= Tony Hawk's Pro Skater 5 =

2015 video game

- North American cover art
- Developers: Robomodo; Disruptive Games; Fun Labs (Note: PlayStation 3 and Xbox 360 versions)
- Publisher: Activision
- Series: Tony Hawk's
- Engine: Unreal Engine 3
- Platforms: PlayStation 3 PlayStation 4 Xbox 360; Xbox One
- Release: PlayStation 4, Xbox One: NA: September 29, 2015; AU: October 1, 2015; EU: October 2, 2015; PlayStation 3, Xbox 360: WW: December 15, 2015
- Genre: Sports
- Modes: Single-player, multiplayer

Tony Hawk's Pro Skater 5 is a 2015 skateboarding video game developed in a collaboration between Robomodo and Disruptive Games, and published by Activision. The tenth main installment in the Tony Hawk's series, the game is the first new title in the main series since 2007's Proving Ground and the first Pro Skater since 2002's Pro Skater 4, as the series had been put on hold following a lack of critical and commercial success with later games.

As the licensing deal between Tony Hawk and Activision was set to expire by the end of 2015, the game was hastily developed within a few months and released unfinished, with most content contained in a large day-one patch. As a result, the game was panned heavily by critics upon release, with criticism centering on its graphics, bugs and glitches, controls, and lack of design, although slight praise fell toward the game's soundtrack. It became Robomodo's final game, as the company went out of business in August 2016.

== Gameplay ==
Like most other games in the series, Tony Hawk's Pro Skater 5 oriented its gameplay to classic arcade games. The goal of most modes of the game is to achieve a high score or collect certain objects. As with previous Pro Skater games, the game does not feature a story. To score, the player has to successfully perform and combine aerials, flips, grinds, lips, and manuals, with successful executions adding to the player's score. The point value of the trick is based on time maintained, degrees rotated, number of tricks performed in sequence, performing tricks on specific landmarks on the map, and the number of times the tricks have been used. Successful tricks also add to the player's special meter, which, once full, allows for the execution of special tricks which are worth considerably more than normal tricks. Bails (falling off the skateboard due to poor landing) attain no points for the attempted trick and reset the special bar to empty. The controls of the game deviate to a degree from previous games in the series, omitting features such as switching grind tricks in the same sequence, flatland tricks, the ability to get off the board, climb, slow time, or drive vehicles. Entirely new controls include the ability to stomp to the ground mid-air to reach certain rails or destroy objects. Also, each level features a unique power-up, such as a double jump, gigantism, or a burning or electric skateboard.

Levels in the game are all new to the series, although most are derivative of popular levels featured in earlier entries, with the exception of The Berrics, based on the real-life skatepark of the same name. Pro Skater 5 features a total of ten levels, albeit only seven were available at launch, with the other three being added with post-release patches. Furthermore, the game features the ability to create custom skate parks, as was the case with most previous entries.

=== Featured pro skaters and characters ===
The game features a total of 10 real life professional skateboarders, along with several guest characters. Returning to the series are Tony Hawk, his son Riley, Chris Cole, Andrew Reynolds, David Gonzalez, and Nyjah Huston, while Aaron "Jaws" Homoki, Lizzie Armanto, Leticia Bufoni, and Ishod Wair make their video game debut. Rapper Lil Wayne serves as the celebrity skater for the entry, while fellow rapper Tyler, the Creator and the Teenage Mutant Ninja Turtles were added with a post-release patch. The game does not feature the option to create an individual skater, however; all skaters available can be modified by exchanging their head, torso, or legs, yet their trick set remains unchangeable. Several of these customizations allow the inclusion of characters from different franchises, albeit they are not recognized as separate characters, such as the eponymous Octodad, King Graham from King's Quest, Ratchet from Ratchet & Clank, Sackboy from Little Big Planet as well as Sweet Tooth from Twisted Metal, the last three being exclusive to PlayStation. Xbox, on the other hand, featured Cuphead and his brother Mugman from Cuphead, and the player character from Sunset Overdrive. Characters marked with "^" are new to the series.

Featured pro skaters		Celebrity guest skaters
Lizzie Armanto^; Letícia Bufoni^; Chris Cole; David Gonzalez; Riley Hawk	Tony Hawk; Aaron "Jaws" Homoki^; Nyjah Huston; Andrew Reynolds; Ishod Wair^	Lil Wayne; Teenage Mutant Ninja Turtles^{a}^{b}; Tyler, the Creator^{a}

==== Notes ====
^a Added with a post-release patch ^b Leonardo, Raphael, Micheangelo, and Donatello are presented as a single character, and can be individually selected via changing his outfit.

== Development ==
In 2008, Robomodo was tasked with producing new Tony Hawk's games after original developer Neversoft went to work on the Guitar Hero series. The company produced two peripheral-supported spin-off games, which were commercial and critical failures, Ride (2009) and Shred (2010), and a remake of the first three games in the series, Pro Skater HD (2012). In November 2014, Hawk confirmed that a Pro Skater console sequel was in the works, the first traditional entry since 2007's Proving Ground. Updated news came from Hawk's appearance at Sony's CES conference in January 2015, where he said that the new game was "much further along than he anticipated" and would be coming to the PlayStation 4 console at some point during that year. To point out its return to the series' roots and heyday, it was named Tony Hawk's Pro Skater 5, the first title to bear that moniker since 2002's Pro Skater 4. According to Hawk, Robomodo consulted with some former Neversoft employees to ensure that the gameplay felt like the original Pro Skater titles.

Because the licensing deal between Activision and Tony Hawk was set to expire by the end of 2015, the game was hastily developed within a few months and released unfinished with little promotion. Contrary to popular belief, the entire game is on the disc and to access any levels beyond the tutorial level the player must press Y/triangle instead of X/A; pressing X/A attempts to connect online to play the level, which fails. After initial footage received negative feedback by fans and commentators alike for its outdated graphics, Robomodo made a departure from the attempted realistic look to a cel-shaded style two months prior to the game's release. Activision marketed this as a conscious stylistic decision unrelated to the feedback and solely owing to allow a consistent frame rate. Additional development was done by Disruptive Games, who assisted in developing the multiplayer mode, while Romanian studio Fun Labs co-developed the ports for PlayStation 3 and Xbox 360, which lacks the Multiplayer features from the current gen ports of the game, only keeping Create-A-Park.

== Reception ==
Reception

Aggregate score
Aggregator	Score
Metacritic	(XONE) 39/100 (PS4) 32/100

Review scores
Publication	Score
Destructoid	5/10
Edge	2/10
Electronic Gaming Monthly	3.5/10
Eurogamer	Avoid
Game Informer	6.5/10
GameRevolution	2/5
GameSpot	3/10
GamesRadar+	1.5/5
Giant Bomb	1/5
IGN	3.5/10
Official Xbox Magazine (US)	1.5/5
Metro	2/10

=== Critical reception ===
Tony Hawk's Pro Skater 5 was released on September 29, 2015, for PlayStation 4 and Xbox One, and on December 15 for PlayStation 3 and Xbox 360. Both eighth-generation versions were panned heavily by critics upon release. On aggregating review website Metacritic, the Xbox One version has a score of 38% based on 18 reviews and the PlayStation 4 version has a score of 32% based on 43 reviews, both indicating "generally unfavorable" reviews. It has the fourth-lowest average score of any PlayStation 4 title and the fifth-lowest average score of any Xbox One title.

Most critics noted that the graphics were inferior even to the games released on the PlayStation 2, while the gameplay barely resembled previous releases and the game was rendered almost unplayable by numerous bugs. Furthermore, the simplistic, bland environments and missions, as well as the complete absence of non-player characters (NPCs) were noted, while some critics pointed out that better levels could have been designed with the Create-a-Park feature of previous games, whereas most levels were simply inferior copies of levels from the original games. Edge even went so far to call Pro Skater 5 "an insult to its history, to its licensed skaters and sponsors, to modern hardware, and to anyone who plays it".

Marty Sliva of IGN awarded it a score of 3.5 out of 10, saying that "Tony Hawk's Pro Skater 5's rare moments of nostalgic joy are drowned out by its abundance of faults". He was critical of the newly adjusted control scheme, especially the new stomp function that was using the same button as grind, thus interfering with combos more often than not. Also, the sheer abundance of bugs and framerate drops rendered the game unplayable, especially online. Furthermore, he found the levels to be inferior copies of levels from previous games, thus "lack[ing] any sort of charm or identity". Lastly, he characterized the challenges in the level as a chore, as they were extremely repetitive, bland, and questioned the decision of making them unskippable even when the objective was completed.

Peter Brown of GameSpot gave the game a 3/10, saying that the game was "riddled with technical glitches and design missteps, making it a huge step back for the series", naming his article "cheap skate". Like Sliva, he criticized the level design, as he deemed the levels to be small, ugly, boring, and lacking clever combo elements found in earlier entries of the series. He too was critical of the new stomping mechanic, while finding the online gameplay to be a hindrance, as it not only slowed down the frame rate, but also required constant connection to a server, which failed more often than not and could only be solved by disconnecting the console from the internet. Unlike Sliva, he noted the soundtrack as a positive aspect of the game.

Jeff Gerstmann of Giant Bomb opened his review of the game with the phrase "Don't play this game". As for the levels, he noted that they "have no character and feel slapped together, like someone was in a hurry", referencing the short development time. He was especially critical of the Rooftop level, stating that it "might be the worst level this franchise has ever produced". He went into detail criticizing the new trick system, especially the changed mechanics of double and triple flips, absence of branching and flatland tricks, and the new special meter, which essentially boiled down to attaining a higher multiplier. All in all, he found the level and controls to lack flow. He also called the game out for its inability to skip tasks once completed and the abundance of different loading screens and loading time when starting an objective. He ultimately gave the game 1 out of 5 stars. Metro GameCentral gave the game a similar score of a 2 out of 10, calling it "a sad, pathetic end to a classic games franchise" and stating that "the lack of ambition – and budget – is painfully obvious at every turn".

=== Legacy ===
It was named the "Worst Video Game of 2015" by Entertainment Weekly. Polygon named Tony Hawk's Pro Skater 5 one of the worst games of 2015, writing that it was "so broken, so garish and so grim that reformed Tony Hawk lovers rue the day they first laid eyes on the franchise. Sometimes, it's better to leave what's past in the past". Similarly, GameSpot included the game in its "Worst Reviewed Games of 2015" list, noting that "within THPS5 lies a basic skating game that's difficult to enjoy, because you have to jump over numerous hoops and ignore a plethora of obvious issues to find the smallest amount of fun". Following the disastrous release of Pro Skater 5, developer Robomodo went out of business eleven months after the game's release, while Hawk's licensing deal with Activision was not renewed. In 2019, the game was named one of the worst video game sequels of the decade by GameRant.

With the release of Tony Hawk's Pro Skater 1 + 2, a remaster of the original Tony Hawk's Pro Skater and its first sequel in 2020, several critics pointed out the stark contrast in quality, with IGN noting it was "difficult to believe that they share even a shred of DNA". Also, reviewers pointed out that the 2013 fan-made Tony Hawk's Underground 2 mod THUG Pro offered a more enjoyable and affordable Pro Skater experience.

== See also ==
- List of video games notable for negative reception
