= Tony Hawk's Pro Skater 3 + 4 =

2025 video game

- Developer: Iron Galaxy
- Publisher: Activision
- Director: Kurt Tillmanns
- Designer: Mike Rossi
- Composer: Logan Byers
- Series: Tony Hawk's
- Engine: Unreal Engine 4
- Platforms: Nintendo Switch; Nintendo Switch 2; PlayStation 4; PlayStation 5; Windows; Xbox One; Xbox Series X/S
- Release: WW: July 11, 2025
- Genre: Sports
- Modes: Single-player, multiplayer

Tony Hawk's Pro Skater 3 + 4 is a 2025 skateboarding video game developed by Iron Galaxy and published by Activision. Similar to Vicarious Visions' Tony Hawk's Pro Skater 1 + 2, it is a remake of Pro Skater 3 (2001) and Pro Skater 4 (2002), which were originally developed by Neversoft.

The game was released for the Nintendo Switch, Nintendo Switch 2, PlayStation 4, PlayStation 5, Windows, Xbox One and Xbox Series X/S on July 11, 2025. It received generally favorable reviews from critics, who praised the game's presentation and gameplay but criticized Pro Skater 4's stripped down career mode and changes to the soundtrack.

== Gameplay ==
Tony Hawk's Pro Skater 3 + 4 is a skateboarding video game played in a third-person view with its gameplay oriented towards classic arcade games. It uses the same mechanics as its predecessor 1 + 2, likewise, it also includes mechanics from all previous games up to Tony Hawk's Underground. The goal of most modes of the game is to achieve a high score or collect certain objects. The player must complete objectives to unlock levels to progress through the game. To score points, the player has to successfully perform and combine aerials, flips, grinds, lips, and manuals, with successful executions adding to the player's score. The point value of the trick is based on time maintained, degrees rotated, number of tricks performed in sequence, performing tricks on specific landmarks on the map, and the number of times the tricks have been used. Successful tricks add to the player's special meter, which, once full, allows for the execution of special tricks which are worth a great deal more than normal tricks. Bails (falling off the skateboard due to poor landing) attain no points for the attempted trick sequence and reset the special bar to empty. The game retains the core mechanics of the original games, including trick-based skateboarding gameplay, score challenges, and level objectives.

The career mode for Tony Hawk's Pro Skater 4, which was open-ended in the original game, has been replaced with a two-minute run wherein the player must complete as many challenges as possible, similar to the first three games in the series. The in-game timer, however, can optionally be extended up to an hour.

The game features visual improvements such as 4K resolution support, enhanced textures, smoother animations, and improved lighting effects. Most original maps from the sixth generation home console versions of Pro Skater 3 and Pro Skater 4 return, (Note: "Oil Rig" from the Xbox version of Pro Skater 3 and "Carnival" and "Chicago" from Pro Skater 4 are excluded.) alongside new maps that were specifically designed for Pro Skater 3 + 4.

Online multiplayer supports cross-platform play for up to eight players. The Create-A-Skater mode allows for expanded customization options, while the Create-A-Park mode includes additional tools for designing custom skate parks.

=== Featured pro skaters and characters ===
The game includes a total of 31 professional skateboarders, the largest roster in series history. As with other games in the series, the game also has several fictional characters. It features both classic and modern skaters, bringing back Tony Hawk, Bucky Lasek, and Rodney Mullen while introducing new pro skateboarders like Rayssa Leal, Margielyn Didal and Yuto Horigome. Additionally, disabled skater Felipe Nunes is featured as a non-playable character. The Deluxe Edition features the Doom Slayer (Note: Digital Deluxe Edition only. Previously included as an unlockable character in the Windows version of Pro Skater 3 as the "Doom Guy".) and a Revenant (Note: Digital Deluxe Edition only) from the Doom franchise as bonus characters, while pre-ordering the game gave access to an exclusive style for Tony Hawk. Additionally, Michelangelo of the Teenage Mutant Ninja Turtles, who were previously featured as bonus characters in Tony Hawk's Pro Skater 5, returns, now based on his depiction from the 2023 film Mutant Mayhem. Returning from Pro Skater 1 + 2, Jack Black provides his likeness and voice as Officer Dick, a playable secret character who was also in the original games, as well as London officer Constable Richard. Skaters that are new to the series are marked with a "^".

Featured pro skaters				Special guest skaters
Andy Anderson^ (Note: Unlockable secret skater); Lizzie Armanto; Leo Baker; Letícia Bufoni; Bob Burnquist; Steve Caballero; Kareem Campbell; Chloe Covell^	Margielyn Didal^; Jamie Foy^; Aurélien Giraud^; Rune Glifberg; Riley Hawk; Tony Hawk; Yuto Horigome^; Nyjah Huston	Tyshawn Jones; Eric Koston; Bucky Lasek; Rayssa Leal^; Bam Margera; Rodney Mullen; Chad Muska; Aori Nishimura	Shane O'Neill; Andrew Reynolds; Geoff Rowley; Elissa Steamer; Jamie Thomas; Nora Vasconcellos^; Zion Wright^	Birdman; Constable Richard / Officer Dick (Jack Black) (Note: Both are presented as a single character and are selected via their outfit.); Doom Slayer; Michelangelo; Revenant

== Development ==
Following the critical and commercial success of Tony Hawk's Pro Skater 1 + 2 by Vicarious Visions in 2020, Activision intended to continue with remakes of the third and fourth installments. However, in April 2022, Vicarious Visions was fully merged into Blizzard Entertainment, becoming Blizzard Albany, and shifted its focus exclusively to Blizzard's projects. After its initial cancellation, development of Tony Hawk's Pro Skater 3 + 4 was restarted in 2024, with Iron Galaxy producing the game.

Initially, Bam Margera, a playable skater in the original games, was going to be cut from the remake; however, after the intervention of Tony Hawk in May 2025, it was announced that he would be included as a secret skater.

== Marketing and release ==
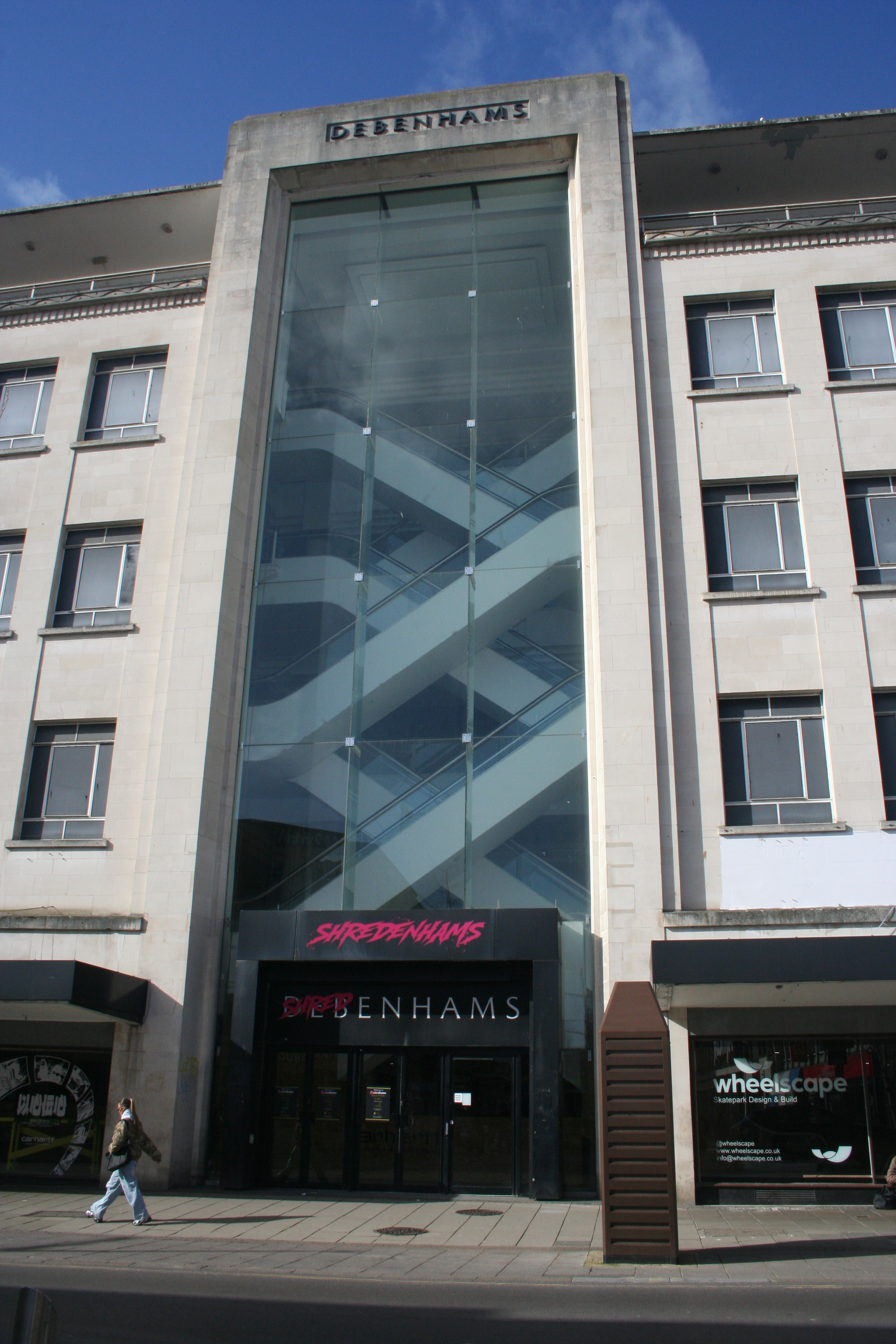
A promotional event for the game was held at the Shredenhams skate park in Bristol, England

Activision teased the reveal of Tony Hawk's Pro Skater 3 + 4 inside Call of Duty: Black Ops 6. During the game, players discovered hidden references and clues about the upcoming Tony Hawk's remake, leading to the setup of a countdown. This teaser strategy culminated in the official reveal on March 4, 2025, scheduled for release on July 11, for Nintendo Switch, PlayStation 4, PlayStation 5, Windows, Xbox One and Xbox Series X/S platforms. A Nintendo Switch 2 version was announced on April 2. In the weeks prior to its release, multiple trailers introducing new skaters were released and a demo called The Foundry Demo which features two levels; Foundry from Pro Skater 3 and College from Pro Skater 4 was made available on June 8. It has been available for Game Pass Ultimate and PC Game Pass subscribers since launch.

Besides the base game, the Digital Deluxe Edition of the game includes the Doom Slayer and a Revenant from Bethesda Softworks' Doom as playable characters as well as bonus songs and customization items. The Collector's Edition includes all bonus items from the Digital Deluxe release and a limited-edition Birdhouse skateboard deck. Pre-ordering the game gave access to additional cosmetics as well as a special version of Tony Hawk as an exclusive skin.

To further increase interest in the game, the soundtrack was released as a Spotify playlist in three waves starting in March, introducing new and old songs. Additionally, players who ordered the Digital Deluxe Edition received a exclusive rendition of "At Doom's Gate" from Doom in-game.

As part of another promotion, Taco Bell announced on June 23, 2025, that it had partnered with Hawk to launch his version of the company's Luxe Cravings Box, exclusively available through its website and mobile app. Each week from the game's release through August 13, Taco Bell plans to offer unique in-game downloadable content (DLC) for each of the company's boxes sold in-app in the form of product placement attire; the promotion also involved a giveaway of 50,000 game demo codes and 500 custom skateboard decks on June 24, with the first 15 of the latter autographed by Hawk. An advertising campaign launched to promote Hawk's box featured Hawk and a group of young skateboarders alongside music from Turnstile with the dual singles "Seein' Stars" and "Birds" from the band's third album Never Enough. In the United Kingdom, a free promotional event for the game was held at "Shredenhams", an abandoned department store-turned skate park in Bristol. The event, which took place on July 12, 2025, featured skate sessions with pro-skaters and a contest in which attendees could collect letters of the word "SKATE" around the park, similar to the game. A UK-based tribute band, The 900, was also a part of the event by performing music featured in the Tony Hawk’s Pro Skater series.

== Reception ==
Reception

Aggregate scores
Aggregator	Score
Metacritic	(NS2) 85/100 (PC) 81/100 (PS5) 82/100 (XSXS) 86/100
OpenCritic	87% recommend

Review scores
Publication	Score
Destructoid	7.5/10
Eurogamer	4/5
Game Informer	8/10
GameSpot	8/10
GamesRadar+	4/5
Hardcore Gamer	4/5
IGN	8/10
Push Square	8/10
Shacknews	9/10
The Guardian	4/5

Tony Hawk's Pro Skater 3 + 4 received "generally favorable" reviews from critics, according to the review aggregation website Metacritic. OpenCritic determined that 87% of critics recommended the game.

Andrej Barovic of Destructoid praised the game for being solid and a fun experience despite criticizing the Pro Skater 4 career mode as "butchered." Christian Donlan from Eurogamer criticized the cuts and alterations, but mostly praised the game for being a properly glorious collection of two classic games. Wesley LeBlanc wrote on Game Informer that "While Iron Galaxy has excellently modernized the gameplay and graphics of these classics to feel right in 2025, I wish it had done a better job of highlighting the influence these games once had in their heyday." GameSpot's Mat Paget raised concerns about the Career mode but still praised the game for continuing the series' superb legacy of skating supremacy. While James Daly for GamesRadar criticized the game for its lack of evolution from the previous entry, he still praised the game for its welcome visual updates to classic maps, and the level creator brings plenty of new challenges and points out that there's a lot more ups than downs.

Zach McKay from Hardcore Gamer criticized the game's downside for its missing significant portion of unlockable characters and iconic tracks from the soundtrack, however he praised the game for keeping the experience that people know and love with its updated visuals and gameplay that keep the skating fresh and special. "Tony Hawk's Pro Skater 3 + 4 proves yet again the series' over-the-top skateboarding formula is totally timeless, even if some of the changes to THPS4 miss the mark and the soundtrack has been fumbled." was Luke Reilly's conclusion on IGN. Stephen Tailby's review on Push Square concluded that "Tony Hawk's Pro Skater 3 + 4 is another fantastic skateboarding title that revives some all-time classics, albeit with some caveats. It's a shame that THPS4 couldn't be more faithfully restored, but what is included still makes for a fun arcade skating experience that fans of the series shouldn't skip — especially considering the brand new levels and other neat secrets. It may not be the greatest remake, but it's further proof that there's life yet in this timeless series." Asif Khan for Shacknews called the game a "faithful recreation of two pivotal entries in the franchise's storied history." Writer for The Guardian, Keza MacDonald says "This remake is a nostalgia fest of grabs, spins, flips and skids – and a stiff, even occasionally humiliating test of skill."

At the Golden Joystick Awards 2025, the game was nominated for Best Remake/Remaster.
