= The Thunderlords =

American heavy metal band

- Origin: Woodland Hills, USA
- Genres: Heavy metal, groove metal, thrash metal, children's music
- Members: Alan Flores; Maya Flores
- Website: www.myspace.com/thethunderlords

The Thunderlords are an American heavy metal band. They describe themselves as "heavy metal for kids."

== Career ==
The band began primarily as the work of video-game programmer Alan Flores, a native of Los Angeles, with some help from his young daughter, Maya (born 2000).

The 2005 album Noisy Songs for Noisy Kids has charted on children's music charts in the US, Australia and Belgium.

They are known best for their songs "I Like Dirt" and "Ice Cream Headache" on the soundtracks for the bestselling video games Tony Hawk's American Wasteland, Tony Hawk's Project 8 and Tony Hawk’s American Sk8land respectively. The latter game also won the IGN award for Best Licensed Soundtrack on PlayStation 3 in 2006.

== Members ==
- Alan Flores - vocals, all instruments
- Maya Flores - vocals

== Discography ==
- Noisy Songs for Noisy Kids (Album, 2005)
