= Razor Freestyle Scooter =

2000 video game

- Developers: Shaba Games (PS); Crawfish Interactive (GBC/GBA); Titanium Studios (DC/N64)
- Publisher: Crave Entertainment: EU: Ubi Soft
- Platforms: PlayStation, Game Boy Color, Dreamcast, Game Boy Advance, Nintendo 64
- Release: PlayStation: NA: December 12, 2000; EU: March 30, 2001; Game Boy Color: NA: June 14, 2001; EU: June 15, 2001; Dreamcast: NA: August 9, 2001; EU: April 26, 2002; Game Boy Advance: NA: November 20, 2001; EU: December 7, 2001; Nintendo 64: NA: November 27, 2001
- Genre: Sports
- Modes: Single-player, multiplayer

Razor Freestyle Scooter, known as Freestyle Scooter in Europe, is a 2000 extreme sports game developed by Shaba Games and published by Crave Entertainment for the PlayStation, Game Boy Color, Dreamcast, Game Boy Advance and Nintendo 64.

== Gameplay ==
Licensed by RazorUSA, a company that makes scooters and safety equipment, Razor Freestyle Scooter has player controlling one of ten characters though a series of three environments while trying to perform various stunts and aerial maneuvers (a total of 45 moves are available in the game). The game was unlicensed outside of North America and released in Europe as Freestyle Scooter.

Built using the Grind Session skateboarding engine, the game follows a group of kids whose friends have been captured by an evil giant robot. Players complete challenges across the main levels to unlock special stages, where they can rescue the captured characters. After each rescue, players return to the main levels with a more difficult set of challenges. The game ends when all special levels are completed and all friends, including Ultimate Fighting Championship fighter Tito Ortiz, have been rescued.

The soundtrack features pop-punk artists such as Ex Number Five, Never Too Late and Sick Shift.

== Reception ==
Reception

Aggregate scores
Aggregator	Score				
Aggregator	Dreamcast	GBA	GBC	N64	PS
GameRankings	66%	57%	44%	60%	70%
Metacritic	66/100	N/A	N/A	N/A	65/100

Review scores
Publication	Score				
Publication	Dreamcast	GBA	GBC	N64	PS
AllGame	N/A	3.5/5	3.5/5	N/A	2.5/5
CNET Gamecenter	N/A	N/A	N/A	N/A	7/10
Electronic Gaming Monthly	N/A	N/A	4.67/10 (Note: Three critics of Electronic Gaming Monthly gave the Game Boy Color version each a score of 3/10, 5/10, and 6/10 in an early review.)	N/A	7/10 (Note: Three critics of Electronic Gaming Monthly gave the PlayStation version each a score of 7.5/10, 7/10, and 6.5/10.)
EP Daily	N/A	N/A	N/A	N/A	7/10
Game Informer	7.5/10	N/A	N/A	N/A	8/10
GameRevolution	N/A	N/A	N/A	N/A	C−
GameSpot	6.3/10	N/A	N/A	N/A	6.6/10
GameSpy	7.5/10	N/A	N/A	N/A	N/A
IGN	6.2/10	N/A	N/A	N/A	4.5/10
Jeuxvideo.com	5/20	N/A	N/A	6/20	7/20
Next Generation	N/A	N/A	N/A	N/A	3/5
Nintendo Power	N/A	2.6/5	3/5	3/5	N/A
Official U.S. PlayStation Magazine	N/A	N/A	N/A	N/A	3/5
X-Play	N/A	N/A	N/A	N/A	4/5
The Cincinnati Enquirer	N/A	N/A	N/A	N/A	3.5/5

The PlayStation and Dreamcast versions received "mixed or average reviews" according to the review aggregation website Metacritic. David Chen of NextGen said that the former was "Far too easy, but it leaves you wondering why the big guys can't come up with new stuff too." Marc Saltzman of The Cincinnati Enquirer described it as a "fun but easy diversion that's geared more towards the younger or casual gamer".

Reviewing the NTSC Dreamcast release, Martin Mathers of Dreamcast Magazine UK likened the title to the Tony Hawk's series of games, giving it a score of 62% and arguing that, "For all the incredibly well borrowed ideas it has, the developers appear to have forgotten to do anything extra on top of them to make the game worth owning."

Iron Thumbs of GamePro's March 2001 issue called the PlayStation version "a great game for Razor enthusiasts who like simple—very simple—gameplay." (Note: GamePro gave the PlayStation version 4/5 for graphics, two 4.5/5 scores for sound and control, and 3.5/5 for fun factor.) Three issues later, however, Bro Buzz's early review said that the Game Boy Color version was "likely aimed at kids who don't own Razors. If you've got one, you'll have more fun ridin', not playin'." (Note: GamePro gave the Game Boy Color version two 2.5/5 scores for graphics and fun factor, and two 3/5 scores for sound and control in an early review.)
