= THUG Pro =

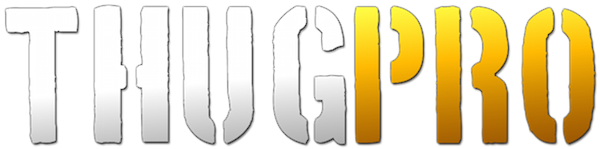
- Designers: Morten; Quazz %.Gone; Chase
- Series: Tony Hawk's Pro Skater
- Platform: Microsoft Windows
- Release: August 10, 2013
- Genre: Sports
- Modes: Single-player, multiplayer

THUG Pro (Tony Hawk's Underground: Pro) is a total conversion mod of the 2004 video game Tony Hawk's Underground 2. It uses its gameplay as the basis for an all-encompassing collection of levels from every original Neversoft game in the series, for use in single-player and online multiplayer gameplay.

The mod has been continuously updated since its initial beta release in 2013 with the most recent update being released in October 2023. The mod is free to download, but Underground 2 must be installed.

== Background and development ==
According to developer Morten Larson in a 2018 interview with Vice, the idea for a mod such as THUG Pro had existed for a long time, but by 2012, felt it had become necessary; the community was struggling and fractured by that point, with the majority of the game's online servers having since been shut down, and those still playing on unofficial servers were spread across different platforms.

The mod's first official beta release was on August 10, 2013. In its initial release, the mod featured all levels from Tony Hawk's Underground and its sequel Underground 2, as well as custom park themes from Pro Skater 4 and American Wasteland. Over the time, more levels from the games were added; for instance, in December 2015, the rest of the Pro Skater 3 levels were added.

THUGPro's original logo from its initial 2013 release

In the same interview with Vice, Larson detailed long-term plans for the future of THUG Pro, including mod support, new levels, a "Create-A-Theme" mode, custom soundtracks, and a higher resolution visual overhaul. These features appeared in update 0.6.0.0, released in late June 2018.

== Gameplay ==
THUG Pro, being a mod of Underground 2, has similar gameplay to that of the sixth generation-era entries in the Tony Hawk game series. The mod focuses on online multiplayer as its main game mode and there is no single-player campaign. Its only single-player mode is "Freeskate"/"High Score Run", which allows players to practice for online play. Online multiplayer consists of all traditional game types found in past Tony Hawk games.

The game includes a majority of the levels from the Neversoft era of the franchise except of Tony Hawk's Proving Ground.

== Features ==
Aside from its inclusion of a majority of levels from throughout the Tony Hawk's series, THUG Pro also includes support of customized levels and soundtracks. Custom levels and skaters made by other users can be downloaded on the THPSX website. A Blender plugin used for importing and exporting custom levels into the THUG2 format (as well as support for models from several other Tony Hawk games) was released in early 2017 by the user "asdf"; it was updated and re-released with expanded support and functionality in 2018 by the user "denetii", which near coincided with update 0.6.0.0's support for importing custom levels. This plugin can be used to export fanmade levels or those imported from elsewhere into Blender to THUG Pro as well as character models that can be rigged to an armature to be used in-game.

== Reception ==
A few months after the mod's initial beta launch, Luke Plunkett of Kotaku was optimistic about the idea of all levels in the series being available for online play. In reviews of the critically panned Tony Hawk's Pro Skater 5 in 2015, reviewers cited THUG Pro as a more enjoyable and affordable Tony Hawk's Pro Skater experience.
