= Tony Hawk's Skate Jam =

- Developer: Maple Media LLC.
- Publisher: Maple Media LLC.
- Series: Tony Hawk's
- Platforms: iOS, Android
- Release: iOS; December 13, 2018; Android; February 1, 2019
- Genre: Sports
- Mode: Single-player

Skate Jam (formerly Tony Hawk's Skate Jam) is a skateboarding video game developed and published by American studio Maple Media. A free-to-play game for iOS and Android mobile phones, Skate Jam is the only game in the Tony Hawk's video game series to not be published by Activision, as their publishing license expired in 2015. Activision later reacquired the license and released Tony Hawk’s Pro Skater 1 + 2 in 2020 and Tony Hawk’s Pro Skater 3 + 4 in 2025.

The game was released for iOS on December 13, 2018 and for Android on February 1, 2019.

== Gameplay ==
Skate Jam is built on the gameplay engine of Skateboard Party, a previous series of mobile games developed by Maple Media and inspired by the Tony Hawk's series. Skate Jam features a traditional Tony Hawk's Pro Skater style career mode with 15 levels, five of which double as competition levels. The levels that make up Skate Jam have all been adapted from previous Skateboard Party titles.

== Development ==
The licensing deal between Hawk and former series publisher Activision expired in December 2015. A year and month later, Hawk said in an interview that he was in early talks to continue the franchise without Activision.

Hawk first teased the game's existence in June 2018, in an interview with The Nine Club, a skateboarding podcast. The game was officially revealed on December 3 as Tony Hawk's Skate Jam. Maple Media, the developers of Skate Jam, have a history developing skateboarding games for mobile platforms, with a flagship series of their own, Skateboard Party, of which Skate Jam is a spiritual successor to.

The game's soundtrack was selected by Hawk himself.

== Reception ==
Reception of the game has been mixed, with many users noting the difficulty and awkwardness of the controls. Mashable noted that "at first glance, Skate Jam appears to be faithful to the original mechanics of THPS, while also adding in some newer elements".

Reception

Review scores
Publication	Score
Pocket Gamer	2.5/5
TouchArcade	2/5
