= Tony Hawk: Vert =

2009 video game

- Developer: Glu Mobile
- Publisher: Glu Mobile
- Series: Tony Hawk's
- Platform: Mobile phone
- Release: 17 November 2009
- Genre: Sports
- Mode: Single-player

Tony Hawk: Vert is a mobile skateboarding video game created by Glu Mobile. It was released on November 17, 2009, the same day when Tony Hawk: Ride was released for consoles. The game features a unique camera perspective and a 3D visual style.

== Gameplay ==
Tony Hawk: Vert is played in a half-pipe and focuses on vert skateboarding. A new point-of-view, unique in the franchise, is used in Vert, with the player viewing their skater from behind one of the ramps of the half-pipe. The game offers three locations and twelve challenges, which include scoring against a clock, "extreme" skater tasks, copy cat challenges, and bonus mini-games (such as trick requests).

== Reception ==
Jon Mundy of Pocket Gamer called the game "a slick, imaginative reboot of an established series" and rated it 3.5 stars out of 5. He went on to say that "bright and full of imaginative touches, Tony Hawk: Vert marks an exciting new direction for the series. It's stopped just short of greatness by its slim running time and a slight lack of depth".
