= Tony Hawk's Downhill Jam =

2006 video game

Tony Hawk’s Downhill Jam
- North American PlayStation 2 box art
- Developers: Vicarious Visions (DS); Visual Impact (GBA); Toys for Bob (Wii) (Note: Ported to PlayStation 2 by SuperVillain Studios.)
- Publisher: Activision
- Series: Tony Hawk's
- Platforms: Nintendo DS; Game Boy Advance; Wii; PlayStation 2; Mobile phone
- Release: October 24, 2006: Nintendo DS; NA: October 24, 2006; AU: November 8, 2006; EU: November 10, 2006 Game Boy Advance; AU: November 1, 2006; NA: November 7, 2006; EU: November 17, 2006 Wii; NA: November 19, 2006; EU: December 8, 2006; AU: December 13, 2006 PlayStation 2; NA: May 8, 2007; EU: June 29, 2007; AU: August 1, 2007 Mobile; NA: 2007
- Genres: Sports, racing
- Modes: Single-player, multiplayer

Tony Hawk's Downhill Jam is a skateboarding video game in the Tony Hawk's series. The game, named after the level "Downhill Jam" from Tony Hawk's Pro Skater, was published by Activision in 2006 as a timed Nintendo exclusive for the Nintendo DS, Game Boy Advance, and Wii (as a launch title). In 2007, it was published for the PlayStation 2. It is a spin-off in which accompanies the release of Tony Hawk's Project 8, which is conversely available on non-Nintendo systems.

As a departure from Neversoft's Tony Hawk games, Downhill Jam emphasizes gaining speed and racing opponents, as well as competing for high scores and completing goals. This is the only racing title in the series.

== Wii version ==
The version of Downhill Jam for Wii was developed by Toys for Bob, developer of Pandemonium! and Disney's Extreme Skate Adventure. This version is played with the Wii Remote held sideways, and players tilt it left or right to steer their character down the track.

As in older Tony Hawk's games, there are game modes for high scores and completing goals, but a high-speed racing mode forms the crux of the game. Tricks are used in part to reach secret and alternate routes, although revert and manual tricks are absent. This formula is similar to that used in the SSX series of snowboarding games.

The Wii version features a multiplayer mode with four players competing head-to-head in split screen. While online play was announced within early development, it was not included in the final version of the game.

=== Downhill Challenge ===
The Wii version of Downhill Jam features a single-player mode called "Downhill Challenge". The story to this is Tony Hawk who puts on an event where Hawk and friends tour around the world to compete in a series of downhill skating competitions such as: Races, Slalom, "Trick", "Steal The Head", and "Elimirace".

=== Story mode ===
In its story, the player recruits skaters into Tony Hawk's skate crew and battles a rival crew run by Antonio Segul (a reference to Tony Hawk, being a bird's name), an "old-school" skater trapped in the 80s. To recruit the skaters, they must beat various challenges before challenging that particular skater to one of 3 events to earn a medal, and the skater themself. The story of the DS version can be treated as a sequel to American Sk8land, as the skatepark featured in Downhill Jam's opening and closing cutscenes is American Sk8land, the decrepit skatepark from American Sk8land. The story mode is only available in the DS version, while the Wii version has "Downhill Challenge".

== DS version ==
The Nintendo DS version was developed by Vicarious Visions, who gained much experience with the Tony Hawk franchise by adapting almost every previous version for GBA as well as Pro Skater 4 for PlayStation and American Sk8land for Nintendo DS.

The Nintendo DS version takes full advantage of the handheld's processing power to utilize 3-D graphics, and is often cited as one of the most exceptional DS games to employ three-dimensional, high-polygon graphics.

The Nintendo DS version has six tracks, each four times larger than a typical level from American Sk8land. The DS version has a similar character set to the Wii version, as well as the ability to create a character and customize his or her appearance, stats, and special tricks.

The Nintendo DS version maintains a traditional Tony Hawk control scheme and much of the same trick set from Sk8land. However, flip tricks can now be held like grab tricks, reverts are eliminated, and the bert slide has been optimized for downhill racing. Additionally a combo buffer has been implemented. When a combo is broken, the player has 3 seconds (a buffer) to start a trick again and save the combo. The player is allowed 20 buffers per combo, making the maximum score of 100 million points per combo still difficult to obtain.

This version supports online multiplayer, but it is no longer available because the Nintendo Wi-Fi Connection servers were shut down in 2014.

== Reception ==
Reception

Aggregate score
Aggregator	Score
Metacritic	(DS) 76/100 (WII) 69/100 (PS2) 59/100

Review scores
Publication	Score
Eurogamer	(DS) 6/10 (WII) 5/10
GameSpot	(DS) 6.6/10 (GBA) 6.8/10 (WII) 6/10 (PS2) 5.9/10
GameSpy	(DS) 4/5 (WII) 4/5
GamesRadar+	(DS) 4/5 (PS2) 3/5
GameZone	(DS) 8.5/10 (WII) 9/10 (PS2) 8.3/10
IGN	(DS) 8.7/10 (GBA) 6/10 (WII) 7/10 (PS2) 5.5/10
Nintendo World Report	(DS) 7.5/10 (WII) 6/10
Pocket Gamer	(DS) 3.5/5
VideoGamer.com	(WII) 5/10

The reception has been mixed. The DS version is the most well-received one among the three, followed by the Wii version and the PlayStation 2 version according to review aggregator Metacritic.
