= Tony Hawk's Motion =

2008 video game

- Developer: Creat Studios
- Publisher: Activision
- Series: Tony Hawk's
- Platform: Nintendo DS
- Release: NA: November 18, 2008; EU: November 21, 2008
- Genre: Sports
- Mode: Single-player

Tony Hawk's Motion is a skateboarding video game in the Tony Hawk's series. The game, developed by Creat Studios and published by Activision, was released exclusively for the Nintendo DS on November 18, 2008.

== Gameplay ==
The game uses a motion-sensing peripheral called the "Motion Pack", which is inserted into the Nintendo DS's Game Boy Advance game slot as the method of control. As well as skateboarding, the game also offers snowboarding.

== Reception ==
Reviews were generally negative towards the game, with some critics complaining about the unresponsive controls from the Motion Pack and the fact that the game was rushed, offering little content. Motion holds an average score of 39 on Metacritic, based on 11 reviews.

Reception

Aggregate score
Aggregator	Score
Metacritic	39/100

Review scores
Publication	Score
Eurogamer	2/10
GamesRadar+	2/5
IGN	4.5/10
Pocket Gamer	1.5/5
