= Tony Hawk's =

Video game series

- Genre: Extreme sports
- Developer: Neversoft (1999–2007); Vicarious Visions (2001–2007, 2020); Robomodo (2009–2015); Iron Galaxy (2023–present) Other: Edge of Reality Natsume Co., Ltd. Treyarch Shaba Games HotGen Gearbox Software Beenox Visual Impact Toys For Bob SuperVillain Studios Page 44 Studios Glu Mobile Creat Studios Buzz Monkey Big Bit Disruptive Games Maple Media
- Publisher: Activision (1999–2015, 2020–present) Other: Jamdat Mobile Glu Mobile Maple Media
- Platforms: PlayStation; PlayStation 2 PlayStation 3 PlayStation 4 PlayStation 5 PlayStation Portable; Nintendo 64; GameCube; Wii; Nintendo Switch; Nintendo Switch 2 Game Boy Color; Game Boy Advance; Nintendo DS; Dreamcast; Xbox; Xbox 360; Xbox One; Xbox Series X/S; Windows; Macintosh; N-Gage; Mobile iOS; Android
- First release: Tony Hawk's Pro Skater; September 29, 1999
- Latest release: Tony Hawk's Pro Skater 3 + 4 July 11, 2025

Tony Hawk's is a series of skateboarding video games published by Activision and endorsed by the American professional skateboarder of the same name. From 1999 to 2007, the series was primarily developed for home consoles by Neversoft with generally annual releases. In 2008, Activision transferred the franchise to Robomodo, which released several entries before Activision and Hawk's license expired in 2015, leaving the future of the series uncertain. In 2020, the series returned under Activision with a remake of the original two games in the series, and a remake of the third and fourth games in 2025 developed by Vicarious Visions and Iron Galaxy respectively.

Starting with Tony Hawk's Pro Skater in 1999, the series was one of the best-selling video game franchises of the early 2000s. Three more Pro Skater games were released from 2000 to 2002, after which the developers took a more story-oriented approach with the releases of Underground, Underground 2, and American Wasteland from 2003 to 2005. Project 8 in 2006 and Proving Ground in 2007 were the final games in the series developed by Neversoft. Developer Robomodo took the franchise in a different direction with the peripheral-supported games Ride and Shred, released in 2009 and 2010 to negative critical reviews and poor sales. Robomodo tried to revive the series with the back-to-the-roots Pro Skater HD in 2012 and Pro Skater 5 in 2015. The series also spawned several spin-offs, such as Downhill Jam in 2006 and Motion in 2008, and several ports and re-releases.

Neversoft's first five Tony Hawk's received critical acclaim for their unique gameplay, varied soundtracks, and expansion over their predecessors. Tony Hawk's Pro Skater 2 and Pro Skater 3 are ranked among the best games released for the PlayStation and PlayStation 2, respectively. Later entries drew less favorable reviews; Ride and Pro Skater 5 were named "Worst Games of the Year" by several outlets. After this, Activision let the licensing deal expire while holding all publishing rights. Fans continued to support the series through an online multiplayer fangame called THUG Pro, which uses Underground 2's engine in an all-encompassing collection of levels from the series.

The first game bearing the Tony Hawk's name not published by Activision, Tony Hawk's Skate Jam, was released in December 2018 for iOS and Android. A second high-definition remake of the first two games, Tony Hawk's Pro Skater 1 + 2, published by Activision and developed by Vicarious Visions (who previously developed ports of several Tony Hawk's games), was released in 2020.

== Games ==
Games in bold indicate main installments.

Year	Title	Developer		
Year	Title	Primary	Additional	
Year	Title	Primary	Handheld	Other
1999	**Pro Skater**	Neversoft (PlayStation)	Natsume Co., Ltd. (GBC); Ideaworks3D (N-Gage, Mobile)	Treyarch (Dreamcast); Edge of Reality (N64)
2000	**Pro Skater 2**	Neversoft (PlayStation)	Vicarious Visions (GBA); Natsume Co., Ltd. (GBC)	LTI Gray Matter (Windows, iOS); Aspyr (Mac/Pocket PC); Treyarch (Dreamcast); Edge of Reality (N64)
2001	**Pro Skater 3**	Neversoft (PS2, GCN, Xbox)	Vicarious Visions (GBA); HotGen (GBC)	Shaba Games (PlayStation); Gearbox Software (Windows); Edge of Reality (N64); Beenox (Mac)
2001	Pro Skater 2x	Treyarch (Xbox)	—N/a	—N/a
2002	**Pro Skater 4**	Neversoft (PS2, GCN, Xbox)	Vicarious Visions (GBA, Mobile); Semi Logic Entertainments (Zodiac)	Vicarious Visions (PlayStation); Beenox (Windows, Mac)
2003	**Underground**	Neversoft (PS2, GCN, Xbox)	Vicarious Visions (GBA); Jamdat (Mobile)	Beenox (Windows)
2004	**Underground 2**	Neversoft (PS2, GCN, Xbox)	Vicarious Visions (GBA); Jamdat (Mobile); Shaba Games (Underground 2: Remix: PSP)	Beenox (Windows)
2005	**American Wasteland**	Neversoft (PS2, GCN, Xbox, X360)	Vicarious Visions (American Sk8land: DS, GBA); Jamdat (Mobile)	Aspyr (Windows)
2006	Downhill Jam	Toys for Bob (Wii)	Vicarious Visions (DS); Visual Impact (GBA); Fishlabs (Mobile)	SuperVillain Studios (PS2)
2006	**Project 8**	Neversoft (X360, PS3)	Page 44 Studios (PSP); InfoSpace (Mobile)	Shaba Games (Xbox, PS2)
2007	**Proving Ground**	Neversoft (X360, PS3)	Vicarious Visions (DS); In-Fusio (Mobile)	Page 44 Studios (Wii, PS2)
2008	Motion	Creat Studios (DS)		
2009	Vert	Glu Mobile (Mobile)		
2009	**Ride**	Robomodo (X360, PS3)	—N/a	Buzz Monkey Software (Wii)
2010	**Shred**	Robomodo (X360, PS3)	—N/a	Buzz Monkey Software (Wii)
2012	Pro Skater HD	Robomodo (X360, PS3, Windows)	—N/a	Disruptive Games (online multiplayer)
2014	Shred Session	Big Bit (iOS, Android; pulled after soft launch)		
2015	**Pro Skater 5**	Robomodo (XONE, PS4)	—N/a	Disruptive Games (online multiplayer); Fun Labs (X360, PS3)
2018	Skate Jam	Maple Media (iOS, Android)		
2020	Pro Skater 1 + 2	Vicarious Visions (Windows, PS4, PS5, XONE, XSX/S)	Turn Me Up Games (Switch)	Beenox (additional work); Iron Galaxy (Steam release)
2025	Pro Skater 3 + 4	Iron Galaxy	—N/a	—N/a

== Gameplay ==
The Tony Hawk's series was originally developed as a classic arcade game. The goal of most modes of the game is to achieve a high score. To do this, the player must perform aerials, flips, grinds, lips, and manuals, with successful combinations adding to the player's score. The point value of the trick is based on time maintained, degrees rotated, number of tricks performed in sequence, performing tricks on specific landmarks on the map, and the number of times the tricks have been used. Successful tricks also add to the player's special meter, which, once full, allows the execution of special tricks that are worth a great deal more than normal tricks. Bails (falling off the skateboard due to poor landing) forfeit points for the attempted trick and reset the special bar to empty. The controls of the game developed as the series progressed. While the original Tony Hawk's Pro Skater featured a fairly limited set of moves, later entries allowed the player to switch between moves during the same grind or manual sequence, perform transfers, hold on to and drive various vehicles, walk on foot and scale walls, slow time, or perform more advanced tricks by pressing buttons repeatedly—for example, a double or triple kickflip instead of a normal one. Later entries, such as American Wasteland, allowed the player to use a BMX, and Motion and Shred featured snowboarding.

The first three Pro Skater games centered around an arcade mode, in which the player tries to achieve a high score, perform certain tasks, and collect a number of objects in a limited amount of time. If the player completes enough of these objectives in one level, they unlock other levels and acquire currency, with which they can improve their character. Competition levels require the player to gain an excellent score with minimal bails to progress. Starting with Pro Skater 2, it became possible to create a custom character and design skateparks. All games until Pro Skater 5 featured local multiplayer, while it was possible to compete in online multiplayer since Tony Hawk's Pro Skater 3. Since the first Pro Skater, it was possible to access all levels without having to perform tasks and without a time limit. This concept was later used in career mode from Pro Skater 4 onwards. Non-player characters give tasks to the player, who could otherwise freely explore the levels without time constraints. Starting with Underground, the series replaced the career mode with a story mode. In Underground, Project 8, and Proving Ground, the story centered around the player character turning into a professional skateboarder. In Underground 2, the only direct sequel in the series, the player embarks on a destruction tour around the world, orchestrated by Tony Hawk and Bam Margera. In American Wasteland, the first of the series to feature one consecutive open world instead of separate levels, the player character aims to rebuild an old skatepark in Los Angeles.

After Activision took the series from Neversoft, the new developer Robomodo changed the general outlet and gameplay of the franchise. Tony Hawk: Ride and its successor, Tony Hawk: Shred introduced a peripheral skateboard which replaced the controller. To provide a realistic skateboarding experience, turning, leaning, hopping, and other actions on the peripheral device were directly translated into the movements of the in-game character via infrared sensors. This resulted in the abandonment of open levels, which were replaced by linear levels that had the character skate on pre-set paths. A similar attempt was made with the Nintendo DS game Tony Hawk's Motion, which used a peripheral device that recognized the leaning of the DS system and had the skater move accordingly.

== Skaters ==
The below table includes all playable professional skateboarders from the main series of games. It does not include playable characters who are either fictional or based on real people who are not professional skateboarders. Unlockable characters in various versions of the game who are not professional skateboarders include Jack Black, Doomguy, Eddie the Head, Jango Fett, Iron Man, Nick Kang from True Crime: Streets of LA, Darth Maul, Judy Nails from Guitar Hero, Shrek, Gene Simmons, Kelly Slater, Spider-Man, Wolverine, a skeleton, a human-sized severed hand and a humanoid with an eyeball for a head based on the Neversoft logo.

Legend
Yes	Playable in this game
a.p.	Playable after patch (skater was added to the game in an update)
Unlockable	Playable, but must be unlocked by the player first
No	Not playable in this game

Pro skater	THPS	THPS2	THPS3	THPS4	THUG	THUG2	THAW	THP8	THPG	THPS5	THPS1+2	THPS3+4
Tony Hawk	Yes	Yes	Yes	Yes	Yes	Yes	Yes	Yes	Yes	Yes	Yes	Yes
Bob Burnquist	Yes	Yes	No	Yes	Yes	Yes	Yes	Yes	Yes	No	Yes	Yes
Kareem Campbell	Yes	Yes	Yes	Yes	Yes	No	No	No	No	No	Yes	Yes
Rune Glifberg	Yes	Yes	Yes	Yes	Yes	No	No	No	No	No	Yes	Yes
Bucky Lasek	Yes	Yes	Yes	Yes	Yes	No	No	No	No	No	Yes	Yes
Chad Muska	Yes	Yes	Yes	Yes	Yes	Yes	No	No	No	No	Yes	Yes
Andrew Reynolds	Yes	Yes	Yes	Yes	Yes	No	Yes	No	Yes	Yes	Yes	Yes
Geoff Rowley	Yes	Yes	Yes	Yes	Yes	No	No	No	No	No	Yes	Yes
Elissa Steamer	Yes	Yes	Yes	Yes	Yes	No	No	No	No	No	Yes	Yes
Jamie Thomas	Yes	Yes	Yes	Yes	Yes	No	No	No	No	No	Yes	Yes
Steve Caballero	No	Yes	Yes	Yes	Yes	No	No	No	No	No	Yes	Yes
Rodney Mullen	No	Yes	Yes	Yes	Yes	Yes	Yes	Yes	Yes	No	Yes	Yes
Eric Koston	No	Yes	Yes	Yes	Yes	Yes	No	No	No	No	Yes	Yes
Bam Margera	No	No	Yes	Yes	Yes	Yes	Yes	Yes	Yes	No	No	Unlockable
Mike Vallely	No	No	No	Unlockable	Yes	Yes	Yes	Yes	Yes	No	No	No
Paul Rodriguez	No	No	No	No	Yes	No	Yes	Yes	No	No	No	No
Arto Saari	No	No	No	No	Yes	No	No	No	Yes	No	No	No
Natas Kaupas	No	No	No	No	No	Unlockable	No	No	No	No	No	No
Ryan Sheckler	No	No	No	No	No	Unlockable	Yes	Yes	Yes	No	No	No
Wee Man	No	No	No	No	No	Unlockable	No	No	No	No	No	No
Tony Alva	No	No	No	No	No	No	Yes	No	No	No	No	No
Jason Ellis	No	No	No	No	No	No	Unlockable	No	No	No	No	No
Daewon Song	No	No	No	No	No	No	Yes	Yes	Yes	No	No	No
Tony Trujillo	No	No	No	No	No	No	Yes	No	No	No	No	No
Stevie Williams	No	No	No	No	No	No	Yes	Yes	Yes	No	No	No
Lyn-z Adams Hawkins	No	No	No	No	No	No	No	Yes	No	No	No	No
Dustin Dollin	No	No	No	No	No	No	No	Yes	Yes	No	No	No
Christian Hosoi	No	No	No	No	No	No	No	Unlockable	No	No	No	No
Nyjah Huston	No	No	No	No	No	No	No	Yes	Yes	Yes	Yes	Yes
Jason Lee	No	No	No	No	No	No	No	Unlockable	No	No	No	No
Kevin Staab	No	No	No	No	No	No	No	Unlockable	No	No	No	No
Bryce Kanights	No	No	No	No	No	No	No	No	Yes	No	No	No
Jeff King	No	No	No	No	No	No	No	No	Yes	No	No	No
Lance Mountain	No	No	No	No	No	No	No	No	Yes	No	No	No
Jereme Rogers	No	No	No	No	No	No	No	No	Yes	No	No	No
Vanessa Torres	No	No	No	No	No	No	No	No	Yes	No	No	No
Lizzie Armanto	No	No	No	No	No	No	No	No	No	a.p.	Yes	Yes
Letícia Bufoni	No	No	No	No	No	No	No	No	No	a.p.	Yes	Yes
Chris Cole	No	No	No	No	No	No	No	No	No	Yes	No	No
David González	No	No	No	No	No	No	No	No	No	Yes	No	No
Riley Hawk	No	No	No	No	No	No	No	No	No	Yes	Yes	Yes
Ishod Wair	No	No	No	No	No	No	No	No	No	a.p.	No	No
Leo Baker	No	No	No	No	No	No	No	No	No	No	Yes	Yes
Tyshawn Jones	No	No	No	No	No	No	No	No	No	No	Yes	Yes
Aori Nishimura	No	No	No	No	No	No	No	No	No	No	Yes	Yes
Shane O'Neill	No	No	No	No	No	No	No	No	No	No	Yes	Yes
Andy Anderson	No	No	No	No	No	No	No	No	No	No	No	Unlockable
Chloe Covell	No	No	No	No	No	No	No	No	No	No	No	Yes
Margielyn Didall	No	No	No	No	No	No	No	No	No	No	No	Yes
Jamie Foy	No	No	No	No	No	No	No	No	No	No	No	Yes
Aurélien Giraud	No	No	No	No	No	No	No	No	No	No	No	Yes
Yuto Horigome	No	No	No	No	No	No	No	No	No	No	No	Yes
Rayssa Leal	No	No	No	No	No	No	No	No	No	No	No	Yes
Nora Vasconcellos	No	No	No	No	No	No	No	No	No	No	No	Yes
Zion Wright	No	No	No	No	No	No	No	No	No	No	No	Yes
Total	10	13	13	15	17	10	13	15	17	9	21	30

== Development ==
=== Background ===
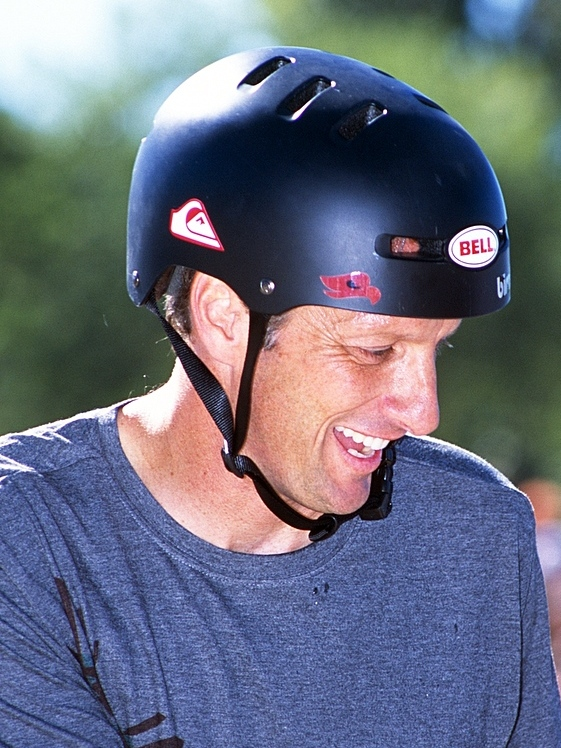
Tony Hawk, the series' namesake, in 2006

To capitalize on the growing popularity of skateboarding as a sport, Activision approached small developer Neversoft to develop a skateboarding game. According to an interview with one of the developers in 2018, Activision originally wanted a skateboard racing game similar to Sega's arcade game Top Skater, but after Neversoft showed them what their engine was capable of, the racing idea was abandoned in favor of a more free-flowing approach. Activision signed professional skateboarder Tony Hawk as the face of the skateboarding game Tony Hawk's Pro Skater. The game had been in development long before Hawk was signed as the face of the brand; as such, his name and likeness were included late in development. Originally, Hawk signed a licensing contract valid until 2002, which was then renewed until 2015, following the success of the Pro Skater series. Mitch Lasky, at that time the senior vice president of Activision, stated in an interview with GameSpot that the game as well as the character were meant "to reflect Tony's signature style – an intense mix of acrobatics and hard-core technical skating". Hawk himself was involved in the development of the game and his in-game persona, remarking that "[he had] always wanted to help create a video game that represented the reality and excitement of professional skateboarding". Hawk, along with other skaters featured in the game, was animated for the game using motion capture and voiced his character.

=== Neversoft era (1999–2007) ===
In early 1998, Activision approached by developer Neversoft to develop a skateboarding racing game, in order to capitalize on the growing popularity of the sport. The idea of a racing game was abandoned in development after Neversoft showed the adaptability of the control engine to various maneuvers. Members of the team were fans of Sega's Top Skater, which they played at a local arcade, and that served as a basic influence on the game's original concept, but Top Skater had a racing element, which the team moved away from as they began studying real-life skaters. To make the gameplay seem as real as possible, company founder Joel Jewett had a halfpipe built in his backyard and started skateboarding with his coworkers. Also, motion capture was used to make the skateboarding moves seem as realistic as possible. To distance the franchise from other games, the developers opted for licensing modern rock songs, in contrast to the classic music usual for video games at that time. The first game was developed within a year by a 12-person team, and Tony Hawk was added as the face of the franchise late in development. A month before the release of Tony Hawk's Pro Skater for PlayStation in 1999, Hawk successfully performed a 900 at that year's X Games, which resulted in huge press coverage of the sport and helped boost sales. Also, the inclusion of the game on the Jampack demo for the PlayStation generated further hype, as players were overwhelmed by the unique gameplay. The huge success of the game prompted Neversoft to vastly expand its production staff in order to be able to release Tony Hawk's games on a yearly basis. Neversoft held true to that ambition and released Pro Skater 2 and Pro Skater 3 in 2000 and 2001, respectively. Both games retained mostly the same gameplay as their predecessor, along with some improvements. The two games were the most critically acclaimed games for their respective consoles and still rank among the highest rated games of all time. Furthermore, Pro Skater 3 was the first PlayStation 2 game to feature online gameplay. Also, Tony Hawk's Pro Skater 2x, a compilation of the first two games, was released as a launch title for the Xbox in 2001. 2002 saw the release of Pro Skater 4; by this time, the franchise was among the best-selling video game franchises in the world. This was reflected in the manpower Activision and Neversoft invested in the franchise, as the employees working on the game had grown from 12 for the first entry to 150 and there were significantly more skaters featured, all of which received considerable royalties.

With the 2003 release of the fifth entry in the series, Underground, the developers used storytelling and exploration to distance their product from the plotless, task-based format of the previous Tony Hawk's games, which led Neversoft president Joel Jewett to describe Underground as an adventure game. It follows the player character and their treacherous friend, Eric Sparrow, on their quest to become professional skateboarders. The game was created with a theme of individuality: it stars an amateur skater in a true story mode, whereas each previous Tony Hawk's game had starred professional skaters and had lacked a plot. One reason for only allowing the player to use a custom character was that certain criminal acts completed in the plot would not reflect well on real-world skaters. Previous games in the series had included character-creation features as well, but Neversoft heavily expanded customization in Underground by implementing face-scanning for the PlayStation 2 version. Regarding the customization options, especially the park editor, producer Stacey Drellishak stated that Neversoft was "trying to create the most customizable game ever". Levels in the console versions of Underground were significantly larger than those of earlier Tony Hawk's games. Neversoft expanded each level until it ceased to run correctly, then shrunk it slightly. Most of the levels were modeled closely after real-world locations; the designers traveled to locales representative of each city in the game and took photographs and videos as reference. Neversoft wanted the player to become familiar with the basic game mechanics quickly and to notice Underground's differences from previous Tony Hawk's games, who all stuck to roughly the same pattern, immediately. To accomplish this, they introduced the player to foot travel and the ability to climb along ledges in the first few missions of the game. While Neversoft wanted to keep Underground realistic and relatable for the most part, they added driving missions as an enjoyable diversion and to push the boundaries of freedom in skateboarding games, but these missions were intended not to take away from the main experience of skateboarding. Because Pro Skater 4 had received criticism for its difficulty, Neversoft added four difficulty settings to Underground's story mode.

Tony Hawk's Underground 2, released a year after its predecessor, was the only direct sequel in the series. While it still featured a story mode, it took a stark departure from Underground and focused on a "World Destruction Tour" orchestrated by Tony Hawk and Bam Margera. As such, the game tried to capitalize on the immense popularity of Jackass and its related media by also focusing on destruction and self-deprecating pranks. One later review referred to the game being "more of a Jackass game than the Jackass game". This was reflected by the Jackass stars Jason "Wee-Man" Acuña, Stephen "Steve-O" Glover, Margera and his father Phil featuring heavily in the game. Due to some fans being displeased with the absence of the goal-oriented approach of the Pro Skater era, a "Classic Mode" showcasing the old gameplay was included from this entry onwards. The PlayStation Portable exclusive Tony Hawk's Underground 2: Remix contained different levels and a slightly different story and was released in the spring of 2005. Former developer Chris Rausch recalled that at the time of Underground and Underground 2, the control scheme of the series had reached its limit and Activision instructed Neversoft to develop each new entry around one single new gimmick, such as a story mode or vehicle controls in the Underground subseries, or the open world of American Wasteland.

In 2005, American Wasteland was released on the PlayStation 2, Xbox, GameCube, Xbox 360 (as a launch title) and later on PC. The game's story mode is set in the city of Los Angeles, where the player character is trying to renovate a run-down skatepark. While the game was advertised with featuring one huge comprehensive open world in story mode, the game's world was actually composed of several levels, resembling different areas of Los Angeles, which were connected through loading tunnels to make them appear consecutive. Similar to Underground 2, the game includes a classic mode separate from the story mode, which mostly recycles levels of the PSP-exclusive Underground 2: Remix, released earlier that year. Furthermore, the game implemented BMX controls similar to the Mat Hoffman's Pro BMX games, which were also released by Activision. Also similar to its predecessor, the game was accompanied by American Sk8land, a handheld game for Nintendo DS and Game Boy Advance consoles with slightly different story and levels.

The promise of an open world skateboarding game was fulfilled with the next entry in the series, Project 8, released in late 2006. While the PS2 and Xbox versions did not feature said open world, the seventh generation of video game consoles, such as the PlayStation 3 and Xbox 360 could support larger content. Once again, the game's story centered on the player character aspiring to become a professional skateboarder, this time by advancing through a rank system to become a part of Tony Hawk's new fictional skateboarding team, the namegiving "Project 8". Unlike in previous entries, the classic mode was embedded in the different areas of the open world. The game did not appear on Nintendo's then-new Wii console, which instead saw the release of the then-exclusive spin-off game Downhill Jam, a downhill racing game featuring a mostly fictitious cast. The game was also released on PS2 half a year later.

The next game in the main series, 2007's Proving Ground featured a largely similar concept to Project 8, with an open world and the player able to choose three career paths as a skater. Baltimore, Philadelphia, and Washington, D.C., were established as the three open world areas, with each containing three skateable areas, which also featured an integrated classic mode. The game was the first and only entry of the series to compete with rival skateboarding series Skate, which also featured an open world but with more advanced controls and a less arcade-style approach. Skate outsold Proving Ground on a 2:1 ratio, resembling its lackluster reception. With the franchise suffering from product fatigue and appearing to be past its prime, Activision decided to dedicate most of Neversoft's laborforce to the Guitar Hero and Call of Duty franchises. This development would more and more marginalize Neversoft, which was defunct and completely merged with Infinity Ward by 2014. The control of the Tony Hawk's franchise had passed on to Chicago studio Robomodo by 2008.

=== Robomodo era (2008–2015) ===
To combat product fatigue and be able to compete with rival EA's Skate series, Activision decided to reboot the series with the new developer Robomodo. Due to this, no new entry in the main series was released in 2008, but the Nintendo DS exclusive spin-off Motion already hinted at the new franchise's new direction, as it featured tilt and motion controls. Furthermore, the game featured the option to snowboard for the first time in the series' history.

In 2009, Robomodo released their first entry in the series, Tony Hawk: Ride, which relied on a peripheral-supported controller shaped like a skateboard. The game did not rely on a plot or an open world any longer and featured a completely different control system, with the player railing down a predetermined route, trying to use the skateboard controller to perform tricks on predetermined obstacles. Activision promoted the game as the next step in the evolution of skateboarding video games, but the game sold poorly and critical reception was negative, with most critics calling the game's $120 price outrageous and the controls non-functioning. GameTrailers named it "Most Disappointing Game of 2009", while GamesRadar named it "Worst Game of the Year". Despite the game's poor reception, a sequel called Shred was released a year later. The game used the same mechanics and concept as its predecessor and reintroduced snowboarding, while aiming at a younger audience. Just like its predecessor, the game was a critical and commercial failure, selling merely 3000 copies in its first week of release in the US. A former developer of Neversoft stated that the idea of a peripheral-supported game came from Activision itself, who were eager to develop peripheral devices for every one of their franchises following the success of Guitar Hero. In a 2012 interview, Hawk defended the idea of peripheral-supported games, stating that the original series had become "diluted" and unable to compete with Skate, which made developing games with the then-popular peripheral devices necessary. Furthermore, he blamed biased critics and rushed development for the commercial failure of the games.

Because all games in the series released since American Wasteland failed to achieve commercial success, Activision decided to put the franchise on hold. When Robomodo was tasked with developing a new game, it was decided to return to the franchise's roots and develop a port of the original Pro Skater series. Tony Hawk's Pro Skater HD was released in the summer of 2012 via download only and featured a collection of popular levels from Pro Skater 1–3. Critical reception towards the game was mixed, as while critics felt that it captured the appeal of the original games, the content was described as sparse, while the game was said to not deliver updated gameplay mechanics and feel dated. In 2014, the endless runner Shred Session soft launched for mobile devices in a handful of territories but was later pulled from the market, postponed indefinitely and later shelved.

After having only produced spin-offs and ports since inheriting the franchise in 2008, Activision announced in mid-2015 a traditional entry in the series developed by Robomodo for PlayStation 3, Xbox 360, PlayStation 4, and Xbox One. To point out its return to the series' roots and heyday, it was named Tony Hawk's Pro Skater 5. According to Hawk, Robomodo consulted with some former Neversoft employees to ensure that the gameplay felt like the original Pro Skater games. Because the licensing deal between Activision and Tony Hawk was set to expire by the end of 2015, the game was hastily developed within a few months and released unfinished with little promotion. After initial footage received negative feedback by fans and commentators alike for its completely outdated graphics, Robomodo made a complete departure from the attempted realistic look to a cel-shaded style two months prior to the game's release. Even though Activision marketed this as a conscious stylistic decision unrelated to the feedback and solely owing to allow a consistent frame rate, the end results did not save the game from being panned by critics upon release in September 2015. Most critics noted that the graphics were inferior even to the games released on the PlayStation 2, while the gameplay barely resembled previous releases and the fact that the game was rendered almost unplayable by numerous bugs. Furthermore, the simplistic, bland environments and missions, as well as the complete absence of NPCs were noted, while some critics pointed out that better levels could have been designed with the Create-a-Park feature of previous games, whereas most levels were simply inferior copies of levels from the original games. The game was so rushed to release that it was unplayable without an 8GB day one patch, with only the tutorial and park creator being accessible. Pro Skater 5 has the fourth-lowest average score of any PlayStation 4 game and the fifth-lowest average score of any Xbox One game and was named the "Worst Video Game of 2015" by Entertainment Weekly. Edge described it as "an insult to its history, to its licensed skaters and sponsors, to modern hardware, and to anyone who plays it". By the end of the year, the license had run out and was not renewed. Robomodo went out of business soon thereafter for unknown reasons.

=== Hiatus and return (2016–present) ===
The initial licensing deal between Hawk and Activision expired in December 2015. In January 2017, Hawk said in an interview that he was in early talks to continue the franchise without Activision and that he was interested in using virtual reality for his next game. That November, Hawk stated that while he would agree to support the future installments under the Pro Skater moniker, Activision owned all rights to the license and thus controlled whether future games would be made. Meanwhile, fans of Neversoft's original series continued to preserve its levels through THUG Pro, an online multiplayer fangame made using Underground 2's engine.

The first game bearing his name and not to be published by Activision, Tony Hawk's Skate Jam, was released for iOS and Android in December 2018.

In 2020, Vicarious Visions remastered the first two Pro Skater games for Microsoft Windows, Nintendo Switch, PlayStation 4, PlayStation 5, Xbox Series X/S and Xbox One as Tony Hawk's Pro Skater 1 + 2. It was released on September 4, once again published by Activision. All levels and skaters from the original games returned in the remaster, and improvements to the skater and park creation tools were added to allow these to be shared online in multiplayer modes. In addition to new songs, the majority of the music from the original games returned as well, with a few exceptions due to licensing issues. Hawk claimed that remasters of Pro Skater 3 and 4 were planned for development following the release of 1 + 2, but these were cancelled due to Vicarious Visions being merged with Blizzard.

On February 18, 2025, skateboarder Tyshawn Jones, who appeared in Tony Hawk's Pro Skater 1 + 2, claimed that new Pro Skater remasters were in development and that he was involved. On February 20, a teaser for an upcoming game was unveiled in a multiplayer map for Call of Duty: Black Ops 6. The teaser, depicting the date 03.04.25, was speculated to be in reference to Tony Hawk's Pro Skater 3 and 4. On February 25, Tony Hawk's Pro Skater 3 + 4 was rated by Singapore ratings board Infocomm Media Development Authority for Nintendo Switch, PlayStation 4, PlayStation 5, Xbox Series X/S and Xbox One. On March 4, Tony Hawk's Pro Skater 3 + 4 was officially confirmed with a reveal trailer and a release date set for July 11, 2025. Also announced was a digital deluxe edition featuring bonus skaters, soundtrack songs, new decks, clothing for create-a-skater and special version of Tony Hawk.

== Reception ==
Aggregate review scores As of August 26, 2025.
Game	GameRankings	Metacritic
Tony Hawk's Pro Skater	(DC) 94% (PS1) 94% (N64) 92% (NGE) 77% (GBC) 63%	(PS1) 92
Tony Hawk's Pro Skater 2	(DC) 95% (PS1) 95% (iOS) 90% (GBA) 90% (N64) 87% (PC) 86% (GBC) 71%	(PS1) 98 (DC) 97 (GBA) 95 (PC) 91 (N64) 84 (iOS) 84
Tony Hawk's Pro Skater 3	(PS2) 93% (GC) 91% (Xbox) 91% (PC) 90% (GBA) 88% (PS1) 81% (N64) 81% (GBC) 63%	(PS2) 97 (Xbox) 93 (GC) 91 (PC) 90 (GBA) 90 (PS1) 87
Tony Hawk's Pro Skater 2x	(Xbox) 83%	(Xbox) 78
Tony Hawk's Pro Skater 4	(PS2) 93% (GC) 89% (Xbox) 89% (PC) 88% (GBA) 88% (PS1) 83%	(PS2) 94 (GC) 91 (Xbox) 90 (PC) 88 (GBA) 85
Tony Hawk's Underground	(PS2) 91% (GBA) 88% (GC) 86% (Xbox) 85%	(PS2) 90 (GC) 89 (GBA) 86 (Xbox) 85
Tony Hawk's Underground 2	(PC) 86% (PS2) 84% (GC) 84% (PSP) 83% (Xbox) 83% (GBA) 70%	(PC) 85 (PS2) 83 (PSP) 83 (Xbox) 83 (GC) 82 (GBA) 70
Tony Hawk's American Wasteland	(NDS) 84% (Xbox) 79% (PS2) 78% (GC) 77% (X360) 75% (PC) 71% (GBA) 69%	(NDS) 84 (Xbox) 77 (PS2) 77 (GC) 76 (X360) 75 (PC) 69 (GBA) 64
Tony Hawk's Downhill Jam	(NDS) 77% (Wii) 69% (GBA) 64% (PS2) 60%	(NDS) 76 (Wii) 69 (PS2) 59
Tony Hawk's Project 8	(X360) 81% (PS3) 77% (PS2) 70% (PSP) 69% (Xbox) 66%	(X360) 81 (PS3) 76 (PS2) 69 (PSP) 68 (Xbox) 67
Tony Hawk's Proving Ground	(NDS) 78% (PS3) 72% (X360) 72% (PS2) 66% (Wii) 58%	(NDS) 79 (PS3) 73 (X360) 72 (PS2) 65 (Wii) 57
Tony Hawk's Motion	(NDS) 41%	(NDS) 39
Tony Hawk: Ride	(X360) 52% (Wii) 51% (PS3) 49%	(Wii) 47 (X360) 46 (PS3) 44
Tony Hawk: Shred	(Wii) 68% (PS3) 67% (X360) 61%	(PS3) 56 (X360) 53
Tony Hawk's Pro Skater HD	(X360) 69% (PS3) 67% (PC) 50%	(PS3) 67 (X360) 66
Tony Hawk's Pro Skater 5	(XONE) 39% (PS4) 33%	(XONE) 39 (PS4) 32
Tony Hawk's Pro Skater 1 + 2	—	(PS5) 90 (XBSX) 89 (PS4) 89 (XONE) 88 (PC) 88 (NS) 85
Tony Hawk's Pro Skater 3 + 4	—	(XBSX) 86 (NS2) 85 (PS5) 82 (PC) 81

=== Critical reception ===
Tony Hawk's Pro Skater was critically acclaimed. IGN gave the N64 version of the game a 9.1 out of 10 praising the gameplay for "genius control, combo system and design" despite little criticism with sound stating "the punk tracks are dumbed down and looped". It also gave the PlayStation version an outstanding rating (9.4 out of 10) again praising the gameplay and the graphics stating it is "simple but amazing in terms of animations, physics, and size of levels". Pro Skater 2 was met with critical acclaim and commercial success, greatly surpassing its predecessor. According to Metacritic, it holds a score of 98/100, making it one of the highest rated video games of all time across all consoles and platforms. Pro Skater 2 along with Soulcalibur, and Grand Theft Auto IV are ranked second behind The Legend of Zelda: Ocarina of Time. Jeff Gerstmann of GameSpot praised the PlayStation version, awarding it 9.9/10, saying "as most major publishers' development efforts shift to any number of next-generation platforms, Tony Hawk 2 will likely stand as one of the last truly fantastic games to be released on the PlayStation". The PlayStation version of the game received a score of 10 out of 10 from the magazine Game Informer, while the rest of the other versions for other consoles received lower scores. In Japan, Famitsu magazine scored the Game Boy Advance version of the game a 33 out of 40 and the PlayStation version of the game a 28 out of 40. In the final issue of PlayStation Official Magazine – UK, the game was chosen as the 7th best game of all time. Game Informer named it the fourth best game ever made in 2001. The staff praised the game for its growth over its predecessor and its impact on its genre. Similarly, the PS2 version of Pro Skater 3 earned a rare perfect 10 score from GameSpot, one of only eleven games to ever receive said score. It was also awarded the best sports game award at E3 2001. IGN rated the game 9.7/10, stating that the game "should go down in history as one of the best twitch-fests on PS2". The game is currently the top rated PS2 game on the review aggregate website Metacritic, with an average score of 97/100, tying with Grand Theft Auto III. Famitsu gave the game a 30/40. As for Pro Skater 4, IGN gave the Xbox version a 9/10, stating that "Tony Hawk 4 is by far the best skateboarding title around and head and shoulders above its 'me-too' competition". The PlayStation 2 version received the highest score from IGN, with a 9.3/10, commenting that though the graphics haven't changed from its predecessor, the maps are much larger than in Pro Skater 3, along with praising the increased difficulty.

Underground was released to critical acclaim: with scores for the PlayStation 2 at 90/100 on Metacritic. GameZone's Michael Knutson stated that Underground is "one of the best skating games around" and that players of every skill level would enjoy it. Eurogamer's Tom Bramwell concurred that "as a 'pick-up-and-play' sort of game, THUG is endlessly rewarding" and called it the best entry in series. The story was especially well received. Joe Rybicki of Official U.S. PlayStation Magazine said that the title, as an extreme-sports game, has a real story with "honest-to-goodness characters". IGN's Douglas Perry called it "a kick, albeit relatively lightweight in nature". He especially praised the pervasive sense of humor in the narrative and in the portrayal of real-world skaters. Knutson called the story "unique" and said that it blends well with the gameplay. The alternate gameplay modes were received very well. Knutson lauded the game's high degree of customization; he summarized that "everything is expounded a hundred fold: from create-a-skater to create-a-park mode, it is simply amazing". He singled out the level editor as one of the deepest he had ever seen. GameSpy's Bryn Williams identified the level editor as an "extremely well-designed" feature that contributed to the overall "brilliance" of the full product. Leeper said that each customization mode is "intuitive and user-friendly", and both he and Rybicki especially enjoyed the trick-creation feature. Reviewers for Famitsu magazine praised the story mode, whose open world format they compared to the Grand Theft Auto series. Knutson and Perry enjoyed the multiplayer, particularly the online Firefight mode. Williams thought similarly and stated that "the most notable disappointment" of the game was the lack of online play for non-PlayStation 2 owners. Harris found the board customization of the Game Boy Advance version to be poorly implemented, though in-depth. Despite his praise for the customization modes, Leeper admitted that his greatest enjoyment still came from "seeking out great lines and beating my scores". While it still got fairly high reviews, critics criticized the story of Underground 2 and some critics noted that the gameplay had not been significantly upgraded from Underground. Silverman and Perry were unimpressed with the short selection of moves introduced in Underground 2. GameSpot agreed, but concluded that "while not all of these changes are all that great, the core gameplay in THUG2 is still very strong". In contrast, Bramwell felt that the Sticker Slap and additional flip and grab tricks were meaningful, enjoyable additions. The addition of Classic mode, was praised by 1UP.com, who considered it superior to the Story mode in terms of levels, while adding that "gamers weaned on PS1 Hawks will shed a tear, while newer fans will get a lesson on how things started". American Wasteland's reception was largely similar to that of Underground 2, with the exception that most critics were fond of the game's story. Chris Roper of IGN praised Neversoft's decision to "go back to its roots and make a game about skating" as opposed to "the chaos and destruction of the Underground games". Jeff Gerstmann of GameSpot stated that the saving grace of the game is a story mode that follows a 'ragtag group of misfits' who struggle to save the place they call home from evil real estate moguls' plot, and that "along the way, the characters become a little endearing". Reviews for Neversoft's entries started to dip with the release of Project 8. In the GameSpot review of the PlayStation 3 version, Project 8 was criticized for its lack of online play on Sony systems and unstable frame rate, with critics noting that the series was becoming more and more stale. Proving Ground was met with mixed to positive reviews upon release. On Metacritic, both the PlayStation 3 and Xbox 360 versions had an average score of 73/100 and 72/100, the PlayStation 2 version had an average score of 65/100, and the Wii version had an average score of 57/100. All of these scores are considered "mixed or average" by the site. The PlayStation 2 and Nintendo Wii versions were criticized for not having the same mechanics that are in the PlayStation 3 and Xbox 360 versions. The Nintendo DS version received generally favorable reviews from critics. On Metacritic it received an average score of 79/100 based on 21 reviews.

As Robomodo began producing Tony Hawk's games, the reviews immediately dropped deep into negative. Tony Hawk: Ride received negative reviews from critics. The Metacritic average score of 47/100, 46/100, and 44/100 for the PlayStation 3, Wii, and Xbox 360 versions respectively indicates "generally unfavorable reviews". GameTrailers gave Tony Hawk: Ride a score 4.6 and named it Most Disappointing Game of 2009, while IGN gave the game a 5.0. Both G4TV and Giant Bomb rated it 1/5. GameSpot gave it a 3.5/10, with the only positive emblem the game received being that the peripheral was "sturdy". GamesRadar gave the game 4/10. They also named it the worst game of the year, using its skateboard peripheral as the trophy for the "Anti-Awards" feature. Game Informer gave it a 5.75, remarking that "as a skateboarder and as a gamer, Tony Hawk: Ride is a curious idea but a letdown in practice. The huge level of frustration is not worth the time it takes to master the awkward gameplay idiosyncrasies". Unlike its predecessors, Pro Skater HD was able to at least attain mixed reviews. IGN's Nic Vargas gave the game a score of 8/10, praising its purist gameplay whilst lamenting the lack of certain modes such as park creator and split screen multiplayer. The reviewer from GameTrailers gave the game a score of 7.4 and wrote that Pro Skater HD "isn't flawless, but... it at least gets off on the right foot". Lucas Sullivan of GamesRadar felt that old-school fans of the franchise will be disappointed by what the game lacks, and gamers who never player the original games on PS1 will find the mechanics and level design sparse. Destructoid gave the game 4.5/10, stating that the execution isn't handled as well as the original games, as well as some of the design choices the developer made. G4TV gave the game a 4.5/5 and praised the console versions' online multiplayer and soundtrack. Official Xbox Magazine gave Pro Skater HD an 8/10. They praised the game's new big head mode. Pro Skater 5 reverted to catastrophic reviews again and was bashed by critics upon release in September 2015. Most critics noted that the graphics were inferior even to the games released on the PlayStation 2, while the gameplay barely resembled previous releases and was rendered almost unplayable by numerous bugs. Furthermore, the simplistic, bland environments and missions and complete absence of NPCs were noted, and some critics pointed out that better levels could have been designed with the Create-a-Park feature of previous games, while most levels were simply inferior copies of levels from the original games. The game was so rushed to release that it was unplayable without an 8GB day one patch, with only the tutorial and park creator being accessible. Pro Skater 5 has the fourth-lowest average score of any PlayStation 4 game and the fifth-lowest average score of any Xbox One game and was named the "Worst Video Game of 2015" by Entertainment Weekly. Edge even went so far to call Pro Skater 5 "an insult to its history, to its licensed skaters and sponsors, to modern hardware, and to anyone who plays it".

=== Commercial reception ===
The PlayStation version of Tony Hawk's Pro Skater received a "Platinum" sales award from the Entertainment and Leisure Software Publishers Association (ELSPA), indicating sales of at least 300,000 copies in the United Kingdom. In the United States, Tony Hawk's Pro Skater 2's computer version sold 320,000 copies and earned $8.0 million by August 2006, after its release in October 2000. It was the country's 58th best-selling computer game between January 2000 and August 2006. Combined sales of all Pro Skater computer games released between January 2000 and August 2006 had reached 440,000 units in the United States by the latter date. Also in the United States, the game's Game Boy Advance version sold 680,000 copies and earned $24 million by August 2006. During the period between January 2000 and August 2006, it was the 38th highest-selling game launched for the Game Boy Advance, Nintendo DS or PlayStation Portable in that country. The game's PlayStation version received a "Platinum" sales award from the ELSPA. By July 2006, the PlayStation 2 version of Tony Hawk's Pro Skater 3 had sold 2.1 million copies and earned $77 million in the United States. Next Generation ranked it as the 14th highest-selling game launched for the PlayStation 2, Xbox or GameCube between January 2000 and July 2006 in that country. Combined sales of Tony Hawk console games released in the 2000s reached 10.7 million units in the United States by July 2006. Its PlayStation 2 version also received a "Platinum" sales award from the ELSPA.

In Europe, the PlayStation 2, Xbox, and GameCube versions of Underground were respectively the fifth, sixth, and eighth-best selling games for those consoles the week after the game's release. It would remain uninterrupted in the top twenty of every week until January 24, 2004, for the Xbox and GameCube and February 21 for the PlayStation 2, inclusive. As of December 2007, the PlayStation 2 edition of the game had sold 2.11 million copies in the United States. The GameCube version made Nintendo's Player's Choice list by selling 250,000 copies in the United States. Its PlayStation 2 version also received a "Platinum" sales award from the ELSPA. Skate outsold Proving Ground on a 2:1 ratio, resembling its lackluster reception.

In the first month of its U.S. release, Tony Hawk: Ride sold 114,000 copies. During its first week on sale in the United States, Tony Hawk: Shred sold 3,000 copies. Due to this, former developer Chris Rausch described Shred as the game that had killed the series and he expected no new game for release in the foreseeable future.

Tony Hawk's Pro Skater 1 + 2 became the fastest selling game in the franchise according to Activision, selling 1 million copies within the first two weeks. In the United Kingdom the game was the biggest launch in the franchise since Underground.

The brand brought in about $715 million in revenue by 2004.

== Legacy and fandom ==
During a period of series inactivity caused by the lapse of Activision's contract with Hawk, the Tony Hawk's fanbase largely sustained itself through THUG Pro, a fan-made total conversion mod of Tony Hawk's Underground 2 for Microsoft Windows and macOS that features levels of every game in the series for use in online multiplayer.

A documentary about the Pro Skater series was developed by former Neversoft employee and producer of the series, Ralph D'Amato. The documentary, Pretending I'm a Superman: The Tony Hawk Video Game Story, features interviews from former Neversoft employees as well as skaters featured throughout the series, including Hawk himself and is directed by Ludvig Gür. The documentary came about after D'Amato had taken Gür, who was visiting him in California in 2016, to meet Hawk briefly but which turned out to be several hours discussing the possibility of documentary, which was further developed after more online calls and emails. The documentary's name is based on the song "Superman" by the band Goldfinger which was featured on the first game's soundtrack. The film was released on August 18, 2020.
