= Tony Hawk's Shred Session =

2014 video game

- Developer: Big Bit
- Publisher: Activision
- Series: Tony Hawk's
- Platforms: iOS, Android
- Release: Cancelled; May 22, 2014 (soft launch)
- Genres: Endless runner, sports
- Mode: Single-player

Tony Hawk's Shred Session is a cancelled endless runner sports video game developed by Big Bit and published by Activision. A free-to-play game for iOS and Android mobile phones, it was to be the first game in the Tony Hawk's franchise created specifically for the platform.

Although the game had soft launched in a handful of territories in mid-2014 ahead of a worldwide release, in November 2014 Hawk revealed that the game was postponed indefinitely and the game was later pulled from these territories.

== Gameplay ==
Shred Session would be played as a 3D endless runner, similar to the Temple Run or Sonic Dash video games. The game would include a swipe-controlled trick system, and several game modes.

== Development ==
In October 2013, Hawk discussed the desire to develop games that were intended for a mobile device platform. Four months later, a new entry in the video game series was confirmed. Hawk said that the new entry to the series would be a mobile exclusive, but later confirmed that the game had been postponed indefinitely.
