= Geoff Rowley =

British skateboarder (born 1976)

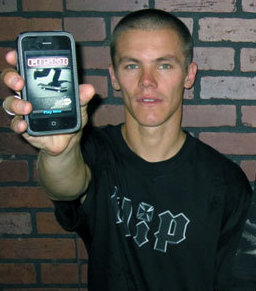
- Rowley in 2010

Personal information
- Full name: Geoffrey Joseph Rowley Jr.
- Born: 6 June 1976 (age 50) Liverpool, England
- Occupation: Skateboarder
- Years active: 1989–present

Sport
- Country: United Kingdom
- Sport: Skateboarding
- Turned pro: 2000

Geoffrey Joseph Rowley Jr. (born 6 June 1976) is an English professional skateboarder, former co-owner of Flip Skateboards and owner of the Civilware Service Corporation. He received Thrasher Magazine's "Skater of the Year" award in 2000.

== Early life ==
Rowley started skateboarding around 1989 in his home city of Liverpool. He would skate for the course of entire days, while his friends would only skate for relatively short periods. In an interview for the UK magazine Rad, Rowley stated that he first became interested in skateboarding because "A lot of people in my school were into skating and I became interested through them." In the same interview, Rowley explained that his parents were both supportive of his skating, although his father was "not into me sitting around the house all day." At the time of the interview, Rowley was sponsored by Gullwing, Siesta, Airwalk, and Jeremy.

In a 2013 interview, Rowley provided further insight into his adolescence, explaining that skateboarding culture was not accepted during his time in Liverpool and it was during the 1980s that the culture became prominent in the city. However, even following the rise in prominence, skateboarding products were difficult to purchase:

The only place that actually sold skateboards in Liverpool at that time was a record shop. It was called Probe Records. When I went in there for the first time they had two boards on the wall, a Skull Skates "Dead Guys" and a Toxic team model. I think they had two sets of wheels and two sets of trucks. They had no griptape and one set of bolts. That was my first memory of going into a skateshop [laughs]. I rode my first complete with no griptape for a month or so until Probe got some grip back in stock.

== Career ==
=== Flip ===
Rowley's first sponsor was Deathbox Skateboards, a company that was later renamed "Flip Skateboards"—at this time, Rowley was also riding for Gullwing. In a "Check Out" segment for the Transworld Skateboarding magazine, Deathbox founder, Jeremy Fox, wrote:

Technical, burly, stylish, quiet, punker, street urchin: these are the descriptions that neatly fit young Geoff Rowley ... He doesn't care about music or anything outside of skateboarding. Although Geoff is from Liverpool (home of the Beatles, by the way) and looks like a rough kid, he is actually one of the least attitude-infested skaters out there today. Geoff is starting to send out 'waves' across Europe, and when Deathbox ships him over to the US, these waves will certainly come over with him.

In 1994, Rowley moved to Huntington Beach, California, United States with fellow Flip team riders, Tom Penny, Rune Glifberg and Andy Scott. In 2012, Rowley reflected upon the company's move to the US:

We were a totally new company moving to a foreign country, and, ah, I don't we kind of expected it to go "boom", and just fly right in. We had no expectations; we didn't really know that many people, and we actually just wanted to skate, really. Because we grew up dreaming of living in California and getting to wake up every day and go out and skate without it raining. Ah, and I think that was something that, like, all of the guys, when we first moved here, you know, Rune [Glifberg] and Tom [Penny], that was something that, you couldn't hold us back in that respect. I'd just turned eighteen, Tom was seventeen, ah, neither of us had lived away from home, you know. We'd moved to a foreign country where we didn't know anybody. Nobody. Ah, we had no money, we didn't have any cars, ah, alls we had was the board that we had; we couldn't go breaking those. we couldn't afford to, at the time, starting a company, we couldn't afford to run through ten boards a month ... Like myself, personally, I skated a lot with Ed [Templeton], like, every day, because he lived, like, right across the road from me.

After two weeks in California, Rowley was featured on the cover of TransWorld Skateboard magazine—he subsequently decided to relocate to the American state. In regards to his first TransWorld cover, Rowley explained in 2012:

I'd been in the States for, like, two weeks, and I was at TransWorld—we'd been to visit TransWorld for the first time. And Swift just wanted to go shoot—he needed to shoot a Gullwing [truck company]. He said, "You ride for Gullwing, right?" I'm like, "Yeah, I think so ... I got free trucks through the distributor in Britain ... I mean, do I ride for them? I don't, I don't know." "Do you wanna go skate?" And I went skating with them, and then they put it on the cover of the mag. It didn't make any sense to me ... like, at all. It still doesn't make any sense to me; I just went skating with them and then it's on the cover of the mag. I remember gettin' it and thinking, "What just happened? What? That's weird."

Rowley later explained the full extent of Templeton's influence during his early years in the US and stated, "I'll be forever in debt to him" due to Templeton's openness towards Rowley, as the two discovered that they shared the same interests. Rowley explained: "I got on really well with him straight away. As soon as we started talking it was really obvious we'd be good friends. We were into similar music and were from a similar generation."

In an August 2013 interview for Tony Hawk's RIDE YouTube channel, Rowley revealed that he was arrested during the filming for the 2009 Flip video Extremely Sorry. At the time of the incident, Rowley successfully executed a trick between two rooftops while accompanied by a friend and the owners of the property chose to press charges. Rowley spent around nine hours in jail and paid approximately US$20,000 bail for his friend's release—although the video footage of the rooftop trick was confiscated by the police, the trick remains a part of the video that was publicly released (Rowley did not explain how Flip managed to retain the footage for the final edit in either the RIDE channel interview or any other interviews).

Rowley was revealed as an announcer for the Street League Skateboarding (SLS) Super Crown World Championship event on 22 August 2013. The championship event was held in New Jersey, US on 25 August 2013 and featured the competitors who had qualified during the 2013 SLS season. Rowley received an invitation to compete in the series when it was launched in 2010, but he eventually declined the offer due to a competing offer by the Maloof Company responsible for the Maloof Money Cup events—Nyjah Huston replaced Rowley's position. In his pre-championship interview, Rowley predicted that Paul Rodriguez, Chris Cole, Huston, or Luan Oliveira would emerge from the event victorious.

In October 2015 Geoff Rowley left Flip.

=== Vans ===
Rowley has produced a signature line of shoes with Vans footwear since 1999, the year when his first vulcanised shoe model was produced. Rowley is credited with re-introducing the vulcanised skate shoe, whereby a new generation of skate shoes were designed with the benefits and functional superiority of the vulcanised process. In 1999, Rowley performed a "fifty-fifty" grind on the Staples Center's "hubba" ledge, in Los Angeles, US, for his first Vans advertisement; the photographic image led to a significant level of recognition due to the vulcanised shoes that he is wearing in the photograph – at that time, the predominant trend in skate shoe construction consisted of large, bulky designs. The Vans website has written of the innovation:

At the time when Geoff hit Staples no one was skating low-cut, thin vulc shoes. No one had felt their board in nearly half a decade. Shoes at the time were so disgusting and bulky we try not to think about them. But when Geoff shot that ad, doing the gnarliest trick on the biggest hubba, showing people it wasn't about creating a bulletproof space shoe for the year 3000 that would last for six months but rather the priority is and always should be about board-feel everyone took a long, hard look at their feet and wondered, 'What the f@#k are we wearing?' History was rewritten that day, by this man.

As of 2012, Rowley was working on a video project for Vans and he explained in an August 2013 interview that the video will represent a team of grateful Vans riders returning the support provided by the shoe brand thus far. In November 2013, an updated version of Rowley's signature shoe model, called the "Rowley Pro Lite", was released along with a video advertisement containing the tagline "The Original ... Only Lighter" – a reference to the original model that was released in 1999.

=== Trick invention ===
A skateboard trick is named after Rowley: the "Rowley-Darkslide". It is a variation of a darkslide in which the trailing foot is placed on the inside of the truck for the duration of the slide.

=== Sponsors ===
As of 2021, Rowley rides for his own Free Dome Skateboards company, Lost Art Skateshop and is sponsored by Vans, Independent, and Mob Grip.

=== Toy Machine ===
Rowley was announced as joining the Toy Machine Team via Toy Machine's Instagram on May 27, 2024.

=== Management ===
Alongside sponsored skateboarders, David González, Louis Lopez, Arto Saari, Curren Caples and Erik Ellington, Rowley is a client of management company RPRT. RPRT was founded by Matt Meyerson, is managed by Ken Perkins, and is described as "a hybrid agency whose core competencies include film/tv production, talent/athlete management, event production (they currently produce Expose NY, a twice yearly fashion showcase during NY Fashion Week geared towards the media and stylists) and brand consulting."

== Skateboarding influences ==
Rowley's early influences were professional skateboarders, Natas Kaupas, Kris Markovich and Danny Way. In regards to Way, Rowley has explained:

Danny was the first guy that I saw in videos that was really small, really short, and he was doing alley-oop twists, on vert, over channels—and he was thirteen years-old. You know? And I was around the same age, and I saw that and I went, "Wow, you can do that! I wanna do that." I don't know. So Danny's been an influence that far back for me, and, still now, he's incredible.

Despite maintaining pride in his British roots, Rowley has identified the US as the home of skateboarding, explaining in 2012, "... it's the area where it was born, you know? Everywhere needs a heart and this is the heart of skateboarding." In terms of inspiration, Rowley has identified his friends and skateboard videos, both old and new.

In a 2013 interview, Rowley spoke further about the influence of Kaupas, specifically in relation to the "pushing of creative boundaries". Rowley then made a connection with progression in skateboarding, elaborating further on creativity:

He [Kaupas] was doing what he thought was weird. He was pushing his creative boundaries. I think people get so stuck in the way to be ... Street skating to me is different every single day you go out. I'll intentionally go out and skate the same obstacle the opposite way I did the day before ... I think there was a trend in skateboarding for a little while to master the tricks forwards, backwards and every which way: catch them all high, catch them all the same. When you do that, you homogenise form. That gets a little too controlling and creatively confining long term for me, and I think a lot of people feel the same way.

== Influence ==
In December 2011, Transworld Skateboarding named Rowley as the twenty-sixth most influential skateboarder of all time. Following the release of the list, Rowley stated:

I think my generation—myself, Jamie [Thomas], [Andrew] Reynolds—we're the first street guys to ride these real big obstacles on a daily basis. It wasn't like we do it once for a video. I think we all group up skating like that. I think that's what sets us apart I suppose. The willingness to fuckin' try anything every day.

== Awards ==
In the year 2000, Rowley was awarded the Thrasher Magazine's coveted "Skater of the Year" award. In response to Rowley's receipt of the award, teammate and close friend, Rune Glifberg, stated: "Geoff and Arto [Saari] are just some of the gnarliest skateboarders that I have ever witnessed. Geoff is just like, he's like, "I'm gonna do this and fuck it if I kill myself; I am just gonna do it. I don't care." Saari stated, "He's a madman, he's a right madman ... he basically tells everyone to fucking shut the fuck up and then rolls back and comes full blast towards you, and then he fucking pulls it, somehow, it's like ...". In Rowley's post-award interview, he is shown holding a poster that reads: "Get Busy Livin' Or get Busy Dyin'".

== Video games ==
Rowley has been a featured skateboarder in the Vans Skate & Slam mobile game. He has appeared in several games in the Tony Hawk video game franchise. He appeared in Tony Hawk's Pro Skater in 1999 and the next several games throughout 2003's Tony Hawk's Underground. He also appeared in Tony Hawk: Shred and as a downloadable skater for Tony Hawk's Pro Skater HD. He returned to the series in 2020 for Tony Hawk's Pro Skater 1 + 2.

== Company owner and entrepreneur ==
In addition to his co-ownership of the Flip skateboard company, Rowley launched a new business venture in mid-2013 called "Civilware Service Corporation". Rowley explained that the brand is "just a creative outlet for me, for stuff that I'm interested in ... We are making coffee, axes and variety of other oddities to begin with. Hopefully guns at some point, then it would get really fun [laughs]."

As of November 2013, the Civilware website features products such as the "Civilware Pathfinder Axe", apparel, a service tin (with coffee beans) and coffee beans. The philosophy of the brand is published as: "When you ask for a person's attention – their time, their money – you need to return that gesture with an unparalleled level of commitment."

In 2019, Rowley launched his own skateboard company, Free Dome Skateboards.

== Personal life ==
Rowley is a father and resides in Long Beach, California, US. In 2013, Rowley identified his five favourite locations in Long Beach: Cherry Park, Hamilton Skatepark, LB Skate store, Viento y Agua eatery and Vans Corporate Headquarters (in nearby Cypress).

Rowley continues to follow football from the English Premier League and is a supporter of Liverpool F.C. Rowley used the club's anthem "You'll Never Walk Alone" as the music for his part in the Really Sorry skateboard video and stated that his family was pleased: "My whole family loved that ... That's why the song was used—for my parents and my grandparents. It was nod, a thank you in their direction." He shares a birthday with fellow pro skateboarder Andrew Reynolds.

== Videography ==
- Flip: The Long Overdue (unofficial) (1992)
- Hook-Ups: Asian Goddess (1994)
- 411VM: Issue 13 (1995)
- 411VM: Issue 10 (1995)
- Rollersnakes: 720
- Transworld: Uno (1996)
- Church of Skatan: Santa Barbara (1996)
- Airwalk: Skateboarding Video 96 (1996)
- Volcom: Freedom Wig (1997)
- 411VM: Issue 30 (1998)
- Transworld: Feedback (1999)
- CKY2K (2000)
- 411VM: Best Of 411 – Volume 5 (2000)
- Digital – No. 2 (2000)
- Collage (2001)
- CKY 3 (2001)
- OP King of Skate (2002)
- Flip: Sorry (2002)
- Thrasher: S.O.T.Y. Video (2003)
- Flip: Really Sorry (2003)
- CKY4: The Latest & Greatest (2003)
- Volcom: Chichagof (2004)
- Thrasher: King of the Road 2005 (2005)
- Vans: Pleased to Meet You Tour (2005)
- Globe: The Global Assault (2006)
- Flip: Feast Tours (2006)
- Strange Notes: Tastes Like Awesome! (2007)
- Independent: 30th Anniversary Tour (2008)
- Flip: Extremely Sorry (2009)
- Meatpauls! (2010)
- Flip: The Weight of the World (2012)

Rowley has co-directed all of the Flip videos, together with Fred Mortagne and Jeremy Fox (Sorry), Jeremy Fox (Really Sorry), and Jeremy Fox and Ian Deacon (Extremely Sorry).
