= Tony Hawk's Pro Skater 2x =

2001 video game

- Developers: Neversoft; Treyarch
- Publisher: Activision O2
- Series: Tony Hawk's
- Platform: Xbox
- Release: NA: November 15, 2001
- Genre: Sports
- Modes: Single-player, multiplayer

Tony Hawk's Pro Skater 2x is a 2001 skateboarding video game in the Tony Hawk's series. Developed in a collaboration between Neversoft and Treyarch, and published by Activision under the Activision O2 label, Pro Skater 2x is a re-release featuring the 19 levels from Tony Hawk's Pro Skater and Pro Skater 2, as well as five original levels. Some elements from the then-recently released Pro Skater 3 were included, along with other new features. It was released in North America for Xbox on November 15, 2001 as a launch title for the system.

== Gameplay ==
Tony Hawk's Pro Skater 2x is a skateboarding video game with an arcade-style emphasis with regard to realism. The objective is to score points by successfully completing various tricks such as grinds, flip tricks, and aerials. Performing several moves in succession without any pause results in a combo. The player's score is multiplied by the number of tricks in the combo. If the player successfully lands the final trick the score is then banked, otherwise all points in that combo are lost.

Three "Career" modes are included in the game: both full career modes from Pro Skater and Pro Skater 2, and a shorter career mode exclusive to Pro Skater 2x. Players are tasked with completing objectives in each level within the 2-minute timer. These include achieving a set high score, collecting the letters S-K-A-T-E, performing a certain trick on or over a certain object, and on certain levels, earning a top-three finish in a competition. Completion of these objectives is necessary to unlock new levels, skateboards, hidden characters, and stat points that can be spent to upgrade a character's attributes.

Along with graphical improvements to the game's remade levels and character models, some minor cosmetic changes were made to the environments (such as the addition of an air traffic control tower in the level "The Hangar"). Some features from Pro Skater 3 were included: female characters could be created in Create-a-Skater mode, and a visible balance meter was implemented for grinding. The revert is not included in 2x, but two of the exclusive levels allow for vert tricks to be landed in manuals to similarly extend combos. A "motion blur" camera effect was included in the game, a feature which would later return to the series with Tony Hawk's Underground 2. Point bonuses, which were scattered around the original levels featured in Pro Skater, were removed for this game; unlike in the original game, however, players can utilize the manual on these levels resulting in larger scores.

Though 2x featured no online play, up to eight players could compete via Xbox system link.

== Reception ==
Reception

Aggregate score
Aggregator	Score
Metacritic	78/100

Review scores
Publication	Score
Electronic Gaming Monthly	7.5/10 (Note: Three critics of Electronic Gaming Monthly gave the game each a score of 7.5/10, 7/10, and 8/10.)
EP Daily	9/10
Game Informer	8.5/10
GameSpot	7.7/10
GameSpy	84%
IGN	7.5/10
Next Generation	4/5
Official Xbox Magazine (US)	8.8/10
TeamXbox	(J.M.) 7.6/10 (S.B.) 7/10

The game received "generally favorable reviews" according to the review aggregation website Metacritic. Jeff Gerstmann of GameSpot called the game "the equivalent of a 'director's cut' edition, containing the original product and some nominal enhancements", but also thought that the game felt dated when comparing it to other Xbox games and Pro Skater 3 at the time. Vincent Lopez of IGN said that 2x contains more detailed characters and crisper textures on the game's environments, but thought that this package does not offer anything new other than its visuals. Blake Fischer of NextGen said, "If you've got an Xbox and [you] want some Hawk action, this is a great value. But if you've already played the first two games, pick up THPS3 on PS2 (or just wait for it to show up on Xbox)." Dan Elektro of GamePro said that the game "offers everything a fan of the first two games would want. It's a sweet package for your permanent library, but if you've played any earlier version and [you] aren't a Tony junkie, you can get by with a rental to check out the new stuff." (Note: GamePro gave the game two 4/5 scores for graphics and fun factor, and two 3.5/5 scores for sound and control.)

The game was nominated for the "Best Sports, Alternative Game" award at GameSpot's Best and Worst of 2001 Awards, which went to Tony Hawk's Pro Skater 3.
