= Tony Hawk's Pro Skater HD =

2012 video game

- Developer: Robomodo
- Publisher: Activision
- Series: Tony Hawk's
- Engine: Unreal Engine 3
- Platforms: Xbox 360; PlayStation 3; Microsoft Windows
- Release: Xbox 360; July 18, 2012; PlayStation 3 August 28, 2012; Windows; September 18, 2012
- Genre: Sports
- Modes: Single-player, multiplayer

Tony Hawk's Pro Skater HD is a 2012 skateboarding video game in the Tony Hawk's series. Developed by Robomodo and published by Activision, Pro Skater HD is a high-definition remake of classic levels from Tony Hawk's Pro Skater, Pro Skater 2, and, via download, Pro Skater 3. It was released in 2012 for Xbox 360 through Xbox Live Arcade on July 18, for PlayStation 3 through PlayStation Network on August 28 and Steam on September 18. The game was delisted from Steam and all other digital marketplaces on July 17, 2017.

== Gameplay ==
Developer Robomodo worked closely with Tony Hawk to recreate both gameplay and visuals in a new, high-definition environment. Top: Tony Hawk's Pro Skater HD; bottom: The original Tony Hawk's Pro Skater.

Tony Hawk's Pro Skater HD is a skateboarding video game, with an arcade-style emphasis with regard to realism. The objective is to score points by successfully completing various skateboarding tricks such as grinds, flip tricks, and aerials. Performing several moves in succession without any pause results in a combo. The player's score is multiplied by the number of tricks in the combo. If the player successfully lands the final trick the score is then banked, otherwise all points in that combo are lost.

Pro Skater HD is an amalgam of Tony Hawk's Pro Skater and Tony Hawk's Pro Skater 2, and as such the game does not feature any additional tricks or moves added to later games in the series. Tony Hawk's Pro Skater 3 downloadable content (DLC) was added. Included in the content is the ability to perform a revert, a trick which involves changing the direction of the board while keeping forward momentum. Originally this ability was only going to be limited for use in the levels that came with the DLC but due to the protracted release schedule, Robomodo released an update for the game that added the revert in all levels.

Players are also tasked with completing objectives in each level. In exchange for completion of these objectives players are rewarded with points that can be spent to upgrade a character's attributes. These include achieving a set high score, collecting the letters S-K-A-T-E, and finding a hidden DVD (in the same vein of the "Secret Tapes" from the first three games) within each level. In addition to the main gameplay mode other single and multiplayer modes are included. Big Head Survival is a new game mode in which the player character skates with their head becoming gradually inflated. In the case of Xbox 360 avatars the head is represented by a balloon in tow. If the player's head or balloon becomes too large it pops, ending the game. To keep the size down players must complete combos. Higher scores have a greater impact on decreasing the player character's head or balloon size.

Returning from Tony Hawk's Proving Ground is Hawkman, where the player must skate around the level collecting colored pellets with specific moves: yellow pellets must be collected during grinds, red during jumps, green during manuals, and blue while wallriding. When the player collects all pellets, or fails to collect them within the time limit for a high score, the game ends. Graffiti mode returns, and involves performing tricks on a series of objects. If a player successfully lands their trick(s), all objects the player touched will change to the player's designated color. If a second player achieves a higher score any objects that the second player touched, including any claimed by the first player, will change to the second player's color. The object is to claim the most objects by the end of the game. Online leaderboards are included for all modes, but online play is limited to the console versions.

Seven levels were selected from the original Pro Skater and Pro Skater 2, and include series staples such as Warehouse and School II. Mall, Hangar, Marseille, Downhill Jam, and Venice Beach are also included. The selection of skaters consist of classic skaters such as Tony Hawk and Rodney Mullen, as well as other professional skaters Eric Koston, Nyjah Huston, Andrew Reynolds, Lyn-Z Adams Hawkins Pastrana, Chris Cole and Riley Hawk, son of Tony Hawk. The first update of the game also adds Jake Harrison and Emily Westlund to the initial roster. Two fictional bonus characters return, Officer Dick and Ollie the Magic Bum, who have appeared several times in the series. A new bonus character, a robot named Roberta, is also included. The Xbox 360 version also allows players to play with their avatars. Downloadable content has been released featuring three levels from Tony Hawk's Pro Skater 3 (Airport, Canada, and Los Angeles) with extra playable characters including pros Geoff Rowley and Steve Caballero along with James Hetfield and Robert Trujillo from Metallica. The pack also includes one new song from the band, "All Nightmare Long".

== Development ==
The game was first announced at the 2011 Spike Video Game Awards show (VGAs) with a trailer demonstrating Tony Hawk skating around the Woodland Hills Warehouse (the first stage of the original game). It is the first Tony Hawk's game on consoles that was offered exclusively as a downloadable game. It is a return to the gameplay of the original games in the series, predating Tony Hawk: Ride, and as such could only be played using a standard controller. The game is not a high-definition port of the original Tony Hawk's Pro Skater, but rather an amalgamation of levels collected from the first two installments, remade using Unreal Engine 3 for Microsoft Windows, PlayStation 3 and Xbox 360. Downloadable content from Tony Hawk's Pro Skater 3 was confirmed on July 3, prior to the game's release, featuring levels Airport, Los Angeles, and Canada, and ability to perform reverts on those levels. Professional skaters Steve Caballero and Geoff Rowley were added in the pack.

=== Soundtrack ===
The soundtrack contains the songs from the first two Tony Hawk's Pro Skater games with the other half containing new songs. Seven are new ones, while other seven are taken from the first two Pro Skater games; one from Tony Hawk's Pro Skater, and six from Pro Skater 2. Developer Robomodo was given charge of the soundtrack. In regards to the choice of new songs, lead designer Patrick Dwyer explained that choice: "We wanted to pick new songs that had that potential where, five years from now, people hear the songs and they think of this game".

== Reception ==
Tony Hawk's Pro Skater HD

Aggregate scores
Aggregator	Score
GameRankings	67.61% (X360)
Metacritic	66/100 (X360)

Review scores
Publication	Score
G4	4.5/5
GameSpot	6/10
GamesRadar+	2/5
GameTrailers	7.4/10
Giant Bomb	3/5
IGN	8/10
Official Xbox Magazine (US)	8/10

Tony Hawk's Pro Skater HD received mixed reviews upon release. It holds aggregates scores of 67.61% at GameRankings and 66 out of 100 at Metacritic. Review scores range from a 40% approval ratio from Lucas Sullivan of GamesRadar to a 90% approval from Alex Rubens of G4TV. The majority of scores at both GameRankings and Metacritic were at or above a 60% approval ratio.

IGN's Nic Vargas gave the game a score of 8/10, praising its purist gameplay whilst lamenting the lack of certain modes such as park creator and split screen multiplayer. The reviewer from GameTrailers gave the game a score of 7.4 and said that Pro Skater HD "isn't flawless, but... it at least gets off on the right foot". Lucas Sullivan of GamesRadar felt that old-school fans of the franchise will be disappointed by what the game lacks, and gamers who never played the original games on PS1 will find the mechanics and level design sparse. Destructoid gave the game 4.5/10, stating that the execution isn't handled as well as the original titles, as well as some of the design choices the developer made. G4TV gave the game a 4.5/5 and praised the console versions' online multiplayer and soundtrack. Official Xbox Magazine gave Pro Skater HD an 8/10. They praised the game's new big head mode.
