= Kareem Campbell =

American skateboarder

Personal information
- Born: November 14, 1973 (age 52) Harlem, New York, U.S.
- Occupation: Skateboarder
- Years active: 1989–present

Sport
- Country: United States
- Sport: Skateboarding
- Turned pro: 1992

Kareem Campbell (born November 14, 1973) is an American professional skateboarder. He is known for popularizing the skateboard trick "The Ghetto Bird" which is a nollie hardflip late 180°.

== Skateboarding career ==
Kareem Campbell was an innovative professional skateboarder in the 1990s. He was featured in the World Industries videos New World Order, 20 Shot Sequence, and Trilogy, which are regarded as classics to many skateboarders. He has been called the godfather of smooth street style. He eventually went on to spawn another company of his own under the Dwindle Distribution umbrella, though he continued to ride for World Industries. He also helped found Axion Shoes. After Menace, he went on to create City Stars Skateboards also under the same Dwindle Distribution umbrella. He still operates City Star Skateboards to this day.

Campbell rose to mainstream fame in 1999 following his inclusion as a playable character in the Tony Hawk's Pro Skater video game series. Tony Hawk also credited him with increasing skateboarding's standing in the Black community. Campbell would later reprise his role in the 2020 remake of the first two games in the series.

Throughout his career Kareem has been sponsored by World Industries, Axion Shoes, Nixon Watches, Alphanumeric Clothing and more.

== Personal life ==
Campbell is from Harlem, New York, and moved with his family to Los Angeles in his early youth.

Campbell now resides in Dallas, Texas and works in a variety of business ventures, notably real estate. His nephew is professional skateboarder, musician, and Odd Future associate Na-kel Smith.
