= Tony Hawk: Shred =

2010 video game

- Developers: Robomodo; Buzz Monkey (Wii)
- Publisher: Activision
- Series: Tony Hawk's
- Platforms: PlayStation 3; Wii; Xbox 360
- Release: NA: October 26, 2010; EU: October 29, 2010
- Genre: Sports
- Modes: Single-player, multiplayer

Tony Hawk: Shred is a 2010 peripheral-based, motion-controlled skateboarding video game. It is part of the Tony Hawk's series and the sequel to Tony Hawk: Ride.

Shred introduces a snowboarding mode to the series as well as Avatar and Mii support on the Xbox 360 and Wii versions respectively. A "surfing" mode was worked on for the game, but was soon scrapped due to funds and short amount of time to work on it.

On May 8th 2025, YouTuber Blaster Goblin accidentally became the Speedrun World record holder for Tony Hawk: Shred with a time of 01:49:25.

== Reception and hiatus ==
The initial price for the game was $120 for a bundle including the skateboard controller and approximately $50 for the stand-alone game. During its first week on sale in the United States, the game sold 3,000 copies; combined with the mixed to negative reception, the Tony Hawk franchise was put on hold until Tony Hawk's Pro Skater HD was released in 2012.

Reception

Aggregate score
Aggregator	Score
Metacritic	X360: 53/100; PS3: 56/100

Review score
Publication	Score
Computer Games Magazine	2/10
