= Shaba Games =

American video game developer

Shaba Games LLC
- Industry: Video games
- Founded: September 1997; 28 years ago
- Defunct: October 8, 2009; 16 years ago
- Headquarters: San Francisco, California, U.S.
- Parent: Activision (2002–2009)

Shaba Games LLC was an American video game developer founded in September 1997. It was located in San Francisco, California. Initially it was a nine-person development team, with the founders having split off from Crystal Dynamics, more specifically from the team behind Pandemonium 2. It was acquired by Activision in 2002. Activision closed the studio on October 8, 2009.

== Games developed ==
Year	Game	Platform(s)
2000	Grind Session	PlayStation
2000	Razor Freestyle Scooter	PlayStation
2001	Mat Hoffman's Pro BMX	PlayStation
2001	Tony Hawk's Pro Skater 3	PlayStation
2003	Wakeboarding Unleashed Featuring Shaun Murray	PlayStation 2, Xbox
2005	Tony Hawk's Underground 2: Remix	PlayStation Portable
2005	Shrek SuperSlam	GameCube, Microsoft Windows, PlayStation 2, Xbox
2006	Tony Hawk's Project 8	PlayStation 2, Xbox
2007	Shrek the Third	PlayStation 2, Wii, Xbox 360
2008	Spider-Man: Web of Shadows	Microsoft Windows, PlayStation 3, Wii, Xbox 360
