= Tony Hawk's Proving Ground =

2007 video game

- North American cover art
- Developers: Neversoft; Page 44 Studios (PS2 & Wii); Vicarious Visions (DS)
- Publisher: Activision
- Series: Tony Hawk's
- Platforms: Nintendo DS; PlayStation 2; PlayStation 3; Wii; Xbox 360; Mobile phone
- Release: NA: October 16, 2007; AU: October 17, 2007 (DS, PS2, X360); AU: October 31, 2007 (PS3, Wii); EU: November 2, 2007; Mobile: NA: 2008
- Genre: Sports
- Modes: Single-player, multiplayer

Tony Hawk's Proving Ground is a 2007 skateboarding video game developed by Neversoft for the PlayStation 3 and Xbox 360, Vicarious Visions for the Nintendo DS, and by Page 44 Studios for the PlayStation 2 and Wii. Proving Ground is the ninth installment in the Tony Hawk's series, and the last to be developed by Neversoft as the franchise was then transferred to Robomodo, and Neversoft was later shut down after being merged into Infinity Ward in 2014.

== Gameplay ==
Proving Ground features gameplay that is more reminiscent of earlier Tony Hawk games, whilst including new features such as Nail-The-Manual and Nail-The-Grab. These are similar to the Nail-The-Trick mode from the previous game, Tony Hawk's Project 8.

=== Single-player ===
There are 9 levels in the game. They are in 3 East Coast cities, Baltimore, Philadelphia, and Washington, D.C. The levels differ between the different console versions. In the Xbox 360 and PlayStation 3 versions, there is one open world. In the Wii and PlayStation 2 versions, levels have to be selected by pausing the game. Three different types of goals in Story Mode are available; Rigger, Career, and Hardcore. In each level, there are two arcade machines, one for high scores and the other to play classic mode. This game has three Nail the Trick modes (Nail the Trick, Nail the Grab, and Nail the Manual). The PlayStation 2 and Wii versions do not include Nail the Manual, Bowl Skating and the Mod Tool. The Classic Mode feature allows the player to play each city section in the style of early Pro Skater games. There is a Free Skate mode on the Nintendo DS version.

=== Multiplayer ===
The game is the first installment in the Tony Hawk's series which allows online features via the PlayStation Network. One can host or join an online party, which allows up to 4 players, who are able to free-roam in one of the three cities. The players can also invite other players to their Skate Lounge, a fully-customisable warehouse in Philadelphia, where one can put ramps, rails, items, and even challenges.

== Reception ==
Reception

Aggregate score
Aggregator	Score
Metacritic	(DS) 79/100 (PS3) 73/100 (X360) 72/100 (PS2) 65/100 (Wii) 57/100

Review scores
Publication	Score
Eurogamer	(X360/PS3) 7/10
GameSpot	(DS) 8/10 (X360/PS3) 6.5/10 (PS2/Wii) 5/10
GameSpy	(PS2) 3.5/5
GamesRadar+	(X360/PS3) 4.5/5 (DS) 4/5
GameZone	(PS3) 9.2/10
IGN	(DS) 8/10 (X360/PS3) 7.1/10 (PS2) 6.9/10 (Wii) 4/10
Nintendo World Report	(DS) 9/10
Pocket Gamer	(DS) 4/5
VideoGamer.com	(X360/PS3) 7/10

Proving Ground was met with mixed to positive reviews upon release. On Metacritic, the PlayStation 3 version has an average score of 73, the Xbox 360 version has an average score of 72, the PlayStation 2 version has an average score of 65, and the Wii version has an average score of 57. All of these scores are considered "mixed or average" by the site. The PlayStation 2 and Nintendo Wii versions were criticized for not having the same mechanics that are in the PlayStation 3 and Xbox 360 versions. The Nintendo DS version received generally favorable reviews from critics. On Metacritic it received an average score of 79 out of 100 based on 21 reviews. On GameRankings it received an average score of 78% based on 19 reviews. Notably however, the game received a 9/10 from the Official UK Xbox Magazine. The Official UK PlayStation Magazine awarded the game 7/10.
