= Tony Hawk's Project 8 =

2006 video game

- Developer: Neversoft (Note: Ported to PlayStation 2 & Xbox by Shaba Games and to PlayStation Portable by Page 44 Studios. Mobile version developed by InfoSpace.)
- Publisher: Activision
- Series: Tony Hawk's
- Platforms: PlayStation 2; Xbox; Xbox 360; PlayStation 3; PlayStation Portable
- Release: PlayStation 2, Xbox, Xbox 360: NA: November 7, 2006; AU: November 15, 2006; EU: November 17, 2006; PlayStation 3: NA: November 17, 2006; PAL: March 23, 2007; PlayStation Portable: NA: November 21, 2006; AU: March 8, 2007; EU: June 8, 2007; Mobile: NA: January 2007
- Genre: Sports
- Modes: Single-player, multiplayer

Tony Hawk's Project 8 is a 2006 skateboarding video game and the eighth installment in the Tony Hawk's series. It was developed by Neversoft and published by Activision in November 2006 for the PlayStation 2, Xbox, Xbox 360, PlayStation 3, and PlayStation Portable. The game complements the release of Tony Hawk's Downhill Jam, which was conversely available on Nintendo systems along with the PlayStation 2 respectively. It received mostly positive reviews. With praise towards the "Nail the Trick" feature and graphics, while the removal of several key features and the absence of online functionality across all three PlayStation versions were criticized.

== Plot ==
Tony Hawk, impressed with the undiscovered skate talent in the player's town, announces the creation of a new skating team entitled 'Project 8', where eight of the town's best skateboarders will be selected for the team. The player character starts ranked 200th and by completing challenges and goals, their ranking will gradually improve.

== Gameplay ==
The 6th-generation versions of the game (PlayStation 2, Xbox) as well as the PlayStation Portable version utilize the engine of the previous installment, Tony Hawk's American Wasteland, and the games that preceded it. The 7th-generation versions (PlayStation 3, Xbox 360) feature a completely new game engine and gameplay to accommodate the more advanced hardware. The PSP version is the only version of the game to include an additional Classic Mode, which features goals in levels from past Tony Hawk games on a two-minute timer.

For the 7th-generation versions, Project 8 features an open world, which contains various skate parks and hidden sections. The open world is linear and visibly connected, in contrast to the loading tunnels in American Wasteland. In the 6th-generation version, the levels are separate and have to be manually selected. There are 45 skaters in the game, including unlockable characters, who each have a unique mo-cap style, providing a different experience and no recycled animations.

=== New features ===
The game introduces the 'nail the trick' option. When a player enters this mode the camera will zoom in on the side to focus on the skateboard and the character's feet. Players are then able to use the right analog and left analog sticks to control the right and left feet, allowing the player to flip and rotate the board in any such manner, including tapping the underside of the board in the air and merging various techniques to form new moves.

Another new ability in the game is to control the characters in the game during bails, allowing the player to obtain a high "Hospital bill", with bonus money awarded for broken bones; this feature is used in numerous challenges across the story mode (on PS3 and Xbox 360). Players can also induce a bail manually. The option to walk, which was introduced in Tony Hawk's Underground, is retained. The game also features a system named "Stokens"; landing combos in front of pedestrians will "stoke" them and give Stokens, which the player can then use to buy items in-game. In the 7th-generation versions, knocking over a pedestrian will cause them to chase the skater and retaliate, but the player is able to evade this if they skate far enough away.

== Reception ==
Reception

Aggregate score
Aggregator	Score
Metacritic	(X360) 81/100 (PS3) 76/100 (PS2) 69/100 (PSP) 68/100 (XBOX) 67/100

Review scores
Publication	Score
Eurogamer	(X360) 9/10
GameRevolution	(X360) 6/10
GameSpot	(PS3) 7.3/10 (X360) 7.9/10 (PSP) 6.6/10
GameSpy	(PS3) 2.5/5 (X360) 3.5/5 (PS2) 3.5/5 (XBOX) 3.5/5 (PSP) 3/5
GamesRadar+	(PS2) 3.5/5 (XBOX) 3.5/5 (PSP) 3.5/5
GameZone	(X360) 8.7/10 (PSP) 6.2/10
IGN	(X360/PS3) 7.8/10 (PSP) 6/10
Pocket Gamer	(PSP/Mobile) 4/5

The game was met with mostly positive reviews upon release, with the Xbox 360 version garnering an overall average of 81% on GameRankings. It was especially the subject of praise for its "Nail the Trick" mode and graphical enhancements. It received criticism for the removal of several key features.

In the GameSpot review of the PlayStation 3 version, Project 8 was criticized for its unstable frame rate. IGN and GameSpot noted and criticized the absence of online functionality across all three PlayStation versions.

The Academy of Interactive Arts & Sciences awarded Tony Hawk's Project 8 with "Sports Game of the Year" at the 10th Annual Interactive Achievement Awards.
