= Tony Hawk's American Sk8land =

2005 video game

- Developer: Vicarious Visions
- Publisher: Activision
- Designer: Leo Zuniga
- Series: Tony Hawk's
- Platforms: Game Boy Advance, Nintendo DS
- Release: NA: October 18, 2005 (GBA); NA: November 15, 2005 (NDS); EU: November 18, 2005
- Genre: Sports
- Modes: Single-player, multiplayer

Tony Hawk's American Sk8land is a skateboarding video game in the Tony Hawk's series. The game, a companion title to Tony Hawk's American Wasteland, was published by Activision in 2005 as the first handheld release in the series for the Nintendo DS, and the fifth to appear on Game Boy Advance. It was the first third-party game released for the Nintendo DS supporting online play.

== Plot ==
The game focuses on a young up-and-coming skateboarder from the Midwest. After dominating a local competition, they are approached by Tony Hawk, who offers to take them to L.A. so they can immerse themselves in the 'West Coast style' of skateboarding. Upon arriving, they run into Mindy, a local skate enthusiast and aspiring comic artist who dreams of publishing her own comic called American Sk8teland, named after a famous skatepark Tony used to frequent. Upon seeing how dilapidated the place has become, the group decide to renovate the place and restore it to its former glory.

As the renovations progress and other pro skaters lend their support, Mindy informs the group that a publishing office in East L.A. wants to distribute her work, provided she supply them with a comic detailing American Sk8teland's return to prominence. However, Tony reveals that the park's owner has accepted an offer to sell the place, and they have two weeks to match the offer before it's torn down. After helping Rodney Mullen pull off a successful flatland demo, Mindy, upon noticing people were filming the demo, realizes they can make a similar video with the pros who helped make the park famous. Once the repairs are finished, the group films the pros doing various tricks and stunts around the park, culminating in Tony convincing the new skateboarder to pull off a Japan 900 to close out the demo. The video is a huge success when released, giving Tony the money needed to purchase American Sk8teland and Mindy the material needed to start her comic.

== Description ==
American Sk8land uses cel-shaded visuals and it was developed by Vicarious Visions, the developer of the Game Boy Advance Tony Hawk games. The game is based on its console counterpart, American Wasteland, featuring the same soundtrack, and many of the same environments and characters.

The top screen is used to display the main gameplay, while the touch screen displays an overhead map of the area the player is currently skating, as well as icons for easily performing tricks. The touch screen is also used to create skateboard art. Furthering the use of the DS's functions is the ability to record, with the DS microphone, sound clips for use in the game.

American Sk8land was the first Nintendo DS game released by a third party to support the Nintendo Wi-Fi Connection, the online service for the Nintendo DS. Players are able to play Trick Attack, Score Challenge, Combo Mambo and The Price is Wrong. Players are also able to upload or download graffiti, board art, high scores, and replays to one of the servers, and can periodically download new goals to complete.

In the DS version, the ability to get off the skateboard and walk around was removed; however, this was somewhat balanced by the ability to come to a complete stop and rotate the camera.

The name is shared by the Game Boy Advance version, also created by Vicarious Visions. The GBA version does not share the same graphics, however, having an isometric point of view, polygonal skaters and pre-rendered levels creating a 3D sensation.

== Reception ==
Tony Hawk's American Sk8land received "generally positive" reviews according to review aggregator Metacritic.

Reception

Aggregate score
Aggregator	Score
Metacritic	(GBA) 64/100 (DS) 84/100

Review scores
Publication	Score
Eurogamer	8/10
GameRevolution	7/10
GameSpot	(GBA) 6/10 (DS) 8.4/10
GameSpy	4.5/5
GamesRadar+	3.5/5
GameZone	(GBA) 7/10 (DS) 8.9/10
IGN	8.8/10
Nintendo World Report	9/10
Pocket Gamer	4/5

== Awards ==
- IGN: Editors' Choice Award
