= Tony Hawk: Ride =

2009 video game

- Developers: Robomodo (PS3 & X360); Buzz Monkey (Wii)
- Publisher: Activision
- Series: Tony Hawk's
- Platforms: PlayStation 3; Xbox 360; Wii
- Release: NA: November 17, 2009; EU: December 4, 2009; AU: March 10, 2010
- Genre: Sports
- Modes: Single-player, multiplayer

Tony Hawk: Ride is a peripheral-based, motion-controlled skateboarding video game and part of the Tony Hawk's series. In Europe and North America, the game was released in 2009 for PlayStation 3, Xbox 360 and Wii. In Australia, it was released in 2010.

== Gameplay ==
In Ride, the player uses the skateboard peripheral to simulate the riding of an actual skateboard in the game. The peripheral, shaped like a real skateboard, is equipped with infrared sensors to detect motion and display it on-screen. Turning, leaning, hopping, and other actions were meant to reflect in the game realistically. In Road Trip mode, the player would now complete different disciplines, such as speed, trick and challenge. The Pro Challenge features numerous of skaters, such as Cara-Beth Burnside, Mike Mo Capaldi, Paul Rodriguez, Mike Vallely, Dustin Dollin, Stevie Williams, Lyn-Z Adams Hawkins, Steve Nesser, Ryan Sheckler, Christian Hosoi, Rodney Mullen, Nyjah Huston and Tony Hawk. On the speed session, the player can battle against the clock as quickly as possible to get the fastest time, called speed run. In slalom mode, the player can pass through the number of gates as quickly as possible. Trick session affects the player to pull off the tricks for the highest score with a time limit. In Challenge session, the player can skate through a series of five different challenges.

== Development ==
In February 2008, publisher Activision said that the game was undergoing research and testing. The publisher also said at the time that the game would be a "re-engineering [for] the franchise" and said that there would be "a new direction for the brand".

Later in May, Activision spoke more about the new game. During a quarterly earnings conference, the company again confirmed that the new game would "deliver the kind of breakthrough this franchise needs". At the same time, Activision confirmed that the new game would not be released in 2008, but was scheduled to be out before their 2010 fiscal year ends. This would put the window of release between April 1, 2009 and March 31, 2010.

On December 3, Activision revealed a new motion sensing balance board peripheral that players would "put down the controller, step on the board, and feel the sensation of going big, shift the weight to turn and balance grinds, kick back on the tail of the board to ollie, and lean into airs to pull off huge spins". The title was revealed to be Tony Hawk: Ride in May 2009. The soundtrack is also confirmed, including The Fold with their track "Neverender" and Green Day's "Murder City".

The Tony Hawk: Ride game board was designed and engineered by Product council, the Chicago-based design and innovation firm.

== Reception ==
Reception

Aggregate score
Aggregator	Score
Metacritic	X360: 46/100; PS3: 44/100; Wii: 47/100

Review scores
Publication	Score
Destructoid	2/10
Eurogamer	4/10
GameRevolution	2/10
GamesRadar+	2/5
Giant Bomb	1/5
IGN	5/10
Nintendo World Report	4.5/10
The Guardian	3/5
VideoGamer.com	4/10

Tony Hawk: Ride received negative reviews from critics. The Metacritic average score of 46, 44, and 47 for the Xbox 360, PlayStation 3, and Wii versions respectively indicates "generally unfavorable reviews". GameTrailers gave Tony Hawk: Ride a score 4.6 and named it Most Disappointing Game of 2009, while IGN gave the game a 5.0. Both G4TV and Giant Bomb rated it 1/5. GameSpot gave it a 3.5/10, with the only positive emblem the game received being that the peripheral was "sturdy".

GamesRadar gave the game 4/10. They also named it the worst game of the year, using its skateboard peripheral as the trophy for the "Anti-Awards" feature. Game Informer gave it a 5.75, remarking that "as a skateboarder and as a gamer, Tony Hawk: Ride is a curious idea but a letdown in practice. The huge level of frustration is not worth the time it takes to master the awkward gameplay idiosyncrasies".

=== Sales ===
In the first month of its U.S. release, Tony Hawk: Ride sold 114,000 copies.

== Sequel ==
Tony Hawk revealed that a sequel to Tony Hawk: Ride was already planned prior to the first game's release in November. Snowboarding and surfing were mentioned as possible priorities. He confirmed that he was working with Robomodo on the sequel in January 2010.

Activision Publishing's CEO, Mike Griffith, said that "it took longer to optimize the hardware, leaving less time to optimize the software", when asked about the development of the original game. A new title, Tony Hawk: Shred, was released in October 2010. It also used the Ride peripheral, but a new design was featured on top of the board.
