= 360 Kickflip =

Skateboarding trick

The 360 Kickflip, 360 Flip, Trè Flip or 3 Flip is a skateboarding trick invented by Rodney Mullen. This trick is a combination of a 360 pop shove-it and a kickflip.

The 360 Kickflip has become a standard street trick and has also come to be one of the most recognizable. The 360 flips are often stylized by catching with the front foot first. Its heelflip variation is the laser flip.

== See also ==
- Skateboarding trick
- Flip trick
