= Pole jam =

Skateboarding trick

A pole jam is a skateboarding trick maneuver that skateboarders do over a bent pole. A pole jam is an action that skateboarders do when they approach a bent pole and they then continue to ride up and over the top of the pole. (The ollie is not generally used to get into the pole jam.)

Typically the pole used is bent down into an acute angle, so that grinding or sliding it is easier.

Pole jams can be combined with other skateboard tricks performed when coming out of the grind.

Tricks that can be used in a pole jam include:

- Grinds and Slides on the pole jam
- Flips and Grabs into or out of the Grind or Slide
- no-comply grinds
- boneless grinds and slides
- pre-grab grinds and slides

Pole Jams are also used by snowboarders for similar purposes.
