= Nightmare flip =

Skateboarding trick

The nightmare flip (also known as a nightmare kickflip hyperflip, nightmare varial flip or varial double kickflip), is an aerial skateboarding trick. The trick features a shuv it with a double kickflip simultaneously.

== Description ==
To perform the nightmare flip aerial trick, the skateboarder kicks their board in order to make it flip 720 degrees along the board's long axis, while turning in a 180 degree motion toward the toe edge of the board, essentially combining a double kickflip, and a pop shove it. This trick is also called a varial double flip.

== Inventor ==
It was most likely invented by Rodney Mullen, an early skateboarder. However, it is also possible that it is simply a variation on one of his tricks, created by someone else.
