= Indy grab =

Type of aerial sports trick

An Indy grab, also known as an Indy air, is an aerial skateboarding, snowboarding, surfing, and kitesurfing trick during which the rider grabs their back hand on the middle of their board, between their feet, on the side of the board where their toes are pointing. The Indy grab is a generic skateboarding trick that has been performed since the late 1970s. This trick is performed mainly while vert skating, e.g. on halfpipes. Although this move can be done on flat land, it is much easier on a ramp. The Indy grab is one of the basic tricks in vert skating and is usually combined with spins, kickflips, and heelflips.

== Skateboarding ==
The Indy air was originally called the Gunnair, which was invented by Gunnar Haugo in 1977. By 1980, the trick was renamed the Indy air, after the Independent Truck Company by skateboarder Duane Peters (who popularized this grab around 1980). The trick involves doing a backside air while gripping one's board on the toe side, between the feet with the trailing hand. If the board is grabbed during a frontside air, the trick is simply called a "frontside air", as opposed to a frontside ollie, in which there is no grab. Many variations have come into existence as skaters push the limits of creativity and physical exertion. Two of the most popular variations are the kickflip Indy and Indy nosebone.

The term Indy grab may also be misapplied to any aerial in which the rider grabs the toe side of their board with their trailing hand (as in snowboarding). This confusion is partly due to the name being applied to all such grabs in the Tony Hawk's Pro Skater video game.

== Snowboarding ==
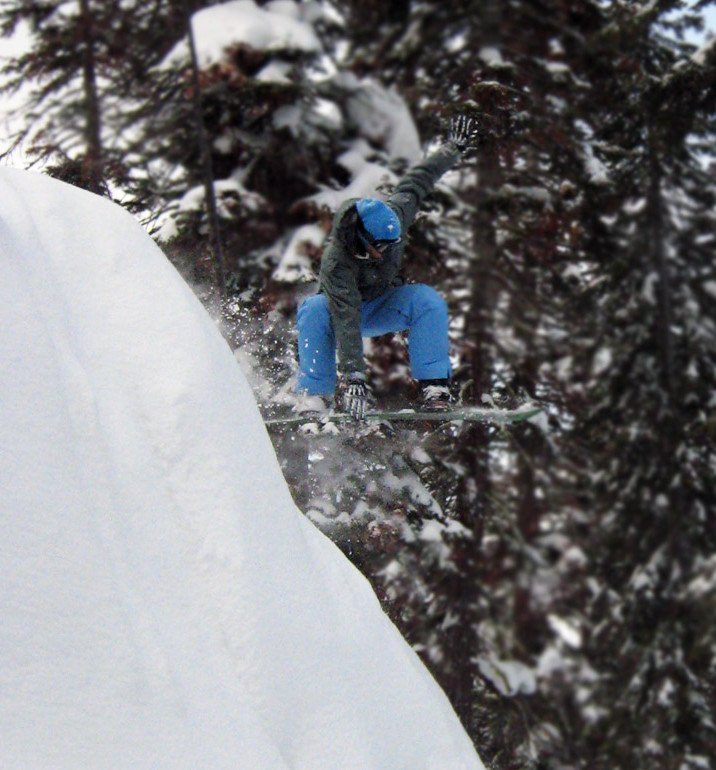
An indy grab performed on a snowboard.

Many tricks in snowboarding owe their names to similar maneuvers done on a skateboard. However, there can be differences between the original skateboarding trick and the snowboarding equivalent. The Indy grab in skateboarding requires a backsides maneuver. However, in snowboarding it is common for all grabs performed by grabbing the toe edge between the bindings with the back hand to be referred to as an Indy grab, especially when done outside of a halfpipe. Therefore it is possible to do an Indy grab on a snowboard going either frontside, backside, or simply "straight airing" . A similar grab is the Tindy, where a rider grabs behind their back foot but in front of the tail with the same hand. This grab is usually considered bad form.
