= Ricky Glaser =

Australian skateboarder

Personal information
- Full name: Ricky Glaser
- Born: 12 October 1991 (age 34) Melbourne, Australia
- Height: 5 ft 10 in (1.78 m)
- Weight: 176.37 lb (80.00 kg)

Sport
- Country: Australia
- Sport: Skateboarding

Ricky Glaser (born 12 October 1991) is a regular-footed professional skateboarder from Melbourne, Australia.

== Career ==
Glaser began skating at age 8. He is known for performing unique and crazy skateboarding tricks. Glaser set a Guinness World Record for the Most skateboard kickflips in one minute in April 2012 where he performed 36 kickflips.

In August 2020, Glaser moved to the United States and joined the Braille Skateboarding Team.
