= Flip trick =

Skateboarding trick

A flip trick is a type of skateboarding trick in which the skateboard rotates around its vertical axis, or its vertical axis and its horizontal axis simultaneously. The first flip trick, called a kickflip but originally known as a "magic flip", was invented by professional skateboarder Rodney Mullen.

== General terms ==
The following is a list of general skateboarding terms that will assist novice readers to better understand the descriptions of flip tricks contained in this article:

=== Frontside and backside ===
The concepts of frontside and backside originate from surfing, whereby the terms defined the position of the surfer in relation to the wave.

- "Frontside" – executing a trick, whereby your front side faces the direction of travel or the obstacle that is the subject of the trick. This is counterclockwise for regular-footed riders and clockwise for goofy-footed riders.
- "Backside" – opposite of frontside, backside flip tricks are executed with the rider's back facing the direction of travel or the obstacle that is the subject of the trick. This is clockwise for regular-footed riders and counterclockwise for goofy-footed riders.

=== Nollie ===
An abbreviated form of the title "nose ollie", a nollie is an ollie executed at the front of the skateboard when the rider shifts their stance from the bottom to the top of the board. The rider then uses their front foot, instead of their back foot, to pop the board upwards.

=== Switch ===
Switch is a stance on the board that is opposite to one's natural stance. For example, riding with your left foot forwards as opposed to normally riding with your right foot forwards. A "regular" skater's switch stance is "goofy", and vice versa.

=== Fakie ===
First executed by Eddie Elguera during the 1970s, "fakie" is a skateboarding stance in which the skater is in his normal stance; however rolling backwards(towards the back foot). .

=== Pop Shuvit/Shuvit ===
A "shuvit" involves rotating the skateboard in a 180-degree motion without flipping the board. It involves pushing (or "popping") the tail while also shoving the board under the rider's feet. While the board rotates beneath the rider, he/she maintains the same position in the air. If performed with a larger rotation, the trick is named according to the extent of the rotation: a 360-, 540-degree, etc. shuvit. Professional skateboarder Christophe "Willow" Wildgrube performed a frontside 360-degree pop shuvit for the "Trickipedia" section of The Berrics website.

=== Grind ===
For the execution of a grind, one makes moving contact with an object using the axles between the wheels, called trucks. Numerous variations have been invented, whereby flip tricks are combined with grinds, such as the 'kickflip 50-50', 'nollie flip crooked grind', or 'crooked grind nollie flip out'.

=== Slides ===
In a slide, one makes contact with an object using any part of the wooden deck construction of the skateboard, including the griptape, and moves along the object. Numerous variations have been invented, whereby flip tricks are combined with slides, such as the "kickflip boardslide" and the "kickflip tailslide".

=== Grabs ===
Grabs are a skateboarding trick usually executed on transitional terrain, in the air between takeoff and landing. They consist of the rider holding on to any part of the skateboard while in air. They can also be executed on flat ground—for example, a "boneless" is a grab trick performed on flat ground, whereby one foot is used to lift off the ground and the other is used to grab the skateboard. Numerous variations have been invented, whereby flip tricks are combined with grabs, such as the "kickflip indy grab".

== List of flip tricks ==
The fundamental list of flip tricks include the pop shove-it, Frontside pop shove it, kickflip and heelflip. Combinations and variations were then derived from these basic tricks, such as the kickflip shove-it (varial kickflip), heelflip front sideshove-it (varial heelflip), hardflip, inward heelflip, 360 flip, nollie flip, nollie heelflip, nollie 360 flip, fakie kickflip, fakie heelflip, fakie 360 flip and the laser flip (heelflip 360 fs shuvit).

All tricks can be performed in any of the four stances— natural, fakie, switch, and nollie—and all flip tricks can be performed frontside or backside. When the board spins on both axes, it is more common for both to spin in the opposite direction, such as with 360 flips and laser flips; however, the board flips along congruent angles for hardflips and inward heelflips.

=== Finger flip ===
A finger flip requires the skateboarder to flip the board in any direction using their fingers on the nose or tail; the first ollie finger flip was invented by Mullen in 1986. Mullen has been filmed executing finger flip 360-flips and Tony Hawk executed the first finger flip in 'vert' skateboarding (skateboarding on ramp structures that consist of vertical transition).

=== Original kickflip ===
This was the first version of the kickflip, whereby the rider hooks one foot under the board to create the flipping motion. Mullen explained to Canadian magazine, SBC Skateboarding:

People were doing the original Kickflips, where you hook your foot over the side, and the set-up was so rotten. You had to stand parallel [like a skier]. People tried that trick on banks, and rolled in standing like that and fell straight back. I understood that this trick needed no set-up, and it'd be an important move—for me, at least. I knew it gave me a whole new doorway to go through.

=== Kickflip ===
Skateboarder performs a kickflip.

When a skateboarder flips the board 360 degrees on its horizontal axis by flicking the corner of the board towards the backside of the skater—the trick was invented by Mullen in 1982 in a Floridian farmhouse. Instances of multiple spins are named according to how many spins are completed (e.g. double kickflip, triple kickflip, etc.)—professional skateboarder Daewon Song was filmed in 2010, performing both a double and triple kickflip, in a web video entitled "Daewon Dorking Around at DVS".

=== Heelflip ===
Similar to a kickflip, the heelflip is instead executed with the heel section flipping away from the skater this time. For a regular-footed skater (left foot in front) the board spins clockwise from the perspective of a view from behind the skater. Again, a kick formulates part of the ollie, but unlike the kickflip, the kick is directed forward and outwards, away from the rider's toe side (diagonal), so that the last part of the foot to leave the board is the heel—hence the name. The trick was invented by Mullen in 1982. Instances of multiple spins are named according to how many spins are completed (e.g. double heelflip, triple heelflip, etc.)—skateboard videographer, Jon Fistemanu, is filmed executing a double heelflip in a 2010 web video entitled "Daewon Dorking Around at DVS".

=== Frontside/Backside 180 kickflip ===
A kickflip combined with a frontside or backside 180-degree ollie—the trick is also known as a frontside or backside flip. The backside 180 kickflip was invented by Mullen in 1984. Professional skateboarder Andrew Reynolds performed a frontside kickflip for the "Trickipedia" section of The Berrics website. Professional skateboarder (and co-owner of The Berrics) Steve Berra performed a backside kickflip for the "Trickipedia" section of his website. Multiple spins can also be incorporated into this trick and a frontside 180 double kickflip was filmed for the "Skateology" web-based video series.

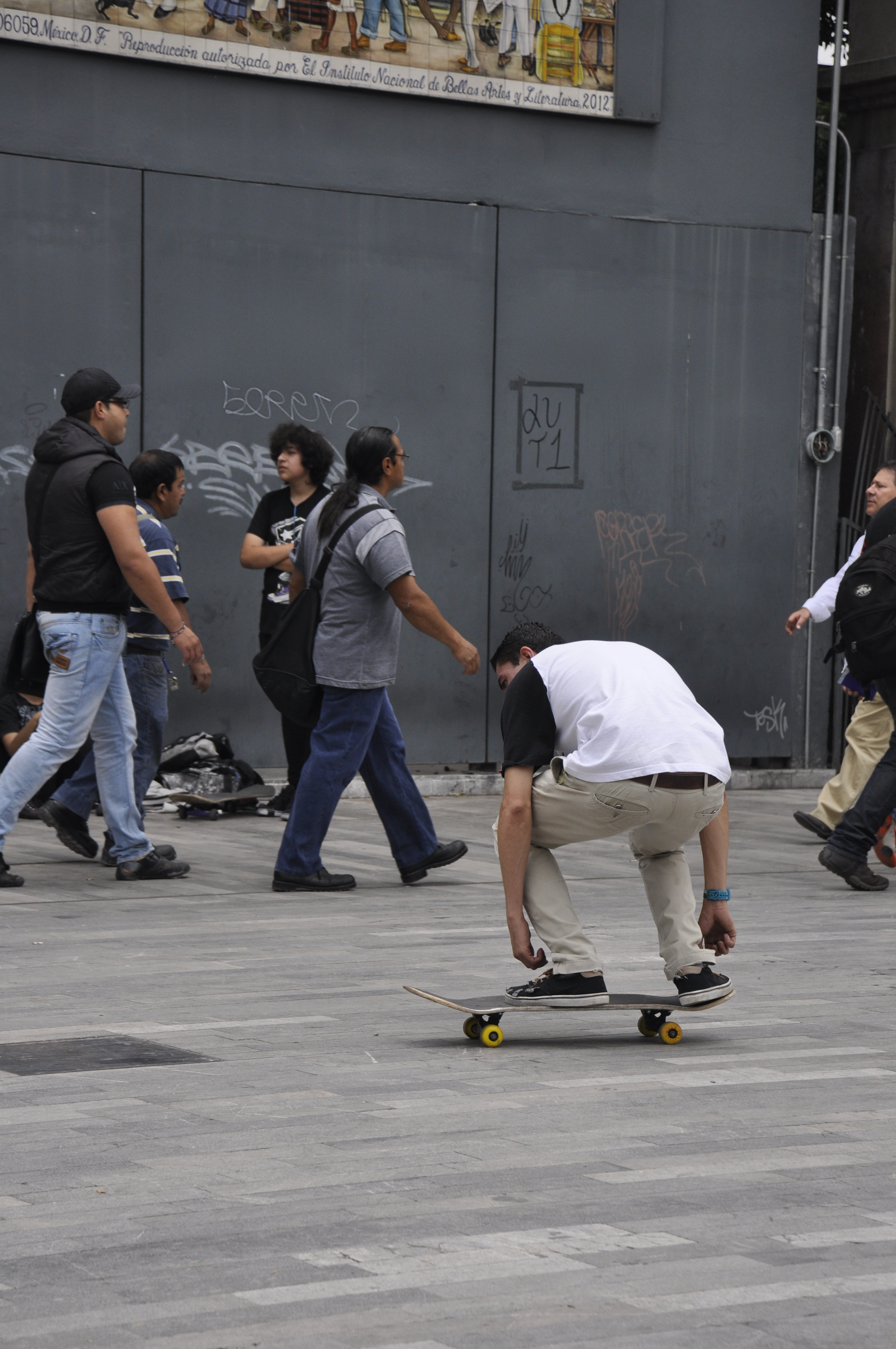
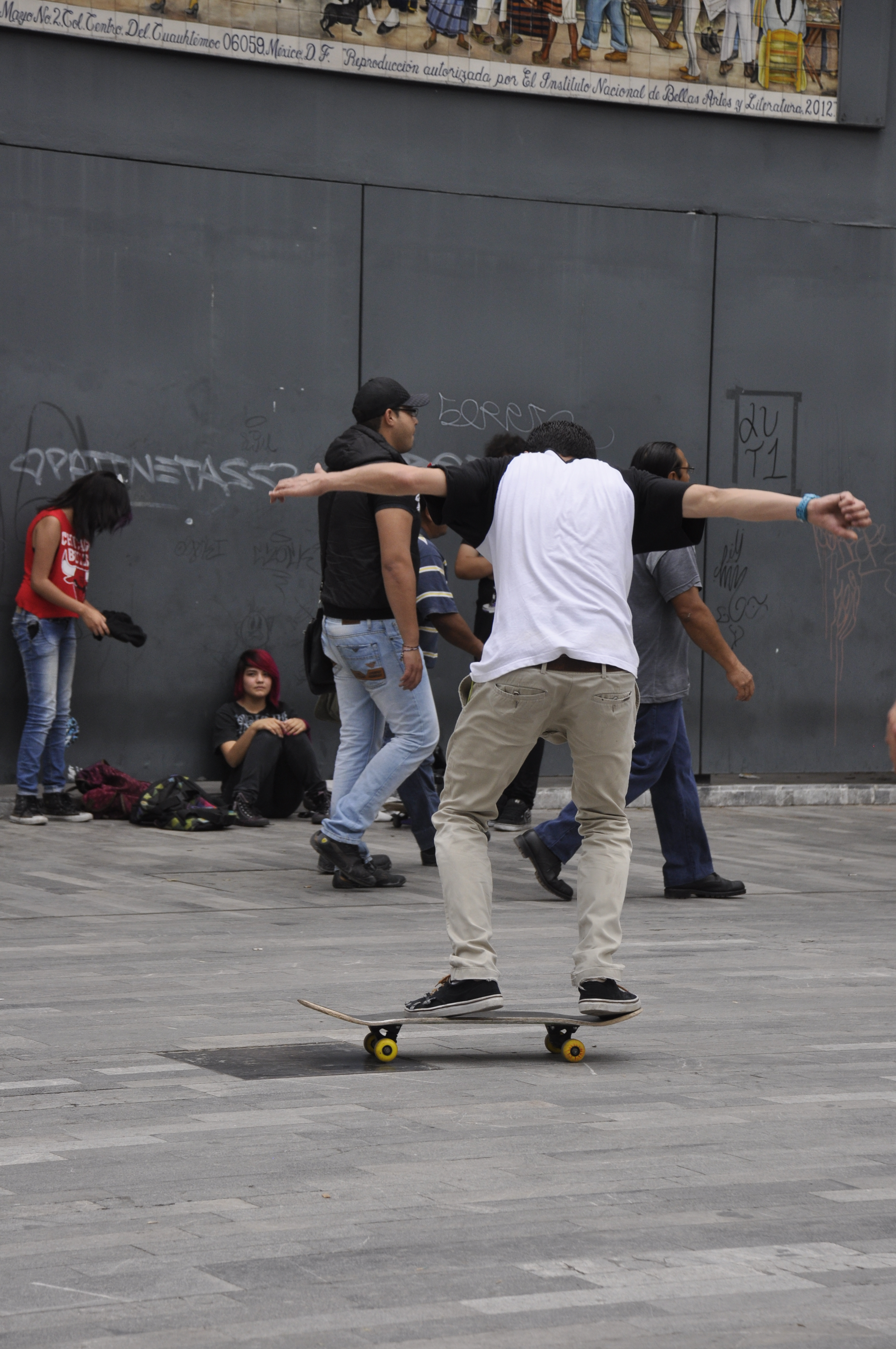
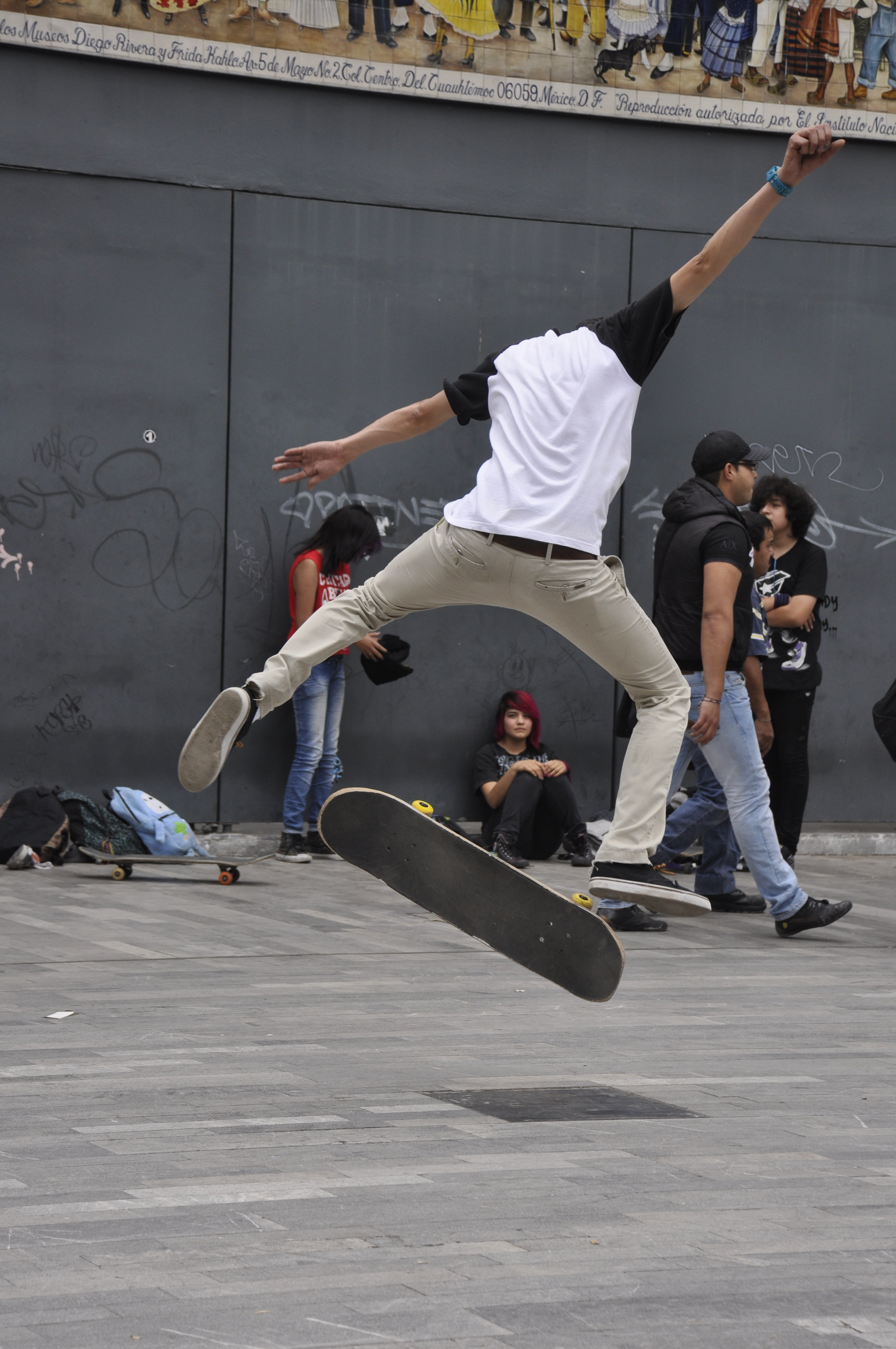
Backside 180 kickflip. Alameda Central, Mexico City, 2015.

=== Frontside/Backside heelflip ===
A heelflip combined with a frontside or backside 180-degree movement—the trick is also known as a frontside or backside "heel". Song is filmed performing a frontside heelflip on a transitional structure located on the back of a truck in a web-based video entitled "DVS Daewon x Almost Love Child".

=== Late kickflip ===
A late flip is a kickflip executed in a secondary motion, using your front or back foot, after or at the peak of an ollie—this is different from the one fluid motion that is involved with the execution of an ollie. Professional skateboarder Mike Mo Capaldi used a late flip variation in his heat against Shane O'Neill in the "Battle at the Berrics V" competition.

=== Ollie impossible ===
An "ollie impossible" involves the vertical 360-degree rotation of the board around the skater's back or front foot—the board rolls around the foot similar to the spinning of a baton around one's hand. A proficient ollie impossible is executed when the rotation of the board is as vertical as possible, whereby the board wraps around the foot. When the trick is executed with the front foot, the trick is named a "front-foot impossible". In a "trick tip" video presented by professional skateboarder Lee Yankou, the trick is described as a "scooping motion", rather than a trick that is launched with the execution of an ollie.

The trick was invented by Mullen in 1982, who shared the idea of this trick with some of his older friends who believed the board rotation of the trick to be "impossible", hence the name. In the 21st century, professional skateboarder Dylan Rieder accomplishes the trick over a New York (U.S.) park bench in a video segment for the Gravis footwear company. Professional skateboarder David Gonzales performed the trick for the "Trickipedia" section of The Berrics website.

=== Ollie Imposter/Mo flip/Manhatan flip ===
This flip trick variation involves the execution of a back-foot ollie impossible (the board wrapping 360 degrees around your back foot), followed by a flipping of the board, also with the back foot, as part of the same motion. The trick is also called the "Mo flip" because it was popularized by professional skateboarder Mike Mo Capaldi. The original name is "Manhatan flip" by MajadaCLN, a no professional skateboarder

=== Front-foot impossible bigger spin/Merlin twist ===
Professional skateboarder Chris Haslam was filmed performing this trick in slow motion and the footage was published on the Internet-based RIDE Channel. Haslam performs the trick while adopting his natural stance (goofy), but when the trick is performed "switch" it is called a "Merlin twist."

=== Varial kickflip ===
A varial kickflip (also known as a kickflip shuvit or 180 flip) is a kickflip combined with a backside-pop shuvit. The trick featured prominently in the Blueprint video The First Broadcast and the trick has received a significant amount of criticism from within the skateboard community; former Blueprint rider Mark Baines has stated in an online interview:

The shuv-it flip thing is weird. I don't think there are many tricks that look bad all the time. Gino can do heelflips and make them look like the best trick ever. It's how it's done not what it is. I wouldn't say my shuv-it flips were that good though. The fakie varial flip in First Broadcast is the best thing I ever filmed though. People basically hear or read something on a forum then feel they gotta hate it I suppose. I don't really know. Like I say a lot of the time with tricks it's how it's done.

=== Varial heelflip ===
A "varial heelflip" (originally known as a "heelflip shuvit") is a heelflip combined with a frontside pop shuvit. Professional skateboarders Chico Brenes and Moose (the latter filmed the high-definition (HD) version) filmed the trick for the "Trickipedia" section of The Berrics website. The official name of the trick in the 21st century was a point of contention among skateboarders; the issue was discussed on The Berrics website in early March 2013 in a short video segment entitled "Name Game" and the "varial heelflip" title emerged as the favored name.

=== 360 Varial Kickflip/360 flip/Tre flip ===
A combination of a 360-degree backside-pop shuvit and a kickflip. Also known as a tre flip. Professional skateboarders such as Josh Kalis, Capaldi, Ethan Fowler, Jason Lee, and Stefan Janoski have been recognized for their 360 flips. The trick was invented by Mullen in 1983.

An extra rotation can also be added, known as a "360 double flip", and Capaldi, O'Neill, and Song have been filmed executing the trick; O'Neill was also filmed executing the trick in switch stance as part of Battle at the Berrics 6. Footage of professional skateboarder Chris Cole, executing a 360 triple flip, was released on the internet in 2010.

=== Fakie bigspin heelflip/Rick flip/Howard heel ===
A combination of a fakie laser flip (360 Heelflip) and a frontside half-cab. The invention of this trick has been credited to professional skateboarder Rick Howard; however, Howard has publicly stated that he does not appreciate the recognition, as he does not believe that he is the trick's inventor. Song has executed the trick numerous times during the period from 2011 to early 2013 (X Games Real Street, 5-Incher, 5-Incher B-Side Edit, "iFun" web clip, and "Who Is Daewon Song?"). Early in his career, Song also performed the trick on transition without the tail hitting the ground—as is usually the case in skateboarding—and the trick also appears in his World Industries Love Child video part.

=== Hardflip ===
A hardflip combines a frontside pop shuvit with a kickflip. This trick is awkward to execute, and the board sometimes appears to move vertically through the legs—the degree of verticality is determined by the front-foot action. The first hardflip to be captured on film was in the World Industries Love Child video and was executed by Daewon Song—Song stated in an online interview:

The worst hardflip ever documented? It was the first, but it was the worst, so it's cool. So it's like first and worst. Back then, too, I didn't even know what it was. [Be]cause all I know is that I had to mule-kick the f*** out of my front...back foot, move it out of the way, and if you shot a photo, there would definitely be three frames of something that just did not look right.

Professional skateboarders such as Stevie Williams (executed a hardflip to nosegrind at Love Park in Philadelphia, U.S.), Gino Ianucci, Chet Thomas, and Kris Markovic have been recognized for their hardflips. In the Almost 5-Incher video, Lewis Marnell performs a hardflip to 5-0 grind. Sponsored skateboarder Brandon Turner executed a switch hardflip down the famous Carlsbad Gap (no longer in existence) in California, US.

Double hardflips have also been executed and Jake McAtee was filmed in 2009 performing the variation on a "hip" structure located at a skate park. Pro skater Sean Malto and Donovan Strain both performed double hardflips in an unsanctioned battle for Battle of the Berrics X in 2017.

=== 360 hardflip/ Mainecoon Flip ===
A 360 frontside pop shuvit combined with a kickflip. Professional skateboarder Jimmy Carlin was filmed executing a 360 hardflip down a set of stairs in the video Capital Motion. American skateboarder Robbyn Spangler-Magby (amateur) has also been filmed executing the trick—at 1,000 frames per second with a Redlake N3 high speed camera—for the Skateology web-based video series.

The 360 Hard-Flip was first documented in the 2005 video Synopsis it was performed by Al Garcia and was executed over a hip. The video featured top skaters Gershon Mosley, Aaron Snyder, and Dan Pageau. Synopsis marks the first video that both Mike Mo and Nick Merlino made their first appearance in.

=== Ghetto bird ===
A nollie hardflip late backside 180 (often mistakenly thought of as a hardflip late backside 180), this trick was popularized by Kareem Campbell with his only performance of it on transition in Issue 30 of 411 Video Magazine covering September–October 1998.

=== Diamond flip ===
A hardflip with backside 360-degree body rotation—the trick has been credited to Spangler-Magby.

=== Laser flip / 360 Heel ===
A flip trick in which a frontside 360 shuvit is combined with a heelflip (also known as frontside 360 shove-it heel flips)—the trick was invented by Mullen. Professional skateboarder Torey Pudwill has been recognized for his laser flips and he performed the trick for the "Trickipedia" section of The Berrics website. Double laser flips have also been performed.

=== Inward heelflip ===
A backside-pop shuvit (180 degree) combined with a heelflip. Flow skateboarder James Espinoza was filmed performing a fakie variation on The Berrics website.

=== Nollie inward heelflip ===
An inward heelflip executed at the front of the board in the nollie position. Professional skateboarder Bryan Herman performs the trick in a promotional video clip for his signature model shoe the Emerica "G6", and professional skateboarder Chris Cole was filmed executing a nollie inward heelflip in the Egypt skatepark, at the Woodward facility, in 2010. Professional skateboarder Lenny Rivas filmed a "Trick Tip" for CCS TV (Internet video channel for the CCS online retail outlet) in December 2012.

=== 360 Inward Heelflip ===
A backside 360 shuvit combined with a heelflip.

=== Inward double heelflip ===
An inward heelflip with two heelflip rotations. Unsponsored skateboarder Carell Harvey was filmed, with a Redlake N3 high-speed camera at 1,000 frames per second, performing the variation in 2011.

=== 360 inward double heelflip ===
A 360 inward double is a 360 inward heelflip with two heelflip rotations.

=== Backside bigspin ===
A backside bigspin is a Bs 360 Pop Shuvit with a Bs 180 body varial.

=== Bigflip / Backside Bigspin Kickflip ===
A Bigflip is just a Bigspin with a Kickflip. Following the definition of Bigspin, a Bigflip is a Varial Kickflip (Bs 180 Pop Shuvit Kickflip) with a Bs 180. Or 360 flip with BS 180

=== Backside bigspin heelflip/Bigspin inward heelflip/Big Inward Heel ===
A bigspin inward heel is a 360-degree inward heelflip with a 180-degree body rotation in the same direction. It is believed that pro-skater Tom Stano created this trick in an early 1980s skating video.

=== 360-degree kickflip/heelflip ===
The skateboarder's body spins 360 degrees in the same direction as the board during a kickflip. Professional skateboarder Paul Rodriguez finished in second place in "The Battle of the Berrics 2" (contest) to Cole, as he was unable to execute the 360-degree kickflip.

=== Bigger flip ===
A 540-degree flip with a 180-degree body rotation (when a 360-degree body rotation is executed, the trick is known as a "Gazelle flip/360 Bigspin").

=== Biggest flip ===
A 720 flip with a 180-degree backside rotation of the body (when the board spins 720 degrees, does one flip and your body does a 180 degree rotation the same way your board does). Invented and landed by Sewa Kroetkov and filmed by Chris Chann.

=== Bigspin heelflip/Big heel ===
A Laser flip combined with a frontside 180-degree body rotation in the same direction. Amateur skateboarder Felipe Gustavo performs a switch version for the "Trickipedia" section of The Berrics website.

=== Grape flip ===
A hardflip with a frontside 360-degree body rotation. The double grape flip consists of two hardflips and the 360-degree body rotation—the double variation was invented by Donovan Strain.

=== Disco flip ===
A heelflip backside 180 body varial. Performed like a normal heelflip, but the skater's shoulders are turned backside 90 degrees and the skateboard is caught halfway through.

=== Underflip ===
Flipping the board by using one foot that is under the board and flipping it in the kickflip or heelflip direction—this trick was invented by Mullen in 1992. While skateboarding on the Hollywood Walk of Fame, Mullen performs numerous variations of this flip trick in his Almost: Round Three video part.

=== Pop shuvit underflip ===
A shuv-it, with a late underflip performed by the back foot. While professional skateboarders rarely perform this trick, numerous segments of home video footage, in which unsponsored skateboarders perform the trick, has been published on the Internet.

=== Casper flip (flatground) ===
The rider uses the same pressure that would be applied if he/she is attempting to adopt a "primo" position (when the board is positioned on its side/edge); however, one foot is placed under the board so that the board is not completely in a "dark" position (when the board is upside down, with the griptape facing the ground). The other foot is then placed on the tail of the board when the board is upside down—the foot beneath the board is then used to scoop the board up, and then around. The rider then jumps onto the board to land in the starting position. Mullen invented the Casper 360 flip in 1983.

=== Dark casper flip (flatground) ===
A flatground trick performed without touching the floor. Starting in a normal stance, the rider uses backfoot pressure to flip the board into the "dark" position, standing on the underside of the board's tail and nose with either foot. Then, in one swift movement, the skateboarder applies pressure to the side of the board, with either foot lifting up onto the opposite side of the board. The skateboarder then uses the other foot to scoop the board over and around, while jumping to land back on the right side of the board.

=== Nollie casper flip ===
A nollie casper flip is a half-nollie flip that is caught upside down, with the front foot under the front trucks; the board is then flipped back over, heelflip-style, with a combined pop shuvit action.

=== Casper heel/Hospital heel/Scissor flip/Flower Flip ===
This flip trick is a half-heelflip—the front foot catches the board upside down—combined with a backside shuvit.

=== Twisted flip ===
A kickflip or heelflip shuvit with a 180-degree body rotation in the opposite direction to the rotation of the board.

=== Nightmare flip/Double kickflip shove-it ===
A nightmare flip is a varial kickflip with an extra kickflip rotation. Also known as varial double kickflip

=== Hospital flip ===
A Hospital flip consists of two separate motions: firstly, the skateboarder performs a kickflip but stalls the rotation of the board at the halfway point; the front foot then executes an upward flick that causes the board to spin 180 degrees along the longitudinal axis.

=== Alpha flip ===
Footage of an alpha flip is provided in a YouTube tutorial by Cotton Mouth Skateboards that features a skateboarder combining a backside 180 with a 360-degree hospital flip of the board around the front foot. The tutorial states: "The front foot never leaves the board(Its easier this way. However, it is a hospital flip, not an impossible, so it may)."

=== Beta flip ===
Footage of both a regular beta flip and fakie beta flip were published on the Cotton Mouth Skateboards YouTube channel in 2012 and 2010, respectively. In the 2010 video clip, the skateboarder describes a fakie beta flip as, "a fakie backside 360 while you do an alpha flip"; thus, a beta flip can be described as a backside 360 with a 360-degree rotation of the board around the front foot.

=== Trigger Flip ===
A vertical half front foot impossible, cancelled with a late underflip. This can be achieved by doing a hospital flip type motion while flipping the board forward to the inside of the front leg instead of the outside. The board will fling forward through the legs fast like a trigger. First coined by Ryan Anthony Johnson in 2021.

=== Backside Trigger Flip ===
A vertical half front foot impossible late underflip backside 180. First landed flatground in 2023, and on a hip in august 2025 by Ryan Anthony Johnson.

=== Dolphin flip/Murder flip/Forward flip/Horse flip ===
Performed by pushing with the front foot directly off the nose of the board after an ollie, causing the board to rotate almost vertically 180 degrees towards the frontfoot between the rider's legs while flipping the board 180 degrees so it lands wheels down. Carlin has described the trick as "Pretty much a varial flip that goes down." The trick was invented by Darrell Stanton.

- Late dolphin flip – a dolphin flip in which the front foot starts the 180° vertical rotation 0.2–0.4 s after the pop, with the foot already off the board, so the board orbits the foot as in an impossible. Unlike the trigger flip, the rotation is not cancelled by a late underflip.
- Late dolphin heelflip – the same with the longitudinal rotation to the heel side.

=== 360 Dolphin/Dragon flip/360 Forward flip/Reda flip ===
A dolphin/forward flip with a 360-degree rotation. Chris Chann performed this trick for his YouTube series "Trick Challenge" (episode 11) in April 2014. He got the idea for the name from the anime television series Dragon Ball Z, which he had been watching the night before filming. However, this trick had already been executed before Chris Chann's attempt, as can be seen in a video by Moroccan skateboarder Reda Hadada, uploaded days before Chann's own attempts.

=== Dolphin heel/Porpoise flip/Forward heelflip ===
A forward flip combined with a heelflip.

=== Inward flip ===
For an inward flip, the board rotates in the same manner as an "inward heelflip", but the board is flipped from under the board with the front foot. This trick is easiest in the nollie position and is considered the complete opposite of a "nerdflip". Due to the awkward foot positioning required for an inward flip, the flip trick is typically performed by advanced skateboarders. The trick was invented by Mullen.

=== Gazelle flip/ 360 Bigspin Kickflip ===
A flip trick in which a 540-degree board flip is combined with a 360-degree body rotation in the same direction. So basically a big flip (big spin with kickflip) then immediately after landing 180 pivot. The trick was invented by Mullen in 1981.

=== Kickflip Underflip ===
This trick is performed like a kickflip, but after the board has made the full kickflip rotation, the front foot flips the board back in the opposite direction like a heelflip from the underside of the board. It is essentially a kickflip with a late front foot underflip.

=== Semi-flip ===
A quarter-kickflip, late back-foot varial heelflip that was invented by Mullen.

=== Storm flip ===
A nollie backside flip followed by a late kickflip—the trick was invented by Jerry Hsu and was captured in the Osiris shoe company video The Storm. Hsu was filmed performing the trick on transition during the 2009 Zumiez Couch Tour.

=== Sigma flip ===
A one and a half varial kick-flip (almost a nightmare flip) that transitions into an anti-Casper flip in a single motion.

=== Haslam flip ===
A half kick flip shuv-it that transitions into a half late heel flip in a single motion—the trick is named after its inventor, professional skateboarder Chris Haslam.

=== Hectop flip ===
Invented by Haslam, the name of the trick is taken from the Russian (Cyrillic) version of the name of fellow professional skateboarder Nestor Judkins (sponsored by Enjoi skateboards, Krux trucks, RVCA clothing, and adidas footwear). The trick is a switch, half frontside flip to back foot bigspin flip. In his online introduction of the truck for sponsor, Strange Notes (Independent Trucks), Haslam explained:

"Hectop Flip—that's Nestor's name in Russian. Took me forever to land it, so, I think it's annoying too. Basically, it was like a switch, half frontside flip, and then backfoot bigspin flip, back to forward again. When your back foot doesn't flip the board properly, you feel like a complete moron; or I do. You feel like you just started skating, and, ah, just coming off an injury, that's the last thing you need. Make sure you kick it every time, so that everybody will think you're sweet. You can get on video and go on Strange Notes. Peace out."

=== Unnamed Haslam flip trick ===
Haslam also invented a switch flip trick that, as of 2012, had not been named. The trick was filmed for the Strange Notes company under the title, "Chris Haslam Crazy Ass trick".

=== Hang ten flip/Gingersnap ===
The rider is in a "hang ten" position and then pops the board down, resulting in a pressure nollie hardflip through the rider's legs.

=== Handstand flip ===
This flip trick can be executed while rolling along or in a stationary position. The skateboarder can either start on the board or on the ground (if the board is rolling, the skateboarder usually hops off the board first). The skateboarder places his/her hands on the board and then quickly pulls the board's edge up, causing it to flip, and then the skater lands on the board with both feet.

=== Rail flip ===
For a rail flip, the skateboarder stands on the side of the board and uses the back foot to flip the board with pressure.

=== Railstand nightmare flip ===
A Railstand nightmare flip is a double-kick flip shuvit executed from a "primo" position.

=== Frightmare flip/Twisted nightmare flip ===
A Frightmare flip is a nightmare flip with a frontside 180-degree body rotation.

=== No comply flips ===
A "no comply" is a trick where the skater plants his/her foot, and then uses the back foot and knee to lift the board off the ground. It is a freestyle trick that can be combined with pressure flips, finger flips, and spins. In 2011, a no comply frontside bigspin heelflip was filmed by the Skateology web-based video series.

Haslam performed a "Switch No Comply Frontside 360 Heelflip" in May 2013 for the Ride Channel's "Skateboarding in Slow Motion" segment.

=== No-comply pressure flip ===
A trick whereby the front foot is planted on the ground and a pressure flip is then performed in one motion. This flip trick usually involves running and catching the board with front foot.

=== Tucker flip/Bigspin flip 180 ===
A bigspin kickflip, whereby the skateboarder's body transitions into a fakie backside 180 after the bigspin kickflip has completed its rotation.

=== Illusion flip/Muska flip ===
A flip trick in which the board flips in a similar fashion to a frontside kickflip, but the action of the front foot is absent—the flip of the board is reliant upon the pushing down action of the back foot. Aaron "Jaws" Homoki has filmed a "Trick Tip" video for the RIDE Channel on YouTube, in which he commends professional skateboarder Chad Muska for his execution of the trick. Muska has received broader recognition for his execution of the trick and it is, therefore, also called a "Muska flip".

=== Psycho white boy ===
A late back-foot varial/shuvit flip—the name of the trick was coined by Jimmy Carlin; however, it is unclear who invented the trick.

== Pressure flips ==
=== Pressure flip ===
Is basically an inward heelflip without the heelflip as it is executed only by the same foot used to pop it up whether on the nose or tail—pressure flips are executed using a scooping technique, rather than the "popping" action of ollie-based tricks. In an instructional video, Hawk described the action that underpins the trick as a "pushing/scooping action, instead of an ollie" and states that the trick is "old school", forgotten by later generations of skateboarders. American skateboard shop owner and former professional skateboarder Nate Sherwood is well known for a variety of pressure flip tricks, and Sherwood invented the "Laser pressure flip".

=== 360 pressure flip ===
A pressure kickflip that rotates 360 degrees .

=== Toe flip ===
Flipping the board with the pressure of the toes on the heel-side of the board near the tail, directly above the back wheel. The back foot is pulled back and forward, causing the board to rotate and flip in what is essentially a backside varial flip.

=== 360 toe flip ===
A pressure 360 flip, flipped with the toe of the back foot.

=== Ollie late pressure flip ===
The trick became the second flip trick to be named the "Mo flip", as it is a highlight of Capaldi's opening part in Lakai's Fully Flared video, as well as during his finals match against Shane O'neill in the "Battle Of The Berrics 5" contest. The trick is later performed against Nyjah Huston in "Battle At The Berrics 7" in April 2014.

=== Bubble Flip ===
A pressure backfoot hospital flip. It is performed by rolling the board a quarter turn towards the skater with their backfoot, then kicking it back to create a varial heelflip type motion.

== Execution ==
Flip tricks can be executed by 'popping' the boards nose or tail, or by using the foot to lift the board up from underneath (underflip). Basic flip tricks are performed by popping the board with one foot, and using the other foot to flip the raised end. Less common flip variations can be achieved popping the board in an unusual way, where the pop itself makes the board flip. These include pressure flips and toe flips that were more popular in early skateboarding. Flip tricks are usually performed while the skateboarder is rolling, although they may be performed while stationary.
