= Alley-oop (skateboarding) =

Skateboarding technique

An Alley-oop on transition (Halfpipes or quarterpipes) is a description for the way a trick is executed in the case when the trick is rotating in the opposite direction of the rider’s approach. Meaning when approaching the ramp coping backside, the trick is turning frontside and vice versa.

It is not known who invented the alley-oop, but nevertheless this trick played a pivotal role in skateboarding's transition from a niche hobby to a mainstream sport.

== See also ==
- Skateboarding trick
