= Alan Gelfand =

American skateboarder, racing driver, and entrepreneur (born January 1, 1963)

Alan "Ollie" Gelfand
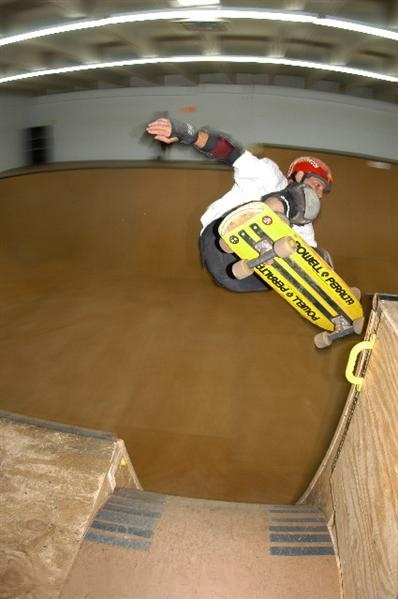
- Born: January 1, 1963 (age 63); New York City, New York, U.S.
- Other name: Ollie
- Occupations: Skateboarder, Entrepreneur, Racing Driver
- Known for: Inventing the "ollie" the foundational skateboarding trick

Alan "Ollie" Gelfand (born January 1, 1963) is an influential American skateboarder, racing driver, and entrepreneur credited with inventing the ollie, the foundational skateboarding trick.

== Early life ==
Alan Gelfand was born in New York City, and is Jewish. Gelfand moved to Hollywood, Florida with his family in 1972. He started skateboarding in 1974 after his father bought him his first skateboard.

== Skateboarding career ==
Alan Gelfand
Sport
- Country: United States
- Sport: Skateboarding
- Event: Vert skating
- Team: Powell Peralta
- Turned pro: 1978

=== Invention of the ollie ===
Named by Thrasher Magazine as "The Founding Father of A Generation", Alan Gelfand's invention of the ollie changed the face of skateboarding. His initial performance of the trick in 1976 at Skateboard USA in Hollywood, Florida, was serendipitous, stemming from the imperfect construction of the skatepark itself. Gelfand explained that the park's poorly constructed features inadvertently led to his groundbreaking discovery. "It was all by accident. The park was built so poorly that many of the features were over vertical and uneven. There was a part of the pool run where, when you skated it, you went out, caught air, and because it was over vertical, the board would pitch back towards your legs. You'd bend your knees back in and the board would come back to you. It was all by accident, really," Gelfand recalled. He began applying this technique to various elements, further refining his approach. By 1979, during a visit to Winchester Skate Park in San Jose, he was perfecting the ollie, leading to it becoming a fundamental move in skateboarding.

This unintentional innovation, dubbed the "trick of the century" by Stacy Peralta, fundamentally changed skateboarding, transforming it from simple maneuvers to complex aerial dynamics. Gelfand was credited in the Oxford Dictionary of English, the Encyclopædia Britannica, and the Webster's Dictionary as being the inventor of the trick after it had previously been listed as unknown.

The trick involves a skateboarder snapping the tail of the board down while jumping to lift the board into the air without the use of hands.

Gelfand's technique was first showcased in a detailed how-to feature in the January 1979 issue of SkateBoarder Magazine. Titled "Special Tips on Progressive Aerials," the article described his method for executing the no-hand ollie air, providing a step-by-step guide that has influenced generations of skateboarders.

=== Professional achievements and contributions ===
Gelfand's skateboarding prowess extended beyond the invention of the ollie. He competed in various significant events in the 1970s and 1980s, showcasing his skills across multiple countries on tour as the first member of the legendary Bones Brigade team put together by Stacy Peralta. The Bones Brigade was an elite team of skateboarders sponsored by Powell-Peralta, which included other legendary skateboarders like Tony Hawk and Rodney Mullen, and was instrumental in the evolution and popularization of skateboarding. Their collective innovation and media exposure played a significant role in skateboarding's transition from a niche hobby to a global phenomenon.

Gelfand's competitive spirit was evident as he participated in and won numerous skateboarding contests globally. His tour and competition schedule in the late 1970s included events across Europe and South America, where he showcased the ollie and other complex maneuvers, further popularizing skateboarding as a sport.

Gelfand was entered into the Skateboarding Hall of Fame in 2013.

=== Competitions entered, touring and cultural impact ===
Throughout his career, Gelfand participated in numerous notable skateboarding competitions.

1970s

- 1976 South Florida Skateboard Championships, Hollywood, Florida: An early competition that highlighted Gelfand's emerging talent.
- 1976 First Annual Central Florida Skateboard Championships, Skateboard City, Port Orange, Florida: Showcased his prowess in slalom and freestyle skateboarding.
- 1977 Florida Pro, Kona Skatepark, Jacksonville, Florida: Gelfand competed against top regional skateboarders.
- 1978 First Annual Fun ’N Sun Skateboard Championships, Clearwater, Florida: Participated in cross country, giant slalom, and dual slalom.
- 1978 Catalina Classic, Avalon, Santa Catalina, California: Competed in downhill and dual slalom events.

1980s

- 1980 Big O Pro-Am, Big O, Orange, California: Known for winning the 'Highest Air' category, showcasing his ollie skills.
- 1980 Gold Cup Series, various locations in California: Participated in a series of events, excelling in bowl and freestyle skating.

Special exhibitions and demonstrations

- 1979 SkateBoarder Magazine Exhibition: Featured in a special demonstration that solidified his status within the skateboarding community.
- 1980s Bones Brigade Tours: As a key member of the Bones Brigade, Gelfand participated in national and international tours, performing in exhibitions that popularized skateboarding globally.

During his tours, Gelfand's style and technical skills left an indelible mark on the international skateboarding scene. He participated in significant events such as the Super Skate Show in Caracas, Venezuela, in 1979, which featured prominent skaters of the time and was a key venue for Gelfand to demonstrate the ollie to a wider audience. Rodney Mullen reported in skateboarding.com that event was the first time he and Gelfand performed the Pop Shove It trick.

== Racing career ==
Alan "Ollie" Gelfand
- Nationality: American
- Born: January 1, 1963 (age 63) New York City, New York, U.S.
- Wins: 4

Previous series
- Grand-Am Cup Street Stock Series, IMSA Firestone Firehawk Series, Longest Day of Nelson 24 Hour Endurance Race

Championship titles
- 1990, 1991, 1992, 1993: Longest Day of Nelson 24 Hour Endurance Race

After retiring from professional skateboarding, Gelfand transitioned into car racing, particularly focusing on Volkswagens. His racing career spanned from the late 1980s through the early 2000s, where he participated in various endurance races and showcased his driving skills.

=== Racing success ===
Gelfand achieved notable success in the Longest Day of Nelson 24 Hour Endurance Race for Showroom Stock Cars, held at the Nelson Ledges Road Course. He secured first place in this race for four consecutive years from 1990 to 1993, demonstrating his prowess in endurance racing.

==== Grand-Am Cup Series ====
Gelfand competed in the Grand-Am Cup Street Stock Series in 2001, participating in multiple races across different circuits:

Daytona International Speedway: Third and eighth positions in two different races. Phoenix International Raceway: Fifth and twenty-first positions. Homestead-Miami Speedway: Seventh position. Watkins Glen International: Tenth position.

==== Other competitions ====
Gelfand also competed in various other endurance races:

1993 IMSA Firestone Firehawk race: Fourteenth position. 1993 3 Hour Firestone Firehawk Endurance Championship at Laguna Seca: Twenty-eighth position. 2001 Daytona Motorola Cup: Ninth position.

Year	Race	Class Position	Team	Car Make/Model	Class	Source
1990	Longest day of Nelson 24 Hour Endurance Race for Showroom Stock Cars	1	BSI Racing	1981 VW Rabbit	1 IT-B	Racing History Project
1991	Longest day of Nelson 24 Hour Endurance Race for Showroom Stock Cars	1	BSI Racing	1981 VW Rabbit	1 IT-B	Racing History Project
1992	Longest day of Nelson 24 Hour Endurance Race for Showroom Stock Cars	1	BSI Racing	1981 VW Rabbit	1 IT-B	Racing History Project
1993	Longest day of Nelson 24 Hour Endurance Race for Showroom Stock Cars	1	BSI Racing	1981 VW Rabbit	1 IT-B	Racing History Project
2001	Daytona International Speedway	3	Speedsource	Porsche Boxster	ST	The Third Turn
2001	Phoenix International Raceway	5	Speedsource	Porsche Boxster	ST	The Third Turn
2001	Homestead-Miami Speedway	7	Speedsource	Porsche Boxster	ST	The Third Turn
1992	Ace Auto Parts 250 Firestone Firehawk Endurance Championships Sebring International Raceway-Sebring, FL	8	N/A	N/A	N/A	
2001	Daytona International Speedway	8	Speedsource	Porsche Boxster	ST	The Third Turn
2001	Daytona Motorola Cup	9	N/A	N/A	N/A	Zoom Pics
2001	Watkins Glen International	10	Speedsource	Porsche Boxster	ST	The Third Turn
1993	IMSA Firestone Firehawk race	14	Team Schlesinger-Gelfand	Volkswagen Corrado	N/A	Ultimate Racing History
2001	Grand-Am Cup Street Stock Series at Phoenix International Raceway	21	Speedsource	Porsche Boxster	ST	Motorsport
1993	3 Hour Firestone Firehawk Endurance Championship for Grand Sports, Sports, and Touring entry list	28	Rally's Hamburgers	Volkswagen Corrado	Touring	Prog Covers

== Progression into automotive industry ==
German Car Depot
- Type: Private
- Industry: Automotive repair
- Founded: 1997
- Founder: Alan Gelfand
- Headquarters: Hollywood, Florida, United States
- Number of locations: 1
- Area served: Hollywood, Florida
- Services: Specializing in German automobiles
- Website: German Car Depot

Frequently working as a mechanic on the cars he raced, and those of his teammates, post-racing, Gelfand continued his involvement with automobiles by founding the German Car Depot in Hollywood, Florida. The business specializes in the repair and maintenance of German automobiles, reflecting his connection with automotive engineering and mechanics.

=== Automotive Business - German Car Depot ===
Gelfand opened the German Car Depot, an auto repair shop specializing in German automobiles, located in Hollywood, Florida. The shop, established after a rebranding from VW Depot due to a trademark dispute, now operates with eight bays and serves hundreds of cars monthly, generating multimillion-dollar revenues.

== Entry into the dictionary ==
Alan "Ollie" Gelfand's name and contribution to skateboarding were immortalized when the term "ollie," was added to the Oxford English Dictionary. This inclusion not only acknowledges his invention but cements his legacy within the English language as both a noun and an intransitive verb. This recognition highlights the widespread impact of his innovation on skateboarding and popular culture, illustrating how a sport's technical term can become embedded in everyday language. The Canadian Oxford Dictionary still lists the origin of the word as unknown, despite all other editions crediting Gelfand.

=== Legal battles and trademark issues ===
Gelfand has also been involved in legal actions to protect his intellectual property related to the ollie. He filed lawsuits against major companies, including Disney and Sega, for using the term "ollie" without permission, claiming infringement on his trademark rights.

== Filmography ==
Gelfand's significant contributions to skateboarding have also been recognized in several documentary films, which explore the cultural and historical aspects of the sport. His participation in these films helps preserve the legacy of skateboarding's evolution and his pivotal role within it.

=== Skateboard Madness (1980) ===
Gelfand appeared as a skateboarder in Skateboard Madness, a documentary that captures the vibrant skateboarding scene of the late 1970s. The film provides insight into the dynamics of skateboarding culture during a period of significant growth and innovation.

=== Bones Brigade: An Autobiography (2012) ===
In Bones Brigade: An Autobiography, directed by Stacy Peralta, Gelfand appears as himself. The documentary focuses on the history of the Bones Brigade, a legendary skateboarding team known for their influence on the sport in the 1980s. Gelfand's firsthand account contributes to the narrative of the team's pioneering impact on skateboarding.

=== Dogtown and Z-Boys (2001) ===
Gelfand also featured in Dogtown and Z-Boys, another documentary by Stacy Peralta. Originally filmed in the 1970s, but released officially in 2001, these two films examine the skate and surf culture of 1970s Venice, California, highlighting the innovations brought by the Zephyr Skateboard Team. Gelfand's involvement in the documentary underscores the revolutionary changes in skateboarding during this era, including his invention of the ollie which can be seen on video for the first time.

== See also ==
- List of select Jewish skateboarders
