= Ollie (skateboarding) =

Skateboarding trick

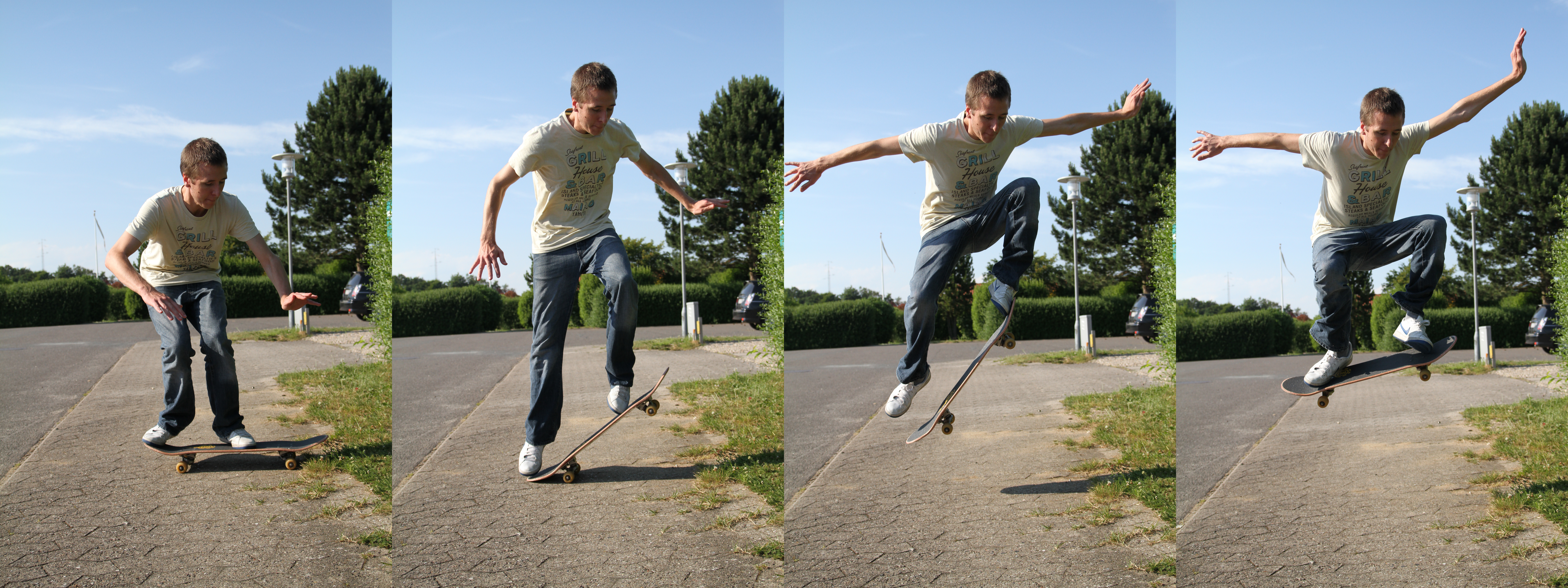
Modern ollie technique

The ollie is a skateboarding trick where the rider and board leap into the air without the use of the rider's hands. It is the combination of stomping (also known as popping) the tail of the skateboard off the ground to get the board mostly vertical, jumping, and sliding the front foot forward to level out the skateboard at the peak of the jump.

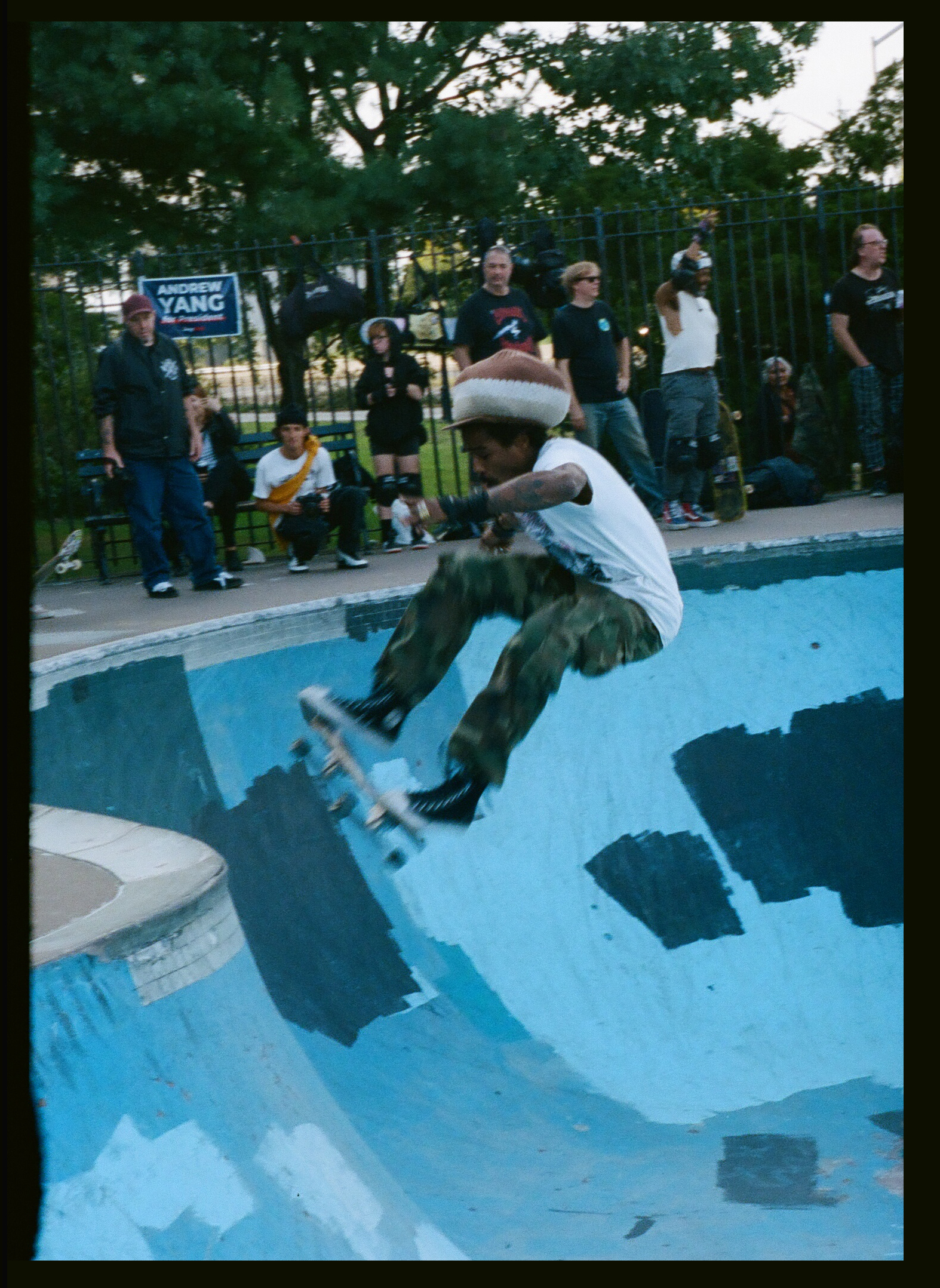
Julio Pineda with the bowl ollie at Owl's Head Skate Park – October 2019

The ollie is a fundamental skill in skateboarding. Ollies are necessary to leap onto, over, or off of obstacles. As most flip tricks depend on it, the ollie is often the first skill to be learned by a new skateboarder and typically takes considerable practice to master.

== Origin of the technique ==
In 1978 Alan Gelfand, who was given his nickname "Ollie" by Scott Goodman, learned to perform frontside no-handed aerials in bowls and pools using a gentle raising of the nose and scooping motion to keep the board with the feet. There are numerous references to Alan Gelfand's ollie, most notably pictures in the 1970s skateboarding magazine Skateboarder. Jeff Tatum is credited as the first person to perform a backside ollie in a bowl, which he initially named a "JT air". Both ollies were invented around the same time and it is unclear if the backside or frontside was done first, but Gelfand's frontside got the most initial media attention.

An April 1981 issue of the skateboarding magazine Thrasher notes the vert ollie was quickly adapted to flatground use, observing that "skaters now hop effortlessly from street to sidewalk with just a tap of the tail." In 1982, while competing in the Rusty Harris contest in Whittier, California, Rodney Mullen debuted an ollie on flat ground, which he had adapted from Gelfand's vertical version by combining the motions of some of his existing tricks. Mullen used a "see-saw" motion, striking the tail of the board on the ground to lift the nose, and using the front foot to level the board in mid-air. While Mullen was not initially impressed with his flat ground ollie, and did not formally name it, the trick is now considered to have transformed the practice of skateboarding. Mullen himself realized it opened up a second, elevated plane on which to perform tricks, stating that "Skating might easily have petered out due to lack of progress if nobody had invented this trick."

Mullen won the Rusty Harris contest and was asked afterwards by many riders to demonstrate the trick. Later in the year, it would appear with the name "Ollie-pop" as a "trick tip" in Thrasher.

The flat ground ollie technique is strongly associated with street skateboarding; mini ramp and vert riders can also use this technique to gain air and horizontal distance from the coping, but half-pipe riders typically rely more on the board's upward momentum to keep it with the rider, more similar to Gelfand's original technique.

== Execution of the flatground ollie ==
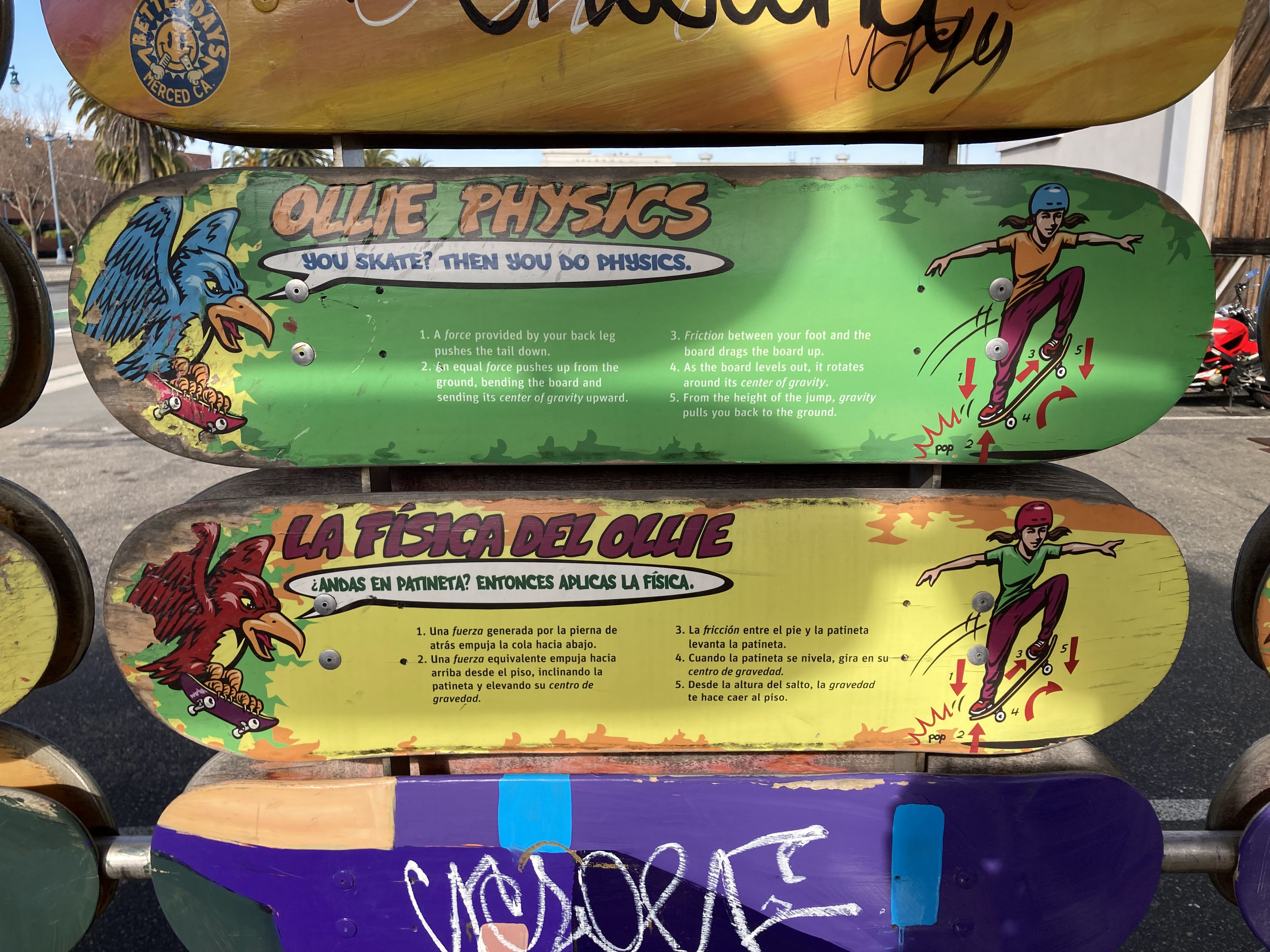
Public exhibit at the Exploratorium science museum in San Francisco explaining the physics of the ollie.

Video of several attempts to ollie over a rail

The rider begins the ollie by crouching and jumping directly upward. As the rider begins to leap, instead of lifting the feet from the board, they "pop" the tail by striking it against the ground while the rider jumps into the air, which raises the board nose-first. Maintaining contact with the board, the rider lifts the front leg and bends the front ankle so that the outer or top side of the shoe slides towards the nose of the board. The friction between the shoe and the board's grip tape helps to guide and pull the board upward, while the rear foot only maintains slight contact with the board to navigate it. When nearing the peak of the jump, the rider lifts the rear leg and pushes the front foot forward, which levels the board and keeps it in contact with the back foot.

The skater can gain greater clearance from the ground by jumping higher, popping faster, sliding the front foot more forwards (starting the jump with the front foot further back), and pulling the legs higher into the chest to raise the feet upwards. Skaters attempting record-setting ollies even contort the legs so that their board and feet are not directly below them, allowing the board to rise at or just below the level of the pelvis.

Very low ollies can be achieved using the same technique, but without the tail making contact with the ground. Even basic flip tricks can be achieved without the "pop" of the tail, such as a shove-it or big spin.

The principal components of an ollie are force and friction. The more energetically one pushes on the rear end of the skateboard, and the more friction generated by the foot sliding along the board, the higher the athlete will travel. Increasing the friction of the board's surface through the use of higher-grit deck tape would thus greatly improve performance, as would the development of the skill to more quickly and energetically slide one's foot along the board.

== Records ==
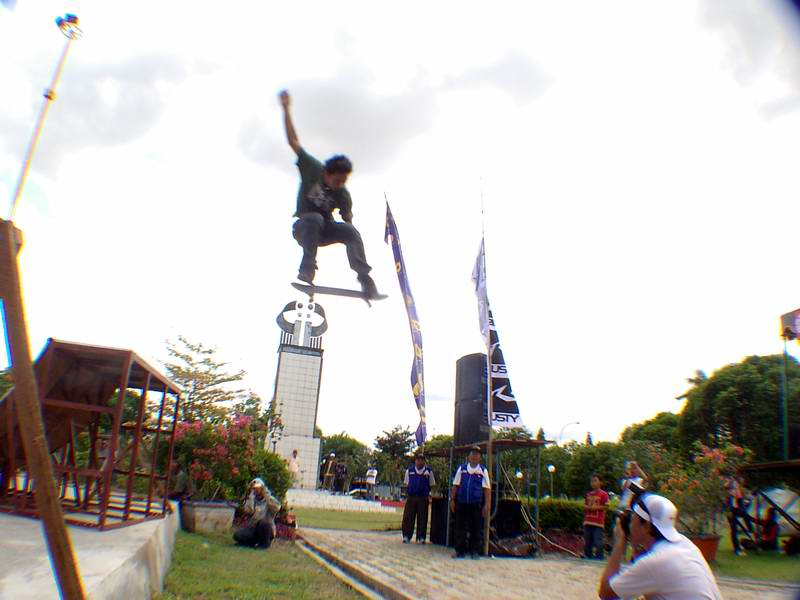
A skateboarder performing an ollie over a gap

The highest unofficial ollie was 46.1 inches (117.0 cm) performed by Jack Asani at Hyde park, Sydney, Australia on 4 June 2023 in a small event held by Integrity Skateboard company.

The highest official flat ground ollies are generally performed in ollie contests.

- The highest preferred stance ollie was 45.00 inches (114.3 cm) from the ground, performed by Aldrin Garcia.
- The highest switch stance ollie was 40.125 inches (101.92 cm), performed by Gavin Caperton.

The Guinness World Record for the greatest number of consecutive ollies is held by David Tavernor of Norwich, United Kingdom, who successfully performed 323 ollies on 23 August 2021. David beat the record despite being diagnosed with arthritis in 2015, winning a £5 bet with a professional comedian in doing so.

== Main variations ==
- Switch Ollie: an ollie performed in the stance opposite of a rider's normal stance.
- Fakie Ollie: an ollie done while riding backwards and in a rider's normal stance. Invented by Tony Montalvo.
- Nollie (short for "nose ollie"): an ollie executed by popping the nose of the board while the rider is in their normal stance and moving forward. The rider reverses the roles of the two legs so that the front foot pops the nose to the ground, and the rear foot lifts and guides the tail. It must never be described as a Switch Fakie Ollie because the switch and the fakie terms cancel each other out.
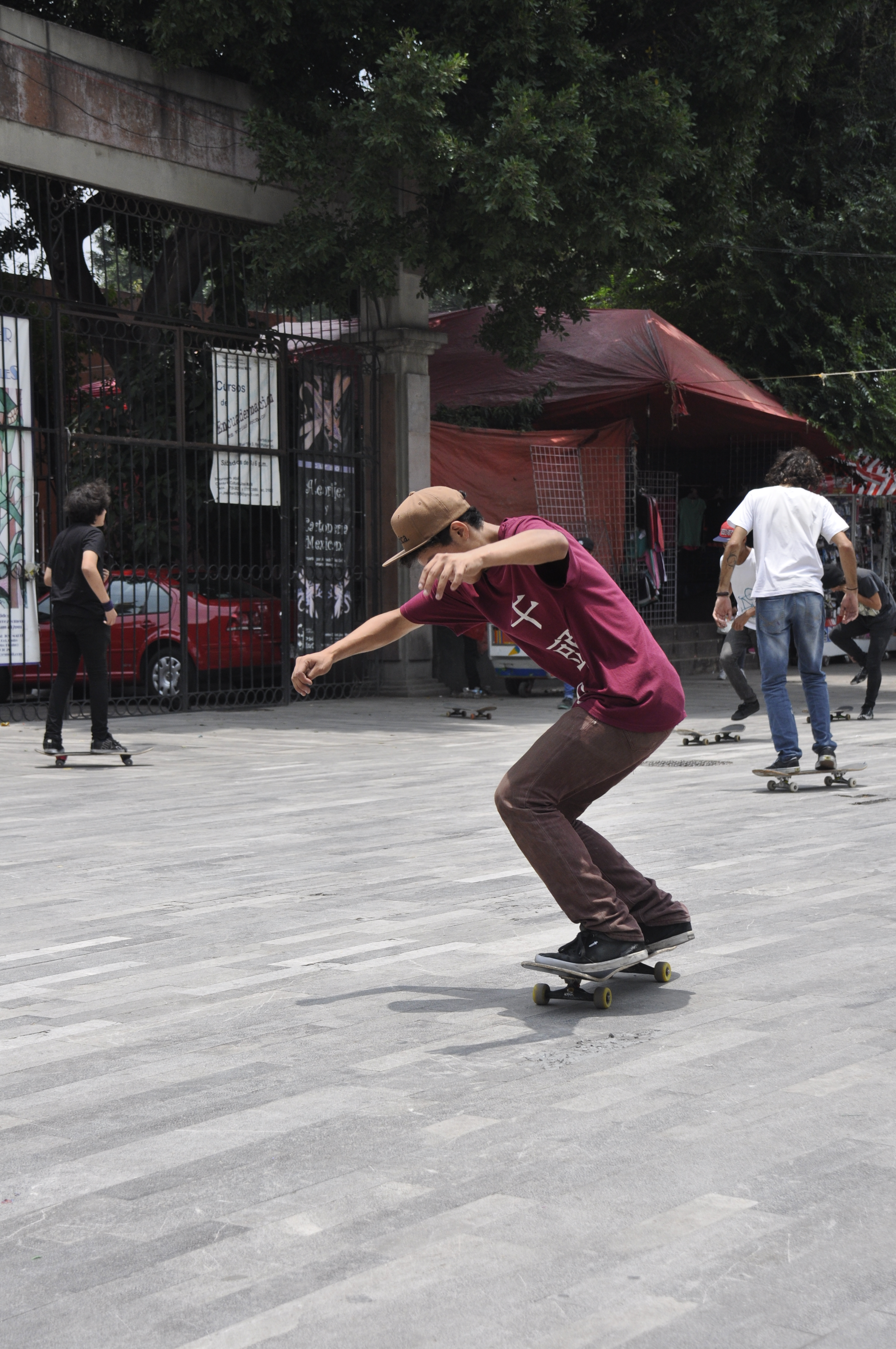
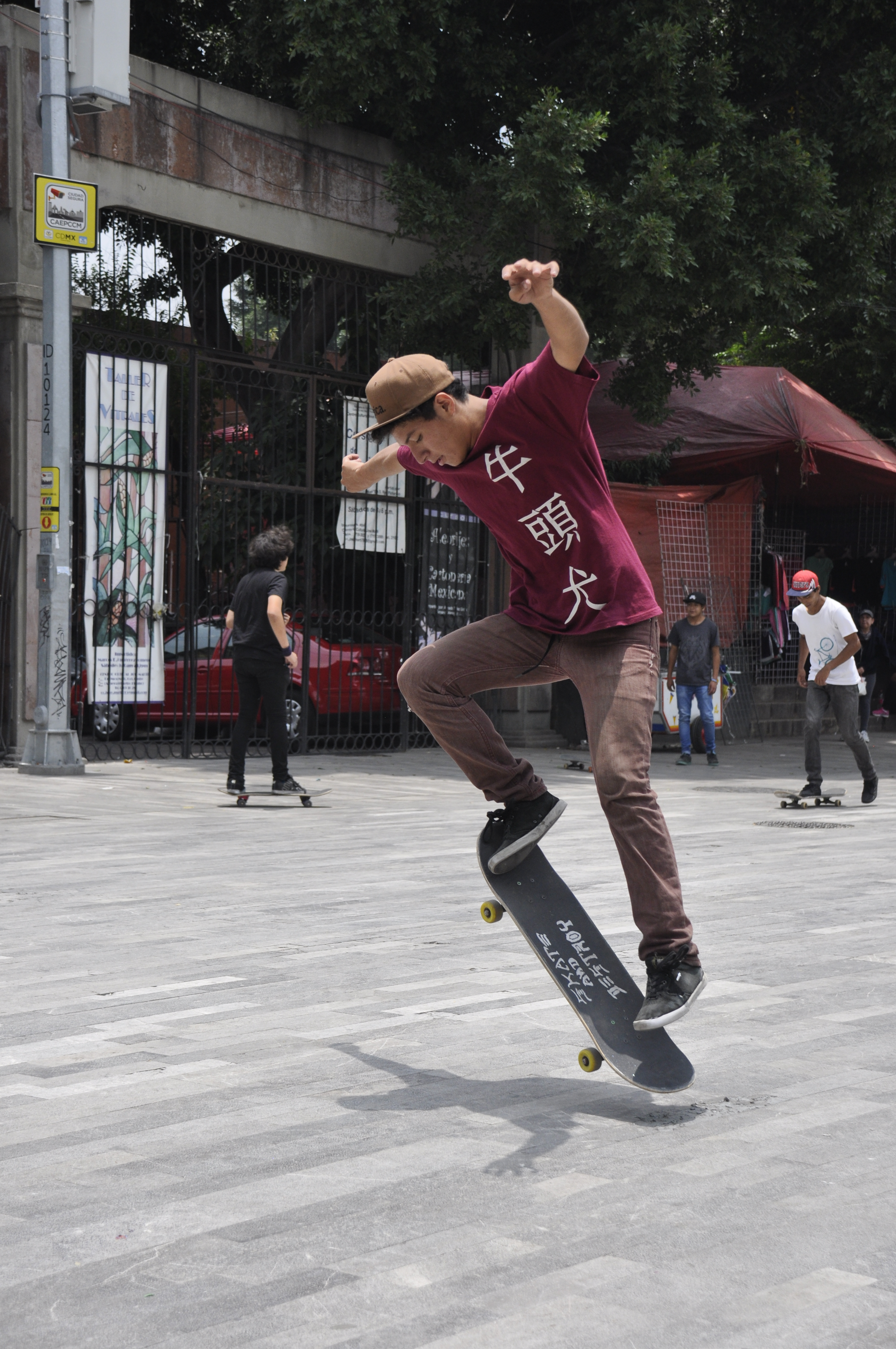
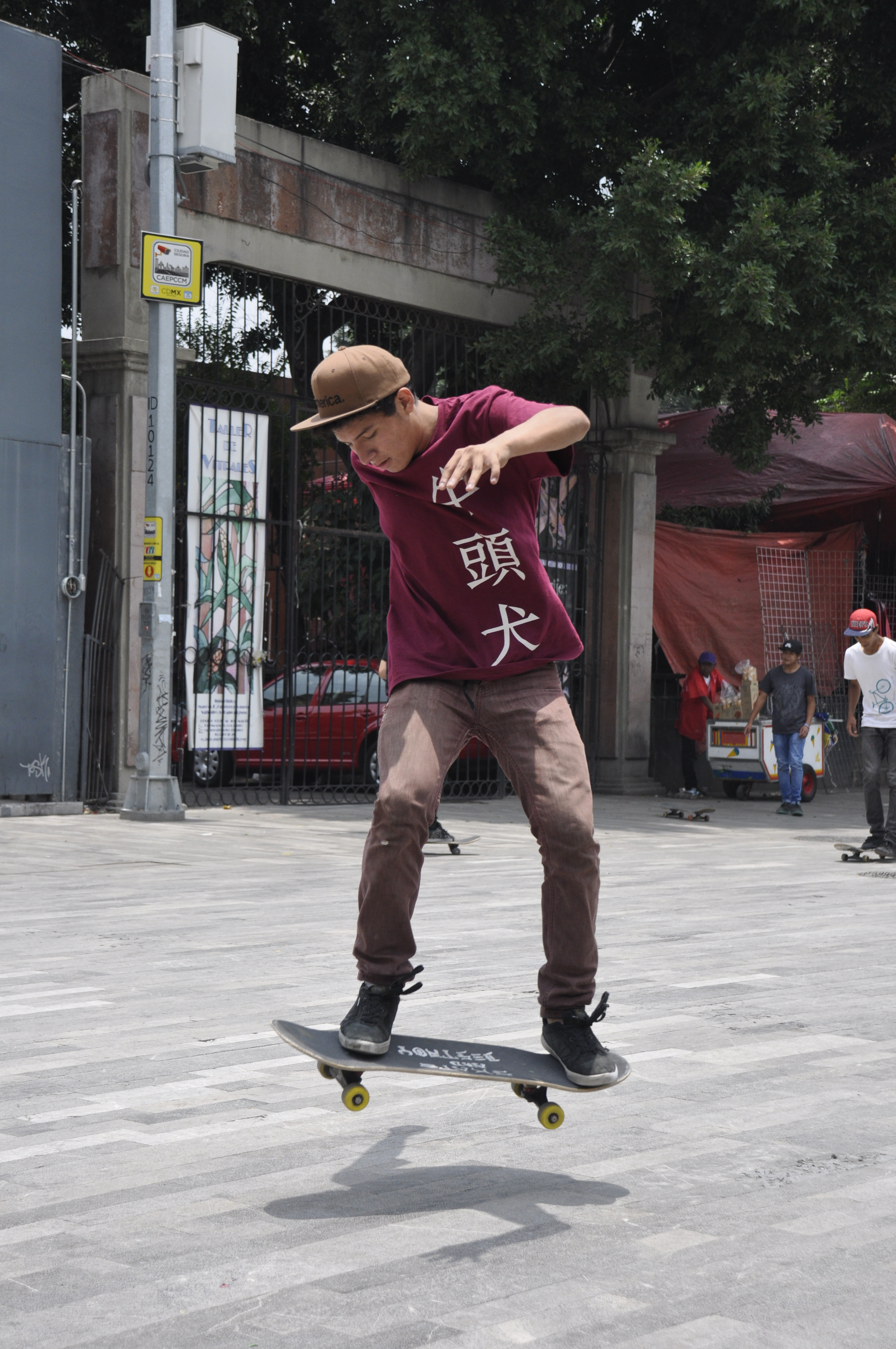
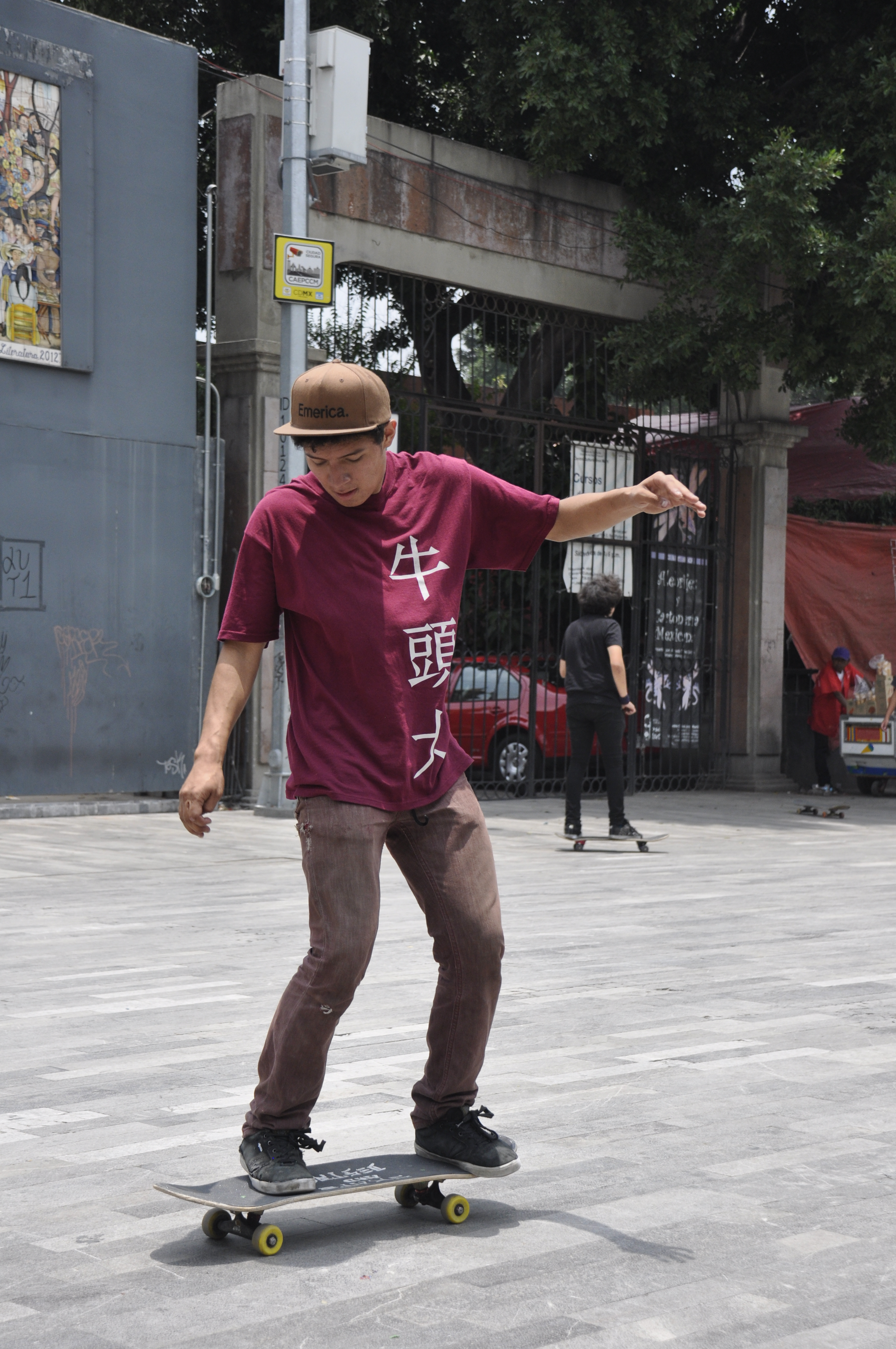
180º ollie technique. Alameda Central, Mexico City, 2015

== Other variations ==
- Alley-oop: sideways move in the opposite direction.
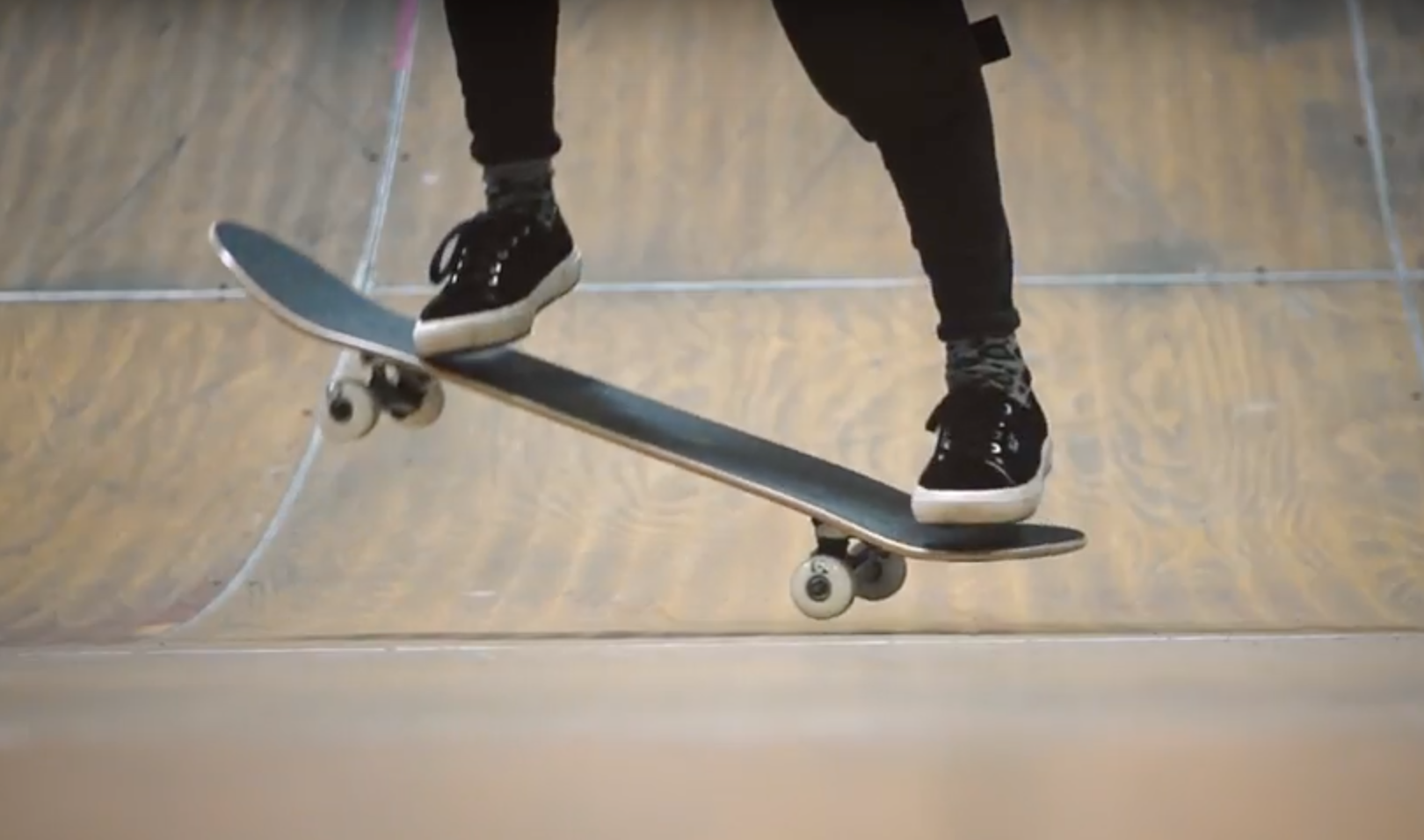
- An example of a very low ollie
  Ollie 180: an Ollie where the skateboarder and the skateboard spins 180 degrees after leaving the ground. Both the skateboarder and the skateboard rotate in the same direction (Frontside or Backside) with the skateboarder's feet sticking to the skateboard. This trick is usually referred to as a frontside or backside 180, or, less frequently and more popular with older skateboarders and/or when performed on a bank/quarterpipe, a frontside/backside ollie.
- Nollie 180: just like the Ollie 180 but done from a Nollie.
- Half-Cab: just like the Ollie 180 but done in fakie. If rotated 360 degrees the trick is called a Full-Cab or Caballerial, named after Steve Caballero who invented them as aerials in pools. Cab and half-cab spins only include fakie backside. A fakie frontside 180 is not a half-cab.
- Ollie 360: is a full 360 rotation of the body and board together in one motion, whether front-side or back-side can be attained from this variation.
- One Foot: an Ollie where the front foot is kicked forward over the nose of the board.
- Ollie North: the original name for the one foot
- Boned Ollie: an ollie where the front of the board is dipped down and the legs are practically horizontal, like a "Melon Grab" but without the skateboarder actually grabbing the skateboard.
- Ghost Ollie: an ollie where the skateboarder's feet are above and not touching the board but the board and the skateboarder are still in air.
- Primo Ollie: is an Ollie performed when standing in a primo position or when doing a primo slide. A primo Ollie is executed in the same way as an Ollie but the side of the front foot levels out the board instead of the top of the foot.
- Hop Ollie: an Ollie using only one foot, such as a "Hop Nollie" (not the same as a no-comply)
- Chinese Ollie: executed without hitting the tail of the skateboard to the ground, instead the skateboarder uses cracks in the sidewalk, by "bouncing" off them, to get air-time.
