= Shove-it =

Skateboarding trick

A shove-it (or shuvit) is a skateboarding trick where the skateboarder makes the board spin 180 degrees (or more) without the tail of the board hitting the ground under their feet. There are many variations of the shove-it but they all follow the same principle: The skateboarder's lead foot remains in one spot, while the back foot performs the "shove". The pop shove-it was originally called a "Ty hop", named after Ty Page.

== 180 shove-it ==
A shove-it is performed by standing on the board, jumping up a bit and scooping the tail down and to its side. Even though the tail should not touch the ground and the board should not lift off the ground more than about an inch, the board should quickly spin 180 degrees. The skateboarder then catches the board with their feet after it has completed the 180-degree rotation and lands on it. There are 2 types of shove-its, a frontside (when the user pushes the tail of the board forward with their back foot) and a backside shove-it (when the user pushes their back foot backwards as if to jump forwards). A backside shove-it (commonly shortened to just shove-it or shuv) is performed by putting the back foot with the toes hanging off of the front of the board, and doing a short, but quick movement spinning the board underneath the user. A frontside shove-it (commonly shortened to frontside shuv) is when the users toes and the ball of the back foot is on the board. The user then pushes, or kicks, their back foot forward to cause the rotation.

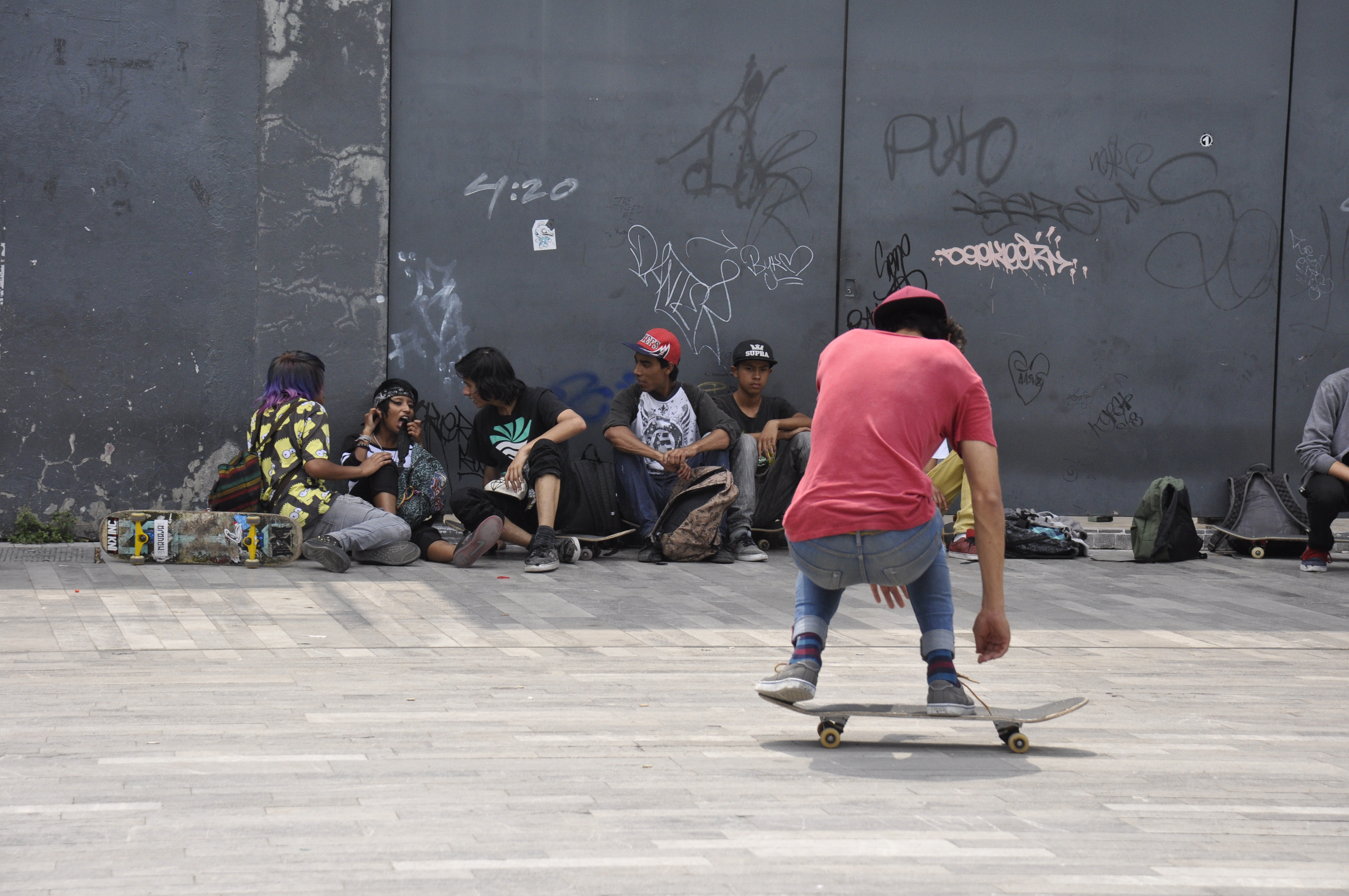
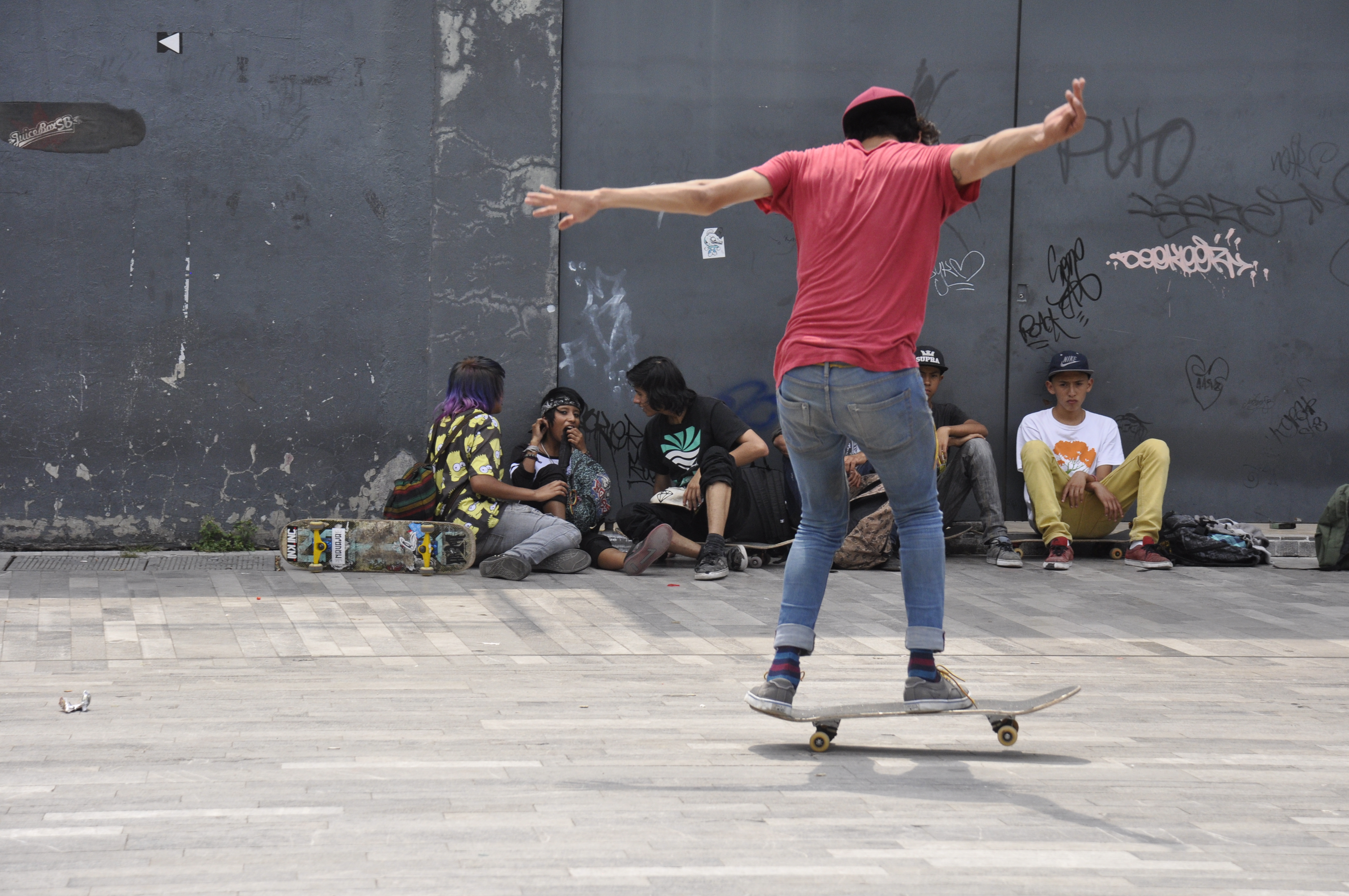
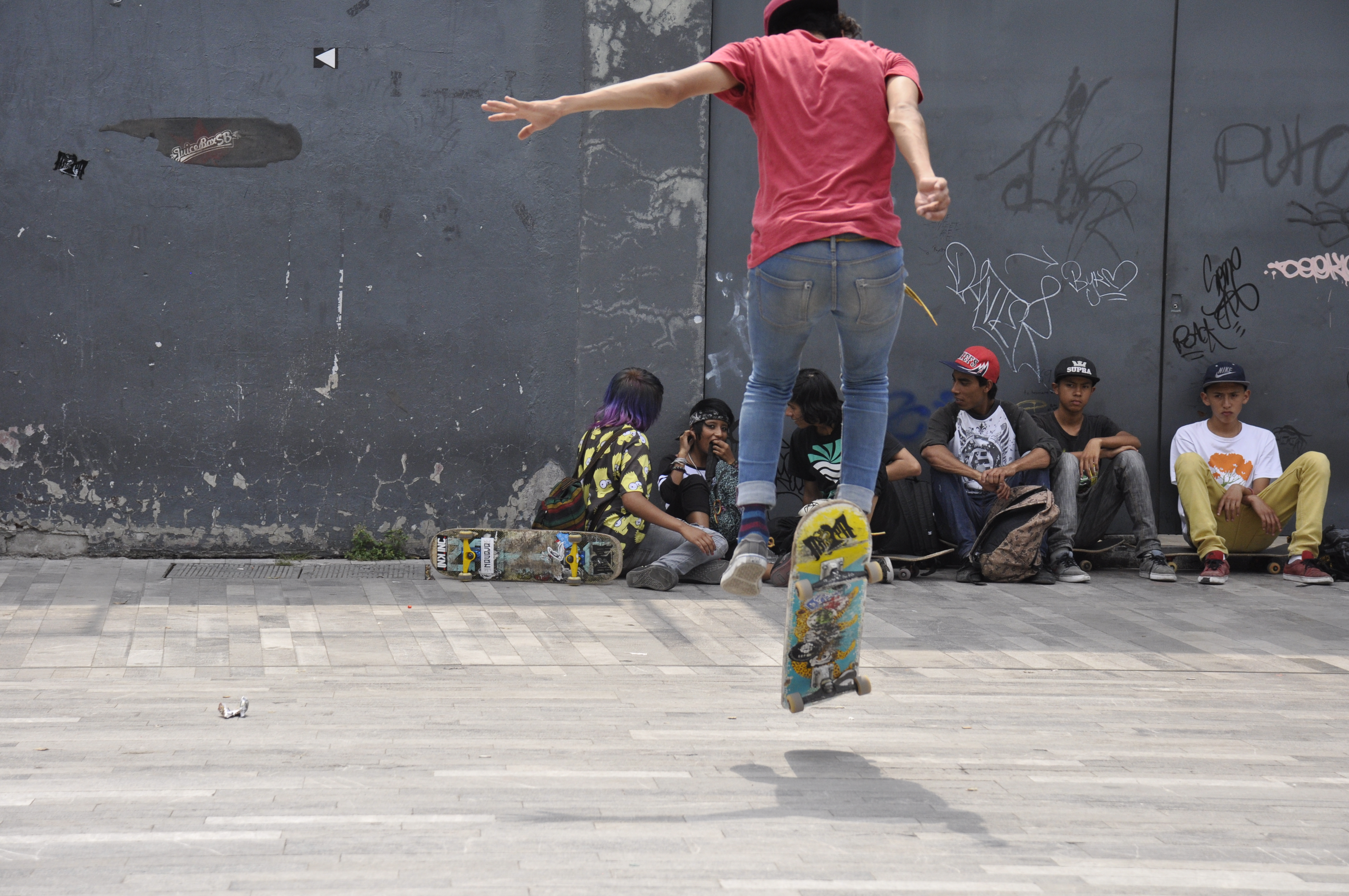
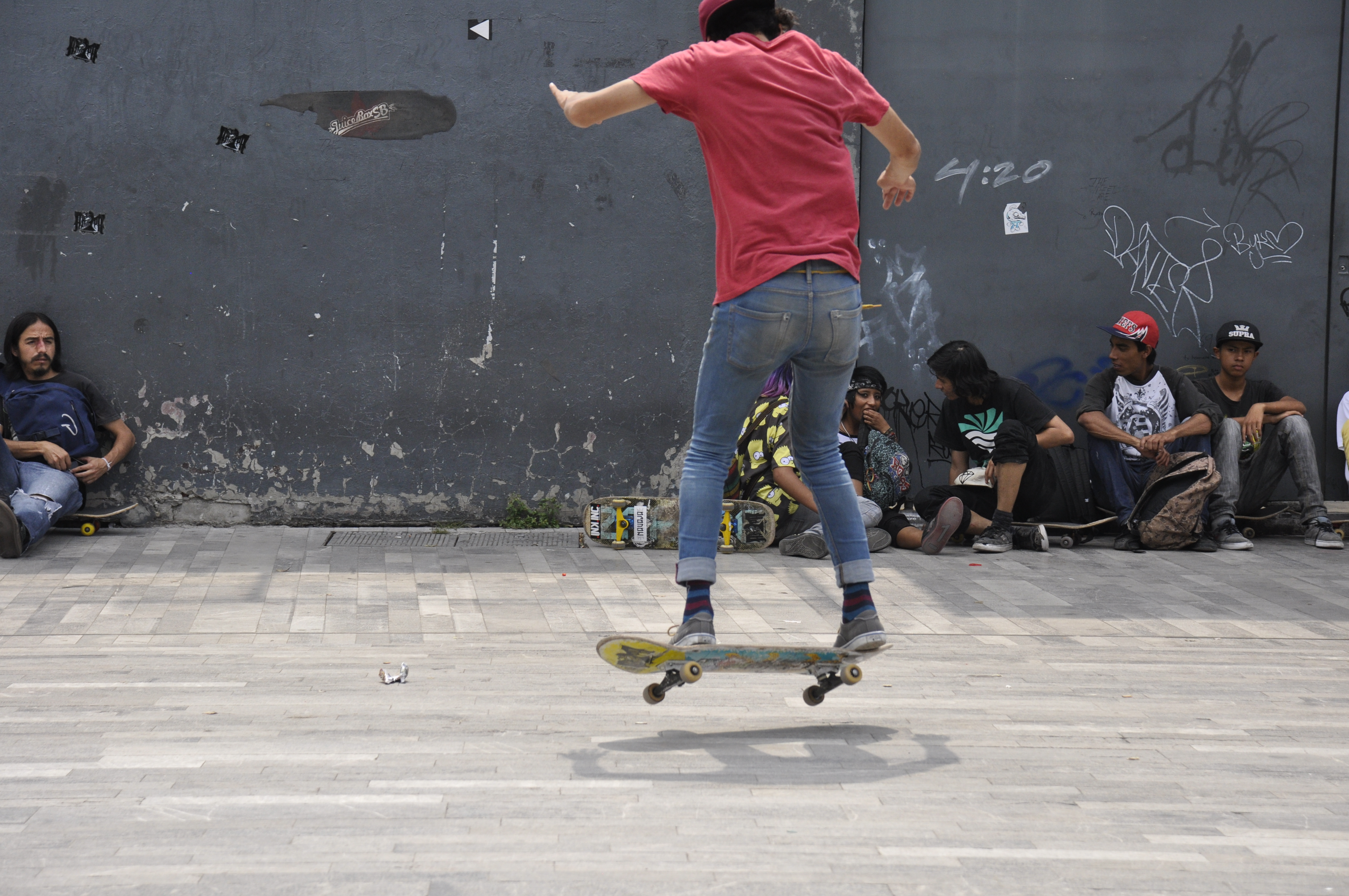
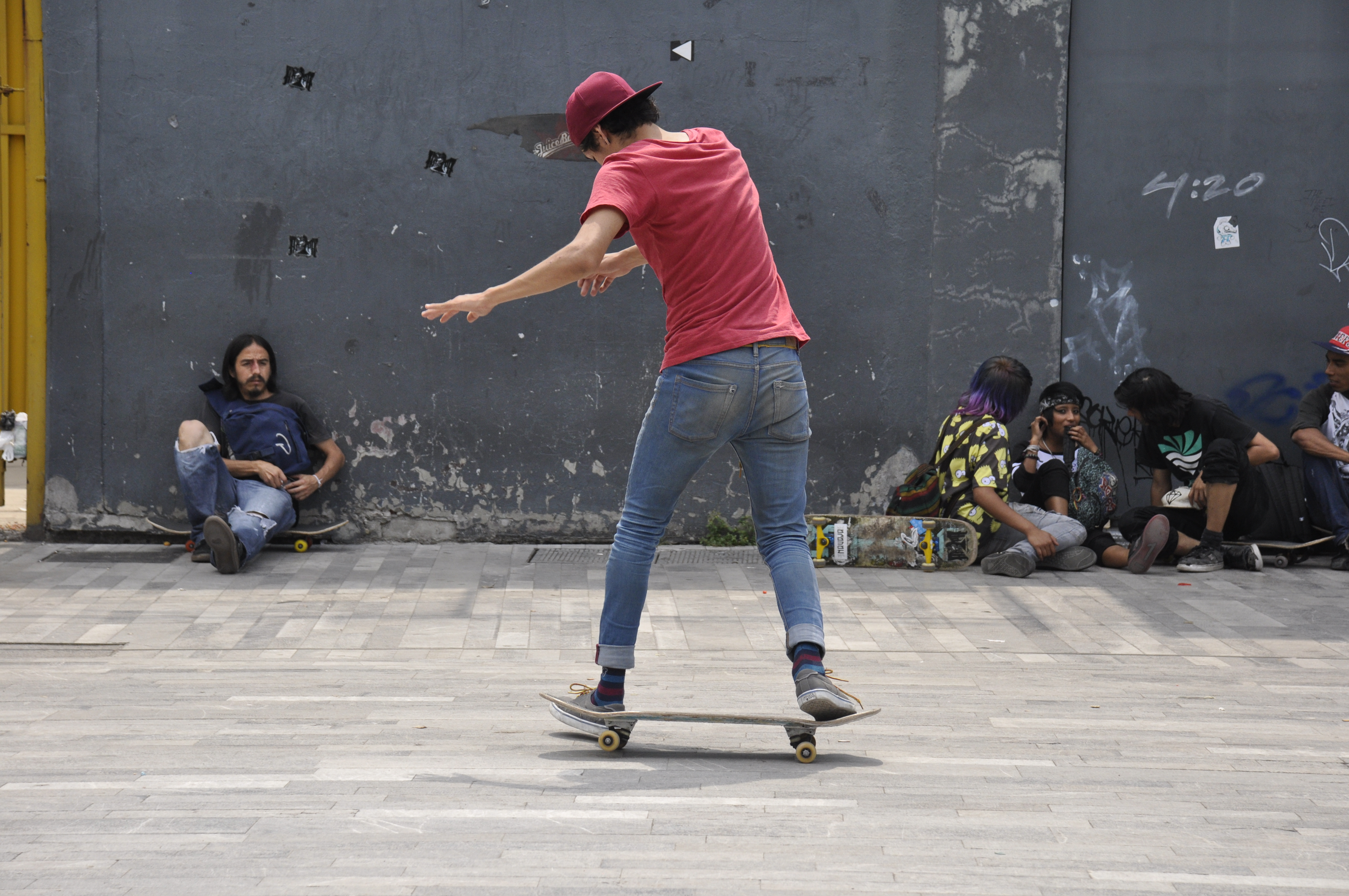
180 Fakie Frontside Shove it. Alameda Central, Mexico City, 2015.

== 360 shove-it ==
The 360 shove-it (or 3-shove) is a variation of shove-it where the board spins a full 360 degrees. Pop shove-it is a variation of both the ollie and the shove-it. The 540 variation of this trick was invented by Jasper McLean in 1979.

== Pop shove-it ==
An example of a pop shove-it

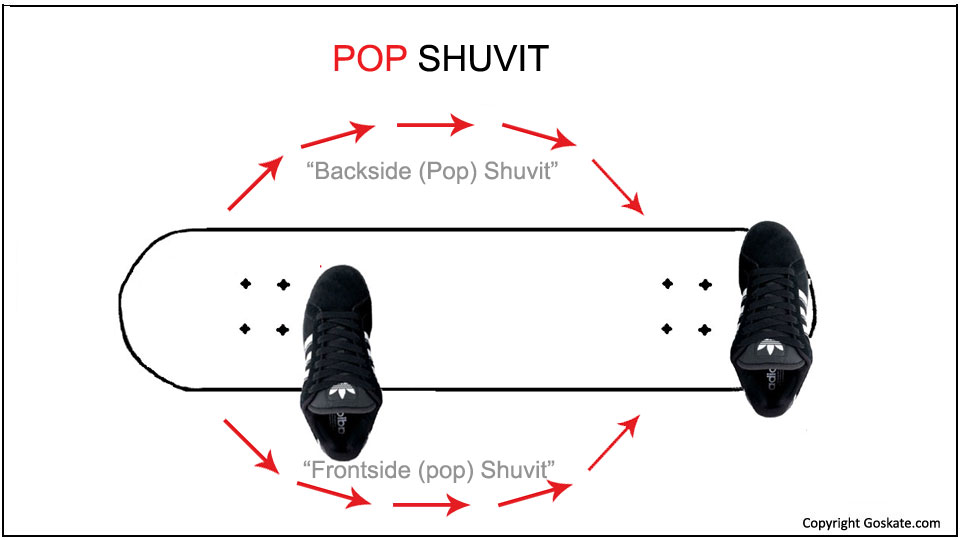
180 Shove-it or Shuvit Diagram

Unlike a shove-it, a pop shove-it starts like an ollie, as the skateboarder jumps and kicks the tail of the board down to make the board airborne. The trick then proceeds like a shove-it, with the tail kicked clockwise or counter-clockwise to make the board spin.

During a pop shove-it, the board reaches a greater height in the air than during the execution of a usual shove-it; thus, it can be performed while jumping over obstacles. Like any rotating trick, the pop shove-it can be performed frontside or backside.

== Late shove-it ==
Similar to a late flip, this trick combines an ollie with a pop shove-it, usually frontside, with the skater delaying the shove-it until the ollie is at its peak.

== Big spin ==
The board spins 360 degrees, while the rider spins 180 degrees in the same direction; sometimes the trick is combined with a kickflip—a trick that has been named the "bigspin flip"—or it is combined with a heelflip, a trick that has been named the "bigspin heel". The trick is named after Brian Lotti, whose name sounds like "lottery"—his friend named the trick after the California Lottery's "Big Spin" game.

== Bigger spin ==
A step above the big spin. the board does a 540 degree rotation, while the rider rotates 180 degrees in the same direction.

== Gazelle spin ==
Derived from gazelle flips, the board does a 540 degree spin and the rider spins 360 degree spin in the same direction.

== Plasma spin ==
A plasma spin is a frontside bigspin impossible, meaning it is identical to a frontside bigspin except for the fact that board wraps around the back foot as in an impossible.

== Other variations ==
Varial kickflips, varial heelflips, hardflips, inward heelflips, and 360 flips are all common tricks combined with the pop shove-it. In the case of the varial heelflip, it is a frontside pop shove-it combined with a heelflip, while the 360 flip combines a 360 pop shove-it with a kickflip.

== Records ==
On June 16, 2018, Polish skater Adam Żaczek set a world record by doing 68 shove-its in a minute.
