= Skateboarding trick =

Trick performed on a skateboard

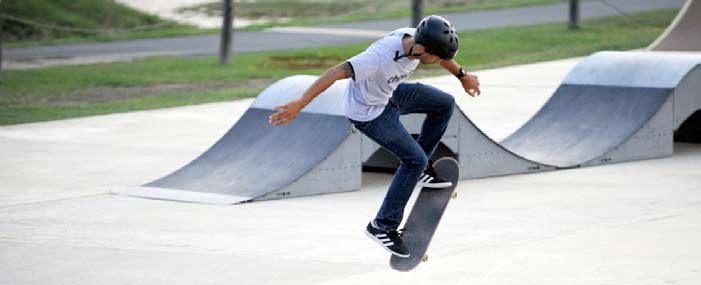
A skater performs an ollie

A skateboarding trick, or simply a trick, is a manoeuvre performed while riding a skateboard, in a specific way to achieve the desired outcome, often involving flips, rotations, or aerial movements.

== History ==
Though skateboards emerged in the 1900s, skateboarding tricks like the ones done today did not appear until decades later. In the 1970s and earlier, the most common tricks were "2D" freestyle types such as manuals and pivots. Only later in the 1980s and early 1990s were common modern-day tricks like the ollie and heel-flip invented by Alan Gelfand and Rodney Mullen, setting the stage for other aerial tricks. The invention of these tricks changed the skateboarding lifestyle for many years to come.

== Types ==
=== Ollie ===
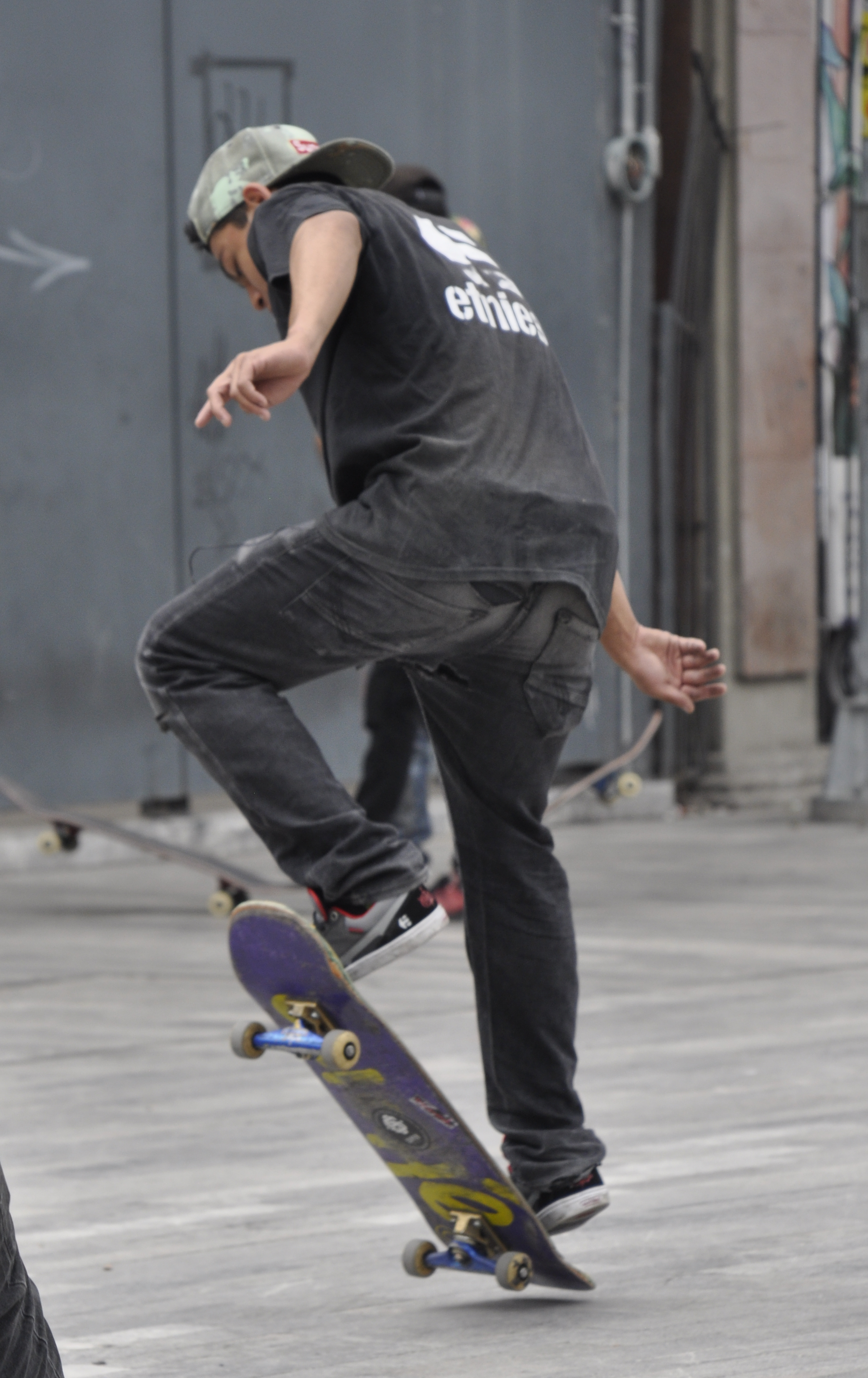
Ollie

An ollie is a jump where the front wheels leave the ground first. This motion is attained with a snap of the tail (from the back foot) and sliding one's front foot forward to reach any altitude. A lot of technical tricks transpire from this element (e.g. the kickflip, heelflip, 360-flip). A nollie is when the back wheels leave the ground first by snapping the nose of the board, with the back foot sliding towards the tail. There is also a switch ollie, which is simply an ollie in switch stance position. The switch stance position is the opposite position of how the rider would normally ride.

=== Grabs ===
A grab involves floating in the air, while using either hand to hold the board against the feet or keeping constant and careful pressure on the board with the feet to keep it from floating away. The Indy grab usually combines rotation with different grabs. This class of tricks was first popularized when Tony Hawk became famous for his frontside airs in empty swimming pools in the late 1970s and has expanded to include the bulk of skateboarding tricks to this day, including the ollie and all of its variations. The 900 and 1080 fall under the class of aerials, though these are commonly confused with aerial grabs.

=== Flip tricks ===
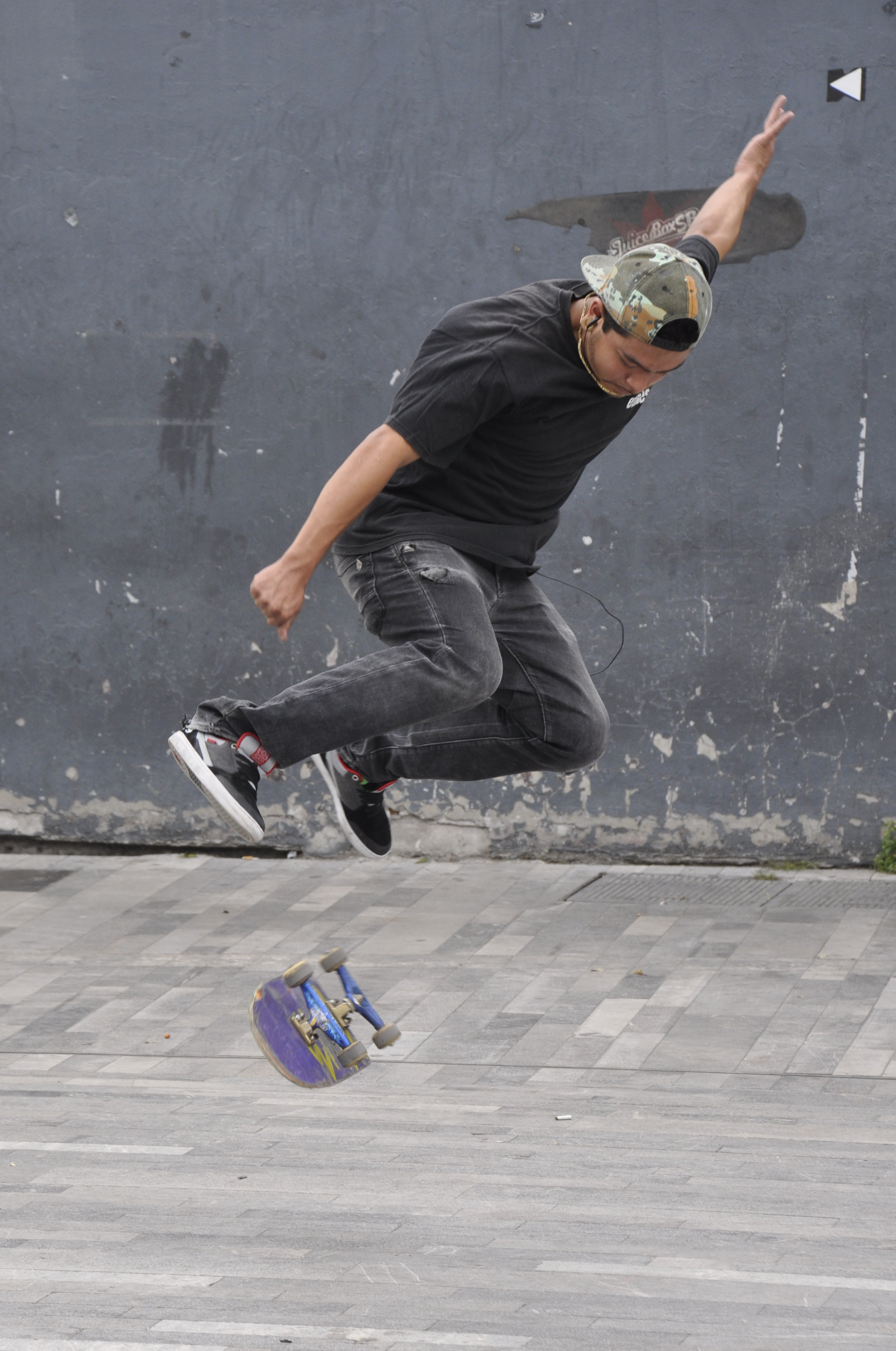
Kickflip

Flip tricks are a subset of aerials which are all based on the ollie. An example is the kickflip, the most widely known and performed flip trick. The board can be spun around many different axes as part of a flip trick, thus combining several rotations into one trick. These tricks are undoubtedly most popular among street skateboarding purists, although skaters with other styles perform them as well. The famous placing of the board on the feet and then jumping was created in 1987 by Nathan Lipor. Combining spins and flips is extremely popular in today's culture. A common trick in skateboarding lines is a 360 flip, or tre flip. A 360 flip is the combination of a skateboard spinning 360 degrees and a kickflip. There are also double kickflips and triple kickflips, which are very difficult.

=== Freestyle ===
Freestyle skateboarding tricks are tricks specifically associated with freestyle skateboarding. They are part of the building blocks and some of the most important reference points for tricks which have evolved to form street skateboarding.

=== Slides and grinds ===
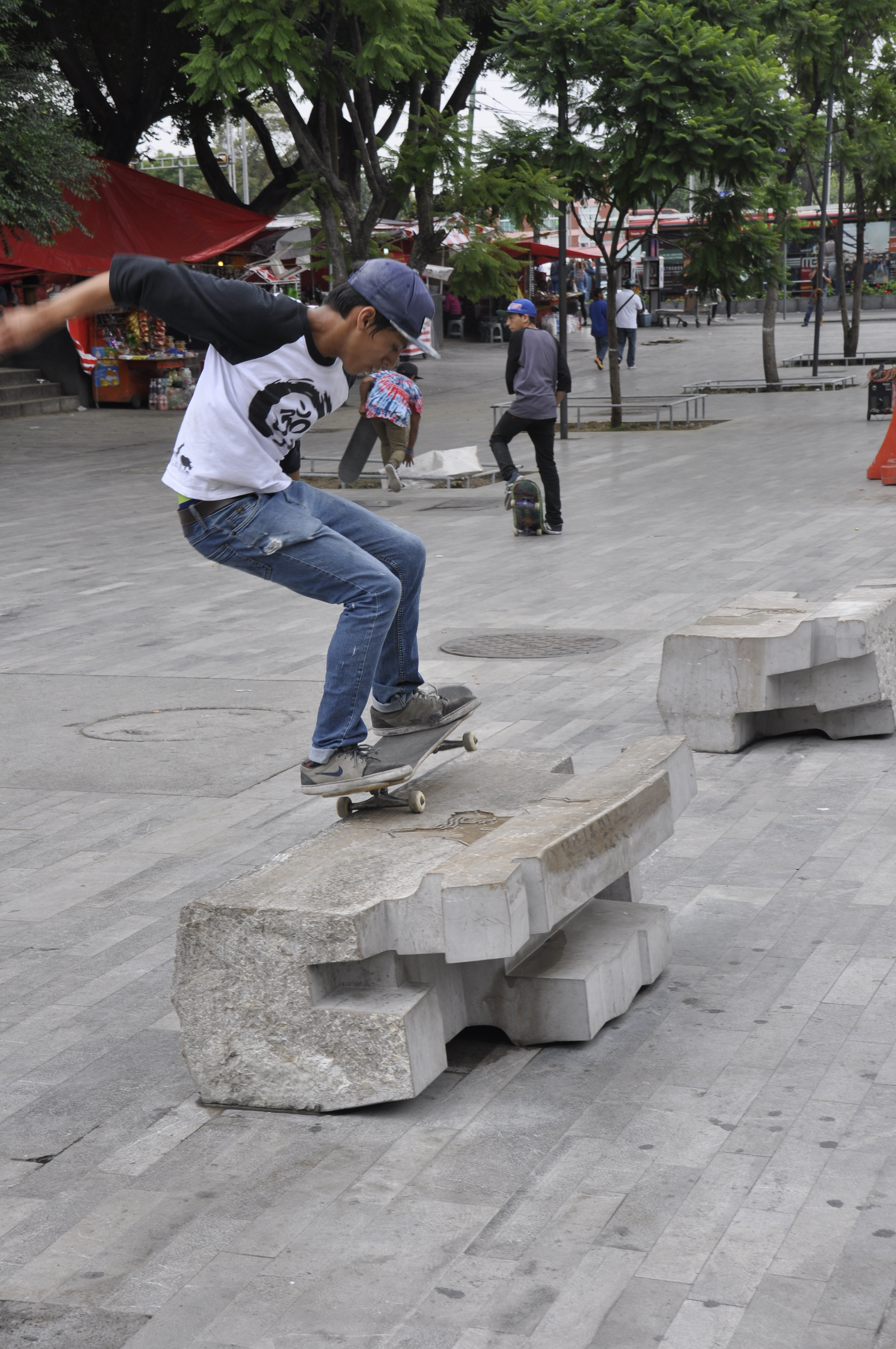
Frontside 5-0 grind

Slides and grinds involve getting the board up on some type of ledge, rail, or coping and sliding or grinding along the board or trucks, respectively. When it is primarily the board which is contacting the edge, it is called a slide; when it is the truck, it is a grind. Grinding and sliding skateboards started with sliding the board on parking blocks and curbs, then extended to using the coping on swimming pools, then stairway handrails, and has now been expanded to include almost every possible type of edge. Grinds and slides on street environments were brought to mainstream skateboarding by professional skateboarders Natas Kaupas and Mark Gonzales.

=== Manuals ===
A manual is a balancing trick where a skateboarder balances on either the front two or rear two wheels, without the other two wheels or any other part of the skateboard touching the ground for the entire duration of the trick. The trick is often performed at speed and technical skateboarders such as Daewon Song are renowned for performing tricks such as the kickflip both in and out of the trick, whilst also simultaneously doing so up onto, over and off ledges, blocks, benches and other street obstacles.
