= Kickflip =

Skateboarding trick

The kickflip is a skateboarding trick, in which the rider flips their skateboard 360° along the axis that extends from the nose to the tail of the deck. When the rider is regular footed the board spins clockwise if viewed from the front.

It was the first of many modern tricks to be invented by Rodney Mullen in the early 1980s, and it opened the door to contemporary concepts of board sports wherein the board and rider separate then re-join. In March 2011, Zoltan "The Magician" Torkos was credited to land the first kickflip on a surfboard.

== Origin ==
In the 1970s freestyle skateboarders learned to flip the board over beneath them by lifting a rail edge of the board–and flipping it without any leverage of the tail. While the board flipped completely over, the technique employed no upward force, and the setup required the rider to stand with both feet facing the nose. Any connection to the contemporary kickflip is conceptual, since the two tricks employ radically different riding styles on boards that do not have comparable functional features.

In 1982 Rodney Mullen invented the modern form of the trick in Massachusetts, initially naming it the "Ollie Flip"; the term "Magic Flip" was popularized by other skaters who could not figure out how Mullen was flipping his board. The kickflip employs many of the same techniques that Alan Gelfand discovered when he created the technique for the ollie, but Gelfand's ollie unifies the board and rider using both feet in a single reaction of force and counterforce wherein board and rider bounce into the air and come back down in unison. Mullen's kickflip separates the board and rider using both feet in opposing reactions of force and counterforce wherein the rider flicks, the board flips, and the rider catches it only returning to unison in the downward arc of the trick.

This technique of separating the board and rider became a tremendous amount of the vernacular of street skaters–and later vert skaters–introducing skateboarding to the era of flip tricks, many of which Rodney Mullen also created. Many of the skaters credited with defining skate culture, and discovering how to use flip tricks in a contemporary manner–Daewon Song, Ronnie Creager, Kareem Campbell, Enrique Lorenzo, JB Gillet–were sponsored by Mullen's company World Industries.

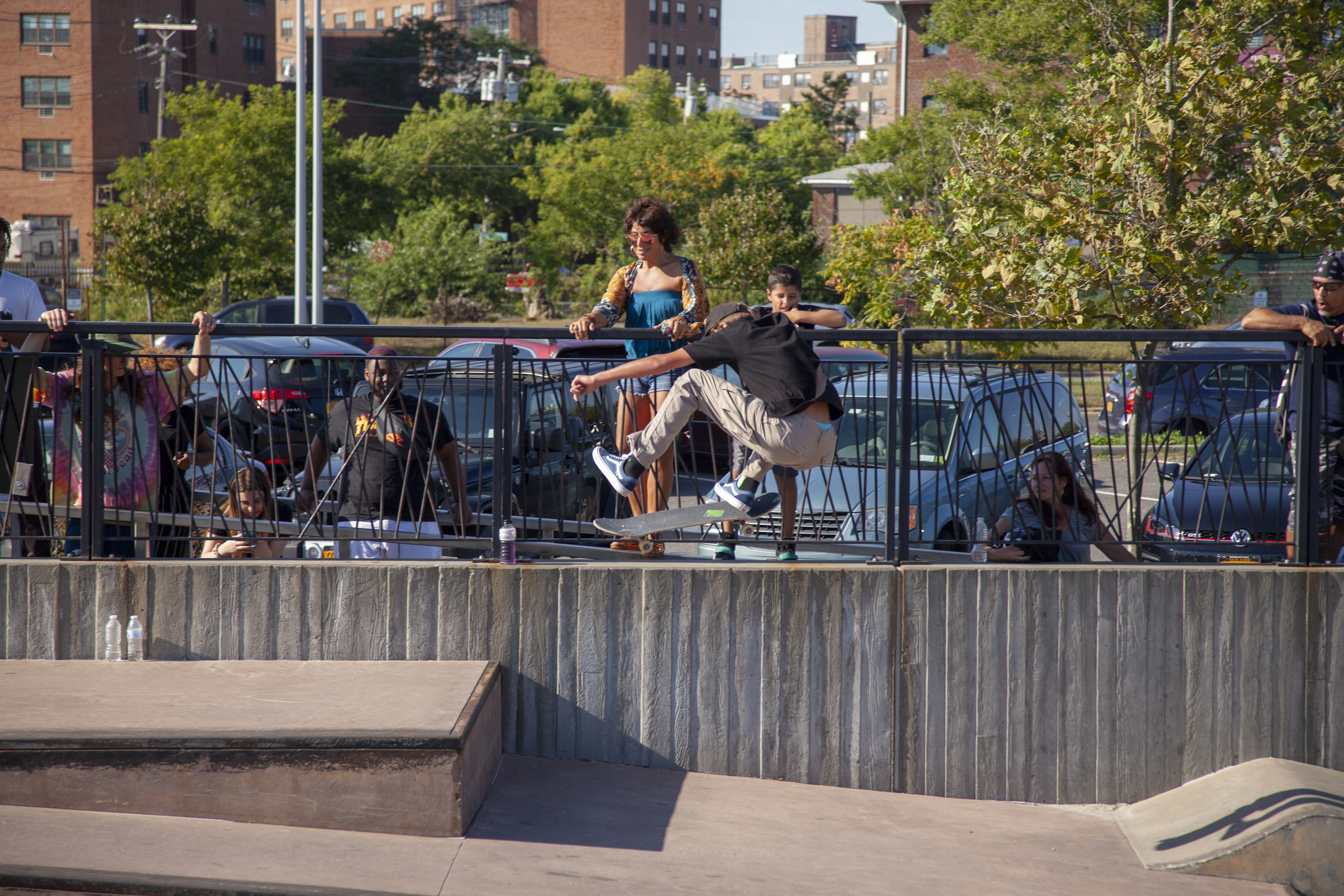
Cooper Qua with the kickflip transfer at Far Rockaway Skatepark

== Execution ==
Video of a skateboarder performing a Kickflip

To perform a kickflip, the rider ollies into the air and lifts the back foot from the board while simultaneously sliding the front foot across the skateboard diagonally forward and towards the heel side. This front foot motion, sometimes called "the flick", spins the board, flipping it completely over. Before landing, the rider stops the spin by returning the feet to the board as it nears its original position.

The board revolves around its longitudinal axis, like an aileron roll. To understand this motion and the direction of rotation, imagine stepping backwards off a skateboard, leaving it in front of you, then rolling it over on the ground toward you; during the kickflip, the board spins similarly, but in mid-air beneath the rider. During a heelflip, a similar trick, the rider slides their front heel toward the opposite side that they would with a kick flip, resulting in a rotation of the board opposite to the kick flip.

== Variations ==
Once a skateboarder masters the kickflip, many variations are possible:

- Using a faster "flick" motion, the rider can spin the board multiple revolutions before landing. These tricks are named with respect to the number of revolutions: Double Kickflip (or "Double Flip"), Triple Flip, etc.

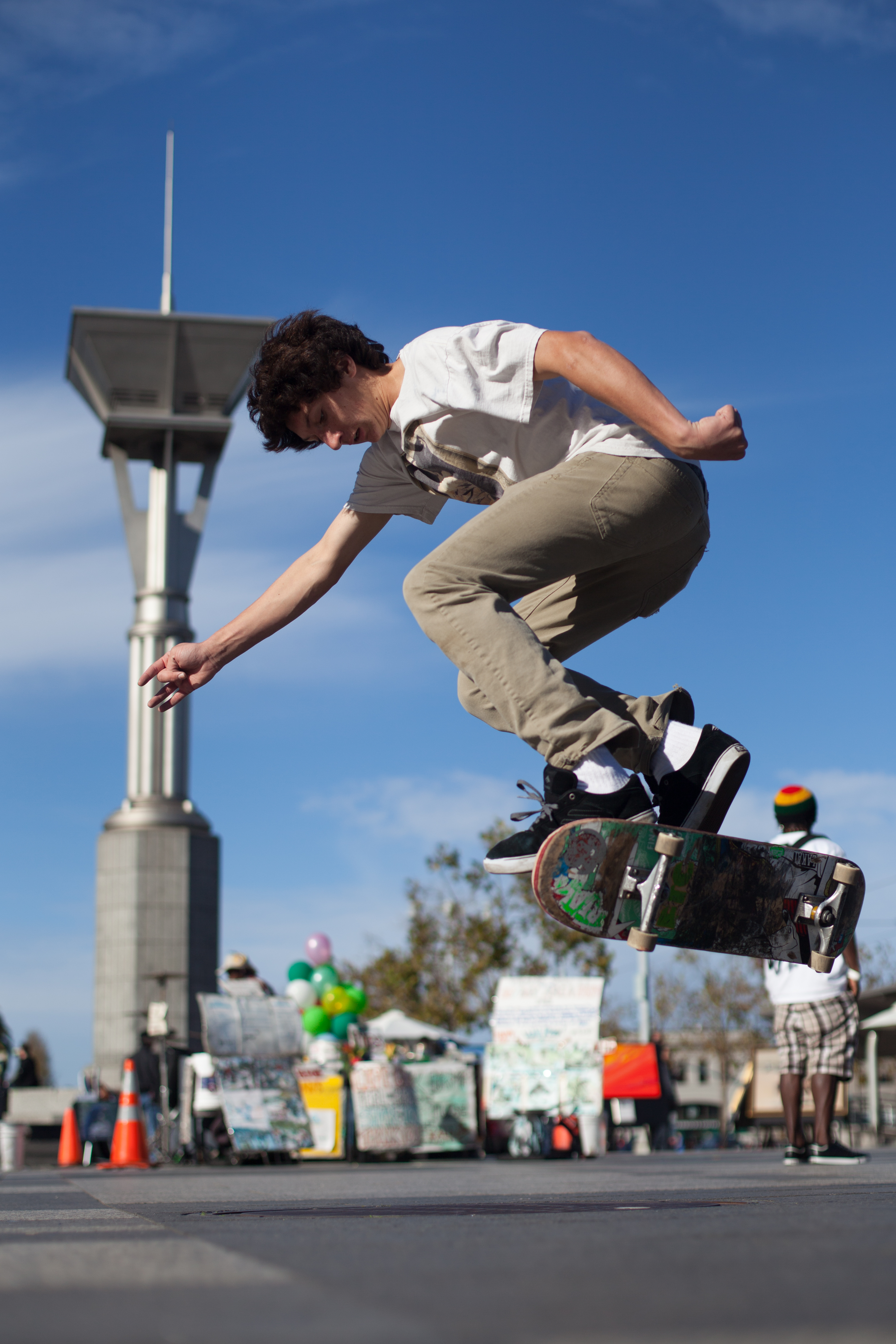
Hardflip

- Many tricks combine the kickflip with a revolution of the board on the z axis in multiples of 180 degrees, as happens during a pop shove-it. Backside rotations form the Varial Flip (180 degrees), 360 Flip, 540 Flip, etc. Frontside rotations form the Hardflip (180 degrees) and 360 Hardflip.
- During a kickflip the board and rider may both rotate together frontside or backside. These tricks are generally named using the number of degrees rotated and the direction of the spin—e.g. Backside 180 Kickflip (or "Backside Flip")—but may have special names for 360 rotations.

"Backside Flip" over a ventilation grille

- The rider may rotate Backside or frontside in the air while the board does not. The most common variation is the Kickflip Body Varial, where the rider spin frontside 180 degrees, landing on the board in switch stance.
- The rider and board may rotate in opposite directions. These rarer tricks have less-established names. Some skaters have coined "Mother Flip" to describe a 360 Flip (rotating backside) combined with a 360 frontside body varial.
- During the board's spin, the rider may catch it with his/her hand(s) before landing. These tricks are often named according to the type of grab used. E.g. Kickflip Indy, Kickflip Melon.
- The rider may initiate the board's flip later in the ollie (after the ascent), or with the foot used to pop the board off the ground (the back foot in an ollie or front foot in a nollie). E.g., the most common is a Nollie Lateflip (or "Frontfoot Lateflip"), where the rider initiates the "flick" of a kickflip in the middle of a nollie. The Backfoot Lateflip (or "Late Backfoot Flip") has the rider using the back foot to initiate the flip during an ollie. Generally in "late" flips, since the flip occurs when the board is more parallel to the ground, the rider must initiate it with a downward tap of the foot rather than sliding a foot off an edge.
- The Double Kickflip is often combined with other types of kickflips. Examples include the Varial Double Flip (180 degree backside rotation), Double Hardflip (180 degree frontside rotation), and the Double 360 Flip (360 degree backside rotation).
- During the flip of the board, the rider may use the top of the front foot to alter the trick. In a Kickflip Underflip, the rider reverses the direction of the spin after the board has flipped once. In a Hospital Flip, the rider stops the rotation half-way, then flips the board 180 degrees on the axis pointing in the direction of the rider's feet so it lands right side up in the opposite direction.

== See also ==
- Street skateboarding
- Skateboarding
- Ollie
- Rodney Mullen
