= Stay on Board: The Leo Baker Story =

2022 documentary

- Poster
- Directed by: Nicola Marsh; Giovanni Reda
- Produced by: Jennifer Goodridge; Mark Monroe; Miranda Soto
- Edited by: Sasha Perry; Lauren Saffa
- Music by: Alex Somers
- Production company: GLAAD
- Distributed by: Netflix
- Release date: August 11, 2022
- Country: United States
- Language: English

Stay on Board: The Leo Baker Story is a 2022 American Netflix original biographical documentary film directed by Nicola Marsh and Giovanni Reda. Its story follows American skateboarder Leo Baker and details his journey and struggles during his career due to being a trans man.

The film premiered at the 2022 Outfest Los Angeles LGBTQ+ Film Festival on 21 July 2022 where it won the audience award for documentary feature. It was released by Netflix on August 11, 2022.
