= Terry Kennedy (skateboarder) =

American skateboarder

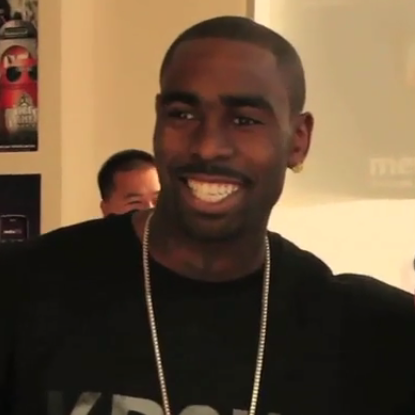
- Kennedy in 2011
- Born: May 27, 1985 (age 41); Long Beach, California, U.S.
- Other names: Compton Ass Terry, TK
- Occupation: Skateboarder
- Height: 6 ft 2 in (1.88 m)
- Criminal charges: Aggravated battery (two counts)
- Criminal penalty: Five years, served 3
- Criminal status: Paroled

Terry Kennedy (born May 27, 1985), sometimes referred to by his nicknames "TK" or "Compton-Ass Terry", is an American former professional skateboarder from Long Beach, California. He was sponsored by Baker Skateboards and Pharrell's Billionaire Boys Club. He is the co-founder of Fly Society, a clothing and music brand.

== Personal life ==
=== Shooting ===
In June 2005, Kennedy was shot twice while leaving a party in Long Beach; once in the forearm and once in the jaw. He later recovered.

=== Murder charge ===
Kennedy was arrested on July 27, 2021, at a motel in Oakbrook Terrace, Illinois, for the assault and subsequent death of fellow skateboarder Josiah Kassahun. Kennedy was charged with murder in the first degree. Kennedy was represented by senior assistant public defender Michael J. Sweeney.

Following trial, Kennedy was acquitted of the murder charge on December 2, 2022, but he was convicted of two counts of aggravated battery. On February 28, 2023, Kennedy was sentenced to five years in prison on the battery charge.

Kennedy was released from prison December 31, 2025.

== Appearances ==
Kennedy appeared on Bam Margera's MTV television shows Viva La Bam, Bam's Unholy Union and Rob Dyrdek's MTV show Rob Dyrdek's Fantasy Factory. He also made cameo appearance in Snoop Dogg's chart-topping song "Drop It Like It's Hot", as well as in the video for Mistah Fab's song "Ghost Ride It". Kennedy was also featured on ABC Family's show Switched! He appears in the skateboarding video game Skate and its sequels Skate 2, 3 and Skate It. Kennedy also appeared on the documentary Beef IV to discuss a beef he had with Lupe Fiasco.

== Filmography ==
=== Videos ===
Skate videos that Kennedy has appeared in includes:

- Ice Cream Vol. 1
- Baker 2G
- Summer Tour 2001
- Baker 3
- Baker Has a Deathwish
- Shake Junt's Chicken Bone Nowison
- Bake and Destroy

=== Film ===
Title	Year	Role	Other notes
Dirty	2005	Terry	Minor role
Street Dreams	2009	Reese	Main role
Minghags: The Movie	2009	Compton Ass Terry	Cameo

=== Television ===
Title	Year	Role	Other notes
Viva La Bam	2003–2006	Himself	
Run's House	2008	Himself	
Being Terry Kennedy	2010	Himself	

=== Documentary ===
Title	Year	Role	Other notes
Beef IV	2010	Himself	
