= Ryan Gallant =

American skateboarder

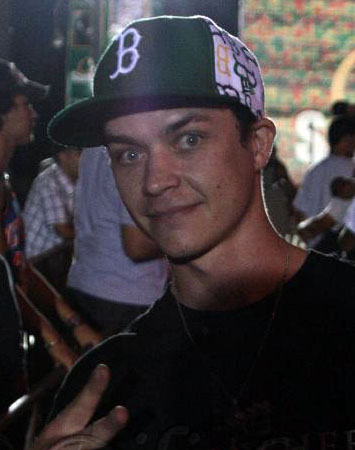
- Gallant in 2007
- Born: May 25, 1982 (age 44); Waltham, Massachusetts, U.S.
- Spouse: Summer Gallant

Ryan Gallant (born May 25, 1982) is an American professional skateboarder with a goofy-footed stance.

== Early life ==
Gallant was born in Waltham, Massachusetts. He began skateboarding as a youth in Waltham, where the skateboarding scene was abundant and robust with such skateboarders as Matt Schnorr (Null Skateboards, Es' shoes, Eastern Boarder and Next gen skateshop), Chi Chi Rodriguez, And Matthew Place (Place Matt) (Next Gen Skateshop, Concepts Skateshop, MNC flowteam) as well as many others from the local "skate scene" although he was later raised in Southborough, Massachusetts.

== Professional career ==
Gallant was first noticed in the skate video PJ Ladd's Wonderful Horrible Life, a shop video from Boston, Massachusetts's Coliseum skate shop. He is also affiliated with True East Skateshop, which is an East Coast-based chain of "mom and pop" shops.

Gallant was first sponsored by Expedition One skateboards and appeared in the company's first video Alone. In April 2009, Gallant left his longtime sponsor DC Shoes and established a sponsorship deal with Circa.

The "Gallant Grind" is a skateboard trick that is named after Gallant.

=== Sponsors ===
As of December 2015, Gallant is sponsored by Expedition One, Bones Swiss Bearings, Gold Wheels, MOB Grip, Silver Trucks.

== Videography ==
- Digital: Who Let the Dogs out (2001)
- Monkey Business: Project of a lifetime (2002)
- Gold Wheels: Got Gold? (2002)
- Expedition-One "Alone" (2002)
- PJ Ladd's Wonderful Horrible Life (2002)
- DC: The DC Video (2003)
- Digital "Everyday" (2003)
- The Kayo Corp: Promo (2004)
- Transworld Skateboarding: First Love (2005)
- Plan B: Live After Death (2006)
- Plan B: "Superfuture" (2008)
- C1rca: "Welcome" (2011)
- Expedition: "Madness" (2011)
- Expedition: "All Ages" (2013)
- Da Playground: "Honor Roll" (2013)

== Video game appearances ==
Gallant is a playable character in the Electronic Arts video games Skate, Skate 2 and Skate 3.
