= Skate (series) =

- Genre: Extreme sports game
- Developers: EA Black Box; EA Montreal; Exient Entertainment; Full Circle
- Publisher: Electronic Arts
- Platforms: PlayStation 3, PlayStation 4, PlayStation 5, Xbox 360, Xbox One, Xbox X/S, mobile phone, Wii, Nintendo DS, PC, iOS
- First release: Skate; September 13, 2007
- Latest release: Skate; September 16, 2025

Skate (stylized as skate.) is a series of extreme sports games primarily developed and published by Electronic Arts. The first three mainline games in the series were developed by EA Black Box. After EA Black Box was shut down in 2013, the franchise was put on hiatus until the announcement of a fourth entry in the series in 2020.

== Overview ==
The Skate series distinguishes itself from other skateboarding video games with its unique control system, called "Flick-it", in which players execute tricks with brief, rapid movements of either or both analog sticks of a twin-stick gamepad. Players assume the role of a customizable skater and freely explore a fictional city in an open world setting, completing diverse and increasingly difficult challenges while being filmed by cameraman Giovanni Reda to unlock new areas, obtain new cosmetics and eventually rise to stardom. Along the way, they can encounter, compete with and even play as famous real-life skaters, including Danny Way, Terry Kennedy and Rob Dyrdek, and must eventually choose from among several authentic licensed skateboard gear firms to strike an endorsement with for exclusive skateboard parts and gear. Players can make use of session markers to quickly travel to or return to a location of their choosing. A special injury system called the "Hall of Meat" tracks injuries sustained during wipeouts, particularly broken bones, which is key to completing certain challenges.

== Games ==
Release timeline
2007	Skate
2008	Skate It
2009	Skate 2
2010	Skate 3
2011
2012
2013
2014
2015
2016
2017
2018
2019
2020
2021
2022
2023
2024
2025	Skate

The Skate series began during the seventh generation of video game consoles, with three major installments released on Xbox 360, PlayStation 3, and one spin-off released on that generation's Nintendo platforms, leveraging their motion controls to implement the series' signature "Flick-it" controls. All of these four games were released annually towards the end of the 2000s, before the series went on hiatus.

=== Skate (2007) ===
The first game in the Skate series was released in 2007 on PlayStation 3, Xbox 360 and mobile phones. It is set in the fictional city of San Vanelona, a combination of San Francisco, Vancouver and Barcelona and follows the journey of an ordinary skater rising to fame after a devastating accident.

=== Skate It ===
Released in 2008, this spin-off, targeting the Wii, Nintendo DS and iOS, takes advantage of their motion controls to implement the series' "Flick-it" control system and is also set between Skate and the then-upcoming Skate 2. An earthquake severely damages San Vanelona and a new person skates through the ruins of the city to gain fame, before traveling to other real-life cities in Europe, China and Brazil to prove their skills.

=== Skate 2 ===
The sequel to Skate, released in 2009, in which the main protagonist is freed from jail after the earthquake shaken San Vanelona is rebuilt by MongoCorp into a new city where skateboarding is illegal. They must once again develop mastery of skating while evading authorities determined to crack down on such activity.

=== Skate 3 ===
The third installment of Skate was released in 2010 as a major departure from prior installments with its new setting in the city of Port Carverton and an unprecedented increase of freedom. The player must once again skate to stardom after a dangerous stunt in the city goes wrong, costing them a lucrative endorsement deal.

=== Skate (2025) ===
Over a decade after the release of Skate 3, Electronic Arts announced that a fourth installment of Skate was in development. EA established Full Circle, a new studio in Burnaby, British Columbia, to lead its development. The studio is led by Daniel McCulloch, and includes Deran Chung and Cuz Parry, who had created the original Skate games. In late August 2021, Electronic Arts confirmed that the game will at least be available on Microsoft Windows for the first time ever in the series' history, and will also target unspecified PlayStation and Xbox consoles, as well as mobile platforms. In July 2022, the game was announced as Skate, stylized as skate. as the original game. The new Skate is a free-to-play title, and is set in a new city known as San Vansterdam. The game was released in early access on September 16, 2025.

== Skaters ==
The below table includes all playable professional skateboarders from the main series of games. It does not include playable fictional characters, playable characters based on real people who are not professional skateboarders, such as Big Black, or former professional skateboarder Jason Lee who portrays Coach Frank, a playable character appearing only in Skate 3.

Pro skater	Skate	Skate 2	Skate 3
Ali Boulala	Yes	No	No
Dennis Busenitz	Yes	Yes	Yes
Mike Carroll	Yes	Yes	Yes
Alex Chalmers	Yes	Yes	No
Chris Cole	Yes	Yes	Yes
Jason Dill	Yes	Yes	Yes
Pat Duffy	Yes	Yes	Yes
Rob Dyrdek	Yes	Yes	Yes
Ryan Gallant	Yes	Yes	Yes
Mark Gonzales	Yes	No	No
Chris Haslam	Yes	Yes	Yes
Jerry Hsu	Yes	Yes	Yes
Terry Kennedy	Yes	Yes	Yes
P. J. Ladd	Yes	Yes	Yes
Colin McKay	Yes	Yes	Yes
John Rattray	Yes	Yes	Yes
Paul Rodriguez	Yes	No	No
Ryan Smith	Yes	Yes	No
Danny Way	Yes	Yes	Yes
Mark Appleyard	No	Yes	Yes
Ray Barbee	No	Yes	Yes
Jake Brown	No	Yes	No
John Cardiel	No	Yes	Yes
Marc Johnson	No	Yes	No
Eric Koston	No	Yes	Yes
Darren Navarrette	No	Yes	Yes
Lucas Puig	No	Yes	Yes
Braydon Szafranski	No	Yes	Yes
Joey Brezinski	No	No	Yes
Dan Drehobl	No	No	Yes
Benny Fairfax	No	No	Yes
Josh Kalis	No	No	Yes
Lizard King	No	No	Yes
Andrew Reynolds	No	No	Yes
Total	19	25	27
