= Nyjah Huston =

American skateboarder (born 1994)

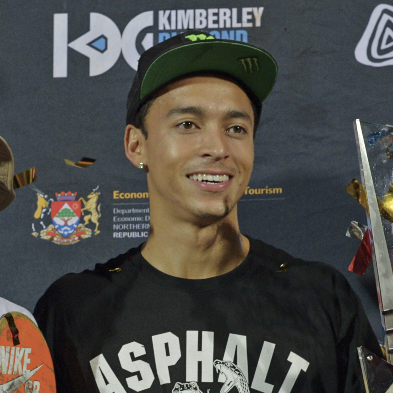
- Huston in 2015

Personal information
- Full name: Nyjah Imani Huston
- Born: November 30, 1994 (age 31) Davis, California, U.S.
- Occupation: Skateboarder
- Years active: 2000–present
- Height: 5 ft 10 in (178 cm)
- Weight: 165 lb (75 kg)

Sport
- Country: United States
- Sport: Skateboarding
- Position: Goofy-footed
- Rank: 6th
- Turned pro: 2005

Achievements and titles
- Olympic finals: 3rd (2024)
Medal record
Men's street skateboarding
Representing the United States
Olympic Games
Bronze medal – third place	2024 Paris	Street
World Championships
Gold medal – first place	2010 Arizona	Street
Gold medal – first place	2012 Newark	Street
Gold medal – first place	2014 Newark	Street
Gold medal – first place	2017 Los Angeles	Street
Gold medal – first place	2018 Rio de Janeiro	Street
Gold medal – first place	2019 São Paulo	Street
Gold medal – first place	2024 São Paulo	Street
Silver medal – second place	2011 Newark	Street
Silver medal – second place	2013 Newark	Street
Silver medal – second place	2015 Chicago	Street
Silver medal – second place	2016 Los Angeles	Street
Silver medal – second place	2020 Rome	Street
Summer X Games
Gold medal – first place	2011 Los Angeles	Street
Gold medal – first place	2012 Los Angeles	Real Street
Gold medal – first place	2013 Los Angeles	Street
Gold medal – first place	2013 Barcelona	Street
Gold medal – first place	2013 Foz do Iguaçu	Street
Gold medal – first place	2014 Austin	Street
Gold medal – first place	2015 Austin	Street
Gold medal – first place	2016 Oslo	Street
Gold medal – first place	2018 Minneapolis	Street
Gold medal – first place	2018 Sydney	Street
Gold medal – first place	2019 Shanghai	Street
Gold medal – first place	2019 Minneapolis	Street Best Trick
Gold medal – first place	2024 Ventura	Street Best Trick
Silver medal – second place	2009 Los Angeles	Street
Silver medal – second place	2010 Los Angeles	Street
Silver medal – second place	2016 Austin	Street
Silver medal – second place	2019 Minneapolis	Street
Bronze medal – third place	2012 Los Angeles	Street
Bronze medal – third place	2017 Minneapolis	Street
Bronze medal – third place	2023 California	Street Best Trick

Nyjah Imani Huston (/ˈnaɪʒə ˈhjuːstən/ NYE-zhə HEW-stən; born November 30, 1994) is an American professional skateboarder. With numerous sponsorships and competition prize winnings, Huston is one of the highest paid skateboarders in the world. Huston won gold medals at the SLS Super Crown World Championship in 2010, 2012, 2014, 2017, 2019, and 2024, and has won 15 gold medals at the X Games since 2011. Huston won his first Olympic medal, a bronze, in the 2024 Olympic men's street event at the 2024 Summer Olympics in Paris, France.

Nyjah is commonly regarded as one of the greatest skateboarders of all time. He is also widely regarded as the greatest contest street skateboarder of all time.

== Early life ==
Huston was born in Davis, California. Raised in a strict Rastafarian lifestyle by his father Adeyemi, Huston and his siblings were vegans and were homeschooled by their mother Kelle. Adeyemi was a skateboarder and made his son start skating when Nyjah was only five years old. Huston had stated that his father was very controlling and wanted Nyjah to skate every day. In 2004, his parents purchased an indoor skate park in nearby Woodland, California, to allow Huston more practice time. In 2006, his father abruptly decided to move to Puerto Rico with his family, causing problems with Huston's board sponsor Element Skateboards because he was unable to participate in demos. While in Puerto Rico, Huston's parents separated and his mother moved back to California with Nyjah's siblings. Because Adeyemi was his manager and videographer at the time, Huston stayed with his father in Puerto Rico and did not see his mother for a year. When Kelle was granted full custody upon divorcing Adeyemi, Huston moved back to live with his mother and siblings.

== Skateboarding career ==
Huston first garnered attention when he signed a sponsorship deal with Element Skateboards and joined their team following his first ever street contest win at the 2005 Tampa Am. During his debut era with the company, Huston appeared in numerous Element video productions, such as both volumes of the Elementality series, and competed in high-profile contests, such as the Dew tour and the Vans Downtown Showdown. However, Huston eventually launched his own skateboard deck company, I&I, in 2009.

Between 2010 and 2020 Huston finished in the top 2 of the Street Skateboarding World Championships every year, winning 6 gold medals and 4 silver medals in this time. He has also seen much success in the street classification at the X Games, in which he has won 12 gold medals since 2011. In addition to his competitive success, Huston is also known for his technical ability and style on a skateboard.

Aside from his success in competition, Huston has also been featured in several popular skateboarding videos, including his own video parts in the series "Elementality" and "Rise and Shine". He has also collaborated with several major skateboarding brands, including Element Skateboards, Nike SB, and DC Shoes.

I&I was a short-lived company and operated for approximately two years with a team that consisted of Huston, Richard Jefferson, and Anthony Williams. During the period of the company's existence, a number of magazine advertisements were published and an online promotional video that featured the three team members was released. The primary aesthetic influence of the brand was Rastafari and the I&I logo incorporated the pan-African colors of red, yellow, and green.

Following the closure of I&I, Huston returned to Element and released a solo video production entitled Rise & Shine in 2011—the video was available for purchase on the iTunes website and later received the "Best Video Part" award from the Transworld Skateboarding magazine. During this stage of Huston's career, the skateboarder also joined the DC Shoes company as a team rider, following a significant period of time without a shoe sponsor—an unusual occurrence for a professional skateboarder with the degree of exposure that Huston had attracted. In response to the DC Shoes announcement, Huston explained that "I think it was all a buildup of things over the past year. DC has always been my top choice for a shoe sponsor but I think it took this past year for them to see what I've accomplished and how I did in the contests and my video part and all that for it to finally come through."

Following Huston's decision to skateboard for DC Shoes, other DC team riders expressed their perspectives in online promotional material produced by the shoe company. Long-term DC team rider Josh Kalis stated in the introductory video for Huston (also featuring Mike Mo Capaldi), "And then there's this other dude out there, literally buying shoes from a skate shop. He could get shoes from anybody that he wanted, but he was buying DCs." Capaldi expressed his opinion on Huston in the same video, stating his belief that Huston is "probably the best skateboarder I've ever seen—he does everything in, like, two tries."

After Huston's gold medal victory at the 2013 X Games Street League contest in Barcelona, Spain in mid-May, Transworld SKATEboarding magazine announced that no other skateboarder has won a greater amount of prize money. On the final night of May 2013, the DC Shoes Co. held a launch event for the first signature model skate shoe of Huston's career at the Roosevelt Hotel in Los Angeles, California, U.S., with Pete Rock in the role of DJ. The model is named the "Nyjah Huston Signature Shoe" and the promotional advertisement features Huston executing a trick at set of stairs at Hollywood High School in Los Angeles, U.S.

An announcement on June 25, 2013, revealed that, due to a rib injury, Huston was unable to compete in the Street League contest at the Munich X Games in late June 2013. Huston's mother Kelle Huston reported that her son "bruised and scraped the right side of his torso" in a skateboarding accident, but an article from the Street League website stated that Huston would be fit to compete in the next contest round in July 2013 in Portland, Oregon. Also in 2013, Huston made a statement to Thrasher Magazine in which he questioned the appropriateness of female skateboarders. He later apologized for his remarks.

Huston was added to the competition lineup for the 2013 Kimberley Diamond Cup in South Africa, held from September 28 to 29. Huston won the Kimberley Diamond Cup and the one million rand cash prize.

Huston qualified for the United States Olympic Team in the Street Skateboarding discipline for the 2020 Tokyo Olympics - the first year for skateboarding at the Olympics. He qualified for the Olympic final out of his heat (heat 3), but did not win any medal. After high scores in his runs and landing the first of five best trick attempts, Huston subsequently fell four times in a row to finish seventh. In his return at the 2024 Paris Olympics, Huston managed to get the bronze.

=== Sponsorship ===
As of January 2021, Huston is sponsored by Nike SB, Diamond Supply Co., Ricta Wheels, Thrasher Magazine, Monster Energy, SoWellCBD.fr, Doritos, Mob Grip, Mountain Dew, flatbread Neapolitan pizzeria, Urban Plates and Adapt Technology. As of January 2021, Nyjah Huston stated via social media that he is no longer with Element Skateboards. In June 2021, Huston launched his own skateboard brand, Disorder Skateboards.

== Awards ==
Huston won the inaugural "Kentucky Unbridled Spirit Award for Action Sports" in 2006.

At Transworld SKATEboarding magazine's 2012 awards event, Huston's performance was given the headline "Nyjah Huston Cleans Up at Annual Transworld Skate Awards" by the Yahoo! Sports website. Huston won three awards at the event: "Best Video Part" (for Huston's Rise & Shine video release), "New Era Readers' Choice" (the only award chosen solely by the readers of the magazine and Transworld website), and "Best Street".

Huston has been nominated several times for Thrasher Magazine’s prestigious "Skater Of The Year" (SOTY) award.

== Video game appearances ==
Huston is a featured character in the video games Tony Hawk's Project 8, Tony Hawk's Proving Ground, Tony Hawk: Ride, Tony Hawk's Pro Skater HD, and Tony Hawk's Pro Skater 5.

Huston also appears in Tony Hawk's Pro Skater 1 + 2, a remake of both Tony Hawk's Pro Skater 1 and Tony Hawk's Pro Skater 2 by Vicarious Visions, released in September 2020. Huston also appeared in Tony Hawk's Pro Skater 3 + 4, a remake of both Tony Hawk's Pro Skater 3 and Tony Hawk's Pro Skater 4 by Iron Galaxy, which was released on July 11, 2025.

In July 2020 Huston collaborated with Play'n GO to develop his own branded game Nyjah Huston Skate for Gold. It is one of the first skateboarding-themed games to be released by the online gambling industry.

== Philanthropy ==
In 2008, Huston and his mother Kelle founded the charity organization Let It Flow, which aimed to provide clean, safe, and accessible water to communities in need. Following their personal experiences in Puerto Rico, the pair started by selling reusable water bottles at a local farmers market and, as of December 2012, the organization builds clean-water wells, fixes wells that are inoperable, and builds sanitation stations for people in urgent need of clean water. Let It Flow built its first sanitation station in Ethiopia. As of August 2024, Let It Flow appears to no longer be active.

== Personal life ==
=== Family ===
Following his return to Element, Huston revealed that his father's controlling behavior had led to estrangement, further explaining that his father refused to return video footage of Huston's skateboarding following the separation. He no longer adheres to a strict Rastafarian lifestyle and cut off his dreadlocks. He identifies hip hop as his favorite musical genre to listen to.

=== Legal issues ===
In 2017, Huston was arrested for assaulting a man at a party and was sentenced to 24 months probation after pleading no contest to one misdemeanour count of disturbing the peace. In 2022, Huston was sued for allegedly assaulting a man in an altercation; Huston countersued, claiming he was assaulted.

=== Residence ===
As of December 2019, Huston lives in Laguna Beach, California.

== Competition history ==
Year	Competition	Venue	Rank	Event	Notes
2004	Damn Am	Costa Mesa, California	4	Street	—N/a
2004	Damn Am	Costa Mesa, California	3rd place, bronze medalist(s)	Best Trick	Small Rail
2004	Damn Am	Costa Mesa, California	3rd place, bronze medalist(s)	Best Trick	Big Rail
2005	Tampa Am	Tampa, Florida	1st place, gold medalist(s)	Street	—N/a
2005	K.R.3.A.M. Am	San Juan, Puerto Rico	1st place, gold medalist(s)	Street	—N/a
2005	West 49 Canadian Open	Toronto, Ontario	4	Street	—N/a
2006	Global Assault	Melbourne, Australia	2nd place, silver medalist(s)	Street	—N/a
2006	Dew Action Sports Tour Right Guard Open	Denver, Colorado	2nd place, silver medalist(s)	Park	—N/a
2006	Dew Action Sports Tour Panasonic Open	Louisville, Kentucky	2nd place, silver medalist(s)	Park	—N/a
2006	Dew Action Sports Tour Vans Invitational	Portland, Oregon	4	Street	—N/a
2006	X Games XII	Los Angeles, California	8	Street	—N/a
2006	Vans Downtown Showdown	Los Angeles, California	2nd place, silver medalist(s)	Best Trick	Stair
2007	éS Game of SKATE	San Diego, California	2nd place, silver medalist(s)	Street	—N/a
2007	etnies Goofy vs Regular	Lake Forest, California	2nd place, silver medalist(s)	Street	Goofy Team
2007	X Games XIII	Los Angeles, California	11	Street	—N/a
2008	Maloof Money Cup	Costa Mesa, California	2nd place, silver medalist(s)	Street	—N/a
2008	X Games XIV	Los Angeles, California	8	Street	—N/a
2009	Maloof Money Cup	Costa Mesa, California	3rd place, bronze medalist(s)	Street	—N/a
2009	X Games XV	Los Angeles, California	2nd place, silver medalist(s)	Street	—N/a
2010	Tampa Pro	Tampa, Florida	2nd place, silver medalist(s)	Street	—N/a
2010	Maloof Money Cup	Costa Mesa, California	2nd place, silver medalist(s)	Street	—N/a
2010	SLS World Tour	Glendale, Arizona	1st place, gold medalist(s)	Street	—N/a
2010	SLS World Tour	Ontario, California	3rd place, bronze medalist(s)	Street	—N/a
2010	SLS World Tour	Las Vegas, Nevada	3rd place, bronze medalist(s)	Street	—N/a
2010	X Games XVI	Los Angeles, California	2nd place, silver medalist(s)	Street	—N/a
2011	Tampa Pro	Tampa, Florida	2nd place, silver medalist(s)	Street	—N/a
2011	SLS World Tour	Seattle, Washington	1st place, gold medalist(s)	Street	—N/a
2011	SLS World Tour	Kansas City, Missouri	1st place, gold medalist(s)	Street	—N/a
2011	SLS World Tour	Glendale, Arizona	1st place, gold medalist(s)	Street	—N/a
2011	SLS Championship	Newark, New Jersey	2nd place, silver medalist(s)	Street	—N/a
2011	X Games XVII	Los Angeles, California	1st place, gold medalist(s)	Street	—N/a
2012	SLS World Tour	Kansas City, Missouri	1st place, gold medalist(s)	Street	—N/a
2012	SLS World Tour	Ontario, California	1st place, gold medalist(s)	Street	—N/a
2012	SLS World Tour	Glendale, Arizona	4	Street	—N/a
2012	SLS Championship	Newark, New Jersey	1st place, gold medalist(s)	Street	—N/a
2012	X Games XVIII	Los Angeles, California	3rd place, bronze medalist(s)	Street	—N/a
2013	Tampa Pro	Tampa, Florida	2nd place, silver medalist(s)	Street	—N/a
2013	Tampa Pro	Tampa, Florida	1st place, gold medalist(s)	Best Trick	—N/a
2013	X Games Foz do Iguaçu 2013	Foz do Iguaçu, Brazil	1st place, gold medalist(s)	Street	—N/a
2013	X Games Barcelona 2013	Barcelona, Spain	1st place, gold medalist(s)	Street	—N/a
2013	X Games Los Angeles 2013	Los Angeles, California	1st place, gold medalist(s)	Street	—N/a
2013	SLS World Tour	Kansas City, Missouri	1st place, gold medalist(s)	Street	—N/a
2013	SLS World Tour	Portland, Oregon	8	Street	—N/a
2013	SLS World Tour	Los Angeles, California	1st place, gold medalist(s)	Street	—N/a
2013	SLS Super Crown Championship	Newark, New Jersey	2nd place, silver medalist(s)	Street	—N/a
2013	Kimberley Diamond Cup	Kimberley, South Africa	1st place, gold medalist(s)	Street	—N/a
2014	Tampa Pro	Tampa, Florida	1st place, gold medalist(s)	Street	—N/a
2014	SLS Pro Open	Los Angeles, California	1st place, gold medalist(s)	Street	—N/a
2014	X Games Austin 2014	Austin, Texas	1st place, gold medalist(s)	Street	—N/a
2014	SLS Nike SB World Tour	Chicago, Illinois	1st place, gold medalist(s)	Street	—N/a
2014	SLS Nike SB World Tour	Los Angeles, California	1st place, gold medalist(s)	Street	—N/a
2014	SLS Super Crown World Championship	Newark, New Jersey	1st place, gold medalist(s)	Street	—N/a
2015	Tampa Pro	Tampa, Florida	2nd place, silver medalist(s)	Street	—N/a
2015	SLS Pro Open	Barcelona, Spain	1st place, gold medalist(s)	Street	—N/a
2015	X Games Austin 2015	Austin, Texas	1st place, gold medalist(s)	Street	—N/a
2015	SLS World Tour	Los Angeles, California	2nd place, silver medalist(s)	Street	—N/a
2015	SLS World Tour	Newark, New Jersey	2nd place, silver medalist(s)	Street	—N/a
2015	SLS Super Crown World Championship	Chicago, Illinois	2nd place, silver medalist(s)	Street	—N/a
2015	Kimberley Diamond Cup	Kimberley, South Africa	1st place, gold medalist(s)	Street	—N/a
2016	Tampa Pro	Tampa, Florida	4	Street	—N/a
2016	X Games Oslo 2016	Oslo, Norway	1st place, gold medalist(s)	Street	—N/a
2016	Red Bull Hart Lines	Detroit, Michigan	1st place, gold medalist(s)	Street	—N/a
2016	SLS Pro Open	Barcelona, Spain	2nd place, silver medalist(s)	Street	—N/a
2016	X Games Austin 2016	Austin, Texas	2nd place, silver medalist(s)	Street	—N/a
2016	SLS World Tour	Munich, Germany	3rd place, bronze medalist(s)	Street	—N/a
2016	SLS World Tour	Newark, New Jersey	1st place, gold medalist(s)	Street	—N/a
2016	SLS Super Crown World Championship	Los Angeles, California	2nd place, silver medalist(s)	Street	—N/a
2017	Tampa Pro	Tampa, Florida	5	Street	—N/a
2017	Red Bull Hart Lines	Detroit, Michigan	1st place, gold medalist(s)	Street	—N/a
2017	SLS Pro Open	Barcelona, Spain	1st place, gold medalist(s)	Street	—N/a
2017	Dew Tour	Long Beach, California	2nd place, silver medalist(s)	Street	—N/a
2017	SLS World Tour	Munich, Germany	1st place, gold medalist(s)	Street	—N/a
2017	SLS World Tour	Chicago, Illinois	4	Street	—N/a
2017	SLS Super Crown World Championship	Los Angeles, California	1st place, gold medalist(s)	Street	—N/a
2017	X Games Minneapolis 2017	Minneapolis, Minnesota	3rd place, bronze medalist(s)	Street	—N/a
2018	SLS Pro Open	Los Angeles, California	4	Street	—N/a
2018	SLS Pro Open	Huntington Beach, California	7	Street	—N/a
2018	X Games Minneapolis 2018	Minneapolis, Minnesota	1st place, gold medalist(s)	Street	—N/a
2018	X Games Sydney 2018	Sydney, Australia	1st place, gold medalist(s)	Street	—N/a
2018	SLS World Championship	Rio de Janeiro, Brazil	1st place, gold medalist(s)	Street	—N/a
2019	X Games Shanghai 2019	Shanghai, China	1st place, gold medalist(s)	Street	—N/a
2019	Dew Tour	Long Beach, California	7	Street	—N/a
2019	SLS Pro Tour	Los Angeles, California	8	Street	—N/a
2019	X Games Minneapolis 2019	Minneapolis, Minnesota	2nd place, silver medalist(s)	Street	—N/a
2019	X Games Minneapolis 2019	Minneapolis, Minnesota	1st place, gold medalist(s)	Street Best Trick	—N/a
2019	SLS World Tour	London, United Kingdom	1st place, gold medalist(s)	Street	—N/a
2019	SLS World Championship	São Paulo, Brazil	1st place, gold medalist(s)	Street	—N/a
2021	Dew Tour	Des Moines, Iowa	1st place, gold medalist(s)	Street	Olympics qualifier
2021	Street Skateboarding World Championships	Rome, Italy	2nd place, silver medalist(s)	Street	Olympics qualifier
2021	Summer Olympics	Tokyo, Japan	7	Street	—N/a
2021	SLS Championship Tour	Salt Lake City, Utah	2nd place, silver medalist(s)	Street	—N/a
2021	SLS Championship Tour	Lake Havasu, Arizona	1st place, gold medalist(s)	Street	—N/a
2021	SLS Super Crown World Championships	Jacksonville, Florida	1st place, gold medalist(s)	Street	—N/a
2022	Tampa Pro	Tampa, Florida	5	Street	—N/a
2022	X Games Southern California 2022	Southern California	2nd place, silver medalist(s)	Street Best Trick	—N/a
2022	X Games Southern California 2022	Southern California	5	Street	—N/a
2022	X Games Southern California 2022	Southern California	10	Real Street Best Trick	—N/a
2022	Street Skateboarding World Championships	Rome, Italy	1st place, gold medalist(s)	Street	—N/a
2023	Tampa Pro	Tampa, Florida	9	Street	—N/a
2023	X Games California 2023	Southern California	4	Street	—N/a
2023	X Games California 2023	Southern California	3rd place, bronze medalist(s)	Street Best Trick	—N/a
2024	X Games Ventura 2024	Ventura, California	1st place, gold medalist(s)	Street	—N/a
2024	X Games Ventura 2024	Ventura, California	1st place, gold medalist(s)	Street Best Trick	—N/a
2024	Summer Olympics	Paris, France	3rd place, bronze medalist(s)	Street	—N/a

== Videography ==
- Element Kids: Tricks (2005)
- Element: Elementality Volume 1 (2005)
- Element: Brent Atchley Pro Debut Video (2006)
- Globe: The Global Assault (2006)
- Element: Elementality Volume 2 (2006)
- eS: eSpecial (2007)
- Element: This Is My Element (2007)
- Silver: Silver In Barcelona (2008)
- Thrasher: Double Rock (2009)
- Element: Rise & Shine (2011)
- Rap Video by The Game (featuring Chris Brown, Tyga, Wiz Khalifa, Lil Wayne): Celebration (2012)
- Cameo Kid Ink ft. Chris Brown - "Show Me" (2014)
- DC Shoes: Nyjah - Fade to Black (2014)
- Thrasher: OMFG (2015)
- Most Expensivest: "Snacks on Snacks on Snacks" 2 Chaniz ft. Nyjah Huston (2018)
- Thrasher: "King of The Road" - Season 3 (2018)
- Nike: Til Death (2018)
- Monster Energy: NYJAH HUSTON | Aspire - Inspire: Ep 05 (2021)
- Savage Fenty Show Vol.3 (2021)
- Disorder Skateboards' "DISRUPTION" Video (2022)
- Monster Euro Tour – Episode 1 (2022)
- Disorder Skateboards: Shine On (2022)
- Nike: Need That (2022)

Awards and achievements
Preceded by (United States) Shaun White	Best Male Action Sports Athlete ESPY Award; 2013, 2014	Succeeded by (United States) Ryan Dungey
