= Jennifer Goodridge =

American entertainer

Jennifer Goodridge Cruz
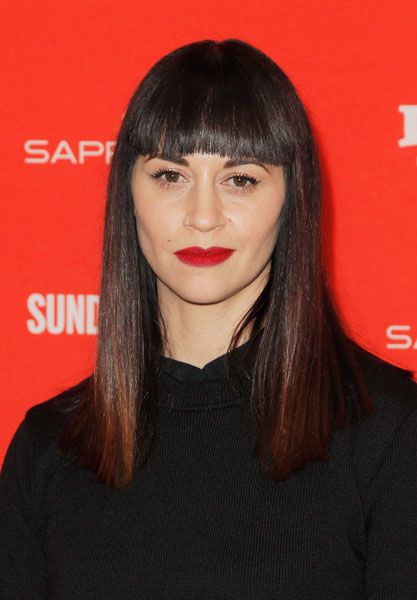
- Goodridge Cruz in 2018
- Born: San Diego, California, U.S.
- Occupations: Film producer, writer, director, musician
- Years active: 1996–present
- Spouse: Jordan Asher Cruz (m. 2022)
- Children: 1
- Website: www.beyondideas.productions

Jennifer Goodridge Cruz is an American film and television producer, writer, director, and musician. She has produced notable works for Netflix, The Disney Channel, and YouTube Red as well as many commercials and music videos. Her films have premiered at The Sundance Film Festival, L'Étrange Festival, HollyShorts Film Festival, Sidewalk Film Festival among others. She was a guest panel speaker at Slamdance Film Festival in 2018 for the polytechnic series, Life As A Truly Independent Filmmaker: Survival guide and is a member of the Producers Guild of America.

== Early life ==
Born in San Diego, California, Goodridge Cruz started her creative career early. At age five, she attended the Jimmie DeFore Dance Center in Costa Mesa, where she studied acting, singing, and dance. At 11 years of age, Goodridge Cruz was the only child student accepted into adult classes. The same year, she landed her first professional dance role in the Joffrey Ballet's rendition of The Nutcracker which premiered at the Dorothy Chandler Pavilion.

== Career ==
=== Commercials and Music Videos ===
In 2010, prior to her independent producer career, Goodridge Cruz served as a Commercial Directors Representative under Siobhan McCafferty & Associates. Goodridge Cruz went on to work at Bob Industries and began her career as a producer. While working at Bob Industries, Goodridge Cruz collaborated on many award-winning commercials and music videos with directors Jonathan Dayton and Valerie Faris, Davis Guggenheim, Bob Odenkirk, Jason Reitman, Miguel Arteta, Doug Pray, Trish Sie, among others.

In March 2015, Goodridge Cruz departed Bob Industries to launch her own production company, Beyond Ideas, where she began to produce music videos for Beck, X Ambassadors, Tim Heidecker, Lindsey Stirling, PartyNextDoor, Father John Misty, She & Him, Melanie Martinez, Fitz and the Tantrums, Jade Bird, George Ezra, among others. She has produced commercials for Tommy Hilfiger, Burger King, Converse, YouTube Music featuring Camila Cabello and Dua Lipa, as well as the Twitch commercial campaign starring Eric Andre.

=== Acting/Radio Host/Music ===
Simultaneously to her career as a producer, Goodridge Cruz has participated in acting, hosting, and is a musician.

Goodridge Cruz appeared in Michel Gondry's music video "Everlong" for the Foo Fighters, followed by a role as Sophia Coppola's sister in the Spike Jonze directed video for The Chemical Brothers' "Elektrobank".

She became a permanent fixture on Jeremy Weiss and Aaron Farley's Killradio show Get The Fuck Up Radio after fans loved her guest performance as "Jentern" (Jennifer the intern).

In 2004 she joined the post hardcore band Your Enemies Friends as keyboardist and backup vocalist. Goodridge Cruz and bandmate Ronnie Washburn later formed shoegaze band Seaspin, putting out the EP Reverser in 2010 under Buddyhead Records.

In 2015, Goodridge Cruz formed Sister Mystery. Together, they released a limited edition self-titled cassette as well as recorded a cover of The Smiths' "Last Night I Dreamt That Somebody Loved Me" for A Dreaded Sunny Day – A Tribute to The Smiths. In 2015, Sister Mystery released a split 7" with Invsn which is frontman Dennis Lyxzen of Refused and Fake Names. Sister Mystery's song "A Propelling Force" was later remixed by The Cure keyboardist Roger O'Donnell and released on Spotify.

Goodridge Cruz provided background vocals on Blaqk Audio's album CexCells, on the song "Again, Again, and Again". She also provides background vocals for Refused songs "Dawkins Christ" and "Useless Europeans", from their 2015 album Freedom.

=== Film and television ===
At the helm of her production company Beyond Ideas, Goodridge Cruz has executive produced and produced a variety of content including narrative and documentaries.

She received recognition for her production of I'm Poppy, a surreal comedy on singer and YouTuber Poppy. I'm Poppy received critical acclaim when it premiered at The Sundance Film Festival 2018 and is now exclusively available upon YouTube Red.

In 2019, Goodridge Cruz line-produced season one of The Disney Channel's "Shook", in association with the Duplass brothers's production company DBP Donut. "Shook" was Emmy nominated for "Outstanding Young Adult Program" at the 47th Daytime Emmy Awards 2020.

Goodridge Cruz produced a documentary for Adidas on their first female skateboarder to go professional, Nora Vasconcellos, directed by Giovanni Reda.

She also produced eight episodes of Stranger Things: Spotlight for Netflix.

Goodridge Cruz went on to co-produce feature film The Argument, directed by Robert Schwartzman and starring Dan Fogler, Emma Bell, Cleopatra Coleman, Danny Pudi, Tyler James Williams and Maggie Q, which was released September 4, 2020.

She also produced Blake, written and directed by Brendan Sexton III which premiered at the LA Shorts Film Festival and stars Perrey Reeves, Riley Keough and Brendan Sexton III.

Goodridge Cruz is Executive Producer of writer director Hannah Peterson's film CHAMP which will premiere at The Sundance Film Festival, January 2022. CHAMP was produced at Goodridge's production company, Beyond Ideas, by Producers Taylor Shung & Alex Coco of Nomadland. Peterson and Goodridge previously collaborated on The Disney Channel's "Shook".

Goodridge Cruz wrote, directed and produced along with Jordan Asher Cruz for their production company 13Lux Films, animated short film No Future Here which premiered at HollyShorts Film Festival on September 24, 2021, in Los Angeles, CA at the Grauman's Chinese Theatre. No Future Here features voices by Cleopatra Coleman of The Last Man on Earth, Frankie Loyal of Mayans M.C. and Justin Warfield of She Wants Revenge. No Future Here is also an official selection at Sidewalk Film Festival playing in Birmingham, Alabama on September 29, 2021, New York Shorts International Film Festival at Village Cinema in New York City, Montreal International Animation Film Festival on January 2, 2022, Cinequest Film & VR Festival, and Bowery Film Festival on November 16, 2022.

In 2024, Goodridge Cruz co-produced Gia Coppola's film The Last Showgirl, starring Pamela Anderson, Brenda Song, Kiernan Shipka, Dave Bautista and Jamie Lee Curtis. The film premiered at Toronto International Film Festival to overwhelmingly positive reviews. The film would go on to pick up two Golden Globe nominations.
