= Nora Vasconcellos =

American skateboarder

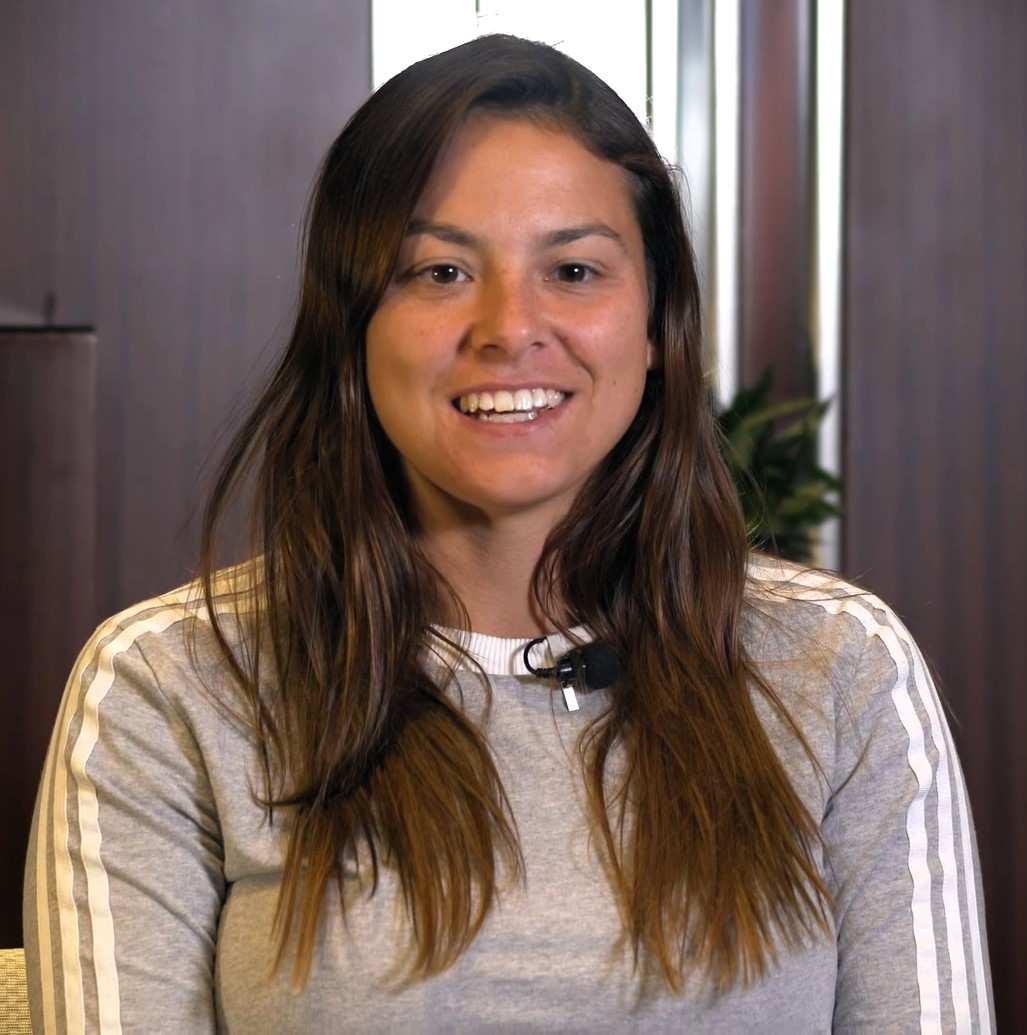
- Vasconcellos in 2017

Personal information
- Born: 1992 (age 33–34) Pembroke, Massachusetts, U.S.

Sport
- Country: United States
- Sport: Skateboarding
Medal record
Women's park skateboarding
Representing the United States
World Championships
Gold medal – first place	2017 Shanghai	Park

Nora Vasconcellos (born November 29, 1992) is an American professional skateboarder. She is currently signed with Adidas skateboarding and was the first female skateboarder signed to Adidas. Her other sponsors include Welcome, JuneShine, Yeti, Hume Supernatural, Stance, CCS, Krux, Bronson, OJ, Mob, Nixon.

== Early life and education ==
Vasconcellos is from Pembroke, Massachusetts, and graduated from Pembroke High School.

== Skateboarding career ==
In June 2016 Vasconcellos began riding for Adidas as an amateur skater. In 2016, Vasconcellos alongside Samarria Brevard and Leo Baker were the mystery guests on Thrasher's King of the Road Season 2. Vasconcellos placed 1st in the 2017 Vans Park Series World Championships. In 2017, she turned pro for Adidas and Welcome skateboards. In 2017, Giovanni Reda directed a short film in collaboration with Adidas titled Nora, a documentary that spotlights Vasconcellos’ journey in skateboarding from childhood to present.

Thrasher listed Vasconcellos at number 4 on The Top 10 Women & Non-Binary Skaters of 2019 list. In 2019, Vasconcellos appeared in This Way, a short film featuring Nora, Laura Enever, and Jaleesa Vincent.

== Artistic endeavors ==
Vasconcellos has participated in a handful of successful professional art projects, most of them connected to her passion for skateboarding. She was involved in a creative exhibit supported by Adidas entitled Au Bout du Compte, French for "At the End of the Day," held in Galerie Bête, Paris, in which she and three fellow woman skateboarders called attention to the artistic aspects of skateboarding. One of her many self-designed and decorated skateboards was held in the Smithsonian in 2018, and she has been involved in a number of commercial designs, including one for Nixon, a luxury watch company, and one for Skullcandy, an audio equipment brand.

In April 2025, Vasconcellos was announced to be a playable character in Tony Hawk's Pro Skater 3 + 4.
