= Samarria Brevard =

American skateboarder

Personal information
- Born: Samarria Brevard; September 22, 1993 (age 32) Riverside, California, U.S.
- Height: 5 ft 6 in (1.68 m)

Sport
- Country: USA
- Sport: Skateboarding
Medal record
Silver medal – second place	2017 Minneapolis	Street

Samarria Brevard (born September 22, 1993) is a goofy-footed American skateboarder and musician.

== Skateboarding career ==
Growing up in Riverside, California, Brevard started skating at the age of 13, spending time with brothers and cousins who skated.

In 2011, Brevard took first in the Supergirl Am Jam 2011 in Venice Beach, CA. This performance earned her a place on the Hoopla Skateboards team. In 2013, Brevard placed 4th at the X Games in Los Angeles. In 2014, she placed 10th at the X Games Austin. Also in 2014, Brevard became the first African-American female skateboarder to win the Kimberly Diamond Cup Women's Street Championship in South Africa.

In 2015, Brevard placed in the top ten in the Women's Super Crown Championship at the Nike SB Street League Series Skateboarding. Brevard placed 5th at the X Games 2016. In 2016, Brevard, alongside Leo Baker and Nora Vasconcellos, were the mystery guests on Thrasher's King of the Road Season 2. In March 2017, Brevard and fellow skater Savannah Headden appeared in the music video for "Name For You", a song from The Shins album Heartworms, as they skate around in Southern California.

In July 2017, Brevard place 2nd at the X Games Minneapolis 2017 in the Women's Skateboard Street contest. In her last run, Brevard executed a Tre Flip down an eight-stair drop. Not long after her silver medal, Enjoi promoted Brevard to pro. Also in 2017, Brevard released a video part in Don't Quit Your Day Job – directed by Erik Sandoval and Monique O’Toole, the first all-female skate film in the US in over a decade, released by Transworld Skateboarding.

In 2018, Brevard released a video part in the Etnies skate video 'ALBUM.'

In 2021, Brevard participated in the 2020 Summer Olympics in Tokyo as part of the first USA Olympic skateboarding team.

== Sponsors ==
=== Current ===
Meow, MovieTickets.com, Bones, Active, etnies, Cloud 9 grip

=== Former ===
Hoopla, Enjoi
