= World Skateboarding Grand Prix =

- Sport: Competitive skateboarding
- Founded: 2013
- Founder: Tim McFerran
- Country: United States
- Website: worldskateboardinginternational.com

World Skateboarding Grand Prix (WSGP) is a skateboarding event management company based in Sacramento, California.

In 2013 and 2014, WSPG presented the Kimberley Diamond Cup World Skateboarding Championships in Kimberley, South Africa.

The events featured the largest single-event prize purses in competitive skateboarding in 2013, including $100,000 for first prize in the Street skateboarding competition.

== History ==
WSGP was founded in 2013 by Tim McFerran, who previously served as vice-president of Maloof Skateboarding and ran the Maloof Money Cup World Championships from 2008 to 2012. In December 2015, the organization announced plans to expand into South America, hosting national championship events in ten countries leading up to a Latin American Skateboarding Championships in 2017.

== Background ==
World Skateboarding Grand Prix (WSPG) is a skateboarding event management company that was founded by CEO Tim McFerran in 2013. WSGP is based in Sacramento, California.

McFerran previously served as Vice President at Maloof Skateboarding and ran the Maloof Money Cup World Championships from 2008 to 2012. In 2009, McFerran was named one of the “Hot 25” “best and brightest business professionals” in the Orange County, California region by OC METRO.

== Kimberley Diamond Cup ==
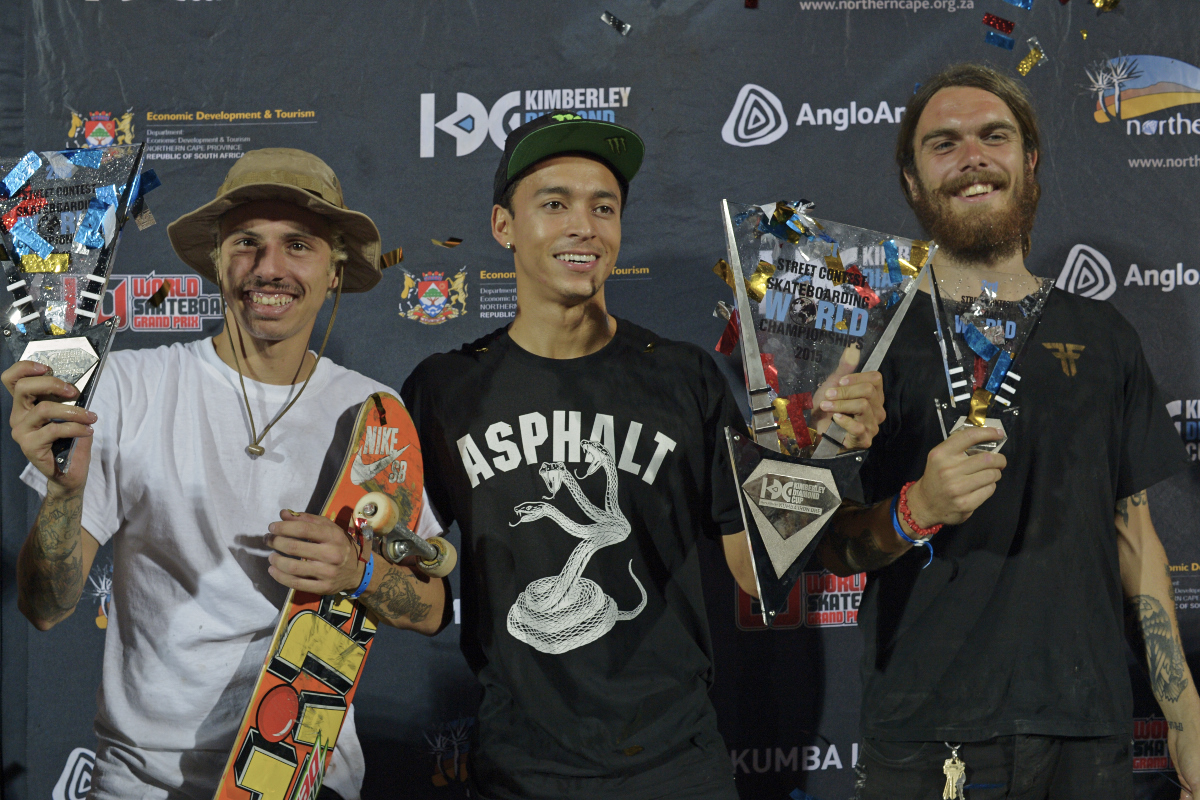
KDC 2015 Street World Championships - From left, Luan Oliveira, Brazil (2nd), Nyjah Huston, USA (1st) and JS LaPierre, Canada (3rd)

The 2013, 2014 and 2015 Kimberley Diamond Cup World Skateboarding Championships were produced by World Skateboarding Grand Prix (WSGP) and presented in partnership with the Northern Cape Provincial Government and Kumba Iron Ore, the fourth-largest iron ore producer in the world and the largest in Africa. The open skateboarding competitions were held at the Kumba Skate Plaza in Kimberley, capital of the Northern Cape Province in South Africa.

The Kimberley Diamond Cup replaced the Maloof Money Cup World Championships, held in 2011 and 2012. The event was named in homage to Kimberley’s history as the location of the first diamond mine in South Africa, and for its reputation as "The Diamond City."

Prize money for the Kimberley Diamond Cup World Skateboarding Championships was $250,000 and the total prize purse was $500,000, the largest single-event purse in skateboarding.

The Kimberley Diamond Cup events were webcast in 120 countries. SuperSport, the leading sports provider in South Africa, also broadcast the competitions.

During the summer of 2013, professional skateboarders Ryan Decenzo and Adam Dyet joined the WSGP’s Skateboarding for Hope tour in the Northern Cape Province and participated in skateboarding clinics and demonstrations in Kathu, Kuruman, Postmasburg and Kimberley.

WSGP also conducted coaching clinics throughout South Africa, gave away skateboards, and employed a full-time skateboarding coach at the Kumba Skate Plaza.

WSGP partnered with a South African project management company to deliver the Kimberley Diamond Cup.

== Rider Cup NYC ==
In 2014, WSGP produced the Rider Cup NYC team skateboarding competition in New York City. Contests were held in New York’s five boroughs and finals were conducted at Lower East Side (LES) Coleman Skatepark. Winning teams from each borough (12 total) competed to win $10k plus an all-expenses paid trip to South Africa to compete in the Rider Cup World Championships at the 2014 Kimberly Diamond Cup.

=== 2014 Rider Cup NYC Final Results ===
1. Soul Team (Brooklyn)
2. LES Bomb Squad (Manhattan)
3. Team Belief (Queens)

=== 2014 Rider Cup Team Championships at KDC ===
In October 2014, eight international 4-man teams of skateboarders competed in the Rider Cup Team Championship at KDC. The South African team 4 Staxx won the $4000 prize purse.

1. 4 Staxx, South Africa
2. Get It Get It!, South Africa
3. Clean Team, South Africa

== Turkish Skateboarding Championships ==
In August 2014, WSGP announced plans to produce a Grand Slam series of skateboarding competitions in Turkey in 2015. The events culminated in the inaugural Turkish Skateboarding Championships in Istanbul on May 31, 2015.
