= Kimberley Diamond Cup =

Kimberley Diamond Cup Skateboarding World Championships
- Venue: Kumba Skate Plaza
- Location: Kimberley, Northern Cape Province, South Africa kimberleydiamondcup.com
- Total prize money: $500,000

The Kimberley Diamond Cup was an annual skateboarding event held at the beginning of each Southern Hemisphere Spring in Kimberley, South Africa. The event featured the largest single-event prize purse in skateboarding - $100,000 for first prize in the Street competition - and is the largest skateboarding competition in Africa.

The 2015 Kimberley Diamond Cup featured skaters from more than 50 countries. In the Street World Championships final, Nyjah Huston of the U.S. edged out Luan Oliveira of Brazil to capture the $100,000 first prize.

The 2014 Kimberley Diamond Cup Skateboarding World Championships featured skaters from 37 countries. Kelvin Hoefler from Brazil placed first in the Street competition. Fellow competitor Nyjah Huston, generally regarded as "the best contest street skateboarder in the world", won the Street Competition in 2013.

Kimberley Diamond Cup championships were webcast worldwide. SuperSport, the leading sports provider in South Africa, broadcasts the event.

The Kimberley Diamond Cup replaced the Maloof Money Cup, a skateboarding event held in South Africa in 2011 and 2012.

== Background ==
In 2013, the Kimberley Diamond Cup World Skateboarding Championships replaced the Maloof Money Cup World Championships, previously held in South Africa in 2011 and 2012.

The 2013 skateboarding competition was held from September 27–29 at the Kumba Skate Plaza in Kimberley, capital of the Northern Cape Province in South Africa. The event was named in homage to the Kimberley's history as the location of the first diamond mine in South Africa, and for its reputation as "The Diamond City".

=== World Skateboarding Grand Prix ===
The 2013 and 2014 Kimberley Diamond Cup championships were produced by World Skateboarding Grand Prix (WSGP) and presented in partnership with the Northern Cape Provincial Government and Kumba Iron Ore, the fourth-largest iron ore producer in the world and the largest in Africa.

WSGP CEO Tim McFerran founded the company in 2013. McFerran previously served as vice president at Maloof Skateboarding and ran the Maloof Money Cup World Championships from 2008 to 2012. In 2009, McFerran was named one of the "Hot 25 best and brightest business professionals" in the Orange County, California region by OC Metro.

=== Community outreach ===
In 2013 and 2014, WSGP conducted skateboarding clinics throughout South Africa, given away hundreds of skateboards, and employed a full-time skateboarding mentor at the Kumba Skate Plaza.

Communities located around Kimberley Diamond Cup Sponsor Kumba Iron Ore's mines own a stake in the company and receive twice-yearly dividend payments that are used for community development projects such as clinics, schools, and infrastructure development. Kumba Iron Ore has also a stated commitment to turn South Africa Northern Cape Province into a world-class extreme sport destination.

=== Economic impact ===
In 2013, John Block, Member of the Executive Council (MEC) for Finance, Economic Development and Tourism in the Northern Cape Province of South Africa, said “hotels in Kimberley were at capacity and the flights were sold out" during the 2013 Kimberly Diamond Cup.” Patrick Seboko, head of the Northern Cape Province Department of Economic Development and Tourism, said the Kimberley Diamond Cup will help "promote the province as attractive destination for mega events, 'high octane' sports, and adventure tourism."

=== Mission ===
WSGP's stated mission is to "help stimulate local economies through tourism and support youth development, especially those in underserved or impoverished communities, through skate clinics, demos, pro tours and more."

== Kimberley Diamond Cup competition results ==
=== 2015 Kimberley Diamond Cup ===
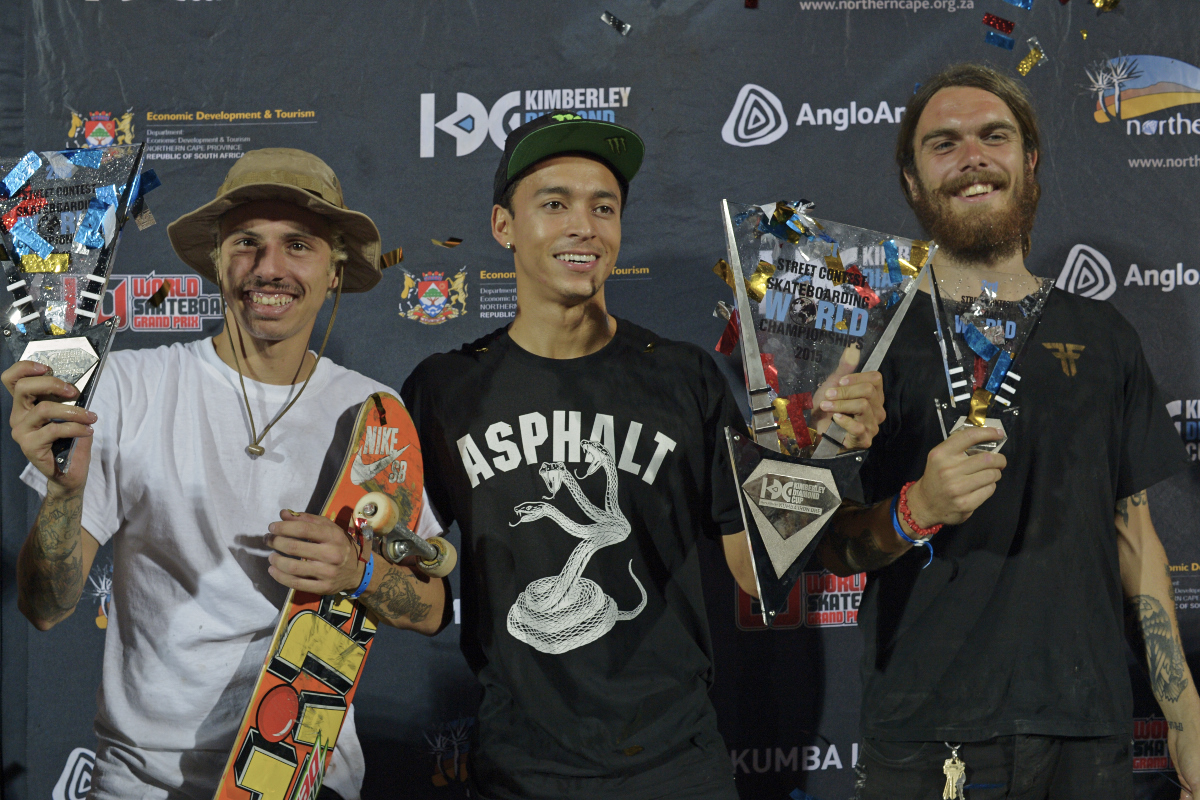
KDC 2015 Street World Championships - Podium trio: from left, Luan Oliveira, Brazil (2nd), Nyjah Huston, USA (1st) and JS LaPierre, Canada (3rd)

Skaters from more than 50 countries were represented in the 2015 Kimberley Diamond Cup skateboarding competition, which was held October 7–10 at the Kumba Skate Plaza. In the Street World Championships final, twelve finalists from eight countries competed for the world title and $100,000 top prize. Nyjah Huston of the U.S. was the third-place qualifier for the event and first-place winner in 2013. In the final, Huston edged out Luan Oliveira of Brazil to capture first prize. In the Vert World Championships, Jimmy Wilkins reclaimed the title he won in 2014 and the $35,000 first place prize.

2015 Events	Top Finishers
Skateboarding World Championship Finals	1. United States Nyjah Huston; 2. Brazil Luan Oliveira; 3. Canada JS Lapierre
Women's Street World Championships	1. United States Alexis Sablone; 2. United States Vanessa Torre; 3. Brazil Leticia Bufoni
Vert World Championships	1. United States Jimmy Wilkins; 2. United States Mitchie Brusco; 3. Canada Pierre Luc Gagnon
South African Street Finals	1. South Africa Brandon Valjalo; 2. South Africa Alan Marola; 3. South Africa Allan Adams
South African Vert Finals	1. South Africa Damian Bramley; 2. South Africa Graham Denoon; 3. South Africa Dallas Oberholzer
Top Grom South African Championships	1. South Africa Tyler Kammies; 2. South Africa Aya Gericke; 3. South Africa Jamie de Villiers
South African Women's Street Championships	1. South Africa Kelly Murray; 2. South Africa Boipelo Awuah; 3. South Africa Natalie Bramley
Rider Cup Team Championships	1. South Africa Team AKAM; 2. South Africa Traes 1 Cup; 3. South Africa Durban Dirtbags

=== 2014 Kimberley Diamond Cup ===
The 2014 Kimberley Diamond Cup was held from October 2–5 at the Kumba Skate Plaza. Skaters from 37 countries participated.

Kelvin Hoefler from Brazil placed first in the Street competition and took home first prize, which came with $100,000. Hoefler performed a switch-frontside blunt down the rail and 360 flip lipslide down the rail. Nyjah Huston, 2013 winner in the Street event, was the top qualifier but he was eliminated in the final rounds of the head-to-head Street competition.

In the Mini MegaBig Air World Championships, 14-year-old Alana Smith of the U.S. became the first female to successfully perform a backflip in competition.

Eight 4-man teams of skateboarders, including several teams from South Africa, competed in the Rider Cup Team Championships during Kimberley Diamond Cup. The South African team 4 Staxx took the Rider Cup Team Championship 2014 title.

2014 Events	Top Finishers
Skateboarding World Championship Finals	1. Brazil Kelvin Hoefler; 2. Australia Tommy Fynn; 3. United States Louie Lopez
Women's Street World Championships	1. United States Samarria Brevard; 2. United States Alexis Sablone; 3. Brazil Pamela Rosa
Vert World Championship	1. United States Jimmy Wilkins; 2. Brazil Sandro Dias; 3. United States Elliot Sloan
South African Vert Finals; Street Skateboarding Championships	1. South Africa Jacques Allison; 2. South Africa Werner du Plessis; 3. South Africa Graham Denoon
Big Air World Championships	1. United States Jono Schwan; 2. United States Elliot Sloan; 3. United States Clay Kreiner
South African Am Street & Youth Championships	1. South Africa Brandon Valjalo; 2. South Africa Alan Marola; 3. South Africa Stefan Jacobs
Rider Cup Team Championships	1. South Africa 4 Staxx; 2. South Africa Get It Get It!; 3. South Africa Clean Team

=== 2013 Kimberley Diamond Cup ===
The total prize purse at the 2013 Kimberley Diamond Cup was R5,000,000, approximately $500,000 in US dollars at the time, and was the largest single-event prize purse in skateboarding that year.

During the summer of 2013, professional skateboarders Ryan Decenzo and Adam Dyet joined the WSGP's Skateboarding for Hope tour in the Northern Cape province and participated in skateboarding clinics and demonstrations in Kathu, Kuruman, Postmasburg and Kimberley.

American professional street skateboarder Nyjah Huston won the Pro Street Contest at the Kimberley Diamond Cup, and $100,000 in prize money. Huston's highlights included a nollie heelflip backlip, switch frontside blunt, fakie five-o on high flat bar. Huston has been called "the best contest street skateboarder in the world" and is a 4-time X Games gold medalist. During practice, Huston was filmed performing a 270-degree "kickflip lipslide" on a rail, a difficult skateboarding trick that had never been on a full-sized handrail.

"Vert legend" Andy MacDonald won the Vert/BigAir Overall (combined results from 50% Vert and 50% Big Air competition scores). MacDonald holds the record for the most X Games medals in vert skateboarding and was crowned as skateboarding's World Champion nine times in the World Cup Skateboard Series.

2013 Events	Top Finishers
Skateboarding World Championship Finals	1. United States Nyjah Huston; 2. Brazil Felipe Gustavo; 3. United States Louie Lopez
Vert World Championship	1. United States Andy MacDonald; 2. Canada Pierre-Luc Gagnon; 3. United States Jono Schwan
South African Amateur; Street Skateboarding Championships	1. South Africa Braxton Haine; 2. South Africa Khule Ngubane; 3. South Africa Mitchell Rice
Girl's Street	1. South Africa Kelly Murray; 2. South Africa Melissa Williams; 3. South Africa Natalie Bramley
Vert/BigAir Overall – Combined results from 50% Vert and 50% Big Air scores	1. United States Andy MacDonald; 2. United States Jono Schwan; 3. Canada Pierre-Luc Gagnon
Big Air	1. United States Jono Schwan; 2. United States Andy MacDonald; 3. United States Jagger Eaton
Big Air Best Trick	1. United States Jagger Eaton; 2. United States Jono Schwan; 3. United States Andy MacDonald
