= The X-Life =

- Country of origin: United States
- No. of seasons: 1
- No. of episodes: 10

Production
- Executive producers: Ben Samek; Cris Abrego; Jeff Olde; Jill Holmes; Joe Simpson; Rabih Gholam; Sean Boyle
- Running time: 40 minutes
- Production companies: 51 Minds Entertainment; JT Entertainment

Original release
- Network: VH1
- Release: January 10 – February 28, 2011

The X-Life is an American reality television series on VH1. The series debuted on January 10, 2011.

== Premise ==
The series follows three extreme athletes and their wives as they navigate their lives with their famous careers.

== Cast ==
- Pierre Luc Gagnon (Vert Skater)
- Denise Russo
- Cory "Nasty" Nastazio (BMX Dirt Jumper)
- Nicole Panattoni
- Jeremy "Twitch" Stenburg (FMX)
- Susie Stenberg

== Episodes ==
No.	Title	Original release date
1	"She Knew What She Married"	January 10, 2011
2	"It's My World, You Just Live In It'"	January 17, 2011
3	"I Hope He Doesn't Punch Me In The Face"	January 17, 2011
4	"It's Not Gonna Break Us, Is It?"	January 24, 2011
5	"The Dishes and The Dogs"	January 31, 2011
6	"Third Time's A Charm"	February 7, 2011
7	"It'll Never Change"	February 14, 2011
8	"I'm Over It"	February 21, 2011
9	"Things Got a Little Out of Hand"	February 21, 2011
10	"A Nasty Jam"	February 28, 2011
