= Vicki Golden =

American motorcycle racer

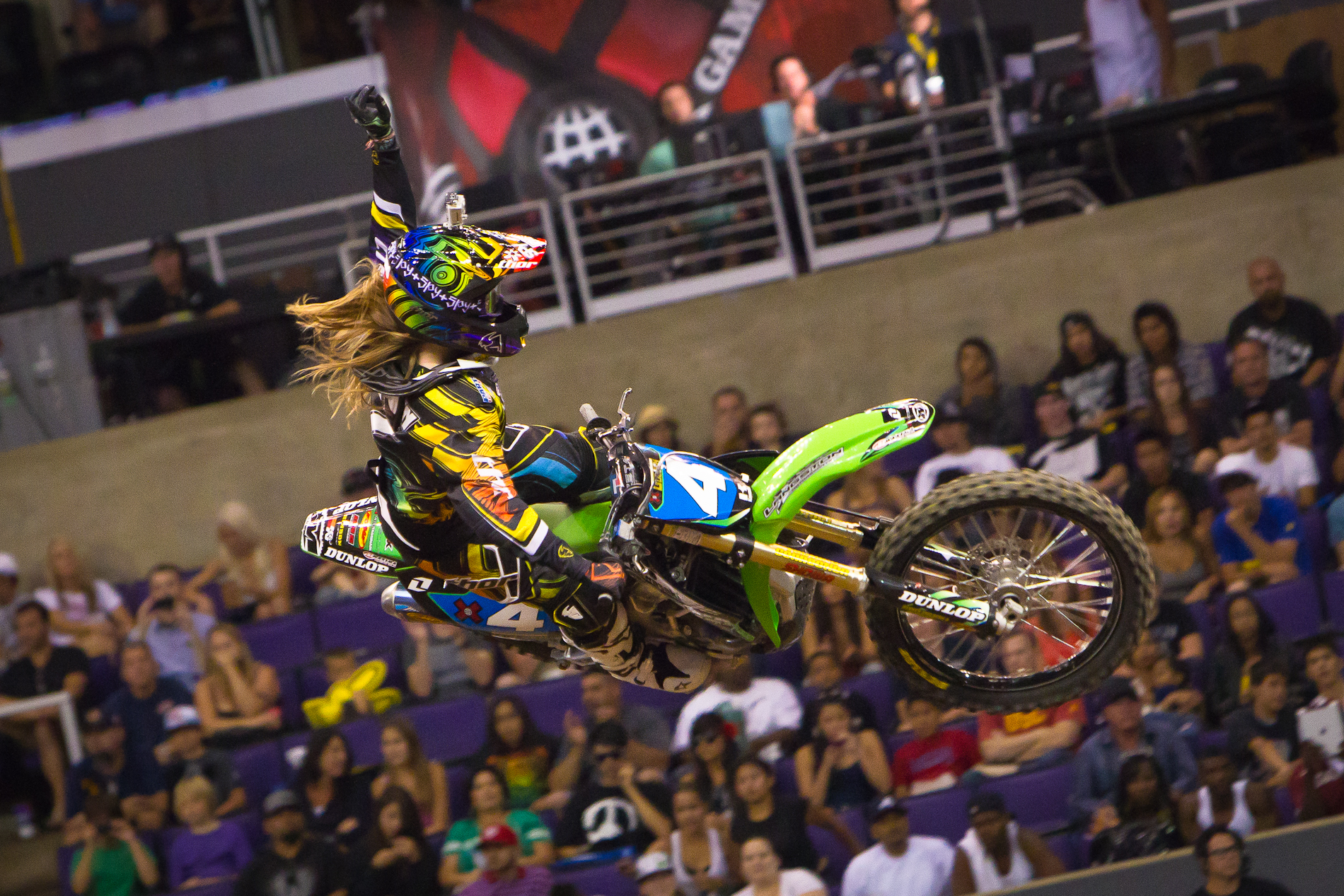
- Golden at the X Games XVII (2011)
- Nationality: (United States) American
- Born: July 28, 1992 (age 34) San Diego, California, U.S.

Motocross career
- Years active: 2000-active

Vicki Golden (born July 28, 1992 in San Diego, California) is an American professional Freestyle Motocross rider and the first female team member of Metal mulisha, Since beginning her career in 2000 Golden has won three consecutive gold medals in Women's Moto X Racing at the X Games. She is also the first woman to compete in a freestyle Moto X competition, earning the bronze medal in the best whip category. She currently rides a Suzuki 450/250 motocross bike.

== Early career ==
Golden began racing at the age of seven after seeing her brother and her father race. Golden had to race with boys, because there weren't enough girls to create a separate race class. Golden's career took off at age 12, after competing in the Loretta Lynn's Amateur Motocross National Championships in Tennessee where she won the Women's Amateur National Champion title. In the same year, she also earned her AMA/WMX Pro License.

== Career highlights ==
2008 - Loretta Lynn's AMA Women's Amateur Champion

2009 - TransWorld Motocross Magazine's Female Motocross Rookie of the Year

2011 - Won the gold medal in the Women's Moto X Racing in the Summer X Games

2011 - First Female to break top 10 in AMA Arena Cross Lites Main

2011 - First female to qualify for AMA Arena Cross Premier class night show

2012 - Won her second gold medal in the Women's Moto X Racing in the Summer X Games

2012 - Third consecutive gold medal in the Women's Moto X Racing in the Summer X Games won bronze for Moto X Best Whip

2014 - First woman to complete Ricky Carmichael's Road to Supercross

2014 - Nominated for an ESPY Award in 2014 for Best Female Action Sports Athlete

2015 - First woman in Monster Energy AMA Supercross, an FIM World Championship, to qualify for the “Fast 40″ – the riders that transition to the night program from time qualifying – which she did for the 2015 finale.
