= Leo Baker (skateboarder) =

American skateboarder (born 1991)

Personal information
- Born: November 24, 1991 (age 34) Covina, California, U.S.
- Height: 5 ft 3 in (1.60 m)
- Weight: 135 lb (61 kg)

Sport
- Country: United States
- Sport: Skateboarding
Medal record
Women's street skateboarding
Representing the United States
World Championships
Gold medal – first place	2016 Los Angeles	Street
Gold medal – first place	2017 Los Angeles	Street
Bronze medal – third place	2018 Rio de Janeiro	Street
Summer X Games
Gold medal – first place	2014 Austin	Street
Silver medal – second place	Norway 2018	Street
Silver medal – second place	2013 Los Angeles	Street
Silver medal – second place	2013 Foz do Iguaçu	Street
Bronze medal – third place	2006 Los Angeles	Street
Bronze medal – third place	2016 Austin	Street

Leo Baker (formerly Lacey Baker; born November 24, 1991) is a goofy-footed American professional skateboarder from Covina, California, now based in New York City. Baker is transgender and non-binary, and uses he/him and they/them pronouns.

== Early life ==
Baker was born in Covina, California to Donna Baker and guitarist Marshall Rohner. He spent a year of his early childhood in foster care, and became interested in skateboarding after seeing his foster brothers skating in their backyard. Baker got his first skateboard shortly after this, aged two. Baker lists his proudest moment as the first time he landed a kickflip.

== Career ==
Aged eleven, Baker picked up his first sponsorship—from Utility Board Shop in La Verne—off the back of a video part filmed over two days by a skateboard instructor who recognised his talent. In following years, Baker gained further sponsorships, and found success at contests around the world.

Aged around 19, however, he quit his board sponsor, Element, while Billabong, another long-time sponsor, cut its skate team. With the industry contracting due to the 2008 financial crisis, and facing pressure from sponsors regarding gender expression, Baker sensed that his career in skateboarding might be limited going forward and pursued a degree in graphic design.

While working a design job after graduating college, Baker filmed and released his first full part, entitled "Bombshell", through Thrasher Magazine in 2013. He also continued to compete, winning three medals at X Games events in 2013 and 2014. Yet Baker still struggled to find sponsors, and so decided to join his friend Lisa Whitaker's new company Meow Skateboards, intended to fill "a void in the industry" for a skateboard brand run by women with an all-female team.

In 2017, Baker was the only skateboarder to be nominated for an ESPY Award in the "Best Female Action Sports Athlete" category.

In 2020, Baker, Cher Strauberry, and Stephen Ostrowski founded Glue Skateboards. As of 2022, Baker is sponsored by Nike SB, Glue Skateboards, Spitfire Wheels, Independent Trucks, Bronson Speed Co., Mob Grip, and Pawnshop Skate Co.

== Other ventures ==
Prior to turning pro and moving to New York, Baker worked as a graphic designer in Los Angeles, an environment they found unfulfilling; however, Baker continues to pursue creative projects, including a collaboration with fellow NYC skateboarder Brian Anderson resulting in the release of Cave Homo ("Human Beware" in Latin, a pun on Cave emptor, or "Buyer beware") Volume II in which they were featured (Volume I featured Anderson), a limited-run zine whose inverse side features original works by queer artists, and a portion of whose proceeds goes to support The Trevor Project. In June 2021, Baker's memoir Skate for Your Life was published by Penguin Workshop for the "Pocket Change Collective" series. The book shares about their journey of authenticity and challenges in the skateboarding industry.

== Media appearances ==
Baker appears in the 2020 video game Tony Hawk's Pro Skater 1 + 2, a remake of the first two Tony Hawk's Pro Skater video games, making him the first non-binary and transgender professional skateboarder in the series.

In 2022, Baker starred in the Netflix biographical documentary film titled Stay on Board: The Leo Baker Story, directed by Nicola Marsh and Giovanni Reda. This documentary details his life and experience as a transgender man. It focuses on his struggles as a trans man in the professional skating industry, as well as how these experiences have influenced his day-to-day life.

== Competition history ==
=== 2019 ===
- World Skate OI STU, Open Qualifiers, in Rio De Janeiro, Brazil: 20th place (street)
- USA Skateboarding National Championships, Finals: 4th place (street)
- Street League World Championships, Quarter Finals, in São Paulo, Brazil: 32nd place
- X Games, in Minneapolis, Minnesota: 9th place (street)
- World Skate Street League Pro Tour, Semi-Finals in Los Angeles, California: 22nd place (street)
- Dew Tour, Finals, in Long Beach, California: 8th place (street)
- Street League World Skate, Semi-Final, in London, England: 10th place (street)
- Street League World Championships, Finals, in Rio De Janeiro, Brazil: 3rd place (street)

=== 2018 ===
- X Games, in Minneapolis, Minnesota: 8th place (street)
- Street League Pro Open, Finals, in London, England: 2nd place
- X Games, in Oslo, Norway: 2nd place (street)
- Skate Like a Girl Wheels of Fortune, Pro Final, in Seattle, Washington: 5th place

=== 2017 ===
- Street League Super Crown, in Los Angeles, California: 1st place
- Wheels of Fortune, Advanced, in Seattle, Washington: 11th place

=== 2016 ===
- Exposure Pro Street, in Encinitas, California: 5th place
- Street League Super Crown, in Los Angeles, California: 1st place
- X Games, in Austin, Texas: 3rd place (street)
- X Games, in Oslo, Norway: 2nd place (street)

=== 2015 ===
- Exposure Pro Street, in Encinitas, California: 3rd place
- Kimberley Diamond Cup World Championships, in Kimberley, South Africa: 5th place (street)
- Street League, Finals, in Chicago, Illinois: 4th place
- X Games, in Austin, Texas: 5th place (street)

=== 2014 ===
- X Games, in Austin, Texas: 1st place (street)

=== 2013 ===
- X Games, in Los Angeles, California: 2nd place (street)
- X Games, in Foz do Iguaçu, Brazil: 2nd place (street)

=== 2010 ===
- Mystic Skate Cup, in Prague, Czech Republic: 1st place (street)

=== 2008 ===
- Maloof Money Cup, in Orange County, California: 1st place (street)

=== 2007 ===
- X Games XIII, in Los Angeles, California: 4th place (street)
- Mystic Skate Cup, in Prague, Czech Republic: 3rd place (street)
- Rockstar Masa Pro, in Fayetteville, North Carolina: 2nd place (street)

=== 2006 ===
- X Games XII, in Los Angeles, California: 3rd place (street)
- Goofy vs. Regular, in Lake Forest, California: 3rd place (street)
- West 49 Canadian Open, in Toronto, Ontario: 1st place (street)
- Slam City Jam, in Calgary, Alberta: 1st place (street)
