= X Games XVII =

Sporting event

X Games Los Angeles 2011
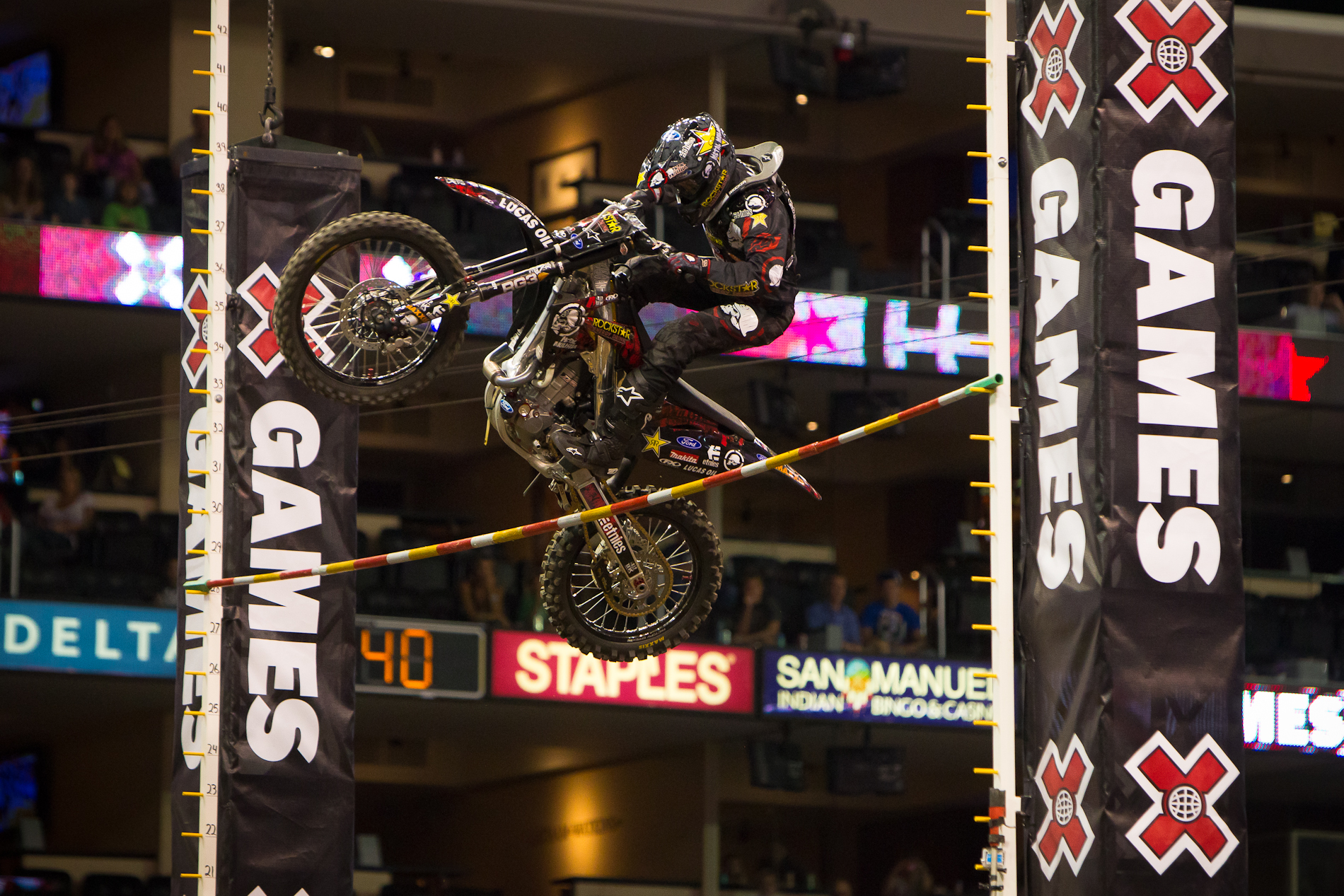
- Venue: Staples Center; L.A. Live; Nokia Theatre
- Location: Los Angeles, California
- Date: July 28-31

X Games XVII was an action sporting event which took place from July 28 – 31, 2011 in Los Angeles, California. Venues for the event include the Staples Center, Nokia Theatre, and other areas of L.A. Live. The games featured the sports of motocross, skateboarding, BMX, and rallying. X Games 17 was also the first ever X Games to feature Enduro X, which replaced Super X.

== Results ==
=== Moto X ===
Event	Gold		Silver		Bronze	
Men's Moto X Enduro	Taddy Blazusiak (POL)		Mike Brown (USA)		Justin Soule (USA)	
Women's Moto X Enduro	Maria Forsberg (USA)		Tarah Gieger (PUR)		Kacy Martinez (USA)	
Women's Moto X Racing	Vicki Golden (USA)		Tarah Gieger (PUR)		Livia Lancelot (FRA)	
Moto X Freestyle	Nate Adams (USA)	91	Adam Jones (USA)	86	Dany Torres (ESP)	83
Moto X Step Up	Matt Buyten (USA)	37' 0"	Ronnie Renner (USA)	35' 6"	Myles Richmond (USA); Brian Deegan (USA)	35' 6"
Moto X Best Whip*	Jeremy Stenberg (USA)	27%	Todd Potter (USA)	24%	Jarryd McNeil (AUS)	22%
Moto X Best Trick	Jackson Strong (AUS)	95.66	Cam Sinclair (AUS)	94.66	Josh Sheehan (AUS)	93.33
Moto X Speed & Style	Nate Adams (USA)		Mike Mason (USA)		Ronnie Faisst (USA)	

* Competition decided by fan text message voting.

=== Skateboarding ===
Event	Gold		Silver		Bronze	
Skateboard Big Air	Bob Burnquist (BRA)	92.66	Adam Taylor (USA)	89.66	Edgard Pereira (BRA)	87.00
Skateboard Freestyle Vert	Shaun White (USA)	93.00	Pierre-Luc Gagnon (CAN)	91.66	Bucky Lasek (USA)	87.66
Skateboard Street	Nyjah Huston (USA)	91.66	Luan Oliveira (BRA)	91.00	Ryan Sheckler (USA)	89.00
Women's Skateboard Street	Marisa Dal Santo (USA)	88.00	Alexis Sablone (USA)	84.33	Leticia Bufoni (BRA)	78.00
Skateboard Park	Raven Tershy (USA)	82	Pedro Barros (BRA)	81	Ben Hatchell (USA)	75
Hometown Heroes Amateur Skateboard Street	Julian Christianson (USA)	88.33	Brendon Villanueva (USA)	86.66	Dan Coe (USA)	80.00
Skateboard Game of SK8	Ryan Decenzo (CAN)					

=== BMX ===
Event	Gold		Silver		Bronze	
BMX Freestyle Vert	Jamie Bestwick (GBR)	92	Steve McCann (AUS)	90	Vince Byron (AUS)	79
BMX Freestyle Park	Daniel Dhers (VEN)	81 (35)	Dennis Enarson (USA)	81 (31)	Scotty Cranmer (USA)	72
BMX Freestyle Big Air	Steve McCann (AUS)	91.66	Vince Byron (AUS)	90.66	Chad Kagy (USA)	89.33
BMX Freestyle Street	Garrett Reynolds (USA)	92	Dennis Enarson (USA)	85	Dakota Roche (USA)	84

=== Rallying ===
Event	Gold	Silver	Bronze
Rally Car Racing	Liam Doran (GBR)	Marcus Grönholm (FIN)	David Higgins (GBR)
RallyCross	Brian Deegan (USA)	Tanner Foust (USA)	Marcus Grönholm (FIN)

== Medal table ==
Rank	Nation	Gold	Silver	Bronze	Total
1	United States (USA)	13	11	12	36
2	Australia (AUS)	2	3	3	8
3	Great Britain (GBR)	2	0	1	3
4	Brazil (BRA)	1	2	2	5
5	Canada (CAN)	1	1	0	2
6	Poland (POL)	1	0	0	1
6	Venezuela (VEN)	1	0	0	1
8	Puerto Rico (PUR)	0	2	0	2
9	Finland (FIN)	0	1	1	2
10	France (FRA)	0	0	1	1
10	Spain (ESP)	0	0	1	1
Totals (11 entries)		21	20	21	62

== Highlights ==
- Travis Pastrana breaks bones in his foot and ankle in a crash suffered in Moto X Best Trick. Despite the injury, Pastrana competes in RallyCross three days later using hand controls mounted to the steering wheel. Pastrana was also scheduled to compete in the IZOD IndyCar Series' World Championship later on in the year but due to the injury, he had withdrawn from the race.
- Jackson Strong successfully lands the first front-flip in competition history in Moto X Best Trick, winning the gold.
- Steve McCann lands the second no-handed-900 in competition history, but Jamie Bestwick defeats him to win his 5th consecutive gold medal in BMX Freestyle Vert.
- 14-year-old Mitchie Brusco successfully lands a 900 while practicing for the Skateboard Big Air finals, but he fails to pull off the feat in competition.
- 16-year-old Nyjah Huston wins gold in Skateboard Street.
- Shaun White comes from behind to defeat three time defending champion Pierre-Luc Gagnon in the final round of Skateboard Vert.
