= EA Black Box =

Canadian video game developing company

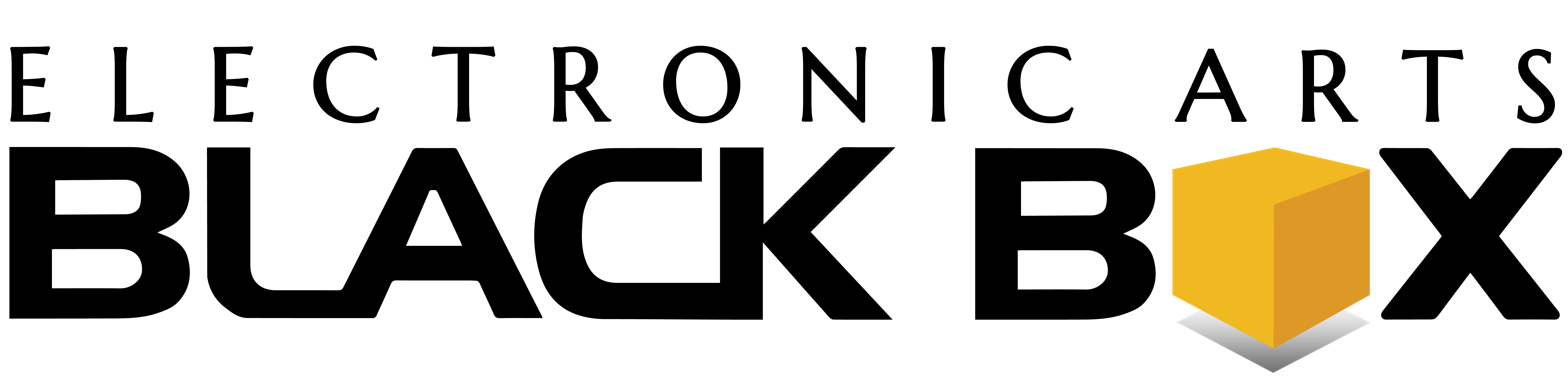
- Formerly: Black Box Games (1998–2012); Quicklime Games (2012–2013)
- Type: Subsidiary
- Industry: Video games
- Founded: 1998; 28 years ago
- Defunct: April 2013; 13 years ago
- Fate: Merged and folded into EA Canada in 2009, Dissolved in 2013
- Successor: Full Circle; Ghost Games; SkyBox Labs
- Headquarters: Burnaby, British Columbia, Canada
- Products: Need for Speed series; Skate series
- Parent: Electronic Arts (2002–2013)
- Website: www.eablackbox.com

EA Black Box (formerly Black Box Games) was a video game developer based in Burnaby, British Columbia, Canada, founded in 1998 by former employees of Radical Entertainment and later acquired by Electronic Arts (EA). The developers are primarily known for the Need for Speed and Skate series. It was renamed Quicklime Games during the development of Need for Speed: World, but after a series of restructures it was shut down in April 2013.

== History ==
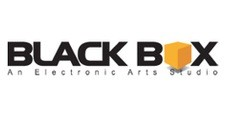
Old Logo

Black Box Games had previously developed for game publishers such as Sega, Midway Games, and EA. In June 2002, during the development of Need for Speed: Hot Pursuit 2, the firm was acquired by EA and became an entirely owned subsidiary of EA Canada. As a result of the acquisition the studio's name was changed to EA Black Box. In March 2003, the firm lacked space for their current projects and as a solution the top four floors of an office tower in downtown Vancouver were used for expansion. In March 2005, EA Black Box became an independent studio from EA Canada, but still owned by EA.

On December 19, 2008, EA announced that it would be shutting down EA Black Box's Vancouver studio location and relocating operations to EA Canada's Burnaby facilities, as part of EA's worldwide consolidation plans. Officials stressed that EA Black Box would remain open, and said they expected the move to be completed by June 2009. The studio remained a part of the EA Games label, and was independent of the EA Sports studio also located within the Burnaby facility.

In February 2012, EA confirmed a number of lay-offs at EA Canada and EA Black Box, and that they were transforming the studios towards "high-growth digital formats, including online, social gaming and free-to-play". EA declined to comment on whether EA Black Box's brand would remain.

In July 2012, EA Black Box was renamed Quicklime Games during the development of PC game Need for Speed: World, under which name it operated until its closure in April 2013.

Responsibility for the Need for Speed franchise was taken over by Ghost Games in late 2013.

== Games developed ==
Year	Title	Platform(s)	Notes
As Black Box Games
2000	NASCAR 2001	PlayStation	
2000	NASCAR 2001	PlayStation 2	
2000	NHL 2K	Dreamcast	
2001	NHL Hitz 2002	GameCube	
2001	NHL Hitz 2002	PlayStation 2	
2001	NHL Hitz 2002	Xbox	
2002	Need for Speed: Hot Pursuit 2	PlayStation 2	
2002	NHL Hitz 2003	GameCube	
2002	NHL Hitz 2003	PlayStation 2	
2002	NHL Hitz 2003	Xbox	
2002	Sega Soccer Slam	GameCube	
2002	Sega Soccer Slam	PlayStation 2	
2002	Sega Soccer Slam	Xbox	
As EA Black Box
2003	Need for Speed: Underground	GameCube	
2003	Need for Speed: Underground	Microsoft Windows	
2003	Need for Speed: Underground	PlayStation 2	
2003	Need for Speed: Underground	Xbox	
2003	NHL 2004	GameCube	
2003	NHL 2004	Microsoft Windows	
2003	NHL 2004	PlayStation 2	
2003	NHL 2004	Xbox	
2004	Need for Speed: Underground 2	GameCube	
2004	Need for Speed: Underground 2	Microsoft Windows	
2004	Need for Speed: Underground 2	PlayStation 2	
2004	Need for Speed: Underground 2	Xbox	
2004	NHL 2005	GameCube	
2004	NHL 2005	Microsoft Windows	
2004	NHL 2005	PlayStation 2	
2004	NHL 2005	Xbox	
2005	Need for Speed: Most Wanted	GameCube	
2005	Need for Speed: Most Wanted	Microsoft Windows	
2005	Need for Speed: Most Wanted	PlayStation 2	
2005	Need for Speed: Most Wanted	Xbox	
2005	Need for Speed: Most Wanted	Xbox 360	
2006	Need for Speed: Carbon	GameCube	
2006	Need for Speed: Carbon	Microsoft Windows	
2006	Need for Speed: Carbon	PlayStation 2	
2006	Need for Speed: Carbon	PlayStation 3	
2006	Need for Speed: Carbon	Wii	
2006	Need for Speed: Carbon	Xbox	
2006	Need for Speed: Carbon	Xbox 360	
2006	Need for Speed: Carbon - Own the City	PlayStation Portable	Assisted Team Fusion
2007	NBA Street Homecourt	PlayStation 3	
2007	NBA Street Homecourt	Xbox 360	
2007	Need for Speed: ProStreet	Microsoft Windows	
2007	Need for Speed: ProStreet	PlayStation 2	
2007	Need for Speed: ProStreet	PlayStation 3	
2007	Need for Speed: ProStreet	Wii	
2007	Need for Speed: ProStreet	Xbox 360	
2007	Skate	PlayStation 3	
2007	Skate	Xbox 360	
2008	Need for Speed: Undercover	Microsoft Windows	
2008	Need for Speed: Undercover	PlayStation 3	
2008	Need for Speed: Undercover	Xbox 360	
2008	Skate It	Nintendo DS	Assisted Exient Entertainment
2008	Skate It	Wii	
2009	Need for Speed: Shift	Microsoft Windows	Assisted Slightly Mad Studios
2009	Need for Speed: Shift	PlayStation 3	Assisted Slightly Mad Studios
2009	Need for Speed: Shift	Xbox 360	Assisted Slightly Mad Studios
2009	Skate 2	PlayStation 3	
2009	Skate 2	Xbox 360	
2010	Need for Speed: World	Microsoft Windows	
2010	Skate 3	PlayStation 3	
2010	Skate 3	Xbox 360	
2011	Battlefield 3	Microsoft Windows	Assisted DICE
2011	Battlefield 3	PlayStation 3	Assisted DICE
2011	Battlefield 3	Xbox 360	Assisted DICE
2011	Need for Speed: The Run	Microsoft Windows	
2011	Need for Speed: The Run	PlayStation 3	
2011	Need for Speed: The Run	Xbox 360	
As EA Jawbreaker
2015	Battlefield Hardline	Microsoft Windows	Assisted Visceral Games
2015	Battlefield Hardline	PlayStation 3	Assisted Visceral Games
2015	Battlefield Hardline	PlayStation 4	Assisted Visceral Games
2015	Battlefield Hardline	Xbox 360	Assisted Visceral Games
2015	Battlefield Hardline	Xbox One	Assisted Visceral Games
