= Alex Perelson =

American skateboarder (born 1990)

- Born: December 5, 1990 (age 34); San Diego, California, U.S.
- Occupation: Professional skateboarder
- Known for: Vert skateboarding
- Height: 5 ft 6 in (168 cm)
- Parent(s): Glenn Perelson (father), Sofia Perelson (mother)
- Relatives: Brandon Perelson (brother), Adriana Perelson (sister)

Alex Perelson (born December 5, 1990, San Diego, California) is a professional skateboarder living in San Diego. Perelson began vert skateboarding in 1999 and turned professional in 2005.

== Career ==
Perelson has been referred to as "San Diego's Favored Son" and according to one appraisal:

Not since the coming of fellow skateboarders Shaun White and Ryan Sheckler has there been a young skater who poses such dominant talent in his age group...the consensus is unanimous; Alex Perelson is the future of vert skateboarding.

According to an article about him in the North County Times, Perelson wanted to become a professional skateboarder from the time he started skating at age nine.

"It looked like fun," Perelson said, "so I got one (skateboard) of my own and started doing it more and more, and pretty soon I was at the skatepark six hours a day."

At thirteen years old, he won first place at the Dam Am Vert competition in Costa Mesa, California and did a 540 in his final run. His professional career began in 2005 when, at age sixteen, he took second place at the LG Action Sports World Championship in Manchester, England and received a $20,000 prize. He has since appeared at events in Copenhagen, Mexico City, Dubai, and various locations within the United States.

In order to better pursue his career, Perelson withdrew from Grossmont High School in 10th grade in order to attend San Diego Charter School and to be allowed more flexibility in his schedule. His choice has meant missing high school football games and proms but he remarked "I wouldn't go to those anyways".

He is the youngest skater in the vert field and is also the only rookie. He competed in the AST Dew Tour 2007 and finished sixth out of the ten riders, telling The Washington Post in an interview, "Those are probably the best runs I've ever done in my life." He won an $8000 prize for fourth place at the X Games in Los Angeles "with back-to-back 540s and 720s in his run."

He then qualified for the AST Dew Tour on his first attempt at the Panasonic Open, and secured a nomination for the "PlayStation Trick of the Week" at the Right Guard Open that same season which was, according to an article in The San Diego Union-Tribune, a "breakout summer" for the young athlete.

Regarding his long range career goals, the young athlete has said:

Tony Hawk is (39) and is able to do a lot of stuff...I don' t know what it takes to skate when you are that old, but hopefully I can do it. I want to keep skating for as long as I can.

In July 2009, at the Maloof Money Cup presented by Monster Energy Drink in Costa Mesa, California, he became the 4th person ever to pull the 900. He won $75,000 and did the 900 to secure his number one spot in the vert competition.

== Sponsorship ==
Perelson's skateboarding sponsorship now includes Vans, Rockstar Energy Drink, Protec, Bronson Speed Co., Thunder Trucks, Spitfire Wheels, Skeleton Key MFG, Randoms Hardware, Stratosphere Skate Shop, Paradox Griptape, and 187 Killer Pads.

== Personal life ==
Perelson formerly lived in Bonita, California. He has an older sister and a younger brother named Brandon, who is also a skater; his father, Glenn, is a cardiologist.
