= Skate It =

2008 video game

- Developers: EA Black Box; EA Montreal (Wii); Exient Entertainment (DS)
- Publisher: Electronic Arts
- Director: Gaivan Chang
- Producers: Alex Hyder; Mike McCartney
- Designers: Éric Chartrand; Thomas Hill (DS)
- Programmer: Frédéric O'Reilley
- Artists: Pierre-Sébastien; Randy Humphries
- Series: Skate
- Platforms: Nintendo DS, Wii, iOS
- Release: NA: November 19, 2008; AU: November 20, 2008; EU: November 21, 2008; JP: February 12, 2009 (Wii only); iOS: WW: May 10, 2010
- Genre: Extreme sports
- Modes: Single-player, multiplayer

Skate It is a skateboarding video game developed by EA Black Box, EA Montreal, and Exient Entertainment for the Nintendo DS, Wii, and iOS. The game is a spin-off of 2007's Skate and was released in 2008.

== Overview ==
Skate It is set between the events of Skate and Skate 2 in San Vanelona, the same fictional city as the original game, although several earthquakes have caused widespread damage and a mass evacuation of the city, leaving the player free to skate alone and undisturbed. They will, however, be able to travel to other cities in the world later in the game, which are unaffected by the disaster (London, Barcelona, Paris, Shanghai, San Francisco and Rio de Janeiro). Skate It is the only game in the series to not feature the main protagonist of the series, as this is set during the protagonist's incarceration explained in Skate 2.

Because the Nintendo DS and Wii (Note: Unless using the GameCube Controller or Classic Controller, neither which are supported by Skate It) lack the dual analog sticks that were used for control in the original game, the controls for Skate It were redesigned to take advantage of each platform's unique hardware. For example, the Wii version utilizes the motion sensing of the Wii Remote to control the player's skateboard, with gestures used to perform tricks, while the Nintendo DS version features stylus and touchscreen control. The Wii version also features support for the Wii Balance Board and also allows players to connect a Nunchuk and use its analog stick for more precise steering and spinning in the air.

The Wii version uses a modified version of the original's game engine, supports 480p and widescreen display options, and contains the instant Replay feature from the original game. The Wii version also offers a deep and unique career mode that allows the player to earn sponsors, unlock gear, and travel to the abovementioned several cities outside of San Vanelona, a first for the series. In addition, a number of offline and online multiplayer modes are available. The player can also customize their skater's gender and appearance, allowing them to play as a female skater, which was not possible in the original Skate.

The iOS version is a direct port of the Nintendo DS version, and was released around the same time as Skate 3. The Wii version's soundtrack is a subset of Skate 2's soundtrack, with only four of these songs available on the DS and iOS versions due to technical limitations.

== Reception ==
Reception

Aggregate score
Aggregator	Score		
Aggregator	DS	iOS	Wii
Metacritic	72/100	67/100	70/100

Review scores
Publication	Score		
Publication	DS	iOS	Wii
Edge	N/A	N/A	4/10
Eurogamer	N/A	N/A	5/10
Famitsu	N/A	N/A	24/40
Game Informer	N/A	N/A	7.75/10
GamePro	N/A	N/A	4/5
GameSpot	7.5/10	N/A	7/10
GameSpy	4/5	N/A	4/5
GameZone	N/A	N/A	8.6/10
Giant Bomb	N/A	N/A	2/5
IGN	7.9/10	6/10	8.5/10
Nintendo Power	5.5/10	N/A	6/10
411Mania	N/A	N/A	8/10

The game received "average" reviews on all platforms according to the review aggregation website Metacritic. In Japan, Famitsu gave the localized Wii version a score of all four sixes for a total of 24 out of 40.

IGN cited some issues with the Wii version's motion-based control scheme though they claim that for those willing to master it, the scheme reveals a great depth and a more nuanced trick system. They also praised the overall gameplay, the long and extensive single player mode, the soundtrack and presentation, but felt the in game graphics were "bland" and at times "nasty". IGN also called the DS version's gameplay challenging and satisfying due to its complexity, but were slightly disappointed by occasional bugs and glitches and an overall lack of polish compared to the Wii version. The Nintendo DS version was a nominee for several DS-specific awards by IGN in their 2008 video game awards, including Best Sports Game, Best Online Multiplayer Game, and Most Innovative Design.
