= Skate (2007 video game) =

- Developer: EA Black Box
- Publishers: Electronic Arts; EA Mobile (Mobile)
- Programmer: Mike Rayner
- Artist: Chris Sjoholm
- Composers: Z-Trip; Tommy Guerrero; XXXChange
- Series: Skate
- Platforms: Xbox 360; PlayStation 3 Mobile phone
- Release: Mobile: WW: September 13, 2007; Xbox 360: NA: September 14, 2007; PAL: September 28, 2007; PlayStation 3: NA: September 24, 2007; EU: October 5, 2007; AU: October 11, 2007
- Genre: Sports
- Modes: Single-player, multiplayer

Skate (stylized as skate.) is a 2007 skateboarding video game developed by EA Black Box and published by Electronic Arts for Xbox 360, PlayStation 3 and mobile phones. Two sequels, Skate 2 and Skate 3, were released for PlayStation 3 and Xbox 360, with a reboot, Skate (2025) releasing on Windows, PlayStation 4, PlayStation 5, Xbox One, and Xbox Series X/S, as well as Skate It, a spin-off for Wii, Nintendo DS and iOS platforms. It received positive reviews from critics.

== Development ==
The game's "flick it" control system began development long before any graphics had been implemented: the initial prototype simply read unique analog stick motions and displayed a basic text message saying what trick had been performed, along with speed and accuracy ratings. The developers found that in order to receive accurate information from the very fast analog stick motions used when playing the game, input data from each control pad had to be read at a rate of 120 Hz.

The game relies extensively on physics to model the skateboarders' movement. Havok, Endorphin and others were considered, but ultimately a RenderWare package called "Drives" was used to model the joints of the human body. Technical limitations and animation issues at the time resulted in certain planned features being cut and postponed to later installments, such as the ability to play as a female skater (which debuted in Skate It) or dismount and walk around (which was not possible until Skate 2).

Evidence from different versions of EA's official website for Skate show that the game has been through some major changes in development. For example, one screenshot, dated "04/06/2007", shows that San Vanelona was originally planned to be a coastal city, featuring a football stadium, harbor and cruise liner.

Major changes were also made to the soundtrack. Originally planned to feature "Roadhouse Blues" by The Doors, the soundtrack now focuses more heavily on hip-hop. Some songs appear in both studio and remixed form.

The demo was scheduled for release on Xbox Live for August 15, 2007 but was delayed (as stated by Scott Blackwood on the Skate forum) due to a sudden problem with the demo's Skate Reel (video editing) feature, releasing on August 21. It was released on PlayStation Network in September. The demo allowed players to skate around the San Vanelona Community Center for thirty minutes and learn how to do various tricks as well as to create and edit videos.

The multiplayer of the game was shut down in July 2011. Skate was added to Microsoft's backwards compatibility program in June 2019.

=== Mobile version ===
The mobile version of Skate features two game modes: Thrasher Mode (the main game mode, in which the player completes goals to make the cover of skateboarding magazine Thrasher) and Free Skate (where the player can play on levels previously unlocked in Thrasher Mode). The player plays as a customized skater, who receives tips from pro skaters Chris Cole and Rob Dyrdek, among others, through twelve missions divided in four goals each. Though the game is still set in San Vanelona, there are only three explorable areas: Plaza, Halfpipe and Downtown, aside from linear levels only playable in Thrasher Mode. The mobile version of Skate later won the "Cellular Game of the Year" award during the AIAS' 11th Annual Interactive Achievement Awards.

== Reception ==
Reception

Aggregate score
Aggregator	Score		
Aggregator	mobile	PS3	Xbox 360
Metacritic	N/A	85/100	86/100

Review scores
Publication	Score		
Publication	mobile	PS3	Xbox 360
Edge	N/A	8/10	N/A
Electronic Gaming Monthly	N/A	7.83/10	7.83/10
Eurogamer	N/A	N/A	9/10
Famitsu	N/A	31/40	31/40
Game Informer	N/A	8.75/10	8.75/10
GamePro	N/A	4/5	3.75/5
GameRevolution	N/A	N/A	B+
GameSpot	N/A	7/10	7.5/10
GameSpy	N/A	5/5	5/5
GameTrailers	N/A	8.1/10	8.1/10
GameZone	N/A	N/A	8.5/10
IGN	8/10	8.8/10	9/10
Official Xbox Magazine (US)	N/A	N/A	9/10
PlayStation: The Official Magazine	N/A	9/10	N/A
The A.V. Club	N/A	C+	C+
Digital Spy	N/A	N/A	4/5

Skate received "generally favorable" reviews from critics on both platforms according to review aggregator website Metacritic. Praise was given to the environments, control scheme, and soundtrack. Criticisms included latency issues with the online multiplayer, odd physics glitches, and the lack of freestyle tricks in both the PS3 and Xbox 360 versions of the game (although it is possible to do lip tricks because of the unique grind engine built into the game). The reviews praised the game for a good start and innovation, but the game was criticized for the in-game advertising and product placement. GameSpy praised the Xbox 360 version for the control scheme, presentation, expansive environments, audio, and amount of content. It was criticized for the learning curve, frustrating camera, and the slowdown in online game modes. In Japan, where the PS3 and Xbox 360 versions were ported for release on March 19, 2008, Famitsu gave both console versions each a score of two eights, one seven, and one eight for a total of 31 out of 40.

The New York Times gave the game universal acclaim. Digital Spy gave the Xbox 360 version four stars out of five and called it a superb example of how an extreme sports game should be done. In contrast, The A.V. Club gave the game a C+ because of its difficult learning curve and the game made more for hardcore gamers rather than casual ones.

During the 11th Annual Interactive Achievement Awards, the Academy of Interactive Arts & Sciences awarded the console version of Skate with "Sports Game of the Year", along with receiving nominations for "Outstanding Achievement in Sound Design" and "Outstanding Achievement in Soundtrack".

== Sequels ==
A spin-off game, titled Skate It, was released on the Nintendo DS, Wii and iOS in November 2008.

Achieving the commercial success, EA decided to work on a sequel to Skate. Skate 2 was released at the end of January 2009.

The third installment in the Skate franchise, Skate 3, was released on the PlayStation 3 and Xbox 360 in May 2010. The game is set in a new fictional city called Port Carverton. New gameplay features include the ability to perform dark slides and underflips. Skate 3 has a stronger emphasis on content creation and online team play than the previous games.

At the June 2020 EA Play event, a new Skate title was confirmed to be in development. EA established Full Circle, a new studio in Vancouver, British Columbia, to lead its development. The studio is led by Daniel McCulloch, and includes Deran Chung and Cuz Parry, who had created the original Skate games. The game will be called skate., and it will be offered as a free to play title when it launches.
