= Skate 2 =

2009 video game

- Developer: EA Black Box
- Publisher: Electronic Arts
- Director: Gaivan Chung
- Programmer: Eric Turmel
- Artists: Caroline Ancessi; Chris Sjoholm
- Series: Skate
- Platforms: PlayStation 3, Xbox 360
- Release: NA: January 21, 2009; AU: January 22, 2009; EU: January 23, 2009
- Genre: Sports
- Modes: Single-player, multiplayer

Skate 2 is a 2009 skateboarding video game developed by EA Black Box and published by Electronic Arts. The game was released worldwide in January 2009 for PlayStation 3 and Xbox 360 after the spin-off title Skate It. It is the sequel to 2007's Skate and the third installment in the Skate series overall. A sequel, Skate 3, was released in May 2010.

Set in the fictional city of New San Vanelona, the single-player career mode follows a skateboarder released from jail five years after being arrested in the first game, Skate, who is tasked with popularising skateboarding in the city again after devastating earthquakes, avoiding security guards hired by the company "Mongocorp" who have bought most of the city's property. Players create their own character and perform tricks such as ollies and grabs to earn points. Tricks can be used to complete challenges, such as racing and trick contests, which earn the player money that can be used to buy clothes and property or bet on events. Up to four players can play against each other in the local multiplayer "party play" mode, and an online multiplayer mode allows players to connect to games over the internet and take part in various competitive or cooperative activities.

Skate 2 is playable on Xbox One and Xbox Series X/S consoles through backwards compatibility.

== Premise ==
Skate 2 is set in the fictional city of New San Vanelona, where the player controls a skateboarder who has just been released from prison after being arrested 5 years ago in the first title in the series, Skate. Since spending time in jail, San Vanelona has been hit with an earthquake that occurred in the spin-off title Skate It, leaving the city in ruins. Eventually, the city was rebuilt and renamed to New San Vanelona. The City Council and Chamber of Commerce have deemed skateboarding a crime and a corporation called "Mongocorp" have bought and rebuilt most of the city's property, skate-proofed everything and installed a private security force to prevent people from skating. Upon exiting prison, the player meets Giovanni Reda, a cameraman who films the player's character throughout the game and provides commentary. The player is tasked with rebuilding their skater's career and popularising skateboarding in New San Vanelona again.

== Gameplay ==
A screenshot from a challenge in Skate 2 showing the player character performing a nose manual trick

Skate 2 is a skateboarding extreme sports game set in an open world environment and played from a third person perspective. The player can gain points by performing tricks, such as ollies, flip tricks, grinds and grabs. A feature returning from Skate is the "Flickit" control scheme, which requires the user to move the controller's right stick in certain patterns to perform tricks using the skateboarder's feet. Points gained from a trick are based on multiple factors, such as its height, length and complexity. The player can perform multiple tricks at a time, which are then combined into a "sequence", scoring more points than individual tricks. Performing multiple sequences starts a timer, and performing sequences within the timer creates a "line", which scores more points than performing individual sequences. Once the line timer runs out, the points gained from the line are added to the player's score.

In any of the game's modes, the player can save videos of their skater and edit the footage in the "replay editor", allowing different filters to be applied and speed of footage and the angle of the camera to be changed, among other things. This footage could be uploaded to "Skate.Reel", an online service where players could view and rate other user created videos made in Skate 2. The player can also enter the "Create-a-Spot Editor", where they can create skating "spots" using a variety of ramps, rails and other objects. The player can skate on their own spots, and could also upload them to the "Create-a-Spot Browser", where they could set the spot's high score and challenge other players to download and beat it. A graphics creator also allowed players to create custom graphics on the Skate website and download them in-game to display on shirts, boards and hats. These online features have since been discontinued. Various downloadable content packs have been released for the game, such as a "Filmer Pack" that added more replay editor options to the game.

=== Career mode ===
Skate 2's main single-player mode is the "career" mode. From the beginning of the career mode, the player can create their own custom character and have the ability to change their gender, hair colour and facial shape, as well as choose their clothes and accessories, customise their skateboard and change their skating style, among other features. The player completes challenges to progress through the career mode, such as racing against other skateboarders, doing photoshoots for magazines or entering trick competitions. Completing challenges rewards the player with money, which can be used to buy clothes and property such as skateparks, as well as bet on events. Completing enough challenge events also gains the player sponsorships from truck, wheel or shoe companies, providing the player with free gear, entry to more competitions and extra money.

As Skate 2 is set in an open world, the game's challenges can be found in its different locations. A map can be accessed in the game's pause menu, displaying challenges and locations in New San Vanelona and allowing the player to teleport directly to them. Challenges can also be retried from the map. Outside of challenges, the player can freely roam the game's environment. Certain areas in New San Vanelona are controlled by Mongocorp, called "Mongocorp zones". Security guards patrol in these areas, and if a Mongocorp security guard sees the player skateboarding in a Mongocorp zone or the player angers a civilian anywhere, they will be chased until they escape the area. The player can be knocked off their board by people they're chased by, and if a Mongocorp security guard catches the player in a Mongocorp zone, any removed caps in the area are replaced.

The player's character has the ability to jump off their skateboard and walk around, allowing them to traverse areas that are hard to skate on, such as stairs. While on foot, the player has the ability to grab onto objects such as ramps and quarter pipes and pull them around, allowing the player to skate on them in different areas. While on a skateboard, the player can also grab on to cars and be pulled around by them, called "skitching". The player have access to an in-game cell phone, which can be used to access a list of contacts. Here, the player can request services such as pool draining, removal of caps from rails in an area or temporary security in Mongocorp zones. The player can also contact any professional skateboarders met in the career mode and challenge them to a "throwdown", a game of S.K.A.T.E. "Team Film Challenges" that can be started from the cell phone, where players perform certain tricks in order to get sponsorships. The cell phone can be used to set "session markers", points where the player can teleport to quickly. Movable objects can be selected to be included in a session marker, resetting them to their initial position anytime the player teleports back to their session marker. The player has the ability to manually make their player "bail", or fall off their skateboard. While bailing, the player can rotate their character and make them move into four different positions. In the career mode, bailing enters the "Thrasher Hall of Meat" mode, where the player is tasked with damaging their character as much as possible.

=== Freeskate mode ===
Skate 2's second single-player mode, "Freeskate", allows the player to skate around New San Vanelona freely as any character unlocked in the career mode. Freeskate mode also allows the player to control settings such as density of traffic and pedestrians, and whether Mongocorp zones are active. The game also contains a local multiplayer mode, "Party Play", and an online multiplayer mode. In Party Play, two to four players can go against each other in one of three challenges. The game's online multiplayer mode allows multiple players to freeskate in a certain location together over the internet. Players can propose "freeskate activities", competitive or cooperative challenges that can be played with other players, as well as invite friends to join their current game. A "ranked" mode allows players to play against each other in one of six different modes to win money and experience points, and an "unranked" mode allows players to play ranked challenges without affecting their experience points or winning money.

== Development ==
Due to its commercial success of the original game, EA planned to make it as a franchise, as was noted by former EA president Frank Gibeau, saying that the sales of the first game "greatly exceeded" his expectations. Skate 2 was officially unveiled in May 2008.

Skate 2 was developed by EA Black Box and published by Electronic Arts. Scott Blackwood, the executive producer of the game, said that EA Black Box stayed true to the "authentic feel of the Flickit analog controls" but had given the player the ability to do "a lot more". The developers noted that areas of New New San Vanelona have more distinct architectural connections with Barcelona, Spain, San Francisco, California, and Vancouver, British Columbia than in the previous title of the series. EA Black Box and Electronic Arts promised a "seamless transition from offline to online" gameplay and a set of new competitive modes for the game.

A demo for Skate 2 was released for the Xbox 360 via the Xbox Live Marketplace and for the PlayStation 3 via the PlayStation Store. It featured a character creator and demonstrations of the career and party play modes, as well as the game's replay editor.

== Reception ==
Reception

Aggregate score
Aggregator	Score	
Aggregator	PS3	Xbox 360
Metacritic	84/100	84/100

Review scores
Publication	Score	
Publication	PS3	Xbox 360
Destructoid	7/10	N/A
Edge	7/10	7/10
Eurogamer	8/10	N/A
Game Informer	9/10	9/10
GamePro	4/5	4/5
GameRevolution	N/A	B−
GameSpot	7.5/10	7.5/10
GameSpy	4.5/5	4.5/5
GameTrailers	8/10	N/A
GameZone	8/10	8/10
Giant Bomb	4/5	4/5
IGN	(US) 8.3/10 (AU) 7.8/10	(US) 8.3/10 (AU) 7.9/10
Official Xbox Magazine (US)	N/A	8/10
PlayStation: The Official Magazine	4.5/5	N/A
411Mania	N/A	8.2/10
The A.V. Club	N/A	B+

Skate 2 received "generally favorable" reviews from critics on both platforms according to review aggregator website Metacritic.

Official Xbox Magazine said the game had good control but will be too hard for casual gamers. Game Informer said that Skate 2 accomplishes the impossible task of making old gameplay feel fresh. They said that while some new tricks were added, the game built upon the original and improved its formula.

GameSpot said that the new content was welcomed but the walking and moving objects were clumsy at best. IGN's US review praised Black Box for building upon their winning formula and keeping the gameplay fun. They explained that while the presentation is good, the story seems weak at times and the graphics are not as sharp as they could be. In Japan, Famitsu gave it a score of all four eights for a total of 32 out of 40, while Famitsu 360 gave the Xbox 360 version a score of one seven, two eights, and one seven for a total of 30 out of 40.

During the 13th Annual Interactive Achievement Awards, the Academy of Interactive Arts & Sciences nominated Skate 2 for "Outstanding Achievement in Sound Design" and "Outstanding Achievement in Soundtrack".

== Sequel ==
A sequel, Skate 3, was released in May 2010. The third game in the series has a stronger focus on online team-based gameplay and content creation than the previous games.
