= Pierre-Luc Gagnon =

Canadian skateboarder (born 1980)

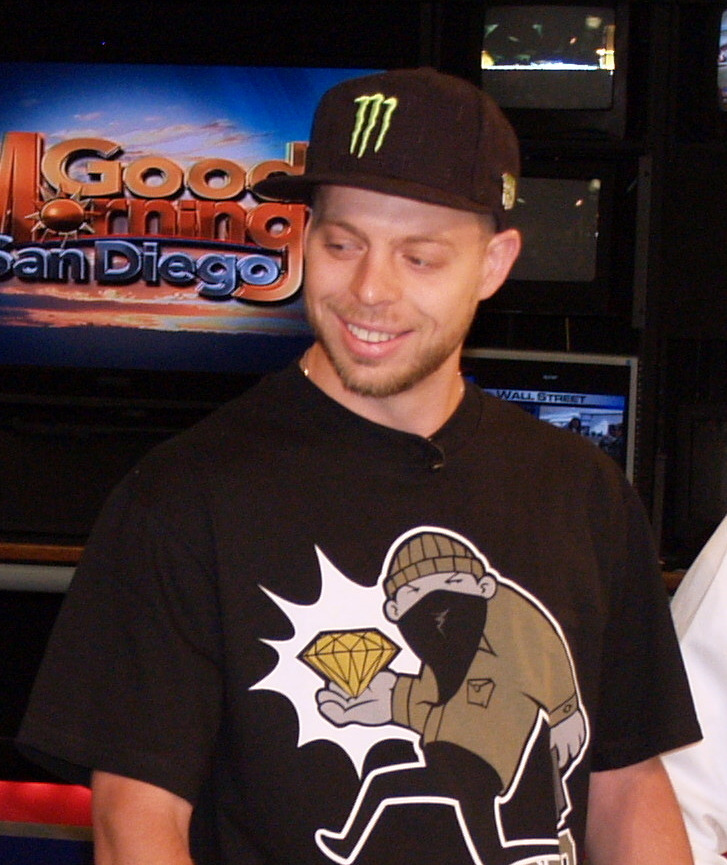
- Pierre-Luc Gagnon in San Diego in 2009

Personal information
- Full name: Pierre Luc Gagnon
- Nickname: PLG
- Born: May 2, 1980 (age 46) Boucherville, Quebec, Canada
- Height: 5 ft 9 in (1.75 m)
- Weight: 168 lb (76 kg)

Sport
- Sport: Vert, Big Air and Vert Doubles

Pierre-Luc Gagnon
Medal record

Representing Canada

Men's Skateboarding

X Games
Gold medal – first place	2002 Philadelphia	Vert
Gold medal – first place	2002 Philadelphia	Vert Best Trick
Gold medal – first place	2005 Los Angeles	Vert
Gold medal – first place	2008 Los Angeles	Vert
Gold medal – first place	2009 Los Angeles	Vert
Gold medal – first place	2010 Los Angeles	Vert
Gold medal – first place	2010 Los Angeles	Vert Best Trick
Gold medal – first place	2012 Los Angeles	Vert
Gold medal – first place	2015 Austin	Vert
Silver medal – second place	2000 San Francisco	Vert
Silver medal – second place	2000 San Francisco	Vert Doubles
Silver medal – second place	2004 Los Angeles	Big Air
Silver medal – second place	2004 Los Angeles	Vert
Silver medal – second place	2004 Los Angeles	Vert Best Trick
Silver medal – second place	2005 Los Angeles	Big Air
Silver medal – second place	2007 Los Angeles	Vert
Silver medal – second place	2011 Los Angeles	Vert
Silver medal – second place	2013 Los Angeles	Vert
Bronze medal – third place	2005 Los Angeles	Vert Best Trick
Bronze medal – third place	2007 Los Angeles	Big Air

Dew Tour (Year End Standings)
Gold medal – first place	Dew Tour 2008	Vert
Gold medal – first place	Dew Tour 2010	Vert
Gold medal – first place	Dew Tour 2011	Vert
Silver medal – second place	Dew Tour 2005	Vert
Bronze medal – third place	Dew Tour 2007	Vert
Bronze medal – third place	Dew Tour 2009	Vert

Gravity Games
Gold medal – first place	2002 Cleveland	Vert Best Trick
Silver medal – second place	2005 Woodwate	Vert Best Trick
Bronze medal – third place	2000 Providence	Vert
Bronze medal – third place	2002 Cleveland	Vert
Bronze medal – third place	2004 Cleveland	Vert

Pierre-Luc Gagnon (French pronunciation: [pjɛʁlyk ɡaɲɔ̃]; born May 2, 1980), commonly known by his initials PLG, is a Canadian professional skateboarder.

Gagnon began skating in 1988, and entered his first competition in 1992.

A frequent participant in the X-Games, he has won nineteen medals (nine gold) in the Vert, Vert Double, Big Air and Vert Best Trick categories. He has also been victorious on the Dew Tour and in the Gravity Games, and was the winner of the vert division of the Maloof Money Cup with a wide array of technical flip tricks and spins including a nollie heelflip indy 540.

Gagnon won the Skateboard Vert at the AST China Invitational in Beijing in 2008. He won his third successive X-Games gold medal and fifth overall, in 2010. Shortly after, he won his second Maloof Money Cup skateboard vert competition.

Gagnon is 5 feet 10 inches (178 cm) tall and weighs 168 pounds (76 kg). His sponsors include Darkstar skateboards, RDS clothing, Osiris Footwear, Electric visual, Monster energy drink, BOOM Headphones, Capix helmets and Harley-Davidson Motor Company.

Gagnon was a part of the cast in a VH1 reality series titled The X-Life.

== Competition wins ==
- 2002 X Games
- 2002 Gravity Games
- 2005 X Games
- 2008 AST Chinese Invitational
- 2008 X Games
- 2008 Maloof Money Cup
- 2009 X Games
- 2010 X Games
- 2010 Maloof Money Cup
- 2011 Dew Cup
- 2012 X Games
- 2015 X Games
