= Skate (upcoming video game) =

2025 video game

- Developer: Full Circle
- Publisher: Electronic Arts
- Directors: Chris Parry; Deran Chung
- Series: Skate
- Engine: Frostbite
- Platforms: PlayStation 4; PlayStation 5; Windows; Xbox One; Xbox Series X/S; Android; iOS
- Release: September 16, 2025 (early access)
- Genre: Sports
- Mode: Multiplayer

Skate (stylized as skate.), known colloquially as Skate 4, is a free-to-play skateboarding video game developed by Full Circle and published by Electronic Arts. It is a soft reboot of and the fourth main entry in the Skate series, focused on delivering a sandbox-style multiplayer experience. The game launched in early access on September 16, 2025.

== Development ==
Over a decade after the release of Skate 3, Electronic Arts announced that a fourth installment of Skate was in development. EA established Full Circle, a new studio in Vancouver, British Columbia, to lead its development. The studio was led by Daniel McCulloch, and includes Deran Chung and Cuz Parry, who had worked on the original Skate games.

The game was first revealed in 2020 during EA Play Live 2020. The game's director Chris Perry stated that a new Skate game was heavily requested by players. CEO of Electronic Arts Andrew Wilson stated that the game was believed to be "a strong candidate to employ some of the popular trends it sees inside of its existing game communities" by EA. He also stated that the game will focus on building a virtual community through cross-platform play and user-generated content.

In late August 2021, EA confirmed that the game would be available on Microsoft Windows for the first time ever in the series' history, and would also target PlayStation and Xbox consoles, as well as mobile platforms. In July 2022, the game was announced as Skate, stylized as skate. as the original game. It was also stated that the game would be free-to-play. The new Skate is set in a new city known as San Vansterdam.

In June 2024, during Summer Game Fest, a gameplay trailer for Skate was published on YouTube. The game was stated to be in a "pre-pre-alpha" version, with a promise that Full Circle is "still working on it". In June 2025, EA showcased the game's updated graphical fidelity over the alpha versions and announced that the early access would "arrive at the end of the summer".

During the closed alpha playtesting, microtransactions were added into Skate in the form of the digital currency "San Van bucks" that is used to buy in-game items. According to Full Circle, the decision to add microtransactions early on was to ensure a "positive experience when purchasing items from the Skate store". EA stated that the game would not feature any loot boxes, pay-to-win gameplay elements or paywalled locations.

== Reception ==
=== Pre-release ===
In April 2025, Full Circle stated that Skate will not have an offline mode "in order to deliver on [the team's] vision of a skateboarding world". This decision was criticized by users and various news outlets, such as PC Gamer and Rock Paper Shotgun, who both compared Skate to the 2014 online-only racing game The Crew, which got its servers shut down in 2024, rendering the game unplayable.

Luke Reilly of IGN rated the game a 4 out of 10, criticizing the game's campaign and dialogue, especially the AI companion, lack of objective variety, focus on lootboxes and incentives to buy in-game currency with real money, and the lengthy and ill-paced tutorial missions. He was also critical of the art style, noting that the city, which he deemed too small and lifeless, felt fake and uninhabited, also criticising the character design, which negatively reminded him of The Sims. To surmise, he called the game "sanitised, homogenised, and monetised", further claiming that "every part of Skate has been corporatised and Disney-fied, from art style to attitude." Writing for PC Gamer, Kara Philipps echoed many of Reilly's criticisms, claiming the game felt more like it was made "by people in suits rather than people with skateboards", being especially critical of the AI companion and the city design, noting the overabundance of "empty space and an extreme lack of NPC's make it feel desolate", also noting that the inability to actually interact with other players contributed to that notion. She concluded that with its "Fortnite-esque aesthetics and the emphasis on clumsy stunts and cheesy dialogue, the game has completely detached itself from the target audience."

On the other hand, Christian Donlan of Eurogamer lauded the return of the game's flick-it mechanics, claiming that they remained as brilliant as they were 15 years ago, noting it "brings the game to life", a point of view that Reilly shared. Unlike the latter, he was also fond of the city, which he claimed was clearly inspired by real-life locations such as Downtown Los Angeles and felt vibrant because of the many other skating players. He compared the game to an MMO in concept, noting that it had a similar design and structure, as it was mission-based yet lacked a clear final goal or story mode, giving the player the freedom to play the game their way. Like Reilly, he was critical of the games store and monetization, however; he noted that the game does not push the player to invest money. In a review for Metro, Damien Mason noted, like Donlan, that the parkour mechanics were a meaningful and fun addition to the game, as were the multiplayer structure and ragdoll physics, all of which were criticised by Reilly and Philipps. However, he was especially critical of the store system, noting that the selection of clothes players could buy with in-game currency alone looked so bad in comparison to the ones bought with premium currency that having decent clothes became a prime incentive to invest real money into the game, fearing that centering the game on a seasonal event and battlepass structure like Fortnite or Battlefield instead of skateboard culture could prove to be a mistake.

=== Accolades ===
The game was nominated for Best Early Access Game at the Golden Joystick Awards 2025.
