= Maloof Money Cup =

Annual skateboarding competition

The Maloof Money Cup was an annual skateboarding competition for amateur and professional skateboarders founded by Joe and Gavin Maloof of the Maloof family. The events were held in four cities: Costa Mesa, California, in 2008, 2009, 2010; New York City in 2010 and 2011; Washington, D.C. in 2011, and in Kimberley, South Africa, in 2011 and 2012. The aim of the competition was to raise awareness of skateboarding and to encourage participation in skateboarding events and activities. Organizers also aim to contribute new skateboarding infrastructure and boost retail activity in those areas where events are held.

== History ==
The inaugural event was held in 2008 at the OC Fair & Event Center in Orange County, California, with approximately 25,000 attendees. In 2010 the competition expanded to New York City. In 2011, events were held in New York, Washington, DC and South Africa, where the first Maloof Money Cup World Skateboarding Championships were held in Kimberley.

The event offered the largest cash prize of any skateboarding competition or event to date. Participants won up to $160,000 for winning a single event. A million dollar bonus was offered to any participant that wins four consecutive tournaments. All three of the skateparks built for the event were collaborations between event organizers, skaters, and the host cities, with the intention that the facilities would remain as permanent parks in those communities after events have been completed. World-class skateparks remain in New York City, Washington, DC, and Kimberley, South Africa.

There has not been a Maloof Money Cup event since November 2013, but there are plans for future events in the US and elsewhere.

== Money Cup Performers ==
Maloof Money Cup events also feature music performers with a variety of artists from the hip-hop, pop and rock genres. Some notable artists have appeared including Ludacris, Snoop Dogg, Lil Jon and Nelly.

== Results ==
In 2008, for the professional street skateboarding category, Paul Rodriguez placed first, while Pierre-Luc Gagnon won the vert skateboarding category. In the amateur section, Dustin Blauvelt placed first and Lacey Baker won the ladies' section.

In 2009, Chris Cole attained first place in the street section, Alex Perelson won the vert category, and Leticia Bufoni placed first in the ladies' section.

In 2010 in the California competition, Cole won again in the professional street finals, the amateur section went to Ishod Wair, and the ladies' section went to Leticia Bufoni. In the New York competition, Cole won the pro street finals and in the amateur section Felipe Gustavo won.

In 2011, in the New York event, Greg Lutzka took the pro street final win and Evan Smith took the amateur win. In Washington DC, the pro street final win went to Andrew Reynolds and the amateur win went to Ishod Wair. In the South Africa competition, the pro/open street final win went to Ishod Wair and the amateur win went to Justus Kotze.

== Maloof Skateboarding Assistance Foundation ==
The Maloof Skateboarding Assistance Foundation is a non profit organization also founded by Joe and Gavin Maloof. It was inspired when Jake Brown, a professional vert skaterboarder, took a 50-foot fall in the 2007 X Games and came out alive, with some relatively minor injuries, but for the most part unharmed. The mission of the foundation is to provide grants and financial benefit towards medical expenses for any skateboarder injured while skateboarding, to purchase policies that offer coverage above and beyond basic medical insurance for Maloof Money Cup invited skateboarders, and to build skate parks and give them to communities for local skateboarders to enjoy. The first ever event by the foundation was in 2009 and was called Ante Up for Skateboarding, a poker tournament sponsored by Monster Energy. Jake Brown won the first ever Ante Up for Skateboarding and donated all his winnings back to the program. The event was such a big success that they held it again in 2010.
