= Giovanni Reda =

Photographer & Videographer

Giovanni Luigi Reda (born February 6, 1974) is a photographer, videographer, director and skate personality internationally recognized for his work in skateboarding.

== Early life ==
Reda is from Mill Basin, Brooklyn, and went to college in Atlanta. Reda talks with a strong New York accent and is known for his sarcasm and insulting humor.

== Skateboarding ==
=== The Berrics ===
As of 2012, Reda is the staff photographer for the skateboarding website The Berrics. From 2008 to 2011, Reda produced and starred in a weekly video known as Wednesdays With Reda. In this show, he typically interviews people associated with the skateboarding industry, although he has done episodes involving celebrities or actors. Reda's last Wednesdays with Reda was in 2017.

Before working at The Berrics, Reda worked for multiple magazines, including Big Brother, Transworld Skateboarding, and Skateboarder. Reda was also the chief photographer of the Zoo York skate team for a while. In the 2000s, Giovanni Reda won Transworld Skateboarding's Photographer of the Year award (P.O.T.Y.).

=== Games ===
Reda is also known for his appearance in the Skate video game series. From the first game in 2007 until Skate 3 in 2010 he appears as the camera man and records the player character doing the main goals of the games (except for Skate 3 where he hands the role to returning Skate character Shingo).
