= Tony Hawk's Pro Skater =

1999 video game

- Developers: Neversoft (Note: Ported to Dreamcast by Treyarch, Nintendo 64 by Edge of Reality, and N-Gage by Ideaworks3D.); Natsume (GBC)
- Publisher: Activision (Note: Published for Dreamcast by Crave Entertainment, N-Gage by Nokia, and BREW by JAMDAT Mobile.)
- Producers: Scott Pease; Ralph D’Amato
- Designers: Jason Uyeda; Aaron Cammarata; Chris Rausch
- Programmer: Mick West
- Artists: Silvio Porretta; Johnny Ow; Darren Thorne
- Series: Tony Hawk's
- Platforms: PlayStation; Nintendo 64; Game Boy Color; Dreamcast; N-Gage; BREW (Verizon VCAST)
- Release: September 29, 1999: PlayStation; NA: September 29, 1999; EU: October 18, 1999 Nintendo 64; NA: March 15, 2000; EU: March 24, 2000 Game Boy Color; NA: March 21, 2000; EU: September 13, 2000 Dreamcast; NA: May 24, 2000; EU: June 29, 2000 N-Gage; EU: October 10, 2003; NA: October 13, 2003 Mobile; NA: May 5, 2005
- Genre: Sports
- Modes: Single-player, multiplayer

Tony Hawk's Pro Skater, released as Tony Hawk's Skateboarding in the United Kingdom, Australia, New Zealand, and parts of Europe, is a 1999 skateboarding video game developed by Neversoft and published by Activision. It is the first installment in the Tony Hawk's series. It was released for the PlayStation on September 29, 1999 and was later ported to the Nintendo 64, Game Boy Color, Dreamcast, and N-Gage.

Tony Hawk's Pro Skater takes place in an urban environment permeated by an ambience of punk rock and ska punk music. The player takes control of a variety of skateboarders and must complete missions by performing skateboarding tricks and collecting objects. The game offers several modes of gameplay, including a career mode in which the player must complete objectives and evolve their character's attributes, a single session, in which the player accumulates a high score within two minutes, a free skate mode in which the player may skate without any given objective, and a multiplayer mode that features a number of competitive games.

Tony Hawk's Pro Skater was met with critical acclaim for all versions except the Game Boy Color version, which had a more mixed reception. It is widely regarded as one of the greatest video games ever made, praised for its innovative gameplay, soundtrack, and influence on the skateboarding genre. The game resulted in a successful franchise, receiving eight annualized sequels developed by Neversoft from Pro Skater 2 (2000) to Proving Ground (2007). It is also credited with introducing skateboarding to a more mainstream global audience. It received a remake (Note: Sources vary over its classification as a remake or a remaster. Official literature refers to the game as a "remaster", but reviews of the game also refer to it as a complete remake as it was redeveloped from the ground up.) along with the sequel, Tony Hawk's Pro Skater 1 + 2, in 2020.

== Gameplay ==
The player, as Tony Hawk, has collected all the letters of the word "SKATE". This screenshot is taken from the Dreamcast version.

Tony Hawk's Pro Skater puts the player in control of a skateboarder and takes place in a third-person view with a fixed camera. The goal of the game is to perform tricks and combinations thereof in an effort to increase the player's score. Movement can be altered using the d-pad or analog stick, and ollies, grabs, flips and grinds are each assigned to individual buttons. Each skateboarder has eight grabs, eight grinds and eight flips. The number of points earned from a successful trick sequence is dependent on the amount of time spent in the air, the degree of rotation, and the number and variety of tricks performed; the more a single trick is performed in a sequence, the fewer points it will earn. When the player succeeds in performing tricks, a special gauge increases. When this gauge is full and flashing, the player is capable of performing a special trick that is worth many more points than ordinary tricks. If the player bails (falls off their skateboard), any points that may have been earned from the current combo are lost, and the special gauge is emptied.

In the game's "Career Mode", the player must complete five objectives (represented by VHS tapes) in each level within a period of two minutes. The player is not obligated to complete all the objectives within a single run; any completed objective is committed to the game's memory, which allows other objectives to be completed within multiple playthroughs of a level. Two common objectives in each level are achieved by accumulating two defined scores, which gradually increases in difficulty throughout the game; while one other common objective is to collect letters of the word "SKATE". Another common objective is to destroy five of a certain object within each level. The fifth objective involves collecting a VHS tape hidden in the level. Completing objectives unlocks additional levels and equipment for use. Three of the mode's levels take place in a competition setting in which the player performs for judges and accumulates the highest score within three one-minute rounds. The player receives a bronze, silver or gold medal depending on the final score they are given. Other single-player modes include the "Single Session", in which the player can freely accumulate a high score within two minutes using any previously obtained levels and characters, and the "Free Skate", in which there is no time limit imposed.

The multiplayer mode is played by two players in a split screen view and offers three games: "Graffiti", "Trick Attack", and "HORSE". In "Graffiti", players must accumulate the highest score by changing level elements into their own color via the use of tricks. If a player performs a higher-scoring trick on an element that has already been marked, the element will change to that player's color. "Trick Attack" is a mode in which players must accumulate the highest score by chaining tricks together. "HORSE" is a game that is played intermittently between two players, who must compete in rounds lasting either eight seconds or until a trick has been made. The player with the lower score on any given turn receives a letter in the word "HORSE" or whatever word the players have generated prior to the game's start. The first player to accumulate the entire word loses.

=== Featured pro skaters ===
The game features a total of ten real life professional skateboarders, along with two unlockable original characters: Officer Dick and Private Carrera.

Featured pro skaters
Bob Burnquist; Kareem Campbell; Rune Glifberg; Tony Hawk; Bucky Lasek	Chad Muska; Andrew Reynolds; Geoff Rowley; Elissa Steamer; Jamie Thomas

== Development ==
Following the releases of arcade game Top Skater (1997) by Sega and PlayStation game Street Sk8er (1998) by Electronic Arts, Activision identified skateboarding-simulation games as a growing market in the gaming industry and concluded that such a game would resonate with a young audience. Preceding Neversoft's involvement in the project, the task of developing a skateboarding game for Activision was initially given to another studio. However, this studio's attempt did not impress Activision and the game did not move past the concept stage. Activision then decided to entrust the project to Neversoft, which had recently completed the third-person shooter game Apocalypse (1998) within nine months. Although Neversoft had never developed a sports video game before, the development team was confident in its ability to accomplish the task before its given deadline of the 1999 Christmas season.

During development, the Neversoft team would spend their lunch breaks at a bowling alley near the studio, where they would play and subsequently study from Sega's Top Skater in the arcade. The game's design served as a strong basic influence, along with observances of real skaters performing in the X Games, which were taking place during the game's development. Although the team decided early on that Top Skater's linearity lacked the sense of fun they aimed for, the "racetrack" element was retained in two of the game's final levels. Contrary to subsequent games in the series, Neversoft did not primarily focus on using pre-existing locations as reference for the game's level design, but simply envisioned potential skating areas such as a school or a city and incorporated elements such as ramps and rails to benefit the gameplay. The team consciously prioritized fun over realism in the approach to the game's level design and physics.

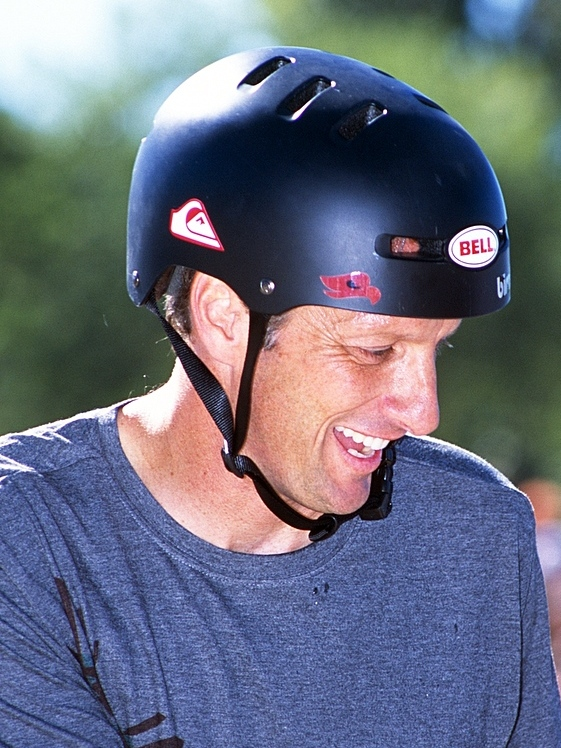
Tony Hawk, the game's namesake, in 2006

The game's engine is a modified version of Neversoft's previous game Apocalypse, and the game's prototype used Bruce Willis's character from that game as the placeholder player character. Once the prototype reached a functional and demonstrable state, the Neversoft team realized that they would require a professional skateboarder to aid in the remainder of production. At the time, Tony Hawk had been a popular figure within skateboarding for quite some time. In September 1998, Activision established contact with Hawk and arranged a meeting between him and Neversoft. Hawk was quickly impressed by the design team members' devotion to skateboarding, the controls and engine of their game's early build and agreed to lend his name and involvement to the production. Subsequently, Hawk would turn down Activision's offer of a one-time buyout for the permanent use of his name and likeness on the game in favor of a royalty deal, in which Hawk would earn a percentage for every copy sold. As a result of the series' eventual success, Hawk would earn ten times Activision's initial offer within two years. By January 1999, Activision publicly announced their agreement with Hawk to include him in the game. Activision senior vice president Mitch Lasky, in an interview with GameSpot, stated that the character was "meant to reflect Tony's signature style – an intense mix of acrobatics and hard-core technical skating". Hawk remarked that "[he had] always wanted to help create a video game that represented the reality and excitement of professional skateboarding".

Hawk would spend the development time periodically playing through the game's beta builds and providing feedback, using a specially modified PlayStation console that can play games burned on CD-Rs. Hawk even went so far as to purposely send advance copies of the game to a trusted group of people who also owned modchipped PlayStations: "I had a modified PlayStation so I could use burned discs, and they'd send me new developments and we'd go back and forth. I'd let people play it, people that I trust. At one point, I felt it was getting so far along that I started to sneak out copies for those same people - these people had modded PlayStations. As subversive as that was, it started to create a buzz in the industry, because they were key players in the skating industry and they were also hardcore gamers". Hawk would also personally select a group of other professional skaters to include as playable characters based on their skills, personalities and diversity; each skater received a cut of the royalties and got to select their own attire and special tricks for the game. While animating the skaters, the design team largely depended on using available video footage as reference. The incorporation of motion capture was attempted to aid in the realism of the animation, but due to the technology's infancy, the result was ultimately determined to have not translated as well as what had already been animated. The 900 featured in the game was itself drawn from footage of Hawk's famed performance of the feat in the X Games that summer, and was a relatively late addition as a result.

The collection of VHS tapes was directly inspired by the collection of stars in Super Mario 64 (1996). In designing the objectives, the team would gather at a table, draw a level and then ask what could be done within said level, upon which the team members would provide ideas. Rejected concepts arising from these sessions include levels taking place on a highway and a jetty, and even a scenario in which the player would lose a wheel and have to skate on three wheels. Manuals were originally intended to be implemented into the game, but were omitted due to time constraints; manuals would subsequently be included in Tony Hawk's Pro Skater 2.

=== Promotion and release ===
Elissa Steamer's inclusion in the game, along with the game's final release date of September 29, was presented on August 26, 1999. A playable demo with only two available skaters was integrated into the Jampack Summer '99 compilation CD released by PlayStation Underground. The game was made available for pre-order two weeks prior to the game's release; those who pre-ordered the game at Electronics Boutique or FuncoLand respectively received a miniature replica of Tony Hawk's Birdhouse skateboard, a sticker sheet featuring the game's ten professional skaters and a game tip on the back of each sticker. A second playable demo was included on a promotional compilation disc released by Pizza Hut on November 14.

While Neversoft would begin development of the game's sequel, Tony Hawk's Pro Skater 2, shortly before the release of the first game, Activision would entrust the game's Nintendo 64 port to Edge of Reality, which had recently ported Monster Truck Madness 2 to the same system. The Nintendo 64 and Game Boy Color versions received a multi-million dollar advertising campaign on several major youth-targeted channels in the United States beginning in April 2000. Customers who purchased the Game Boy Color version at Toys "R" Us or FuncoLand received a special-edition miniature skateboard.

As a result of the disappointing sales of Blue Stinger, Activision was discouraged from publishing further games for the Dreamcast and relinquished the distribution of Tony Hawk's Pro Skater on the console to Crave Entertainment. After online speculation and teasing comments from company insiders, a port for the Dreamcast was revealed to be developed by Treyarch. Later in 2003, the N-Gage version was in development. The game came bundled with the N-Gage QD that was released in 2004.

== Ports ==
The Nintendo 64 port of Tony Hawk's Pro Skater was developed by Edge of Reality and released on March 15, 2000. While the port is largely faithful to the original version and retains all game modes, characters and levels, the game's soundtrack was severely truncated and the voices were removed to accommodate the lessened space in the cartridge format. The blood effects had also been removed, so Nintendo could market the game with an "E" game rating. The Dreamcast version was developed by Treyarch, published by Crave Entertainment and released on May 24, 2000. The graphics and animations in the Dreamcast version are improved from those in the PlayStation version.

Tony Hawk's Pro Skater on Game Boy Color

The Game Boy Color version was developed by the Japanese company Natsume and released on March 30, 2000. The Game Boy Color version is an adaptation rather than a true port of the PlayStation version due to the limited capacity of the platform. The game offers two different gameplay styles: an overhead view with vertical scrolling, and a side-scrolling view in which there is a ramp on each side. There are four gameplay modes in which the player can only perform a few tricks. In "Half Pipe Mode", the player must attempt to achieve the highest score possible. "Tournament Mode" is a five-level vertically scrolling game in which the player must race against three computer-controlled skaters and achieve the highest rank. Jumps are made automatically when the player maneuvers onto ramps, and tricks are displayed as a brief static image. "Versus Mode" and "Rival Mode" are identical to "Tournament Mode", except the player plays in a single level against a single opponent; the opponent in "Rival Mode" is computer-controlled, while the opponent in "Versus Mode" is human, which necessitates the use of a Game Link Cable.

The N-Gage version was developed by Ideaworks3D and released on October 13, 2003, a week following the launch of the N-Gage. The game is a faithful port of the PlayStation version and retains most of the characters, levels, control scheme and original music while adding levels from Tony Hawk's Pro Skater 2 and two multiplayer games. The game's multiplayer functions via the N-Gage's Bluetooth feature. The N-Gage version was named "Best-Mobile Game" by the British Academy of Film and Television Arts in 2004.

A remake of both the first game and Tony Hawk's Pro Skater 2, titled Tony Hawk's Pro Skater 1 + 2, was developed by Vicarious Visions and released on September 4, 2020, for PlayStation 4, Windows, and Xbox One, followed up a year later on PlayStation 5, Xbox Series X/S, and Nintendo Switch. The remake includes all of the original levels and skaters from the original games, but also includes improved skater creation and park creation modes, online multiplayer, and other new features, and featuring most of the original soundtracks, with a few exceptions due to licensing issues.

== Reception ==
Reception

Aggregate scores
Aggregator	Score
GameRankings	(DC) 94% (PS) 94% (N64) 92% (N-G) 77% (GBC) 63%
Metacritic	(PS) 92/100

Review scores
Publication	Score
AllGame	(DC, N64, PS) 4.5/5
Electronic Gaming Monthly	(PS) 8.38/10
GamePro	(PS) 5/5
GameRevolution	(PS) A (N64) 5/5
GameSpot	(DC) 9.5/10 (PS) 9.3/10 (N64) 9.1/10 (GBC) 7.1/10 (N-G) 6.8/10
IGN	(DC) 9.8/10 (PS) 9.4/10 (N64) 9.1/10 (N-G) 8.8/10 (GBC) 5/10
Next Generation	(PS) 5/5 (N64) 5/5 (DC) 5/5

Tony Hawk's Pro Skater was met with critical acclaim. Doug Perry of IGN praised the game's "imaginative, deep, and amazingly addictive" gameplay, "steady and consistent" learning curve, "intuitive and natural" controls, large and complex levels, "jaw-dropping" physics and "perfect" soundtrack. Perry concluded that the game had "captured the pure grit and radical feel of skateboarding, delivering it in near perfect form onto the PlayStation with a mastery and sense of programming finesse beyond anyone's imagination", and described the game as "that rare gem of a game that defies what other developers say can't be done". Jeff Gerstmann of GameSpot commended the game's graphics, frame rate, camera and sound effects, and declared the game to be "a worthy addition to anyone's PlayStation collection", though he was not personally fond of the soundtrack and wished that there was more variety in the game's tricks. He additionally noted that the Dreamcast version used the console's hardware to its advantage by displaying clearer textures and a smoother frame rate "that may very well cause longtime fans of the game to weep". Chris Carle of IGN also praised the Dreamcast version's improved textures.

Matt Casamassina of IGN praised the Nintendo 64 version's visuals as "very impressive" in spite of the reduced quality of the textures and the omitted full-motion video effects, and the audio as "surprisingly clear", albeit compressed and "dumbed down" to accommodate the cartridge format. Martin Taylor of Eurogamer cited the game's graphics as "crisp, smooth and very, very hard to fault", but noted that the game's soundtrack suffered from the compression process and that the looping music "quickly becomes incredibly annoying"; the latter sentiment was mirrored by Dr. Moo of Game Revolution.

In reviewing the Game Boy Color version, Craig Harris of IGN decided that while the half-pipe portion of the game "isn't half-bad", the overhead portion is "absolutely stupid"; he criticized the representation of tricks as static images as "completely destroy[ing] the flow of the game", and noted that the issue is exacerbated in the "Versus" mode by having both parties' game pause when either one performs a trick. Frank Provo of GameSpot cited the game's lack of level variety and "borderline mediocre" audio, but felt that it was the best skateboarding game to be made for a portable console. Both Chadd Chambers of IGN and Jeff Gerstmann of GameSpot considered the N-Gage version to be the best game available on the system and were relatively impressed by the game's graphics, but noted the less comfortable control scheme and reduced sound quality.

Three reviewers for Next Generation magazine - Blake Fischer, Eric Bratcher, and Greg Orlando - gave five stars out of five for PlayStation, Nintendo 64, and Dreamcast versions, respectively. They praised virtually every aspect of the game, despite noting some minor differences between all three versions.

Tony Hawk's Pro Skater was ranked #36 in Game Informer's "Top 100 Games of All Time" in its 100th issue in August 2001. The game was nominated for "Console Game of the Year" and "Console Sports Game of the Year" during the 3rd Annual Interactive Achievement Awards, but lost to Soulcalibur and Knockout Kings 2000, respectively. The game was included on Polygon's 2017 list of The 500 Best Games of All Time.

=== Sales ===
Tony Hawk's Pro Skater was the third highest-selling PlayStation game of November 1999 in the United States. From its release date to late-December 1999, the game shipped in excess of 350,000 units and was available in over 10,000 retailers nationwide. The PlayStation version of Tony Hawk's Pro Skater received a "Platinum" sales award from the Entertainment and Leisure Software Publishers Association (ELSPA), indicating sales of at least 300,000 copies in the United Kingdom. The Verband der Unterhaltungssoftware Deutschland gave the PlayStation version a Gold Award for 100,000 sold copies in Germany by February 2000. The PlayStation versions of Tony Hawk's Pro Skater and its successor were respectively the third and second highest-selling console games of 2000. The Nintendo 64 version was the sixth highest-selling Nintendo 64 game in the United States during the week of November 19–26, 2000. As of 2001, it has sold 3.5 million units.

== Sequels ==
The game resulted in a successful franchise, receiving eight annualized sequels developed by Neversoft from Pro Skater 2 (2000) to Proving Ground (2007), and a 2020 remake along with the sequel, Tony Hawk's Pro Skater 1 + 2.

== Cultural impact ==
Tony Hawk's Pro Skater is credited with introducing skateboarding to a more mainstream global audience.

In a 2023 essay for The New York Times Magazine, Irish writer Jack Sheehan reflected on the game's impact, writing: "Released at a moment when skateboarding was beginning to go mainstream, T.H.P.S. became popular because it invited skaters and nonskaters alike to feel the thrill of getting air, doing a kick flip or landing a trick by the thinnest margin." In 2023, the book Right, Down + Circle: Tony Hawk’s Pro Skater by Cole Nowicki was released, tackling and analyzing Tony Hawk's Pro Skater's meaning and impact. Reflecting on both the game's development history and his personal experience as a skateboarder and player, Nowicki called the game an "unprecedented success" and a "Trojan horse, entering the homes of millions worldwide, exposing kids, teenagers, their parents, and more to this gamified version of skateboarding."

In 2020, a documentary film Pretending I'm Superman: The Tony Hawk Video Game Story from Swedish director Ludvig Gür was released, chronicling the development and impact of the game.

Throughout the 2010s and 2020s, the game's soundtrack was acknowledged as having been a major cultural influence in music, particularly in spreading punk and metal to millennials.
