= Neversoft =

American video game developer

Neversoft Entertainment, Inc.
- Final logo, used from 2013 to 2014
- Type: Subsidiary
- Industry: Video games
- Founded: July 1994; 32 years ago
- Founder: Joel Jewett; Mick West; Chris Ward
- Defunct: July 10, 2014; 12 years ago
- Fate: Merged with Infinity Ward
- Successor: Infinity Ward
- Headquarters: Woodland Hills, Los Angeles, California, US
- Key people: Joel Jewett (studio head); Scott Pease (studio director)
- Products: Tony Hawk's series (1999–2007); Guitar Hero series (2007–2010); Full list of games
- Number of employees: 120 (2014)
- Parent: Activision (1999–2014)
- Website: Archived official website at the Wayback Machine (archived July 20, 2013)

Neversoft Entertainment, Inc. was an American video game developer based in Woodland Hills, California. The studio was founded by Joel Jewett, Mick West and Chris Ward in July 1994, and was acquired by Activision in October 1999. Initially, the studio worked with Playmates Toys, where it worked on the game Skeleton Warriors (1996), which was based on an animated television series of the same name. Throughout 1996, the studio grew, and worked on projects with Crystal Dynamics and Sony Computer Entertainment, but due to internal conflicts, they were cancelled.

After a meeting with Activision in 1998, the publisher agreed to enter into a deal with the studio to create Apocalypse, which used the game engine created by Neversoft for one of the cancelled Sony projects. During the game's development, Activision asked the studio to work on a prototype for a skateboarding game, and after an impressed reaction from Activision to the prototype, the publisher released the game as Tony Hawk's Pro Skater in 1999 to critical acclaim and acquired Neversoft at the end of that year. Neversoft developed a Spider-Man game for the PlayStation the following year, along with six Tony Hawk's games over the next several years.

In 2004, the company split into two teams to work on two games at once, the upcoming Tony Hawk's and a new intellectual property, the western action-adventure game Gun. After Activision's acquisition of Guitar Hero in 2006, Neversoft continued the franchise, working on Guitar Hero III: Legends of Rock, which was released in 2007 to similar acclaim to previous games in the franchise. With the game's success, Neversoft focused on developing new Guitar Hero games, passing development of new Tony Hawk's to Robomodo. The last game in the franchise by Neversoft was Guitar Hero: Warriors of Rock in 2010, which received mixed reviews and sold poorly. Due to this, Activision reduced Neversoft to a support studio for future Call of Duty games.

Starting in 2011, the studio worked in collaboration with numerous Activision studios on Call of Duty: Modern Warfare 3, where they worked on the Chaos Mode DLC, and then in Call of Duty: Ghosts (2013), where they worked on the Extinction mode. Following the release of the latter, Neversoft was merged with Infinity Ward on May 3, 2014, and was made defunct on July 10, 2014. The last game the studio worked on was Call of Duty: Advanced Warfare, developed with Sledgehammer Games and released later that year.

== History ==
Neversoft was founded in July 1994 by three employees of Malibu Interactive (previously Acme Interactive), a division of Malibu Comics based in Westlake Village, California. At that time, the primary platforms were the home gaming consoles, the Genesis/Mega Drive and the Super Nintendo Entertainment System. Games for these systems could be developed by small teams, anywhere from two to ten developers. As a result, it was much easier than at present to set up a game development company, and several groups of people had already left Malibu to strike out on their own. Joel Jewett, a native of Montana and a CPA, was at the time head of development at the rapidly shrinking Malibu Interactive. He teamed up with Mick West, a game programmer, who had just completed working on BattleTech: A Game of Armored Combat for the Genesis, and Chris Ward, a video game artist.

In July 1994, Neversoft was formed. They initially found work for Playmates Interactive, a then-division of Playmates Toys who were about to release a line of toys called Skeleton Warriors and wanted a video game to go along with the toys and the cartoon series. Neversoft began work on the game design and moved into offices in Woodland Hills, California. Neversoft worked on the Genesis version for five months. Over that time it hired another artist and a level designer. In December 1994, Playmates cancelled the game. It was not unhappy with the progress, but had decided that it needed to develop the game for the Sega Saturn. 1995 was spent developing Skeleton Warriors for the Sega Saturn. Over the course of 1995, Neversoft grew rapidly by hiring three programmers, five artists, a level designer, a tester and an office administrator. Skeleton Warriors was finished in time for the 1995 holiday season and Neversoft began looking for other work while it ported Skeleton Warriors to the PlayStation in 1996.

Neversoft continued to expand during 1996, expanding to over twenty employees. They worked for six months on a game based on Ghost Rider for Crystal Dynamics, which was cancelled due to financial problems with the publisher. With some excess capacity Neversoft started to develop a game of its own design, initially called Big Guns. The technology developed there was used in its next project, a conversion of the PC game MDK. Towards the end of 1996, Neversoft sold the idea for Big Guns to Sony Computer Entertainment and it began development. 1997 was a tumultuous year for Neversoft. The MDK conversion took far longer than expected, and the Big Guns game (renamed Exodus) went through numerous design changes at the behest of Sony and was cancelled in November 1997. The company shrunk back to just twelve employees. Neversoft spent the next few months shopping around its technology, meeting with numerous companies and looking for work.

In January 1998, just as Neversoft was about to run out of money, it had a meeting with Activision, who were looking for someone to re-develop Apocalypse, a failed internal project. The technology developed for Big Guns turned out to be ideal for the project, Activision was impressed and Neversoft began work on Apocalypse. In May 1998, Apocalypse was going very well, and Activision signed up Neversoft to develop a prototype for a skateboarding game. This proceeded slowly as it could not spare many people from Apocalypse. The initial prototypes resembled the arcade game Top Skater. Apocalypse wrapped up in October 1998 and development began in earnest on Tony Hawk's Pro Skater for the PlayStation. By the end of 1998, the game development was in full swing and Neversoft comprised 16 people: six programmers, five artists, three level designers, one producer and Joel, the company's president.

From 1999 to 2007, Neversoft developed nine Tony Hawk's Pro Skater games and increased its employees to over 150.

In 2005, Neversoft developed a Western action-adventure open world game entitled Gun, alongside Beenox and Rebellion Developments.

In 2006, Activision acquired RedOctane and its Guitar Hero series, and chose Neversoft as the developer. Neversoft developed several games in the franchise, breaking several records with Guitar Hero III: Legends of Rock. The games following Guitar Hero: Warriors of Rock would be developed by Vicarious Visions, developers of the Wii ports and Guitar Hero: Van Halen. In light of this, 50 employees were laid off on February 11, 2010. In May 2014 it was reported that Neversoft had been merged with Call of Duty creators Infinity Ward to create what was internally referred to as a "super-studio".

Neversoft was officially made defunct on July 10, 2014, 20 years to the day of its founding, with the remaining employees attending a burning of a sculpture of the skewered eyeball from its logo that has been part of its offices before.

== Release history ==
Tony Hawk's Pro Skater (THPS) was released on the PlayStation in August 1999. Development of a sequel began immediately after its release. Spider-Man was also developed for Activision in 2000. Like THPS, the technology for this game was based on the Apocalypse engine, which was in turn based on the Big Guns engine. Neversoft was now developing two major games in parallel, and expanded into two large teams. Activision acquired Neversoft in the summer of 1999 in a stock swap deal. The founders of Neversoft and several key employees signed four-year employment agreements.

Tony Hawk's Pro Skater 2 and Spider-Man were both released in 2000. Neversoft began work on Tony Hawk's Pro Skater 3 specifically for the PlayStation 2. After both teams finished their projects they were merged into one large team. THPS3 was developed using the RenderWare game engine. Tony Hawk's Pro Skater 3 was released in 2001, followed by Tony Hawk's Pro Skater 4 in 2002. In 2003 Neversoft reworked the game with a more story-oriented approach in Tony Hawk's Underground, followed by a sequel in Tony Hawk's Underground 2 in 2004. In 2005 Neversoft again split into two teams to begin work on the internally developed Gun and the seventh version of the Tony Hawk's series — Tony Hawk's American Wasteland.

Tony Hawk's Project 8 was developed and released in 2006. This was the first title under Neversoft that was developed as a next-gen title for the Xbox 360 and the PlayStation 3. Tony Hawk's Proving Ground was released in 2007. It is the second title for the PlayStation 3 and third for Xbox 360 in the Tony Hawk's series. It was the last Tony Hawk game to be developed by Neversoft; the franchise moved to Robomodo.

After Activision acquired RedOctane and the Guitar Hero series, Harmonix developed its last Guitar Hero game, Guitar Hero Encore: Rocks the 80s, before it was acquired by MTV. Neversoft became the developer for the Guitar Hero series beginning with Guitar Hero III: Legends of Rock for the Xbox 360 and PlayStation 3 consoles, using its in-house game engine which powered most entries in the Tony Hawk's series for sixth- and seventh-generation consoles instead of Harmonix's engine. Several Guitar Hero series games have been developed by Neversoft since 2007, including Guitar Hero III: Legends of Rock, Guitar Hero: Aerosmith, Guitar Hero World Tour (incorporating drums and vocals alongside guitar), Guitar Hero: Metallica, Guitar Hero 5, Band Hero and Guitar Hero: Warriors of Rock.

== Games developed ==
=== Original works ===
Year	Game	Platform(s)
1996	Skeleton Warriors	Sega Saturn, PlayStation
1998	Apocalypse	PlayStation
1999	Tony Hawk's Pro Skater	PlayStation
2000	Spider-Man	PlayStation
2000	Tony Hawk's Pro Skater 2	PlayStation
2001	Tony Hawk's Pro Skater 3	PlayStation 2, GameCube, Xbox
2002	Tony Hawk's Pro Skater 4	PlayStation 2, GameCube, Xbox
2003	Tony Hawk's Underground	PlayStation 2, GameCube, Xbox
2004	Tony Hawk's Underground 2	PlayStation 2, GameCube, Xbox
2005	Tony Hawk's American Wasteland	PlayStation 2, GameCube, Xbox, Xbox 360
2005	Gun	PlayStation 2, GameCube, Xbox, Xbox 360
2006	Tony Hawk's Project 8	PlayStation 3, Xbox 360
2007	Tony Hawk's Proving Ground	PlayStation 3, Xbox 360
2007	Guitar Hero III: Legends of Rock	PlayStation 3, Xbox 360
2008	Guitar Hero: Aerosmith	PlayStation 3, Xbox 360
2008	Guitar Hero World Tour	PlayStation 3, Xbox 360
2009	Guitar Hero: Metallica	PlayStation 3, Xbox 360
2009	Guitar Hero 5	PlayStation 3, Xbox 360
2009	Band Hero	PlayStation 3, Xbox 360
2010	Guitar Hero: Warriors of Rock	PlayStation 3, Xbox 360

=== Port and support work ===
Year	Game	Platform(s)
1997	MDK (Note: Original game developed for PC by Shiny Entertainment; Neversoft developed the PlayStation port.)	PlayStation
2011	Call of Duty: Modern Warfare 3 (Note: Developed with Infinity Ward and Sledgehammer Games; Neversoft developed the Chaos Mode for Survival Mode and helped Infinity Ward with the single player campaign.)	Microsoft Windows, PlayStation 3, Xbox 360, Wii
2013	Call of Duty: Ghosts (Note: Developed with Infinity Ward; Neversoft developed the game's Extinction mode.)	Microsoft Windows, PlayStation 3, Xbox 360, Wii U, PlayStation 4, Xbox One
2014	Call of Duty: Advanced Warfare (Note: Developed with Sledgehammer Games; Neversoft provided development support and was dissolved into Infinity Ward ahead of the game's release.)	Microsoft Windows, PlayStation 3, PlayStation 4, Xbox 360, Xbox One

=== Cancelled games ===
Year	Game	Platform(s)
1996	Ghost Rider	PlayStation
1997	Big Guns (Exodus)	PlayStation
2013	Call of Duty: Future Warfare (Note: Cancelled Call of Duty spinoff. Neversoft developed two or three campaign missions and a multiplayer mode before the project was scrapped.)	Xbox 360
