= Skeleton Warriors =

American 1994 animated television series

- Genre: Action; Horror; Science Fantasy
- Created by: Gary Goddard
- Developed by: Eric Lewald; Julia Jane Lewald; Len Uhley; Steve Cuden
- Starring: Jeff Bennett; Nathan Carlson; Philip L. Clarke; Michael Corbett; Jennifer Hale; Tony Jay; Danny Mann; Valery Pappas; Kevin Schon
- Music by: Gary Guttman
- Country of origin: United States
- Original language: English
- No. of seasons: 1
- No. of episodes: 13

Production
- Executive producers: Gary Goddard; Stephanie Graziano
- Producers: Victor Dal Chele; Robert De Lapp
- Running time: 23 minutes
- Production companies: Landmark Entertainment Group; Graz Entertainment Inc.

Original release
- Network: CBS (USA); TCC (UK); Italia 1 (Italy)
- Release: September 17 – December 10, 1994

Skeleton Warriors is an American animated series created by Landmark Entertainment Group, which originally aired in 1994 on CBS and consists of 13 episodes. The show was created by producer Gary Goddard.

== Summary ==
The story takes place on the fictional distant planet of "Luminaire". The conflict of the plot revolves around the need to control the Lightstar Crystal, which powers the great city of Luminicity. Baron Dark, the show's main villain, tried to steal the crystal in order to gain control over its incredible power. He only succeeded in obtaining half of the crystal, with the other half being obtained by Prince Lightstar.

The half of the crystal that Baron Dark managed to obtain turns him into a living skeleton. It also gives him the power to turn those with evil hearts into living skeletons for his army. Each episode involves Prince Lightstar, his siblings and Baron Dark attempting to obtain the other half of their respective crystals in order to gain control over the planet.

Prince Lightstar forms part of the "Legion of Light." It consists of Justin Lightstar a.k.a. Prince Lightstar, Joshua Lightstar a.k.a. Grimskull, and Jennifer Steele a.k.a. Talyn. They also have been endowed with great powers through their half of the Crystal. They team together with their uncle Ursak (a.k.a. Guardian) to battle the evil Baron Dark. While Baron Dark is transformed into an undead skeleton and given the ability to transform other living beings into his Skeleton Warriors, the Legion of Light gains other fantastic abilities: Lightstar gains the ability to channel energy through his hands, Talyn gains the power of flight, and Grimskull is transformed into an undead creature similar to the Baron, but also has the power to travel through shadows.

== Characters ==
=== Legion of Light ===
- Justin Steele/Prince Lightstar

Voiced by: Jeff Bennett

Prince Justin is the leader of the Legion of Light and the one meant to protect the Lightstar Crystal. After its loss, he continually strives to protect humanity and defeat the skeleton warriors. He greatly frustrates the Baron by displaying the clear limits to his power: a person of good heart cannot be turned into a skeleton warrior. When the Lightstar Crystal was shattered, Justin received the ability to project powerful beams of energy out of his hands or through his sword, which later is declared by Ursak to be (or possibly contain, considering the relative sizes of the sword and crystal) an actual piece of the Lightstar Crystal.

- Jennifer Steele/Talyn

Voiced by: Jennifer Hale

Talyn is a fierce warrior, a gracious princess, a caring soul, and an unwavering defender of the righteous. She somehow manages to combine all her devotion to the fight against evil with great compassion. After the struggle which shattered the Lightstar Crystal, she was granted the power of flight and managed to reconcile Justin and Joshua. Her later exploits include finding a way to actually restore skeleton warriors to the flesh – by removing the "heart gems" that appear after the transformation. Although this discovery is a tactical advantage and a source of hope, it also spurred Baron Dark on to worse acts; if any skeleton warrior is restored to human form, he could use his power to transform them back into skeletons, but, since he was the only one who possessed this power, if he himself was restored, no one else would be able to transform him back into a living skeleton.

- Joshua Steele/Grimskull

Voiced by: Michael Corbett

Justin's younger brother, who initially worked together with Baron Dark out of misplaced envy of his older brother. When Justin and Dark struggled for the Lightstar Crystal, Joshua interfered. The resulting surge of power turned him into an undead creature, but where Dark and his Skeleton Warriors are pure skeletons, Joshua - who was renamed Grimskull - is still covered in flesh. Grimskull is seeking redemption by helping his family; he saw the baron's evil during the fight which transformed him. Grimskull is granted the power to travel through shadows wherever he wishes. After his transformation, he befriended a wolf, which he named "Stalker."

- Ursak the Guardian

Voiced by: Kevin Schon

Ursak is the brother to the late king and the uncle to the Steele children. He serves as their adviser, second-in-command, mentor, and surrogate father. He is a skilled combatant who leads from the front, as well as a highly competent scientist designing various weapons and armor for the Legion of Light's members.

=== Skeleton Warriors ===
- Baron Dark

Voiced by: Philip L. Clarke

The greedy and evil baron tried to seize the Lightstar crystal for himself and caused it to break in two. His half turned him into a living skeleton who has the power to turn any person with the slightest bit of darkness in his or her heart into a skeleton warrior like himself. Baron turns them into skeleton warriors with "Heartstones," and he says "Darkest Soul, Evil's Courier, Serve me as a Skeleton Warrior." He is obsessed with defeating the Legion of Light and taking control of both halves of the Lightstar Crystal, thereby granting absolute power for himself.

- Dr. Cyborn

Voiced by: Nathan Carlson

Dr. Cyborn is a half skeleton/half-machine who was Baron Dark's scientific expert and high-tech weapon maker. Dr. Cyborn is the Skeleton Legion's mad scientist and is Baron Dark's second-in-command. Self-created in his demented laboratory, Dr. Cyborn grafted bionic parts to his own body after a near-fatal accident. The scientist's dream came true when Baron Dark gave him his skeletal form. Now, this twisted genius serves the Baron as he devises weapons to destroy the Legion of Light.

- Shriek

Voiced by: Valery Pappas

Previously a stunningly beautiful woman, Shriek with her evil heart was transformed into a female Skeleton Warrior in order to "add a woman's touch," according to Baron Dark. In the days prior to becoming a living Skeleton, Shriek was powerfully attracted to Prince Justin. After she became a Skeleton Warrior her crush persists, albeit unreciprocated. According to the Skeleton Warriors presentation at Toy Fair 1994, the character's working name was "Banshee."

- Aracula

An arachnid-like creature possessing six arms before being turned into a Skeleton Warrior, Aracula speaks almost entirely in grunts, screeches, and other animal-like sounds. He serves mostly as a bodyguard and berserker-type fighter who tries to overwhelm his opponent through sheer brute force. He maintains his spider abilities despite being a skeleton. In "Long Live the King", it is revealed that his people have been enemies of humans for centuries.

- Dagger

Voiced by: Danny Mann

Initially, Baron Dark's dwarfish, slavish aide, later his dwarfish, slavish, skeletal aide, but is mainly the baron's loyal servant. Even when he was briefly restored to the flesh, he continued to work for the baron's interests and longed to be restored to the skeletal state his master had imparted upon him.

- Claw

A werewolf-like creature hired by Baron Dark to patrol Luminicity for anyone who tried to cheat him out of tribute money. After skeletonizing himself, Claw joined the rest of Dark's lieutenants.

== Episodes ==
No.	Title	Written by	Original release date
1	"Flesh and Bone"	Steve Cuden, Eric Lewald, Julia Jane Lewald, and Len Uhley	September 17, 1994
Frustrated by his brother King Justin, Prince Joshua Steele undertakes Baron Dark's task to steal the Lightstar crystal. Justin arrives at the last minute, and both he and Baron Dark seize the crystal, breaking it into two and transforming the Steeles and Baron Dark- the former into super powered beings, the latter into an indestructible skeleton. Joshua, who was caught in the middle, is disfigured. Baron Dark turns his supporters into skeleton warriors, and then sends the skeletons to attack Luminicity castle and capture the other half of the Lightstar crystal, but the Steeles counterattack. The Baron fails to corrupt Joshua and the Steeles escape. The Baron tracks Joshua to his uncle, Ursak's, cottage and poisons his mind. The Steeles and Ursak battle the skeleton warriors and escape the fray just before Ursak self-destructs his house. Justin is renamed Prince Lightstar, Joshua is called Grimskull, Jennifer is Talyn and Ursak is named Guardian.
2	"Trust and Betrayal"	Len Uhley	September 24, 1994
Lightstar rallies Luminicity's remaining population to fight against Baron Dark. Talyn tries to get into a storehouse only to attract a skeleton's attention. After retreating, the people accuse Grimskull of collaboration with Baron Dark. In Grimskull's absence, Talyn and Lightstar carry out a successful raid. While attempting to recruit allies, Talyn and Lightstar are captured by the skeletons. Baron Dark fails to turn Lightstar into a skeleton, but before he can eliminate his prisoners, Guardian and Grimskull storm the skeleton stronghold and beat back Baron Dark.
3	"Heart and Soul"	Steve Cuden	October 1, 1994
The Steeles fight off skeletons that raided a settlement and Talyn rescues the only survivor, Ferris. As Baron Dark plots to kill the Steeles, Ferris tells Talyn his dishonor made him survive, and is transformed into a skeleton warrior by Baron Dark. Talyn goes after Ferris hoping to help him. As she gets captured, Grimskull arrives. In a fight, Talyn restores Ferris' humanity by prying the crystal from his heart. Ferris drives away the skeletons raiding Lightstar's base but doesn't feel ready to join forces.
4	"Bones of Contention"	Jan Strnad	October 8, 1994
Grimskull goes on a mission to recover Baron Dark's half of the Lightstar crystal. Grimskull returns with nothing but a data crystal while his companions are captured. Back at base, the data crystal reveals flashbacks of how the current war began, centered on Grimskull's past betrayal. The people begin to turn against him, but Lightstar takes his brother's sentence in his place while Grimskull goes to rescue the hostages to redeem himself. The hostages are to be fed to a giant worm. Grimskull rescues the hostages and kills the creature. Grimskull is forgiven and accepted by the Legion of Light.
5	"Zara"	Stephanie Mathison	October 15, 1994
After Baron Dark plunders the town of Romney, a lady called Zara drops by her old friends, the Steeles. Lightstar launches an attack on Romney only to be pinned down by Baron Dark. After preventing the skeletons from entering, Lightstar finds Zara sold them out to Baron Dark in exchange for plundered food and medicine. In the quarry, Lightstar's group recover the supplies while Baron Dark kidnaps Zara. Lightstar confronts Baron Dark as Grimskull saves Zara. Lightstar makes it out of the collapsing quarry.
6	"Mindgames"	Sandy Scesny	October 22, 1994
Grimskull suffers frequent torments in his mind from Baron Dark's mind link. While Baron Dark continues to work on a dream infiltration device, the Steeles and Guardian destroy a construction site. Grimskull is plagued in the depths of his mind by Baron Dark but Cyborn faces technical problems in the device from its inventor Dr. Genov. Guardian finds a link with the scientist. Before Baron Dark can destroy Grimskull's mind, Guardian and Lightstar manage to motivate Grimskull to retaliate. Guardian self-destructs the lab before departing.
7	"Harmonic Divergence"	Doug Booth	October 29, 1994
As Baron Dark's forces bomb the North City, Lightstar and his companions come to the city's aid, narrowly escaping. The skeletons are enslaving humans too pure-hearted to be turned into skeleton warriors to build bombs in a factory. After some reconnaissance, Guardian goes undercover in the factory, but his cover is blown by Shriek. After rescuing Guardian, the Legion of Light penetrate and demolish the factory.
8	"Past, Perfect, Future Tense"	Steve Cuden	November 5, 1994
Lightstar and his companions attempt to get ore from a mine, but Baron Dark detonates a bomb to flood the tunnels. The Steeles and Guardian narrowly make it to safety, climbing up onto the mountains. Guardian explains Dr. Jenna's invention; a device which lets people to see visions of possible future. The skeletons, Talyn and Lightstar get in a tangle with a beast. Grimskull has befriended a wolf. Guardian senses a terrible future for Lightstar and barely prevents him meeting his death. Having proved a useful companion, the wolf is named Stalker.
9	"Brawl and Chain"	Len Uhley	November 12, 1994
Baron Dark's new juggernaut, the Gorgon battleship, has finished construction. Lightstar and Talyn go to Semigon kingdom to warn them of the threat, but King Dorigon is hosting Dagger and Shriek as diplomats, forcing both sides to be civil. The two skeletons and Steeles are sentenced to the dungeon after a disruption in the dining room. Lightstar turns Shriek and Dagger back into humans and Dagger divulges the Baron's sinister plot. Together the Steeles and Guardian destroy the Gorgon along with the kingdom's refinery, but Dorigon congratulates them.
10	"Overload"	Susan Talkington	November 19, 1994
The Legion of Light begin a siege against Baron Dark's forces in the middle of their preparations until Shriek shoots Talyn out of the sky. Talyn loses her power, and goes on the run with Shriek, Aracula, and Dagger hunting her. She falls into a cave inhabited by a beast which the skeletons are chased by. Baron Dark is attempting to supercharge his half of the Lightstar crystal, which causes massive overload problems. The search for Talyn becomes desperate as the crystal powers high until Grimskull finds her. The Legion of Light evacuates moments before the crystal overloads.
11	"...Long Live the King"	Brooks Wachtel	November 26, 1994
Baron Dark attempts to stabilize his half of the Lightstar crystal, but fails. Desperate to eliminate the Legion of Light, Baron Dark concocts a plan to impersonate the Steeles' father and lure them away from the castle while his half of the crystal is overloading. The Steeles leave to investigate whether their father is still alive, but are attacked. Baron Dark finds a way to convert huge groups of people into skeleton warriors all at once. The Steeles find only one survivor, Duke Edens, who gives them a recording of their father. Prince Lightstar swears to avenge his father.
12	"Conflict and Consequences – Part 1"	Steve Cuden	December 3, 1994
The skeletons attack the Legion of Light's camp, looking for the crystal's other half. Grimskull is sent to take their crystal half to a secure place, while the others launch a retaliatory attack on Baron Dark's Colosseum. Baron Dark cuts Grimskull off at the bridge, tosses him off, and takes the crystal half.
13	"Conflict and Consequences – Part 2"	Len Uhley	December 10, 1994
Knowing that Baron Dark has both halves of the crystal, Lightstar heads off to confront him but fails, and Baron Dark unites both halves. The Legion of Light are pinned down, but Grimskull (who survived his ordeal) rescues them. While others keep the skeletons occupied, Lightstar battles Baron Dark until he destroys both him and the crystal in a crater of lava.

== Production ==
Gary Goddard came up with the concept for Skeleton Warriors after remembering the scene from Jason and the Argonauts animated by Ray Harryhausen in which Jason and his companions fend off a horde of living skeletons. This inspired Goddard to come up with characters who were nothing but bones and collaborated with Neal Adams on sketches and hired sculptors to produce 3-D models and pitched the concept to Playmates Toys who loved the concept and made a toy deal within 20 minutes of hearing the pitch. In order to flesh out the concept, Goddard decided to theme the heroes around "family" as he felt that was the closest opposite of absolute evil after reading an article discussing family values in the industry trades.

== Broadcast ==
The series was broadcast in the United States on CBS beginning September 17, 1994 until September 2, 1995. The series was paired with other CBS action-oriented cartoons Teenage Mutant Ninja Turtles and Wild C.A.T.s.

== Home media ==
Skeleton Warriors was released in a 2-disc set on December 6, 2011, in North America, featuring all 13 episodes.

== Voice cast ==
- Jeff Bennett as Prince Justin Lightstar
- Nathan Carlson as Dr. Cyborn
- Philip Lewis Clarke as Baron Dark
- Michael Corbett as Grimskull
- Jennifer Hale as Talyn
- Danny Mann as Dagger
- Valery Pappas as Shriek
- Kevin Schon as Ursak/Guardian

=== Additional voices ===
- Earl Boen
- Jim Cummings: Duke Innes (S1 E11)
- Paul Eiding
- Jeannie Elias
- Linda Gary
- Michael Gough
- Tony Jay: Narrator
- Richard Molinare
- Jan Rabson: Chief Guard (S1 E7), King Donogard (S1 E9)
- Kevin Michael Richardson
- Rodney Saulsberry Slave (S1 E7)

== Crew ==
- Susan Blu - Voice Director

== Merchandise ==
Cover of the 1st Marvel spin-off comic

The cartoon also spawned a toyline created by Playmates Toys, a comic book limited series created by Marvel Comics, 6 episode novelisations, a 1996 annual, a board game, a TCG and the Skeleton Warriors video game for the Sega Saturn and PlayStation consoles developed by Neversoft and published by Playmates Interactive.
