= Michael Corbett (actor) =

American actor

- Born: Michael Cianfrani
- Years active: 1979–present

Michael Corbett is an American actor, author, and television personality. He is perhaps best known for his work starring in three daytime soap operas.

== Career ==
Raised in Collingswood, New Jersey, as Michael Cianfrani, he began acting as a student at Collingswood High School, where he graduated in 1973. He was pressured to change his last name, with his agent telling him that his name was "hard to spell, hard to pronounce, and very ethnic."

Corbett began his career on Broadway. Just two weeks after graduating from the Boston Conservatory, he landed a role in the musical Nefertiti starring Andrea Marcoucci. He later played Kenicki in a production of Grease and appeared the roadway production of Come Back Little Sheba starring Shirley Knight and Philip Bosco. He also starred Off-Broadway with Liz Callaway and Karen Mason in The Matinee Kids. While on Broadway, Corbett was cast as Michael Pavel Jr. on Ryan's Hope, by a casting director who had seen him in a play. He played the role from 1979 to 1981.

Corbett played Warren Carter on Search for Tomorrow from 1982 to 1985, and he later portrayed secretary-turned-murderer David Kimble on The Young and the Restless from 1986 to 1991. Corbett has also guest starred on numerous television series including The King of Queens, Star Trek: The Next Generation as Dr. Rabal, and Zoey 101 as Logan's father, Malcolm Reese, and the web series Venice: The Series.

Since 2000, Corbett has hosted real estate and lifestyle segments for the NBC entertainment news program Extra, and won a 2014 Daytime Emmy Award for Outstanding Entertainment News Program as part of the show's team. He is also the host and senior producer of Extra's Mansions and Millionaires!, and the executive producer of Hollywood Medium with Tyler Henry on E!. Corbett also created and executive produced Mansion Hunters for the Reelz channel.

Corbett has written three best selling real estate books: Before You Buy: The Homebuyer’s Handbook for Today’s Market!, Find It, Fix it, Flip It! Make Millions in Real Estate—One House at a Time, and Ready, Set, Sold!, The Insider Secrets to Sell Your House Fast—for Top Dollar!.

== Personal life ==
Corbett was a resident of Collingswood, New Jersey, and the first house he bought was next door to his grandmother's home there.

== Filmography ==
=== Film ===
Year	Title	Role	Notes
1994	Sioux City	Ray Dawes	
1996	The Whole Wide World	Booth Adams	
1996	Romeo + Juliet	Rich Ranchidis	
1998	Shadow of Doubt	Anchor #3	
2001	To Protect and to Serve	Sheppard	
2012	ParaNorman	Movie Zombie (voice)	
2012	Hotel Transylvania	Additional voices	
2017	A Million Happy Nows	Aden	
2024	The Substance	Additional voices	

=== Television ===
Year	Title	Role	Notes
1979–1981	Ryan's Hope	Michael Pavel, Jr.	Main role
1982–1985	Search for Tomorrow	Warren Carter	Main role
1986–1991	The Young and the Restless	David Kimble / Jim	Main role
1987	MacGyver	Phil	Episode: "Out in the Cold"
1987	Women in Prison	Prince	Episode: "The Hole Story"
1991	$100,000 Pyramid	Himself	Aired Sept. 16, 1991 to Sept. 20, 1991
1992	Renegade	Johnny Rizzo	Episode: "Second Chance"
1993	Star Trek: The Next Generation	Dr. Rabal	Episode: "Force of Nature"
1994–1995	Skeleton Warriors	Grimskull, Joshua Steele (voices)	Main role
1995	The Twisted Tales of Felix the Cat	Additional voices	3 episodes
1996–1998	The Fantastic Voyages of Sinbad the Sailor	Additional voices	26 episodes
1997	Extreme Ghostbusters	Chaim (voice)	2 episodes
1998	Beyond Belief: Fact or Fiction	Edward Decateur	Episode: "They Towed My Car"
2000	Max Steel	Voice	Episode: "Fire and Ice"
2001	The King of Queens	Executive	Episode: "Pregnant Pause: Part 2"
2006, 2007	Zoey 101	Malcolm Reese	2 episodes
2016	Venice: The Series	Jake	3 episodes
2020	The Disappointments	Phillip Parker	5 episodes
2023	The Bold and the Beautiful	Judge Evan Scott	4 episodes (episode numbers 9069, 9079, 9112, and 9113)
