= Skeleton Warriors (video game) =

1996 video game

- Developer: Neversoft Entertainment
- Publishers: NA: Playmates Interactive Entertainment; EU: Virgin Interactive Entertainment
- Producers: Dave Hoffman; David A. Luehmann
- Programmers: Daniel Beenfeldt; Kendall Harrison; Mike West
- Artists: Brian Schmitt; Christopher Ward; Eric Pavey
- Writer: Andrew Brown
- Composers: Eric Swanson; Jean-Christophe Beck; Todd Dennis
- Platforms: Sega Saturn, PlayStation
- Release: Saturn: NA: 16 April 1996; EU: 4 September 1996; PlayStation: NA: 22 May 1996; EU: 1 September 1996
- Genres: Platform, beat 'em up
- Mode: Single-player

Skeleton Warriors is a 1996 beat 'em up platform game developed by Neversoft Entertainment for the PlayStation and Sega Saturn. It is based on the animated television series of the same name.

== Gameplay ==
Skeleton Warriors uses 2-dimensional side-scrolling gameplay that combines both beat 'em up and platforming elements, along with occasional hovering motorcycle driving levels. The game uses a mix of pre-rendered sprites with polygonal backgrounds, and fully 3D rendered graphics.

== Reception ==
Next Generation reviewed the Saturn version of the game, rating it three stars out of five, and stated that "in the end, if you simply can't get enough of side-scrolling action games, then you can count on this being one of the best".

IGN rated the PlayStation version 5/10, saying, "The game looks great... The control is well balanced and executed... Unfortunately, the very nature of the game ensures that it grows tedious real fast."

== Reviews ==
- GameFan #38 (vol. 4, issue 2) - February 1996
- GamePro - April 1996
- Video Games & Computer Entertainment - March 1996
- Game Revolution - June 6, 2004
- NowGamer - September 1, 1996
- IGN - November 25, 1996
- All Game Guide - 1998
