= Apocalypse (1998 video game) =

1998 video game

- European box art
- Developer: Neversoft Entertainment
- Publisher: Activision
- Platform: PlayStation
- Release: NA: November 17, 1998; EU: November 1998
- Genres: Third-person shooter, platform game
- Mode: Single-player

Apocalypse is a third-person shooter platform video game released for the PlayStation, developed by Neversoft Entertainment and published by Activision in 1998. It features actor Bruce Willis, who provides the likeness and voice for the main character, Trey Kincaid.

== Plot ==
A brilliant evil scientist named "The Reverend" creates a powerful theocracy based on the idea of a rapidly approaching apocalypse. He uses his expertise to create four powerful beings modeled after the "Horsemen of Apocalypse" as well as "The Beast of Revelation", War, Plague, Beast and Death, in order to ensure this comes to pass. His former colleague, Trey Kincaid (voiced by Bruce Willis), is the only man with the knowledge to stop the Reverend, but is locked up in Paradise Island Prison Facility. He creates a high-power machine gun and escapes the facility while fending off security. He finds a hoverbike and uses it to flee the facility, but the bike crashes, causing Kincaid to land in the island's sewer system. He fights his way through the sewers, and makes his way up to the city, where he witnesses a news report of his escape. Kincaid fights his way through the city, and reaches a laboratory, where he runs into his old friend, Larry, who is revealed to be the horseman Death in disguise. They fight, and Kincaid is victorious. However, during the fight, the lab's reactor is activated, and Kincaid flees from the exploding laboratory.

Kincaid next heads to a graveyard, fighting zombies and feral wolves, before reaching a concert starring Mary Magdalene (voiced by Poe). After the concert, she talks with Kincaid, before revealing herself as Plague, another one of the Four Horsemen. Trey defeats her, and discovers she has been grafted with synthetic implants manufactured by Warfighters Inc., a military robotics company. Kincaid heads to the Warfighters headquarters, and confronts Rafer, the factory's owner, who escapes. Kincaid fights his way through the factory, destroying robotic sentries along the way. He finds Rafer attempting to escape, but Kincaid stops him by blowing up his hovership.

Rafer survives the explosion, and reveals himself as the horseman War. Kincaid defeats him, and heads to the White House. There, he confronts the President, who reveals himself as the final horseman, The Beast. Following an intense battle that destroys the House, Kincaid kills The Beast, before confronting and killing the Reverend, putting an end to his plan. The game ends with Kincaid being corrupted by the Reverend's power.

== Gameplay ==
The player is fighting a tank. The display in the top-right shows that the player is using the rocket launcher, and the blue bar coming down from it indicates how much ammunition is remaining for that weapon.

Apocalypse features 3D gameplay that combines multidirectional shooting and platforming elements. The main character, Trey Kincaid, is moved using either the directional pad or the DualShock controller's left analog stick, and shooting is handled independently by pressing either one of the face buttons or the right stick in a given direction, which automatically fires the current weapon in said direction. The player can also use a selection of different weapons, such as a flamethrower or a grenade launcher, in addition to the standard issue submachine gun, which never runs out of ammo. The player can also use "Smart bombs", that can quickly kill surrounding enemies and destroy objects in a radius. In terms of mobility, Kincaid can jump, crouch, roll, grab ledges, and hang on wires.

== Development ==
The game engine for Apocalypse was completed in January 1996. Initially, the player character was a mercenary accompanied by an AI-controlled partner, Trey Kincaid, in an effort to create the video game equivalent of a buddy film. Activision later signed a multi-million-dollar deal for Bruce Willis to provide Trey Kincaid's voice and likeness, using "cyber-scanning" and motion capture. Trey Kincaid's role was eventually changed to that of the main playable character, thus reducing the necessity for him to have as much spoken dialogue as was originally intended as the scope of Bruce Willis' involvement decreased as development went on. In the finished game, Willis' vocal contributions are limited mostly to the occasional one-liner and a few brief lines of dialogue in story sequences. Willis' face was photo-mapped onto Trey Kincaid's character model. His motion capture performance was recorded at House of Moves, a film studio in Venice, CA. The sessions were held in mid-January 1997 and took two days. During voice recording, Willis made a number of suggestions of changes to the dialogue, which the developers agreed to.

Poe was cast as the character Plague using the same combination of cyber-scanning, motion capture, and voice recording as done with Willis. Apocalypse features several songs from various artists, including Poe and System of a Down. Technology developed for the game allowed live-action music videos from these artists to be projected on large screens within the game's environments.

A three-level "buddy AI" was developed for Kincaid, enabling Kincaid to take up aggressive or defensive approaches and attempt to get power-ups before the player character.

The game was demonstrated at the June 1997 Electronic Entertainment Expo, with Willis present to help promote it. At this time the AI-controlled partner mechanic was still in place, and the game was set to release in September, but the game had been delayed to a later release date of November 17, 1998. While the game originally started off as an internal project for Activision, the almost-bankrupt Neversoft Entertainment picked up the project in early 1998 and used a retooled version of the game engine for the aborted project Big Guns.

The Apocalypse game engine was reworked for use on Neversoft's next title, the seminal Tony Hawk's Pro Skater. Already having in mind that they were going to begin work on Tony Hawk following completion of Apocalypse, the team said they had developed rough in-house playable demos of Trey Kincaid skateboarding around Apocalypse's game environments in order to experiment with the way they wanted Tony Hawk to feel. Even though Neversoft continued to develop and evolve the engine primarily to suit the needs of the Tony Hawk series, it was also put to use in another action title by the team, the popular Spider-Man game they released in 2000. The aspect of the engine that allowed for the live-action music videos to be displayed within Apocalypse's game world was also utilized in Tony Hawk's Pro Skater as well as other subsequent Neversoft titles.

== Reception ==
Reception

Aggregate score
Aggregator	Score
GameRankings	71%

Review scores
Publication	Score
AllGame	3/5
Electronic Gaming Monthly	6.5/10
Famitsu	22/40
Game Informer	7.5/10
GameFan	91%
GamePro	4.5/5
GameRevolution	B+
GameSpot	7.1/10
IGN	7/10
Next Generation	2/5
Official U.S. PlayStation Magazine	3/5

The game received "average" reviews according to the review aggregation website GameRankings

Jeff Gerstmann of GameSpot praised the game's gameplay as a shooter while criticising the voice acting for lacking any feeling and variety. In contrast, Next Generation called it "average", saying that the title did not bring anything new to its shooter genre. In Japan, where the game was ported and published by Success on September 22, 1999, Famitsu gave it a score of 22 out of 40.
