= Kickturn =

Skateboarding trick

The kickturn is a basic skateboarding trick. It can be done on any ramp or slope. It is the process of riding up on a ramp or slope and then turning to ride back down.
