= Freestyle skateboarding tricks =

A freestyle skateboarding trick is a trick performed with a skateboard while freestyle skateboarding. Some of these tricks are done in a stationary position, unlike many other skateboarding tricks. The keys to a good freestyle contest run are variety, difficulty, fluidity, and creativity. This is an incomplete list, which includes most notable tricks.

== Terminology ==
- nose – the part of the board that is normally leading in the riding direction
- tail – the part of the board that is normally trailing in the riding direction
- truck – the collective name for the front and rear axle assemblies of a skateboard
- fakie – to ride backwards
- pivot – to "kickturn", "spin", or "turn the board horizontally"
- varial – to spin 180 degrees or more, as in a varial kickflip (180 pop shove-it + kickflip), body varial (body spins 180 degrees landing in an opposite stance), or 360 varial (often in vert, a 360 pop shove-it that's caught)
- scoop – to push down on the tail/nose with a foot and move it forward or backward, usually to do a pop shove-it (board rotates 180 degrees or more) or any trick including a rotation
- wrap – moving a leg around the board, as in a saran wrap
- airwalk – in the air, when the board is held (usually by the nose) and the feet are not touching the ground
- tailstop – to come to a stop with the tail of the board in contact with the ground
- nosestop – to come to a stop with the nose of the board in contact with the ground
- frontside – indicates the skater is facing the outside of the turn; in slides, indicates that the rail or ledge is to the front (toe side) of the board.
- backside – indicates the skater is facing the center point of the turn; in slides, indicates that the rail or ledge is to the back (heel side) of the board.

== Standing tricks ==
These tricks involve stationary balancing.

=== 50/50 Truckstand/pogo ===
A 50/50 truckstand is when the board is balanced nearly vertical with the back foot standing on the truck and the front hand holding the nose. The typical way to perform a 50/50 truckstand is to put the board into nosestop, grasp the board with the back hand, jump and toss it to the front hand and land with the back foot on the truck, then execute a half-finger flip to land it.

=== Casper ===
A freestyle stance where the skateboard is upside down and balanced on the point of the tail. The skater's back foot is on the underside of the tail and the front foot is hooked under the deck (touching the front foot to the ground is not a proper Casper). Named for inventor Bobby "Casper" Boyden.

While performing this trick, some skateboarders will drop the front part of the board and repeatedly catch it with the front foot, which grabs the attention of spectators due to the rhythm and noise.

=== Railstand ===
In a Railstand, the skateboard is balanced on one edge with the rider standing on the opposite edge, usually with the feet also on the wheels. This position can be used as a set-up for many other tricks, and was invented in the 1970s by Bobby "Casper" Boyden.

A Heelside Railstand is to stand on the board in railstand, with the griptape facing the rider's back, and a Toeside Railstand is the reverse. A common variation is a Cooperstand, which is a Railstand with one foot on a wheel and the other on the nose.

== Handstand ==
A handstand on a skateboard. Many variations evolved from this, including One-Handed Handstands, Headstands, Frogstands, Handstand Wheelies, Handstand Pivots, Handstand Handflips and Fingerflips, Railstand Handstands, etc. Also TV Stands, which are Handstands done in a 50/50.

== Street Plant ==
A hand-plant trick in which the rider holds the board in one hand, does a one-handed handstand, puts the board under the feet, then comes down on top of the board. It is used as a way to get onto one's board. This is like an Invert on Vert, but done on flatground.

A difficult variation is the YoYo Plant, done without the feet touching the ground. It is usually done by rolling fakie with one hand planted on the ground as the other grabs the board. This is one of numerous variations developed by Joachim "YoYo" Schulz.

The HoHo Plant involves a handstand with both hands on the ground and the board resting on the feet. The YoHo Plant begins with a YoYo Plant then places the free hand on the ground to take the HoHo stance. The trick is often seen performed by Terry Synnott.

== Spins ==
=== 360 Spin ===
1970s skate competitions such as the ones shown in Lords of Dogtown would often have an event to see who could do the most consecutive 360 spins on a skateboard. Variations include one-foot spins (on the nose or tail, or grabbing the foot while spinning), two-foot spins (on the nose or tail), crossfoot spins, two-board spins, etc.

=== Bigspin ===
A trick in which the board rotates 360-degrees while the skateboarder turns 180 degrees in the same direction above it. If the skateboarder rotates in the opposite direction of the skateboard it is called Anti-Bigspin. This can be done in any direction from any position, and in freestyle is often done following a Casper.

Higher rotations are possible, with the rotation of the board noted before the name of the trick; e.g.: a 540 Bigspin combines a 540 Shove-It and a 180 turn of the body.

=== Gazelle ===
A Gazelle is a 540-degree rotation of the board while the rider spins 360 degrees in the same direction above it. It is usually done off the front end of the board and spun backside while travelling forwards, but can be done in any direction and combined with flips. Effectively, this is the next step up from a Bigspin.

=== Shove-it ===
A Shove-it is a 180-degree spin (instead of a flip) of the board. The name may have qualifiers added to describe the direction of spin (frontside or backside) or a higher amount of spin. In freestyle, the trick is usually performed off the front of the board while riding forwards, which helps ensure flat and fast spins. In streetstyle, Shove-Its are often popped (called a Pop Shuvit) from either end of the board. Frontside or backside rotations are possible. A Shove-it should spin totally flat, in contrast to an Impossible which should spin totally vertical.

=== Walk The Dog ===
A footwork trick which spins the board. The front foot is positioned in the middle of the board while the back foot steps to the nose and brings it backwards, spinning the board 180 degrees. With practice, this trick can be done in quick repetition – or backwards – though a slow performance can create an illusion of speed.

== Pivots ==
=== End-Over ===
An End-Over is a series of 180-degree pivots, beginning on the nose (or the tail when rolling fakie). Pressure is placed on the nose to lift the back wheels, then the rider quickly turns 180 degrees (frontside or backside), pivoting on the nose while maintaining speed and direction of travel. One pivot is immediately followed by another in the opposite rotation; when these pivots are done in consecutive lines, they are considered End-Overs (end-over-end). It is not uncommon to mix more difficult pivots in to a sequence of End-Overs, such as a 360 pivot or one-foot pivot.

A Jaywalk is an advanced version of the End-Over, in which the foot not performing the pivot is lifted clear of the board and brought to step down at the location the board will be after completing the pivot. This was invented by Brian Remmer.

In the Monster Walk version, instead of alternating pivots, the rider pivots frontside and frontside or backside and backside (fakie), giving the appearance of taking very large steps forward or backward.

== Flips ==
Flip tricks impart momentum to the unweighted board while the skater jumps, and may be used to reorient the board to a desirable position for landing.

=== Butter Flip ===
The Butter Flip is executed following a Heelside Railstand. Both feet hop to one side of the board, side by side with no more than a 2-inch (5 cm) gap. The rider puts pressure onto the end of the board, using the foot that is not on the wheel. This pops the board up, allowing it to be grasped with the hand opposite the foot which applied pressure. This trick is used to transition from Heelside Railstand to a Pogo or 50/50. The board can also be caught with the foot, making it a Butter Flip to a No Handed 50/50. The trick is named for its inventor, Keith Butterfield.

=== Fingerflip ===
A Fingerflip uses a flick of the fingers to flip the skateboard. Typically, the rider rolls forward, grabs the nose of the board with the front hand, then simultaneously jumps and flips the unweighted board with their hand. The rider will then come down on the board or catch the board in mid-air. There are numerous variations including the Double Fingerflip, Varial Fingerflip, Backhand Fingerflip, and 360 Fingerflip, and Fakie versions of these. Ollie Fingerflip variations are considered to be more difficult because the rider must Ollie before initiating the Fingerflip. Professional freestyler Darryl Grogan is known for his Ollie 360 Fingerflip, and Rodney Mullen is known to use an Ollie Varial Fingerflip in many of his runs and videos.

Note that fingerflips are different from handflips, which involve grabbing the edge of the board and use the full hand to throw the board into a flip.

=== Kickflip ===
This trick begins with the rider positioned with feet side-by-side pointed toward the nose; one foot (typically the back foot) is hooked around the edge of the board. The opposite foot pushes down and the hooked foot kicks sideways as the rider jumps, the rider's body turning to land in a normal riding position. Invented by Curt Lindgren.

The feet should never touch the ground in the trick, and turning the hooked foot so that it points directly at the other foot is technically an underflip and considered bad form. Variations include Doubleflips, Varial Flips, 360 Flips and M-80s.

=== Kickback ===
A trick involving a half flip backwards followed by one half or one-and-a-half flips forwards. From a stance with the front foot on the front bolts and the toes of the back foot along the heelside edge in the middle of the board, it can be accomplished by pushing down on the toes of the back foot, then jumping, kicking the board forwards, and catching it on the grip tape.

== Hops and jumps ==
=== Ollie ===
The Ollie is a trick in which the rider and board leap into the air without use of the rider's hands. The rider stomps on the tail of the board to bring it mostly vertical, jumps, bends the knees as the skateboard springs up, and slides the front foot forward to level the skateboard at the peak of the jump. It was originally developed by Alan "Ollie" Gelfand in a bowl, and brought to flat ground by Rodney Mullen. It is considered a fundamental skill in skateboarding, needed to leap onto, over, or off of obstacles.

A Nollie (short for "nose ollie") is the most common variation of an Ollie, reversing the roles of the two legs so that the front foot pops the nose to the ground and the rear foot guides the board.

=== Pogo ===
A trick in which the skateboard is used like a pogo stick. The board is held vertical against the boarder's legs, with one foot on the bottom truck and one or both hands holding the nose to lift the board up as the rider hops. It can also be done by squeezing the board between both legs in a no-handed variant, or stood with one foot on the truck and the other crossed over behind it with the toes of that foot pushing against the griptape for a cross-footed pogo.

A Switchfoot Pogo is performed by alternating the foot on the truck with each of a series of continuous Pogo hops, so that it looks like the skater is walking on the truck.

== Slides and grinds ==
Slides and grinds involve riding the skateboard as it moves across a ledge or rail on its board (slides) or trucks (grinds).

=== Primo Slide ===
This trick requires balancing like a Railstand but is done while moving, with the side of the board sliding along the ground. Invented by Primo Desiderio, the original version involved sliding backside 180 degrees, but many skaters now hold them in a straight line, flipping into and out of them.

=== Coconut Wheelie, Coco Slide ===
A Coconut Wheelie or Coco Slide is like a Primo Slide but the deck never touches the ground, instead being held in a Wheelie on the side. This trick was invented by coach Vince W. Variations include handstands, grabs, transfer to spacewalk, etc.

== Other transitions ==
=== Calf Wrap (Flamingo/Figure Four) ===
A trick in which the skater uses one foot to wrap the board around the calf of their opposite leg, which is planted on the ground, then unwraps it to land in a riding position. An earlier version of this trick was called "Flamingo" or "Figure Four" for the stance of the legs in mid-trick, with the board touching the inside knee or thigh. This was not often used until the faster calf-wrap version was developed to accommodate a backside 180 re-entry on banks and ramps. The trick was invented by Derek Belen, and developed and popularized by Mike Vallely, Rey Gregorio, Dorian Tucker and Kris Markovich.

=== Manual ===
A Manual is a trick similar to a bicycle wheelie where the skateboarder balances with only the front or the back wheels touching the ground. Manuals can be done with either or both feet or on a single wheel. A Manual in which both feet are straight on the nose is called a Hang Ten; its tail counterpart is called a Heelie. English Manuals place the back foot at the back bolts and the front foot underneath the nose, hooking the board up until balance is achieved. The Swedish Manual (likely named after Stefan "Lillis" Akesson) places the front foot on the nose pointing forward and the back toes are used to hook the tail up in a Nose Manual.

A G-Turn is a Nose Manual, but without facing the riding direction. The rider increases speed, then places the front foot on the nose while keeping the back foot over the back wheels. While riding, the board tends to turn frontside or backside, ending with a spin.

Variations: One-Wheeled, Backward, Hang Ten (two feet on the nose)

Currently, the Guinness World Record for the longest manual on a skateboard is 224.33 m (735.99 ft) and was achieved by Sean Glatts (USA) in Solana Beach, California, USA, on 26 August 2017.

Sean's record-breaking manual lasted 1 minute and 16 seconds.

=== Impossible ===
In an Impossible, the board wraps vertically over the back foot in a 360-degree rotation. An early version of the trick (now called a Nosehook Impossible) involved hooking the front foot under the nose to lift the board before the back foot began its scoop; later, Rodney Mullen developed the technique by popping in an Ollie from a regular riding position. There are many variations of both the Nosehook Impossible and the Ollie Impossible. Darryl Grogan was the first to land Impossibles Crossfooted, Halfcab, and to make a one-foot landing, while Mullen has done many variations off the nose, known as Nollie Impossibles.

== Combination tricks ==
=== Broken Fingers ===
This is a Half Truckhook Impossible caught in a 50/50. The rider stands on the tail, puts the front foot under the board, and jumps backwards while scooping the board in front. This will cause the board to flip upside-down. The rider catches the tail of the board with the front hand and lands with the foot which was under the board on the truck. This trick got the name "Broken Fingers" due to the danger involved: failing to jump high enough or lean back sufficiently on the landing can result in crushed fingers. A no-handed version of this trick is referred to as a crossfooted Half Truckhook Impossible caught into a No-Handed 50/50.

=== Casper Disaster ===
Also invented by Bobby "Casper" Boyden, this trick has no relation to the Casper stance. While rolling fakie or nollie, the skater enters a Heelside Railstand one footed. The foot that is not touching the wheel will point down and nudge the griptape side of the skateboard while the rider spins 180 degrees towards the direction of the trucks. After the board and rider have rotated 180 degrees, the feet work together to nudge the skateboard down into a rolling position.

=== Carousel ===
This is a specific truck-to-truck transfer, which may be considered as a half Impossible from a 50/50 to a switch 50/50 – still standing on the back foot. The rider starts from a 50/50, "throws" the board over the foot that stands on the truck and jumps up. When the board has done the "half wrap", the rider lands on the truck and catches the nose of the board with the same hand used to flip it. In 2014, Marco Sassi became the first person to do a 360 Carousel, completing a full impossible around the foot to land back in the original 50/50 position. (By July 2015 only two other freestylers have accomplished this.)

=== Fan Flip ===
A Fan Flip begins from a Pogo stance. The rider jumps up, fingerflips (typically with the front hand), and kicks to the side, landing on the truck in a Pogo stance (usually on the same side).

A no-handed fan flip begins from a no-handed pogo or no-handed 50/50, uses a fingerflip and ends in a no-handed 50/50.

=== Gingersnap ===
While in a Hang Ten (Manual) position, the skater pops down on the nose, causing the board to do a Nollie Hardflip motion, traveling vertically between the riders legs and landing back in normal position. If the half flip is done with a Nosegrab, the trick is referred to as a Bebop, named for Hazze Lindgren.

=== Godzilla Flip ===
This trick involves standing with one foot on the board in Tailstop and spinning the board in an Impossible around that foot with a hand. Either foot and either hand can be used, but neither foot should touch the ground. Not to be confused with the Godzilla Railflip, which is a Triple Varial Railflip with a Body Varial.

=== Helipop ===
A backside 360 Nollie, performed by beginning a pivot just before initiating a Nollie, with the front foot on the nose of the board and the back foot in Nollie Heelflip position. Invented by Rodney Mullen. If a full 360 cannot be achieved, the rider may recover by landing in a 270 and pivoting the rest of the way on the back wheels. Variations: grabs, frontside, flips out.

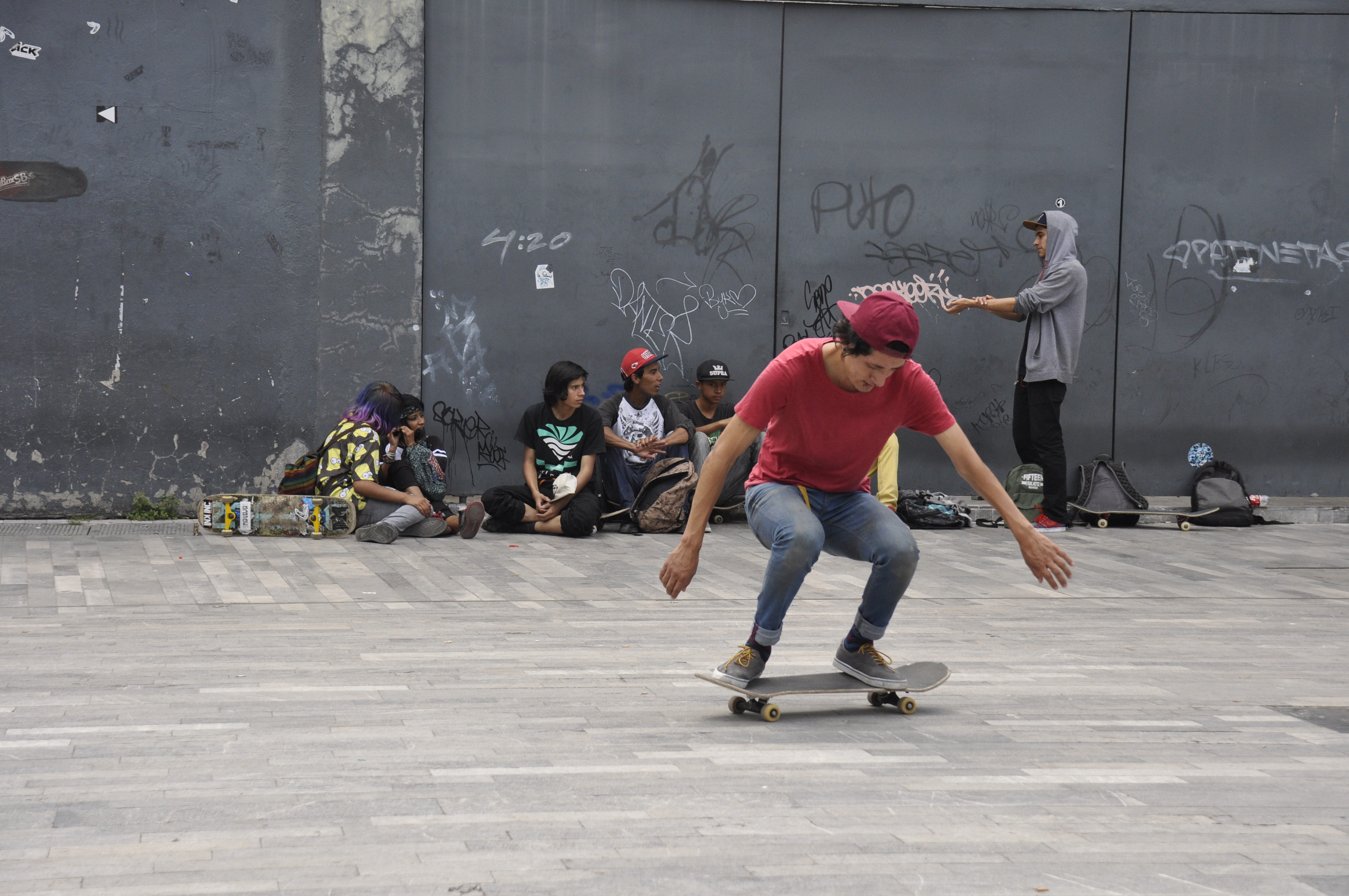
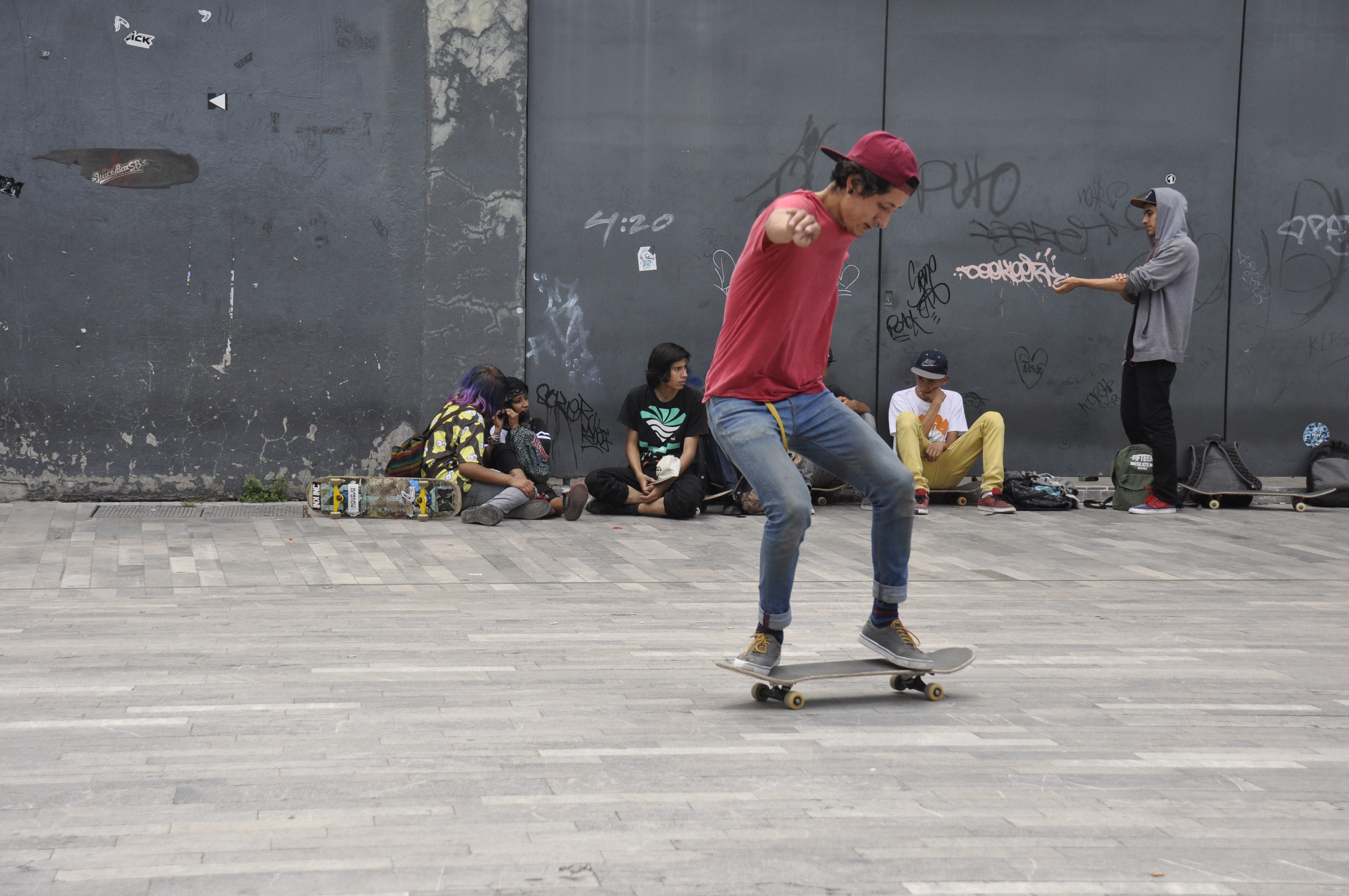
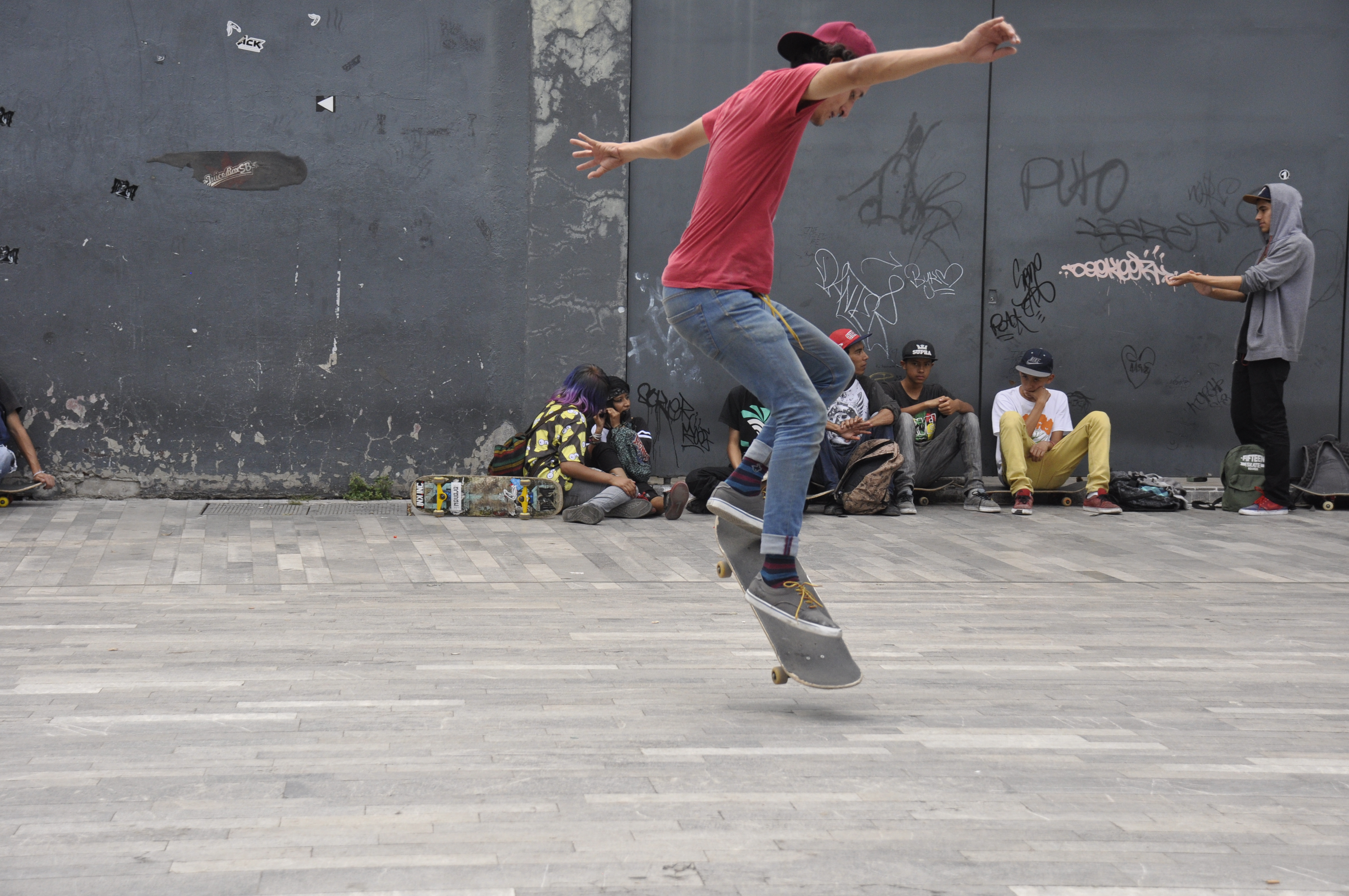
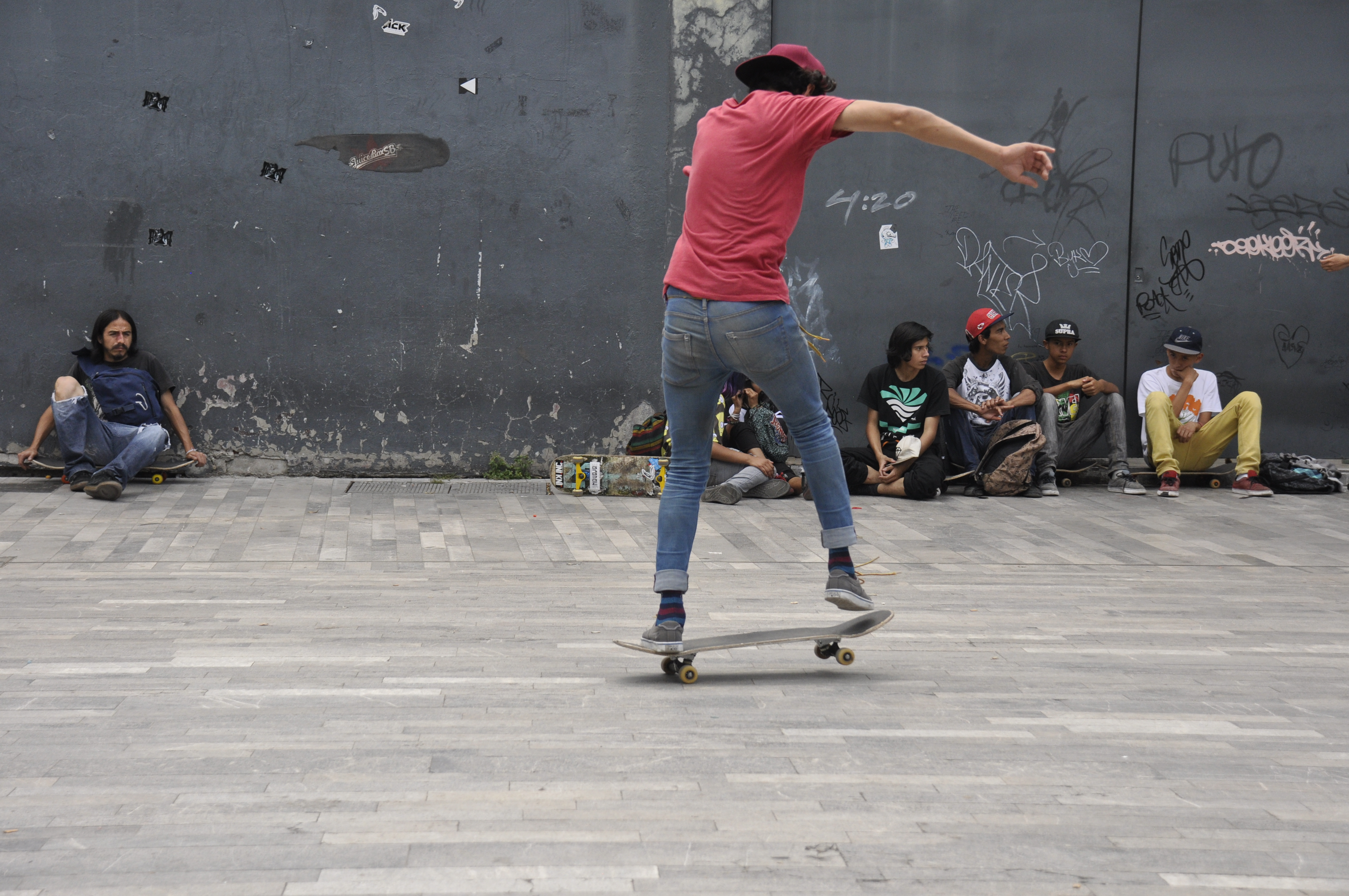
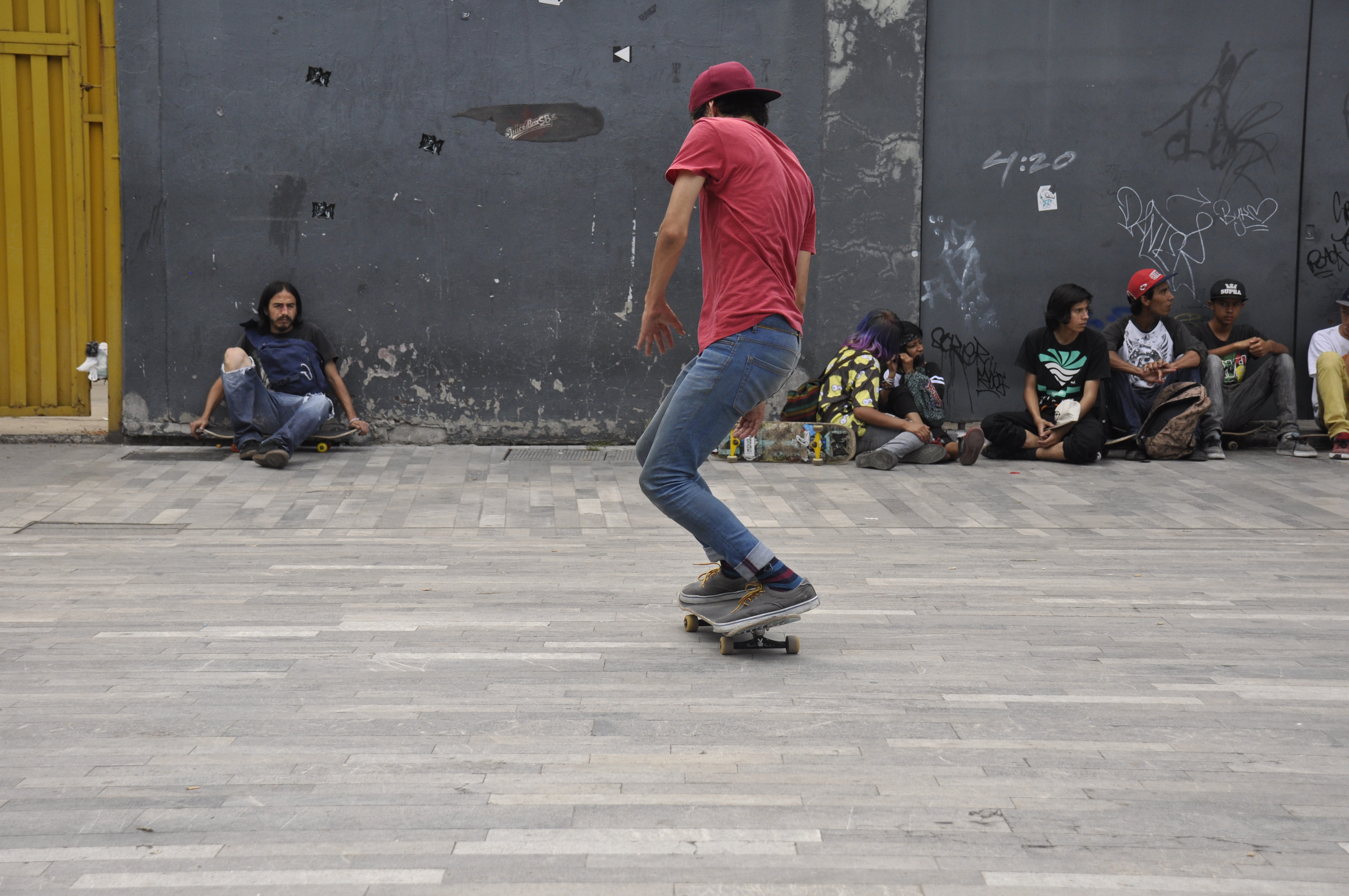
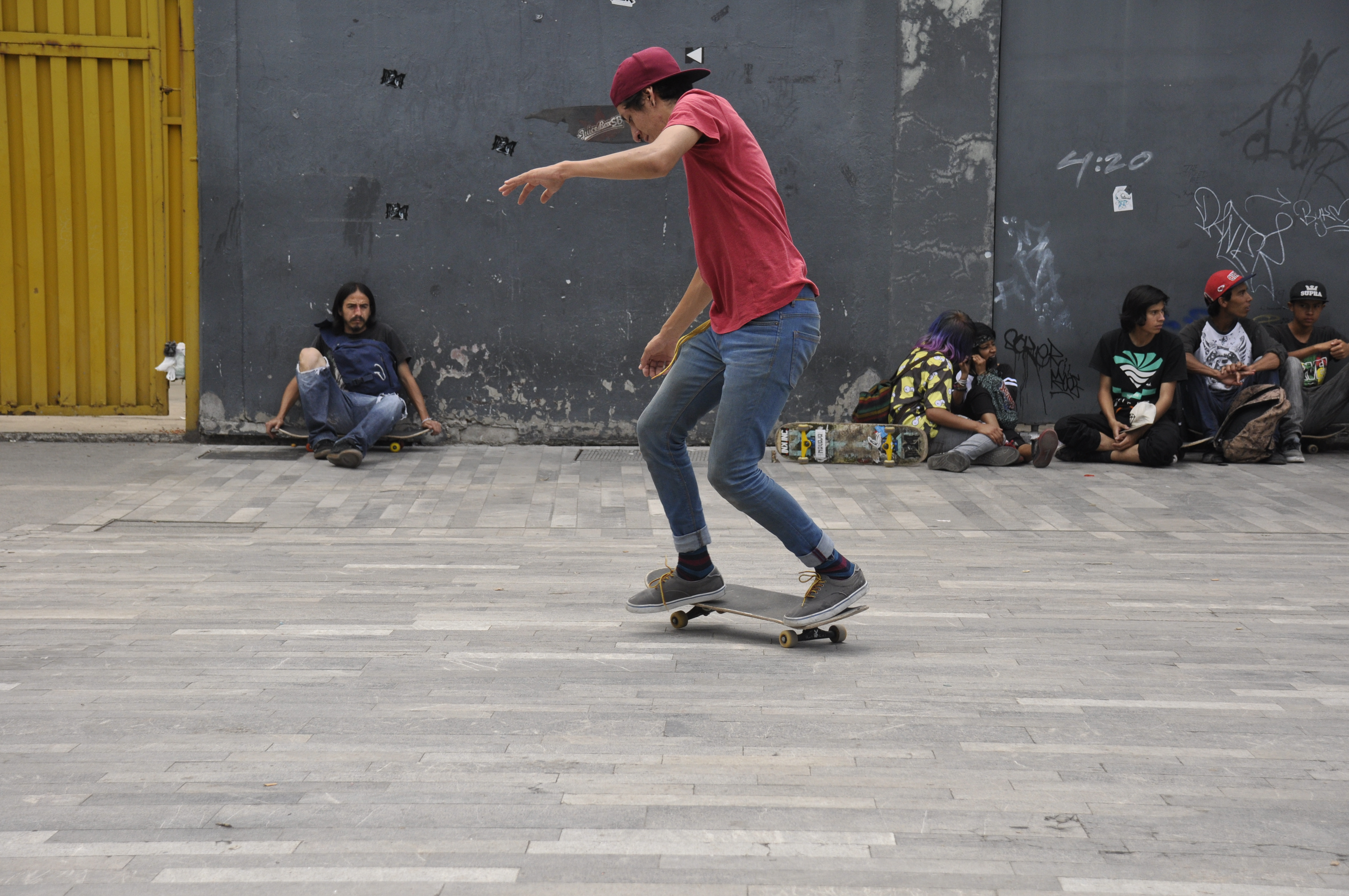
Trying Backside 360 Nollie (or 270 and pivot to 360). Alameda Central, Mexico City, 2015.

=== M-80 ===
This trick begins with a Kickflip, turning the rider's body in the air to catch the board with the back foot on the nose, pivoting 180 degrees on the front wheels before the back wheels hit the ground. It was invented by Matt Barden in 1980. Many variations have been developed, including a Nose M-80 (which omits the body varial and lands the front foot on the nose), fakie and double flip versions.

=== No Comply ===
In this trick the front foot slides off the side of the board, with the body weight on the back foot over the tail; the board then snaps upwards and the rider jumps, guiding the board with the back leg or knee, and returns the front foot into contact with the board. This trick has many variations, including 180, 360, Varials, Flips, Fingerflips, Impossibles, etc. Ray Barbee is noted as a master of No Comply variations to many who have watched the earlier Powell videos.

=== Ollie Airwalk ===
This trick is a combination of an Ollie with an Airwalk. The rider initiates an Ollie and grabs the board with the front hand, while kicking the front foot forward and the back foot backwards (diagonal to the riding direction). This trick was invented by Rodney Mullen, and has many variations, including fingerflips and 180 spins.

=== Pressure Flip ===
This is a flip using only one foot (either), with the board launched into the air and flipped with one motion. Like Ollie Flips, Pressure Flips can be done nollie or fakie in any combination of flipping and rotational directions. The trick most commonly spins backside, flipping in a heelflip direction, resulting in something similar to an Inward Heelflip.

=== San Francisco Flip ===
The San Francisco Flip is a type of a Truck-To-Transfer where the rider enters a No-Handed 50/50 and does a No-Handed Carousel to a Crossfoot No-Handed 50/50. Invented by Guenter Mokulys.

=== Saran Wrap/Wrap Around ===
Invented by Rodney Mullen, and usually done from a Pogo or a 50/50, this trick involves the front leg tracing a circle around the nose of the board without touching the ground. Experienced skaters can do several Saran Wraps continuously.

=== Scarewalk ===
A scarewalk is a back-handed Airwalk, resulting in the board being held in close proximity to the rider's crotch (hence the name). It is sometimes erroneously thought to merely be an Airwalk with the legs kicked in the opposite direction.

=== Sidewinder ===
A truck-to-truck transfer where the rider switches from a pogo on one truck to a pogo on the other truck with the board upside-down throughout. During the trick, the board turns over about 90 degrees. Variations: switch foot, same foot and flips.

=== Spacewalk ===
Another kind of "Walk" in freestyle skateboarding. The rider enters a Manual on two wheels and swings the other end of the board from side-to-side; the other set of wheels should not touch the ground during the trick. The wider the swing, the better the Spacewalk looks. The Many variations exist including Nose Spacewalks, Hang Ten Spacewalks, Backward Spacewalks, One-Knee-Kneeled Spacewalks (invented by Günter Mokulys) and many more.

=== TV Stand ===
A TV Stand is a handstand done in a 50/50. While in a 50/50 or Pogo, the rider grabs the bottom truck (the one with the back foot on) and performs a handstand with the other hand holding the nose of the board. The trick is landed by doing a half flip. A variation when grabbing the top truck is called a "Jawbreaker", invented by Primo Desiderio.

=== Varial kickflip/heelflip ===
A kickflip or heelflip with a twist; the kickflip is combined with a backside shove-it, and a heelflip is combined with a frontside one.

== Multiple-board tricks ==
Placing two, three, or more boards on top of each other can increase the rebound forces and expand the achievable jump height for novice skaters. It is also possible to increase the difficulty by making real tricks out of stacked boards: multiple-board handstands, multiple-board flipouts, ollie to multiple boards, rock'n'roll to multiple-board slide, multiple-board wheelie, etc.

Specific multiple-board tricks include:

=== Daffy ===
This trick is done with two boards, one foot in a tailwheelie on one board and the other foot on the second board in a nosewheelie. It is one of the oldest freestyle tricks and has been featured in the Girl Skateboards video Yeah Right!, Gus Van Sant's film Paranoid Park, and the Lords of Dogtown movie. The Tony Hawk's Underground game calls this a Yeah Right Manual.

Variations include rollerskate-like double-board tailwheelies and double-board nosewheelies, crossfoot wheelies and spins, and a one-foot double-board daffy. It's also possible to "lose" one of the boards and continue with a one-foot wheelie.

== See also ==
- Category:Freestyle skateboarders
