= Mick West =

Science writer and retired programmer

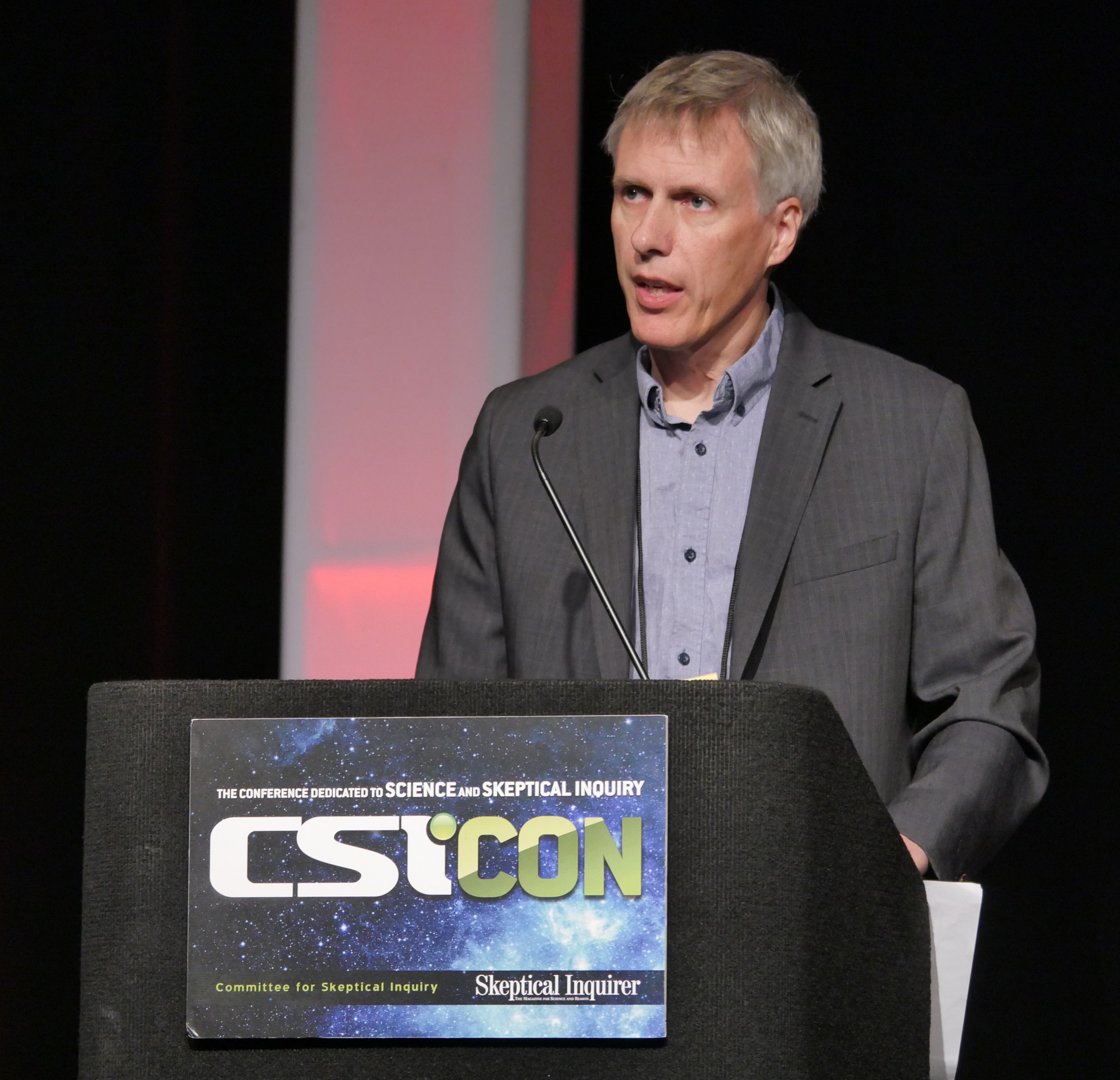
- West speaking at CSICon in 2018
- Born: 1967 (age 58–59)
- Citizenship: United Kingdom; United States
- Education: University of Manchester
- Known for: Debunking chemtrails and other conspiracy theories
- Awards: Committee for Skeptical Inquiry fellow
- Website: www.mickwest.com

Notes
- Voice of Mick West

Mick West (born 1967) is an American science writer, skeptical investigator, and retired video game programmer. He is the creator of the websites Contrail Science and Metabunk, and he investigates and debunks pseudoscientific claims and conspiracy theories such as chemtrails and UFOs. His first book is Escaping the Rabbit Hole: How to Debunk Conspiracy Theories Using Facts, Logic, and Respect (2018).

West has appeared in various media including The New York Times, CBS, the BBC, CNN, NewsNation, New York Magazine, Radio New Zealand, Popular Mechanics and Scientific American as an expert conspiracy analyst and science communicator. He has twice been a speaker at the conference of the Committee for Skeptical Inquiry, and in 2020 was elected a fellow of the organization.

== Early life ==
West grew up in the small town of Bingley, West Yorkshire, on the outskirts of Bradford, England. As a child he was fascinated by the paranormal, UFOs and stories of alien abductions, also believing he had psychic abilities. As he grew older, he came to believe that these phenomena were not real, and instead, that there were rational explanations for them. "I used to believe in all this stuff and then I stopped believing in all this stuff, and I guess just figuring out why this stuff was wrong became interesting to me." In early adulthood, West found himself using a pre-internet, modem-based bulletin board called FidoNet to argue with people who were using it to spread conspiracy theories.

== Video game programming career ==
West co-founded the video game development company Neversoft Entertainment in July 1994 with Joel Jewett and Chris Ward. Neversoft is known for Spider-Man (2000), as well as the Tony Hawk's and Guitar Hero video game franchises, and West was heavily involved in programming the first five games of the Tony Hawk's series. The company was acquired by Activision in October 1999.

== Skepticism career ==
In 2003, after resigning from Neversoft, West's interest in debunking took hold. "I retired, I had lots of spare time, I didn't have vast other interests that I was pursuing, and so I was able to focus on these things. I could focus on Morgellons, and I wrote like a hundred little articles on Morgellons. Because I have this background in video game programming and debugging and investigating things, I was able to do fairly deep technical investigations of things."

West now attempts to interact with his interviewees and his audience on his various media with empathy to help them see reality. These people, he says, see a different version of reality: "They prefer the one where the government is evil. Now, it doesn't mean the government isn't evil, it doesn't mean that people in power aren't corrupt, it doesn't mean politicians aren't corrupt, but it also doesn't mean that they planted bombs in the World Trade Center. Just because politicians are corrupt, it doesn't necessarily follow the World Trade Center was a controlled demolition."

=== Websites ===
West became interested in the chemtrail conspiracy theory while studying aviation weather for his pilot's license. He created the website "Contrail Science" with the aim of explaining contrails and debunking chemtrail theories. He believed initially that he could explain and debunk these theories quite quickly, but they were more resilient than he'd anticipated: he has now spent more than 10 years covering the topic.

The discussion on the "Contrail Science" website eventually expanded to include other conspiracy theories, including that of 9/11. So West decided to create another website, "Metabunk", to expand the discussion to other alternative beliefs. Metabunk covers such topics as pseudoscience, UFOs and the paranormal. The website also includes a forum, "Skydentify", where West invites people to send photos and videos of UFOs and supposed ghosts. He analyzes these using his background in video game programming and Photoshop, and then he and other forum members attempt to explain what the photos and videos are actually depicting. They also discuss the best way to communicate the results of their debunking investigations. Analysis from West and other experts on Metabunk has been cited in generalist publications.

West describes the objective of his work as attempting to get people out of the "rabbit hole" of conspiratorial thinking. "Chemtrails is a surprisingly popular theory; it's right up there with things like the 9/11 conspiracy theories," he says. "It all stems from a fundamental distrust of science and authority. You are always going to get a percentage of people who are true believers. My goal is to minimize that as much as possible, stop people falling for it, and help them get out as easily as possible."

He also created the online forum morgellonswatch.com to dispel the myths and misinformation surrounding the unconfirmed skin condition Morgellons.

=== Academic work ===
In August 2016, West co-authored a paper with climate scientists Ken Caldeira, Christine Shearer, and Steven J. Davis published in the journal Environmental Research Letters titled Quantifying expert consensus against the existence of a secret, large-scale atmospheric spraying program (SLAP). The objective of the paper was to produce a peer-reviewed expert response to the chemtrail theory. The authors surveyed experts on atmospheric chemistry and deposition to scientifically evaluate the claims of chemtrail conspiracy theorists. Upon publication, it was recognized as the first study by a major science organization on the topic. Its conclusion reported that "76 out of 77 (98.7%) scientists that took part in this study said there was no evidence of a SLAP, and that the data cited as evidence could be explained through other factors, such as typical contrail formation and poor data sampling instructions presented on SLAP websites" Data science company Altmetric rated the paper in the top 5% of all research in terms of interest generated and it has been cited many times by scientific publications and news outlets. This included the New York Times, where West said the new study should help sway people who might otherwise be convinced by a chemtrails website. "You're trying to hold back the tide to a certain degree, and hopefully have less people fall into that way of thinking."

=== Committee for Skeptical Inquiry ===
West has written several articles for the Skeptical Inquirer, the journal of the Committee for Skeptical Inquiry (CSI), including "Curated Crowdsourcing in UFO Investigations", "In Defense of Debunkers", and "UFOs Come Out of the Shadows. Again. Perhaps."

In 2016, West delivered a Sunday Papers presentation at the annual conference of CSI, CSICon, titled "Expert Elicitation vs. Chemtrails" in which he discussed his 2016 scientific paper on climate engineering. In 2018, West again spoke at CSICon, this time as a featured speaker on the subject of debunking a 9/11 conspiracy theory involving microspheres.

In 2020, West became a fellow of CSI.

=== Escaping the Rabbit Hole ===
In 2018, West authored Escaping the Rabbit Hole. How to Debunk Conspiracy Theories Using Facts, Logic, and Respect with the goal of helping people understand and explain conspiracy theories, and then pass those explanations onto others. In a review of the book, British actor Stephen Fry wrote "Mick West demonstrates with exquisite style, wit, and insight how those three rare and valuable species, Fact, Logic and Respect (each now on the very brink of extinction) have in harness the power to shine light into darkness and dispel the miasma of bias, superstition and balefully proud ignorance that is threatening to poison our age." The book was featured in an analysis released by the University of McGill Office for Science and Society in 2018. Celestia Ward points out that "Debunking conspiracy theories is a lot of work. But it's worthwhile if you are helping a loved one out of a mindset that can cause them harm. Mick West has shouldered a tremendous amount of the work himself, summarizing some conspiracy beliefs and demonstrable facts to refute those beliefs..."

=== Tales from the Rabbit Hole ===
West started a podcast in April 2019, Tales from the Rabbit Hole, in which he interviews "conspiracy culture" guests.

=== Media coverage ===
West has been cited by a variety of media as an expert analyst on chemtrails, UFOs, and other conspiracy theories.

In 2010, West appeared on the CBS evening news and KPCC radio news to comment on a viral video of what appeared to be a "mystery" missile launch.

In 2013, West appeared in the documentary film "Overcast" as a rebuttal to promoters of chemtrail conspiracy theories.

In September 2016, Radio New Zealand profiled West as a science writer and someone who "is dedicated to the art of debunking wild theories that circulate online and helping other people do the same, with his website, Metabunk." In the interview he described how his passion for debunking comes from a concern that real problems are being ignored because science is ignored. In particular he talked about the harm conspiracy theorists can cause when they accuse the families of victims of gun massacres as being crisis actors. He also explained that when "dealing with conspiracy theorists the best thing is to be polite. You've got to be a kind of gentleman scientist. If people are polite then you will get listened to. Never misrepresent yourself, never lie, never fake evidence, never indulge in hoaxes. You've got to be 100% beyond reproach at all times."

In May 2020, Susan Gerbic of the About Time Project interviewed West regarding how people fall into the "rabbit hole" of conspiracy theories, and discussed ideas for helping friends and family come to reality.

In late December 2020, West was one of the experts quoted in a BBC article regarding suggestions for talking to friends and relatives who believe in conspiracy theories. West said "My number one rule would be to not spoil Christmas...An angry, heated conversation will leave everyone feeling rubbish and further cement conspiracy beliefs."

In May 2021, West was a guest on the CNN show Cuomo Prime Time where he provided his explanations for three recent high-profile UAP videos made by US Navy personnel. In each case West demonstrated that simple misinterpretations and video artifacts were likely explanations of the peculiar attributes of the recorded objects.

West has made a number of appearances on podcasts discussing his life and debunking career. These include being interviewed by Richard Saunders on the Skeptic Zone, Benjamin Radford on Squaring the Strange, and on Something You Should Know. He has also made several appearances on the Joe Rogan Experience to discuss various conspiracy theories.

In June 2021, in advance of the release of the Pentagon UAP Task Force's report on Unidentified Aerial Phenomena, West was interviewed in Scientific American as an expert analyst of the video evidence. Regarding the report, West said, "I expect much discussion and information about the real issues of unidentified flying objects. But I do not anticipate it will have much that will please the UFO enthusiasts."

On August 2, 2022, an article by West was published that provides his detailed analysis of the optical effects he has suggested as the source of the images in the Gimbal Video.

== Citizenship ==
West was raised in England, attending the University of Manchester, but in 2009 he became a citizen of the United States. As of 2020, West was a resident of Sacramento, California.

== Bibliography ==
- Escaping the Rabbit Hole. How to Debunk Conspiracy Theories Using Facts, Logic, and Respect (2018)

== Podcast ==
- Tales from the Rabbit Hole
