= Skateboarding at the 2020 Summer Olympics – Qualification =

There were 80 quota spots available for skateboarding at the 2020 Summer Olympics. Each NOC could obtain a maximum of 3 spots in each event (total 12 maximum across the 4 events). Each event had 20 athletes competing: 3 from the World Championships, 16 from world rankings, and 1 from the host, Japan. The full list of skaters qualified was announced on 9 June 2021.

== Timeline ==
Event	Date	Venue
2021 Street Skateboarding World Championships	30 May – 6 June 2021	(Italy) Rome
2021 World Skateboarding Championships Park	14–20 June 2021	Canceled
Olympic World Skateboarding Rankings	30 June 2021	—

== Qualification summary ==
NOC	Men		Women		Total
NOC	Park	Street	Park	Street	Athletes
Australia	2	1	1	1	5
Austria				1	1
Belgium		1		1	2
Brazil	3	3	3	3	12
Canada	1	2		1	4
Chile			1		1
China			1	1	2
Colombia		1			1
Denmark	1				1
Finland			1		1
France	1	2	1	1	5
Germany	1		1		2
Great Britain			2		2
Italy	2			1	3
Japan	1	3	3	3	10
Netherlands				3	3
Peru		1			1
Philippines				1	1
Poland			1		1
Portugal		1			1
Puerto Rico	1	1			2
South Africa	1	1	1	1	4
Spain	2		1		3
Sweden	1				1
United States	3	3	3	3	12
Total: 25 NOCs	20	20	20	20	80

== Men's park ==
Event	Places	Qualified athlete
Host nation	1	Ayumu Hirano (JPN)
World Olympic Rankings	16	Heimana Reynolds (USA); Cory Juneau (USA); Luiz Francisco (BRA); Pedro Barros (BRA); Zion Wright (USA); Keegan Palmer (AUS); Oskar Rozenberg (SWE); Pedro Quintas (BRA); Ivan Federico (ITA); Steven Pineiro (PUR); Alessandro Mazzara (ITA); Vincent Matheron (FRA); Jaime Mateu (ESP); Kieran Woolley (AUS); Tyler Edtmayer (GER); Danny Leon (ESP)
World Championships (Re-Allocation)	3	Andy Anderson (CAN); Rune Glifberg (DEN); Dallas Oberholtzer (RSA)**
Total	20	

**Continental representation

== Women's park ==
Event	Places	Qualified athlete
Host nation	0	–
World Olympic Rankings	16	Misugu Okamoto (JPN); Sakura Yosozumi (JPN); Sky Brown (GBR); Poppy Starr Olsen (AUS); Lizzie Armanto (FIN); Kokona Hiraki (JPN); Bryce Wettstein (USA); Dora Varella (BRA); Isadora Pacheco (BRA); Brighton Zeuner (USA); Jordyn Barratt (USA); Yndiara Asp (BRA); Julia Benedetti (ESP); Lilly Stoephasius (GER); Zhang Xin (CHN); Madeleine Larcheron (FRA)
World Championships & Host Nation (Re-Allocation)	4	Amelia Brodka (POL); Josefina Tapia Varas (CHI); Bombette Martin (GBR); Melissa Williams (RSA)**
Total	20	

**Continental representation

== Men's street ==
Event	Places	Qualified athlete
Host nation	0	–
World Championships	3	Nyjah Huston (USA); Yuto Horigome (JPN); Sora Shirai (JPN)
World Olympic Rankings	16	Kelvin Hoefler (BRA); Gustavo Ribeiro (POR); Aurélien Giraud (FRA); Jake Ilardi (USA); Jagger Eaton (USA); Vincent Milou (FRA); Matt Berger (CAN); Manny Santiago (PUR); Shane O'Neill (AUS); Ángelo Caro (PER); Felipe Gustavo (BRA); Yukito Aoki (JPN); Giovanni Vianna (BRA); Micky Papa (CAN); Axel Cruysberghs (BEL); Jhancarlos González (COL)
Host Nation (Re-Allocation)	1	Brandon Valjalo (RSA)**
Total	20	

**Continental representation

== Women's street ==
Event	Places	Qualified athlete
Host nation	0	–
World Championships	3	Pamela Rosa (BRA); Rayssa Leal (BRA); Aori Nishimura (JPN)
World Olympic Rankings	16	Letícia Bufoni (BRA); Momiji Nishiya (JPN); Mariah Duran (USA); Roos Zwetsloot (NED); ~~Candy Jacobs (NED)~~; Hayley Wilson (AUS); Funa Nakayama (JPN); Alexis Sablone (USA); Keet Oldenbeuving (NED); Margielyn Didal (PHI); Alana Smith (USA); Zeng Wenhui (CHN); Lore Bruggeman (BEL); Julia Brueckler (AUT); Charlotte Hym (FRA); Asia Lanzi (ITA)
Host Nation (Re-Allocation)	0	~~Boipel Awuah (RSA)~~**
Re-Allocation	2	Andrea Benítez (ESP); Annie Guglia (CAN)
Total	20	

**Continental representation
