= List of skateboarders at the 2020 Summer Olympics =

This list includes skateboarders who have competed or will compete at the 2020 Summer Olympics in Tokyo, Japan. There are two skateboarding disciplines, park and street, each contested as a men's event and a women's event.

== Men ==
	Name	Country	Date of birth	Event
Youngest competitor	Alessandro Mazzara	Italy	5 May 2004 (aged 17)	Park
Oldest competitor	Rune Glifberg	Denmark	7 October 1974 (aged 46)	Park

NOC	Name	Age	Event	Notes
Australia	Shane O'Neill	3 January 1990 (aged 31)	Street	
Australia	Kieran Woolley	20 November 2003 (aged 17)	Park	
Australia	Keegan Palmer	13 March 2003 (aged 18)	Park	
Belgium	Axel Cruysberghs	12 October 1994 (aged 26)	Street	
Brazil	Pedro Barros	16 March 1995 (aged 26)	Park	
Brazil	Gustavo Felipe	22 February 1991 (aged 30)	Street	
Brazil	Luiz Francisco	24 July 2000 (aged 20)	Park	
Brazil	Kelvin Hoefler	10 February 1993 (aged 28)	Street	
Brazil	Pedro Quintas	13 May 2002 (aged 19)	Park	
Brazil	Giovanni Vianna	26 January 2001 (aged 20)	Street	
Canada	Andy Anderson	13 April 1996 (aged 25)	Park	
Canada	Matt Berger	10 October 1993 (aged 27)	Street	
Canada	Micky Papa	31 August 1990 (aged 30)	Street	
Colombia	Jhancarlos González	14 March 1997 (aged 24)	Street	
Denmark	Rune Glifberg	7 October 1974 (aged 46)	Park	
France	Aurélien Giraud	3 February 1998 (aged 23)	Street	
France	Vincent Matheron	15 May 1998 (aged 23)	Park	
France	Vincent Milou	11 November 1996 (aged 24)	Street	
Germany	Tyler Edtmayer	26 December 2000 (aged 20)	Park	
Italy	Ivan Federico	20 March 1999 (aged 22)	Park	
Italy	Alessandro Mazzara	5 May 2004 (aged 17)	Park	
Japan	Yukito Aoki	4 September 2003 (aged 17)	Street	
Japan	Ayumu Hirano	29 November 1998 (aged 22)	Park	
Japan	Yuto Horigome	7 January 1999 (aged 22)	Street	
Japan	Sora Shirai	3 November 2001 (aged 19)	Street	
Peru	Ángelo Caro	27 August 1999 (aged 21)	Street	
Portugal	Gustavo Ribeiro	27 March 2001 (aged 20)	Street	
Puerto Rico	Steven Pineiro	17 November 1996 (aged 24)	Park	
Puerto Rico	Manny Santiago	10 September 1985 (aged 35)	Street	
South Africa	Dallas Oberholtzer	27 June 1975 (aged 46)	Park	
South Africa	Brandon Valjalo	11 July 1998 (aged 23)	Street	
Spain	Danny Leon	1 December 1994 (aged 26)	Park	
Spain	Jaime Mateu	28 October 1995 (aged 25)	Park	
Sweden	Oskar Rozenberg	11 November 1996 (aged 24)	Park	
United States	Jagger Eaton	21 February 2001 (aged 20)	Street	
United States	Nyjah Huston	30 November 1994 (aged 26)	Street	
United States	Jake Ilardi	11 March 1997 (aged 24)	Street	
United States	Cory Juneau	20 June 1999 (aged 22)	Park	
United States	Heimana Reynolds	1 August 1998 (aged 22)	Park	
United States	Zion Wright	3 February 1999 (aged 22)	Park	

== Women ==
	Name	Country	Date of birth	Event
Youngest competitor	Kokona Hiraki	Japan	26 August 2008 (aged 12)	Park
Oldest competitor	Melissa Williams	South Africa	12 June 1985 (aged 36)	Park

NOC	Name	Age	Event	Notes
Australia	Poppy Starr Olsen	1 June 2000 (aged 21)	Park	
Australia	Hayley Wilson	29 October 2001 (aged 19)	Street	
Austria	Julia Brückler	28 November 1989 (aged 31)	Street	
Belgium	Lore Bruggeman	30 April 2002 (aged 19)	Street	
Brazil	Yndiara Asp	19 October 1997 (aged 23)	Park	
Brazil	Leticia Bufoni	13 April 1993 (aged 28)	Street	
Brazil	Rayssa Leal	4 January 2006 (aged 15)	Street	
Brazil	Isadora Pacheco	29 March 2005 (aged 16)	Park	
Brazil	Pamela Rosa	19 July 1999 (aged 22)	Street	
Brazil	Dora Varella	31 July 2001 (aged 19)	Park	
Canada	Annie Guglia	15 November 1990 (aged 30)	Street	
Chile	Josefina Tapia Varas	25 April 2002 (aged 19)	Park	
China	Wenhui Zeng	8 February 2005 (aged 16)	Street	
China	Xin Zhang	1 December 1998 (aged 22)	Park	
Finland	Lizzie Armanto	26 January 1993 (aged 28)	Park	
France	Charlotte Hym	30 October 1992 (aged 28)	Street	
France	Madeleine Larcheron	24 January 2006 (aged 15)	Park	
Germany	Lilly Stoephasius	5 June 2007 (aged 14)	Park	
Great Britain	Sky Brown	7 July 2008 (aged 13)	Park	
Great Britain	Bombette Martin	1 June 2006 (aged 15)	Park	
Italy	Asia Lanzi	9 January 2002 (aged 19)	Street	
Japan	Kokona Hiraki	26 August 2008 (aged 12)	Park	
Japan	Funa Nakayama	17 June 2005 (aged 16)	Street	
Japan	Aori Nishimura	31 July 2001 (aged 19)	Street	
Japan	Momiji Nishiya	30 August 2007 (aged 13)	Street	
Japan	Misugu Okamoto	22 June 2006 (aged 15)	Park	
Japan	Sakura Yosozumi	15 March 2002 (aged 19)	Park	
Netherlands	Keet Oldenbeuving	1 September 2004 (aged 16)	Street	
Netherlands	Roos Zwetsloot	27 July 2000 (aged 20)	Street	
Philippines	Margielyn Didal	19 April 1999 (aged 22)	Street	
Poland	Amelia Brodka	18 August 1989 (aged 31)	Park	
Spain	Julia Benedetti	25 September 2004 (aged 16)	Park	
Spain	Andrea Benítez	29 September 1994 (aged 26)	Street	
South Africa	Melissa Williams	12 June 1985 (aged 36)	Park	
United States	Jordyn Barratt	28 December 1998 (aged 22)	Park	
United States	Mariah Duran	14 December 1996 (aged 24)	Street	
United States	Alexis Sablone	12 August 1986 (aged 34)	Street	
United States	Alana Smith	20 October 2000 (aged 20)	Street	
United States	Bryce Wettstein	10 January 2004 (aged 17)	Park	
United States	Brighton Zeuner	14 July 2004 (aged 17)	Park	
