= Skateboarding at the 2024 Summer Olympics – Men's park =

Men's park at the Games of the XXXIII Olympiad
- Olympic skateboarding
- Dates: 7 August 2024
- Competitors: 22 from 14 nations

Medalists
1st place, gold medalist(s)		Keegan Palmer	Australia
2nd place, silver medalist(s)		Tom Schaar	United States
3rd place, bronze medalist(s)		Augusto Akio	Brazil

The 2024 Summer Olympics men's park skateboarding competitions took place on August 7, 2024.

== Results ==
=== Semifinals ===
The top eight skateboarders of 22 advanced to the final.

Rank	Heat	Skateboarder	Nation	Run			Notes
Rank	Heat	Skateboarder	Nation	1	2	3	Notes
1	1	Keegan Palmer	Australia	~~77.03~~	~~89.31~~	93.78	Q
2	1	Tom Schaar	United States	~~89.05~~	92.05	~~32.70~~	Q
3	3	Alex Sorgente	Italy	~~89.96~~	91.14	~~12.33~~	Q
4	2	Tate Carew	United States	~~77.18~~	90.42	~~16.83~~	Q
5	4	Keefer Wilson	Australia	~~81.70~~	~~88.60~~	90.10	Q
6	3	Pedro Barros	Brazil	89.24	~~2.83~~	~~81.10~~	Q
7	4	Luigi Cini	Brazil	89.10	~~29.33~~	~~12.006~~	Q
8	3	Augusto Akio	Brazil	~~88.79~~	~~29.33~~	88.98	Q
9	2	Hampus Winberg	Sweden	~~82.58~~	~~74.00~~	88.29	
10	2	Gavin Bottger	United States	~~20.30~~	86.95	~~60.03~~	
11	1	Alessandro Mazzara	Italy	~~56.00~~	83.17	~~2.73~~	
12	2	Vincent Matheron	France	82.02	~~18.74~~	~~8.66~~	
13	3	Thomas Augusto	Portugal	~~3.10~~	81.75	~~2.66~~	
14	4	Steven Piñeiro	Puerto Rico	81.54	~~10.33~~	~~19.33~~	
15	2	Yuro Nagahara	Japan	81.38	~~2.36~~	~~2.38~~	
16	1	Kieran Woolley	Australia	~~20.85~~	~~14.93~~	80.04	
17	2	Tyler Edtmayer	Germany	~~76.49~~	78.20	~~2.43~~	
18	4	Andy Macdonald	Great Britain	~~72.07~~	~~76.61~~	77.66	
19	1	Alain Kortabitarte	Spain	~~29.38~~	~~49.21~~	75.46	
20	4	Danny León	Spain	56.25	~~7.33~~	~~10.00~~	
21	1	Viktor Solmunde	Denmark	42.95	~~42.83~~	~~36.00~~	
22	3	Dallas Oberholzer	South Africa	~~7.00~~	~~19.001~~	33.83	

=== Final ===
The results of the final were:

Rank	Skateboarder	Nation	Run			Notes
Rank	Skateboarder	Nation	1	2	3	Notes
1st place, gold medalist(s)	Keegan Palmer	Australia	93.11	~~63.66~~	~~65.20~~	
2nd place, silver medalist(s)	Tom Schaar	United States	~~90.11~~	92.23	~~83.08~~	
3rd place, bronze medalist(s)	Augusto Akio	Brazil	~~2.66~~	~~81.34~~	91.85	
4	Pedro Barros	Brazil	~~22.10~~	~~86.41~~	91.65	
5	Tate Carew	United States	~~18.06~~	91.17	~~71.46~~	
6	Alex Sorgente	Italy	~~22.80~~	84.26	~~63.76~~	
7	Luigi Cini	Brazil	~~19.70~~	~~2.36~~	76.89	
8	Keefer Wilson	Australia	~~40.03~~	~~32.73~~	58.36	
