= European Skateboarding Championships =

European Skateboarding Championships is a sports championships in Europe.

== Park skateboarding ==
=== Editions ===
Year	Dates	City and host country
2017	25–26 May	Malmö, Sweden
2018	3–6 September	Malmö, Sweden

=== Medalists ===
Men

Year	Gold	Silver	Bronze
2017	Rune Glifberg (DEN)	Sam Beckett (UK)	Vincent Matheron (SWE)
2018			

Women

Year	Gold	Silver	Bronze
2017	Amelia Brodka (POL)	Shani Bru (FRA)	Catherine Marquis (GER)
2018			

== Street skateboarding ==
=== Editions ===
Year	Dates	City and host country
2018	31 August – 2 September	Basel, Switzerland
2019	20–23 June	Duisburg, Germany

=== Medalists ===
Men

Year	Gold	Silver	Bronze
2018	Benjamin Garcia (FRA)	Joseph Garbaccio (FRA)	Douwe Macare (NED)
2019	Alex Mizurov (GER)	Bruno Senra (POR)	Konstantin Kabanov (RUS)

Women

Year	Gold	Silver	Bronze
2018	Julia Brückler (AUT)	Candy Jacobs (NED)	Lore Bruggeman (BEL)
2019	Candy Jacobs (NED)	Roos Zwetsloot (NED)	Tonje Pedersen (NOR)

== See also ==
- World Skateboarding Championship
