= Skateboarding at the Summer Olympics =

- IOC Code: SKB
- Governing body: World Skate
- Events: 4 (men: 2; women: 2)

Summer Olympics
- 1896; 1900; 1904; 1908; 1912; 1920; 1924; 1928; 1932; 1936; 1948; 1952; 1956; 1960; 1964; 1968; 1972; 1976; 1980; 1984; 1988; 1992; 1996; 2000; 2004; 2008; 2012; 2016; 2020; 2024; 2028; 2032
- Medalists

Competitions in the sport of skateboarding, governed by World Skate, have been held at two editions of the Summer Olympic Games. First selected as one of the discretionary sports at the 2020 and 2024 games, skateboarding will be inducted as one of the mandatory sports at the 2028 games. Athletes compete in the disciplines of park and street skateboarding – each their own events. Japan has won both the most gold medals (5) and most medals overall (9).

== Bid for inclusion ==
In September 2015, skateboarding was included in a shortlist along with baseball, softball, karate, surfing, and sport climbing to be considered for inclusion in the 2020 Summer Olympics; and in June 2016, the Executive Board of the International Olympic Committee (IOC) announced that they would support the proposal to include all of the shortlisted sports in the 2020 Games. Finally, on August 3, 2016, all five sports (counting baseball and softball together as one sport) were approved for inclusion in the 2020 Olympic program. One of the biggest obstacles for skateboarding for an inclusion at the Olympics was that huge injuries in skateboarding were so risky (which can include death) and the IOC was less likely to take liabilities. Also the skateboarding sub-culture helped push the idea that the Olympic Games were too "mainstream" for the sport, and as a result skateboarding organizations did not campaign heavily for the sport's inclusion.

== Summary ==
Games	Year	Events	Best Nation
32	2020	4	Japan (1)
33	2024	4	Japan (2)
34	2028	4	

== Events ==
Current program
Event	2020	2024	2028	Total
Men's park	X	X	X	3
Men's street	X	X	X	3
Women's park	X	X	X	3
Women's street	X	X	X	3
Total	4	4	4	12

== Participating nations ==
The following nations have taken part in the Olympic skateboarding competition. The numbers in the table indicate the number of competitors sent to that year's Olympics.

Nation	2020	2024	2028	Years
Australia	5	9		2
Argentina	5	2		2
Austria	1	2		2
Brazil	10	12		1
Canada	4	4		1
China	2	4		2
Colombia	1	1		2
Chile	1	7		2
Czech Republic	1	1		2
Denmark	1	1		2
France	5	7		2
Finland	1	1		2
Germany	2	2		2
Great Britain	2	3		2
Indonesia	–	4		1
Iran	–	1		1
Italy	3	2		2
Japan	10	10		2
Kazakhstan	1	1		2
Morocco	5	1		2
New Zealand	–	2		1
Netherlands	2	2		2
Poland	1	2		2
Portugal	1	2		2
Peru	1	7		2
Philippines	1	–		1
Puerto Rico	2	1		2
ROC	3	–	–	1
Slovenia	2	1		2
South Africa	3	3		2
South Korea	2	3		2
Spain	4	5		2
Sweden	1	1		2
Switzerland	1	1		2
Thailand	5	1		2
Ukraine	–	2		1
United States	10	12		2
Nations	19	22		24
Skateboarders	40	68		
Year	2020	2024	2028	3

== Medal table ==
Rank	Nation	Gold	Silver	Bronze	Total
1	Japan	5	3	1	9
2	Australia	3	0	0	3
3	Brazil	0	3	2	5
4	United States	0	2	3	5
5	Great Britain	0	0	2	2
Totals (5 entries)		8	8	8	24

== Medalists ==
=== Men ===
==== Park ====
Games	Gold	Silver	Bronze
2020 Tokyo	Keegan Palmer; Australia	Pedro Barros; Brazil	Cory Juneau; United States
2024 Paris	Keegan Palmer; Australia	Tom Schaar; United States	Augusto Akio; Brazil
2028 Los Angeles			

==== Street ====
Games	Gold	Silver	Bronze
2020 Tokyo	Yuto Horigome; Japan	Kelvin Hoefler; Brazil	Jagger Eaton; United States
2024 Paris	Yuto Horigome; Japan	Jagger Eaton; United States	Nyjah Huston; United States
2028 Los Angeles			

=== Women ===
==== Park ====
Games	Gold	Silver	Bronze
2020 Tokyo	Sakura Yosozumi; Japan	Kokona Hiraki; Japan	Sky Brown; Great Britain
2024 Paris	Arisa Trew; Australia	Kokona Hiraki; Japan	Sky Brown; Great Britain
2028 Los Angeles			

==== Street ====
Games	Gold	Silver	Bronze
2020 Tokyo	Momiji Nishiya; Japan	Rayssa Leal; Brazil	Funa Nakayama; Japan
2024 Paris	Coco Yoshizawa; Japan	Liz Akama; Japan	Rayssa Leal; Brazil
2028 Los Angeles			
