= 2017 European Skateboarding Championships =

The 2017 European Skateboarding Championships was held in Malmö, Sweden between May 25-26, 2017 for the park event.

== Park skateboarding ==
=== Men's ===
Rank	Athlete	Country
1st place, gold medalist(s)	Rune Glifberg	Denmark
2nd place, silver medalist(s)	Sam Beckett	United Kingdom
3rd place, bronze medalist(s)	Vincent Matheron	France
4	Herman Moller	Sweden
5	Alessandro Mazzara	Italy
6	Alex Hallford	United Kingdom
7	Martino Cattaneo	Switzerland
8	Dannie Carlsen	Denmark

=== Women's ===
Rank	Athlete	Country
1st place, gold medalist(s)	Amelia Brodka	Poland
2nd place, silver medalist(s)	Shani Bru	France
3rd place, bronze medalist(s)	Catherine Marquis	Germany
4	Bettina Pfeifer	Austria
5	Chloé Bernard	France
6	Maite Louisy	Sweden
7	Laurine Lemieux	France
8	Jessica Jansson	Sweden
9	Stefani Nurding	United Kingdom
10	Pauliana Laffabrier	France
11	Emma Fastesson Lindgren	Sweden
12	Emma Bernstrom	Sweden
13	Marie Dabbadie	France
