= Augusto Akio =

Brazilian skateboarder (born 2000)

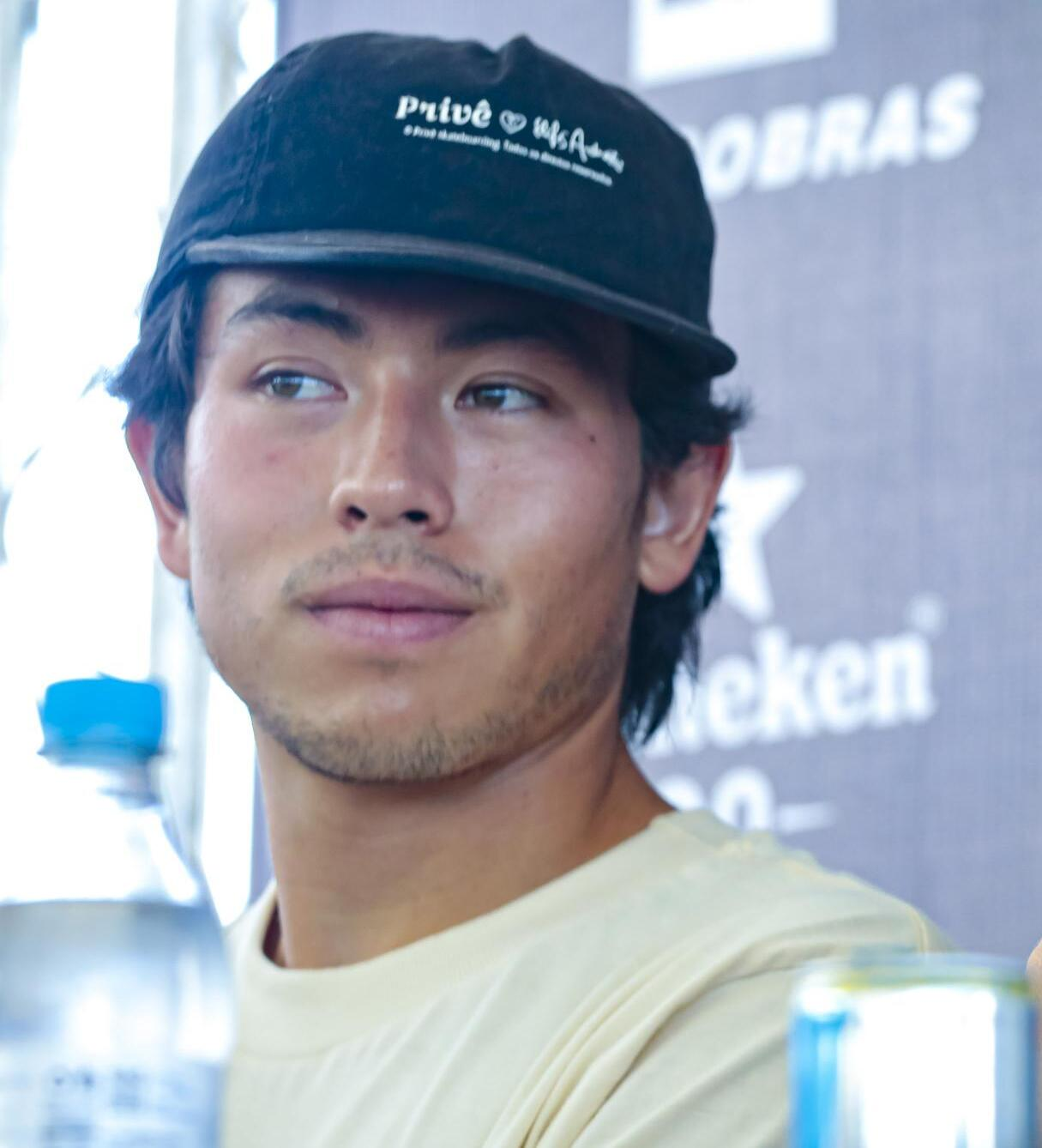
- Akio in 2025

Personal information
- Full name: Augusto Akio Takahashi dos Santos
- Nickname: Japinha
- Born: 12 December 2000 (age 25) Curitiba, Brazil

Sport
- Country: Brazil
- Sport: Skateboarding
Medal record
Men's skateboarding
Olympic Games
Bronze medal – third place	2024 Paris	Park
World Championships
Gold medal – first place	2024 Rome	Park
Silver medal – second place	2022 Sharjah	Park
Silver medal – second place	2022 Buenos Aires	Vert
Silver medal – second place	2024 Rome	Vert
Pan American Games
Silver medal – second place	2023 Santiago	Park

Augusto Akio Takahashi dos Santos (born 12 December 2000) is a Brazilian skateboarder specializing in park skateboarding.

== Career ==
He began to stand out on the national skateboarding scene when he was just 11 years old. In 2019, he won bronze at the Vert World Championship held in Barcelona, but did not make it past the World Park Championship qualifiers, in São Paulo. He placed 6th in the final of the X Games in Minneapolis 2019. He failed to qualify for the Tokyo 2020 Games.

At the 2022 World Skateboarding Championship, he won the silver medal in the Men's park.

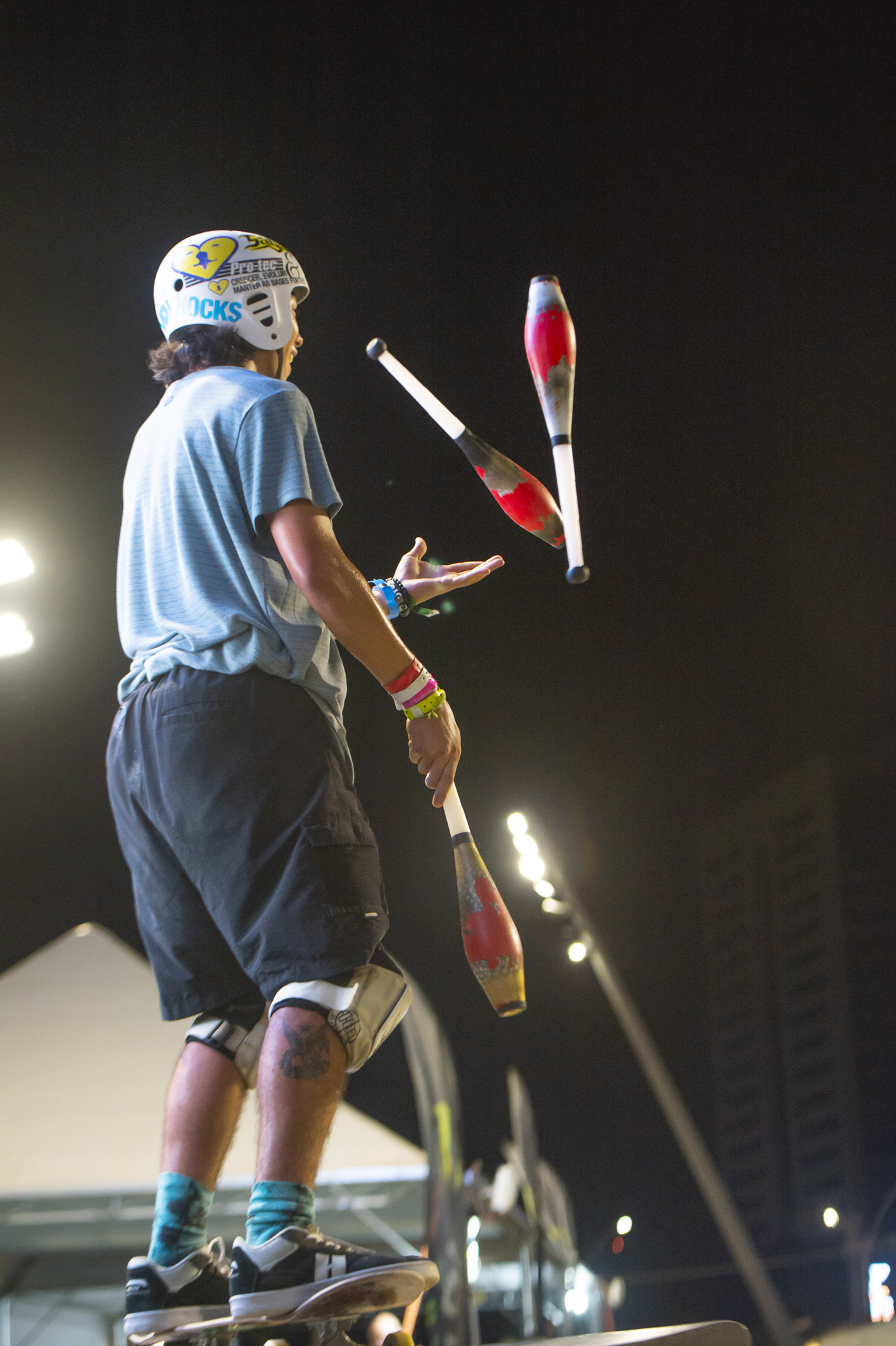
Akio in 2023

At the 2023 Pan American Games held in Santiago, Chile, he won the silver medal in the Men's park. At the 2024 Summer Olympics, Augusto won the bronze medal in the men's park skateboarding competition.

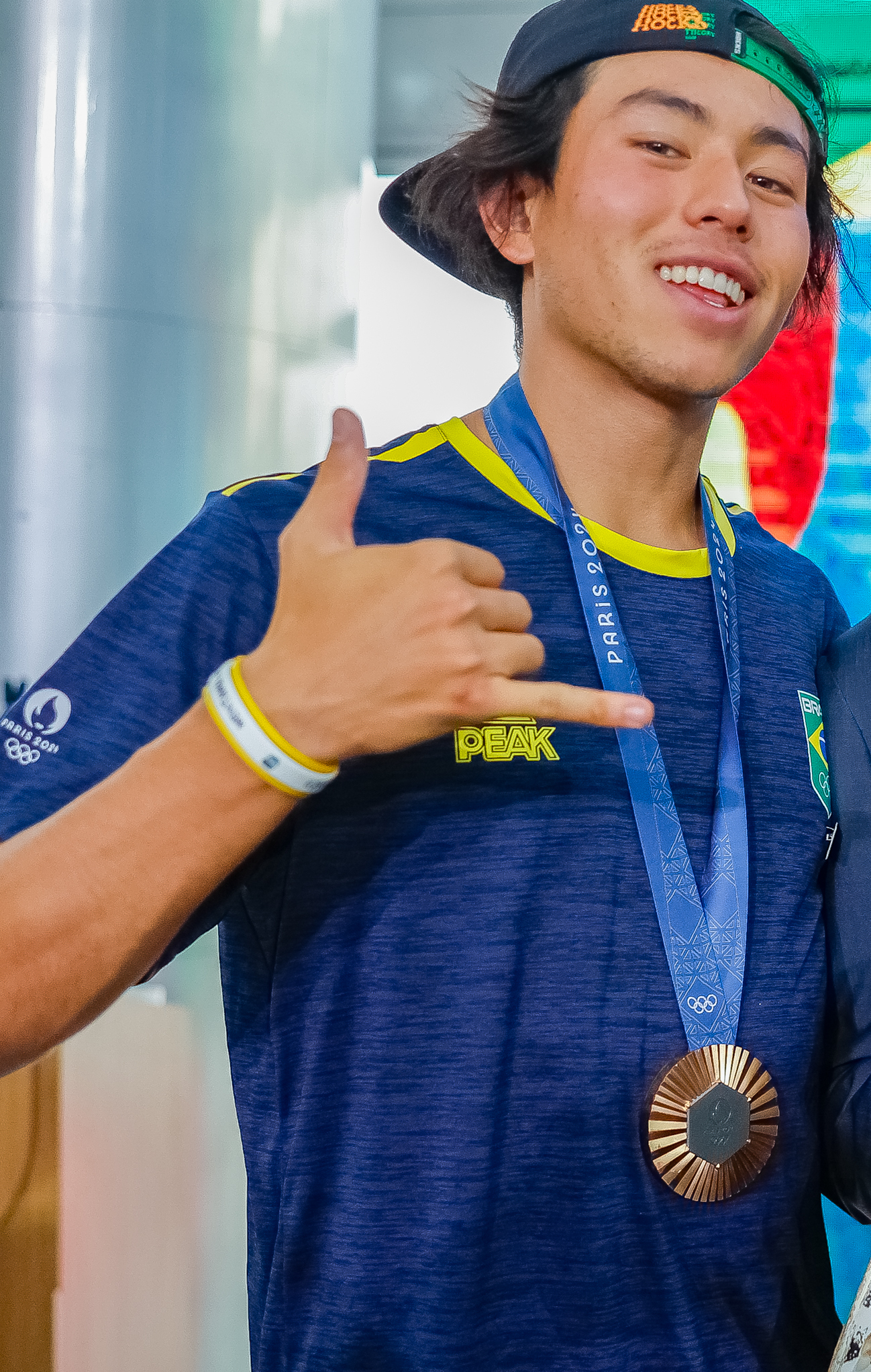
Akio in 2024 with his bronze Olympic medal

In September 2024, Akio became world champion in the skate park, with his compatriot Pedro Barros as runner-up.
