= Alex Sorgente =

American-Italian park skateboarder (born 1997)

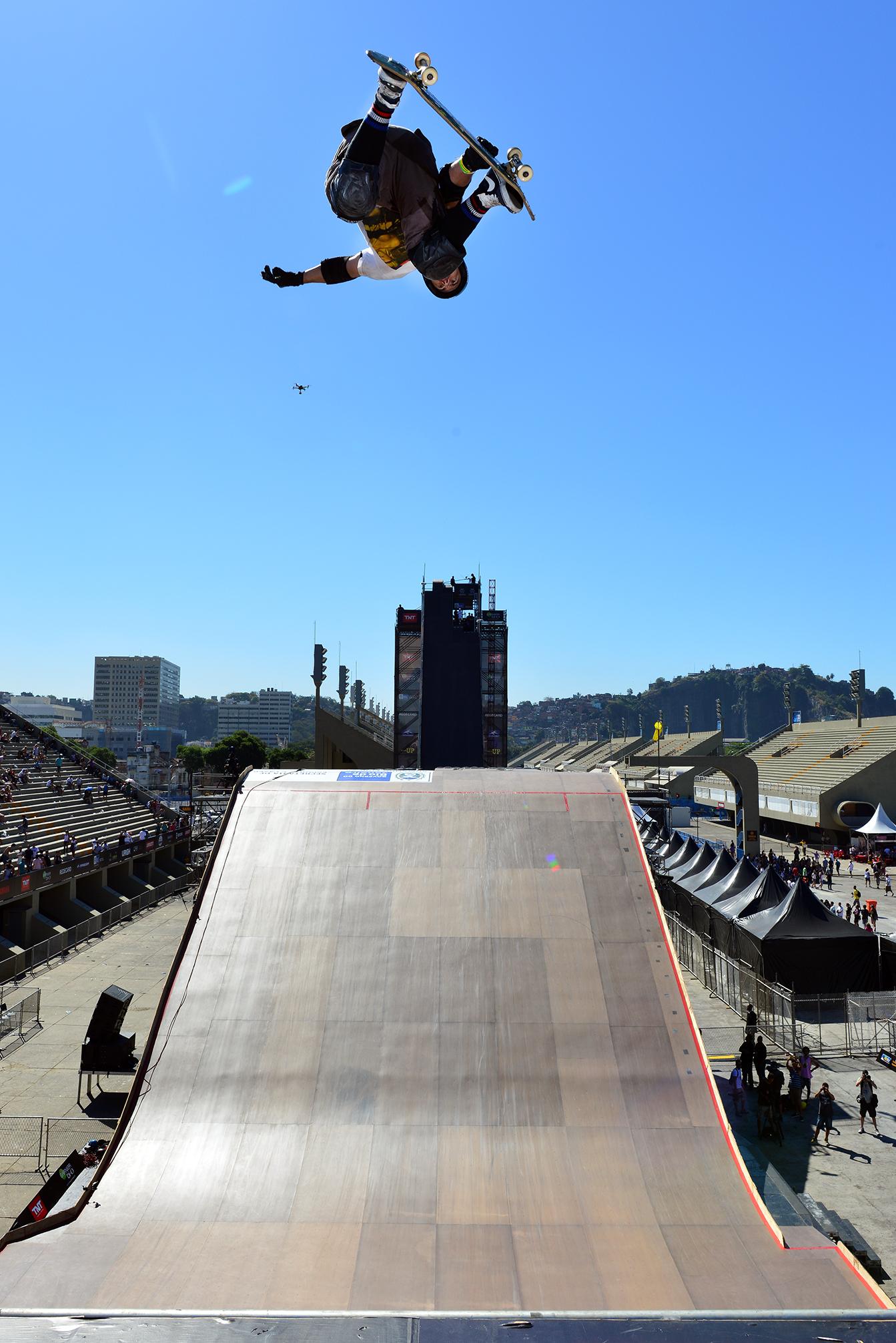
- Sorgente in 2012

Personal information
- Full name: Alessandro Sorgente
- Born: November 26, 1997 (age 28) Boynton Beach, Florida, U.S.

Sport
- Country: Italy (2024–present); United States (2011–2023)
- Sport: Park skateboarding
Medal record
Men's park skateboarding
Representing the United States
World Championships
Gold medal – first place	2016 Malmö	Park
Summer X Games
Gold medal – first place	2017 Minneapolis	Park
Gold medal – first place	2018 Minneapolis	Park
Bronze medal – third place	2019 Minneapolis	Park
Representing Italy
Summer X Games
Silver medal – second place	2024 Ventura	Park

Alessandro "Alex" Sorgente (born November 26, 1997) is an American-Italian park skateboarder. He competed at the 2016 World Skateboarding Championship, winning the gold medal in the park event. He also competed at the X Games.

Sorgente was set to compete at the 2020 Summer Olympics in the skateboarding competition, but had a sprained ankle. He competed in the men's park event at the 2024 Summer Olympics.
