= Skateboarding at the 2020 Summer Olympics – Men's park =

Olympic skateboarding event

Men's park at the Games of the XXXII Olympiad
- Olympic skateboarding
- Venue: Ariake Urban Sports Park
- Dates: 5 August 2021
- Competitors: 20 from 13 nations
- Winning score: 95.83

Medalists
1st place, gold medalist(s)		Keegan Palmer	Australia
2nd place, silver medalist(s)		Pedro Barros	Brazil
3rd place, bronze medalist(s)		Cory Juneau	United States

The 2020 Summer Olympics men's park skateboarding competitions took place on August 5, 2021 at the Ariake Urban Sports Park in Tokyo, Japan.

== Competition format ==
The twenty participating skateboarders were sorted into four heats of five skaters each for the semifinals (prelims). During the semifinals, each skater did three 45-second runs in their designated heat. The best run score of each skater's three runs built a ranking. The eight top-ranked skaters from the combined ranking of the heats qualified for the final.

== Results ==
=== Semifinals ===
The top 8 skateboarders of 20 advanced to the final.

Rank	Heat	Skateboarder	Nation	Run			Notes
Rank	Heat	Skateboarder	Nation	1	2	3	Notes
1	3	Luiz Francisco	Brazil	~~81.50~~	84.31	~~12.74~~	Q
2	3	Kieran Woolley	Australia	82.69	~~14.48~~	~~70.04~~	Q
3	2	Pedro Quintas	Brazil	~~59.55~~	~~6.47~~	79.02	Q
4	4	Pedro Barros	Brazil	~~73.00~~	77.14	~~18.56~~	Q
5	4	Keegan Palmer	Australia	~~64.04~~	77.00	~~13.17~~	Q
6	3	Steven Piñeiro	Puerto Rico	~~64.11~~	~~68.14~~	76.20	Q
7	3	Vincent Matheron	France	~~70.04~~	74.07	~~67.96~~	Q
8	4	Cory Juneau	United States	~~71.08~~	~~37.56~~	73.00	Q
9	2	Danny León	Spain	~~52.40~~	72.24	~~23.35~~	
10	2	Jaime Mateu	Spain	~~54.66~~	~~48.51~~	69.18	
11	1	Zion Wright	United States	67.21	~~53.87~~	~~8.35~~	
12	2	Alessandro Mazzara	Italy	~~7.78~~	65.25	~~24.58~~	
13	1	Heimana Reynolds	United States	~~42.37~~	~~44.29~~	63.09	
14	4	Ayumu Hirano	Japan	~~58.84~~	62.03	~~38.72~~	
15	2	Tyler Edtmayer	Germany	~~58.33~~	~~51.61~~	61.78	
16	1	Andy Anderson	Canada	~~35.57~~	~~58.50~~	60.78	
17	4	Oskar Rozenberg	Sweden	~~3.83~~	~~28.20~~	56.66	
18	1	Ivan Federico	Italy	~~5.07~~	46.90	~~5.08~~	
19	1	Rune Glifberg	Denmark	~~6.24~~	37.61	~~6.11~~	
20	3	Dallas Oberholzer	South Africa	~~21.68~~	24.08	~~18.21~~	

=== Final ===
The results of the final were:

Rank	Skateboarder	Nation	Run			Notes
Rank	Skateboarder	Nation	1	2	3	Notes
1st place, gold medalist(s)	Keegan Palmer	Australia	~~94.04~~	~~5.86~~	95.83	
2nd place, silver medalist(s)	Pedro Barros	Brazil	86.14	~~73.50~~	~~22.99~~	
3rd place, bronze medalist(s)	Cory Juneau	United States	~~82.15~~	84.13	~~7.00~~	
4	Luiz Francisco	Brazil	~~80.24~~	~~80.62~~	83.14	
5	Kieran Woolley	Australia	~~17.03~~	82.04	~~2.17~~	
6	Steven Piñeiro	Puerto Rico	~~5.20~~	75.17	~~74.53~~	
7	Vincent Matheron	France	~~27.81~~	~~27.41~~	42.33	
8	Pedro Quintas	Brazil	~~4.35~~	~~35.54~~	38.47	

== See also ==
- Skateboarding at the 2020 Summer Olympics – Men's street
- Cycling at the 2020 Summer Olympics – Men's BMX freestyle
