= Luigi Cini =

Brazilian skateboarder

Sport
- Country: Brazil
- Sport: Skateboarding
- Event: Park
Medal record
Men's skateboarding
Representing Brazil
World Championships
Silver medal – second place	2023 Rome	Park

Luigi Cini is a Brazilian skateboarder. He qualified for the 2024 Summer Olympics, where he reached the finals of the men's park event.
