= Roller sports at the 2023 Pan American Games – Men's park =

Men's park at the 2023 Pan American Games
- Venue: Urban Sports Esplanade
- Dates: October 22
- Competitors: 8 from 8 nations
- Winning score: 86.68

Medalists
Gold medal	Taylor Nye	United States
Silver medal	Augusto Akio	Brazil
Bronze medal	Steven Piñeiro	Puerto Rico

The men's park competition of the roller sports events at the 2023 Pan American Games was held on October 22 at the Urban Sports Esplanade in Santiago, Chile.

== Schedule ==
Date	Time	Round
October 22, 2023	16:30	Final

== Results ==
Rank	Skateboarder	Nation	Run			Total				
Rank	Skateboarder	Nation	1st place, gold medalist(s)	Taylor Nye	United States	Total	86.68	~~74.23~~	~~40.25~~	86.68
2nd place, silver medalist(s)	Augusto Akio	Brazil	~~22.59~~	84.12	~~79.00~~	84.12				
3rd place, bronze medalist(s)	Steven Piñeiro	Puerto Rico	~~82.40~~	~~3.30~~	83.24	83.24				
4	Martín Jaque	Chile	~~70.00~~	76.64	~~50.08~~	76.64				
5	William Cortez	Mexico	~~73.16~~	~~63.16~~	74.57	74.57				
6	Omar Cocilova	Argentina	~~86.00~~	~~53.45~~	72.35	72.35				
7	Raphael Scheelje	Peru	~~44.95~~	57.76	~~41.34~~	57.76				
8	Gerald Hopkins	Canada	~~23.95~~	~~17.05~~	31.70	31.70				
