= 2018 European Skateboarding Championships =

The 2018 European Skateboarding Championships was held in Basel, Switzerland, between 31 August and 2 September for street skateboarding and in Malmö, Sweden, between September 3–6 for park skateboarding.

== Medal summary ==
=== Park skateboarding ===
Event	Gold	Silver	Bronze
Men	Simon Karlsson Sweden 72,42	Herman Moller Sweden 70,58	Sam Beckett United Kingdom 69,06
Women	Amelia Brodka Poland 85,11	Lilly Stoephasius Germany 74,68	Shani Bru France 68,61

=== Street skateboarding ===
Event	Gold	Silver	Bronze
Men	Benjamin Garcia France 85,00	Joseph Garbaccio France 82,67	Douwe Macare° Netherlands°° 82,00
Women	Julia Brückler Austria 60,67	Candy Jacobs Netherlands 60,33	Lore Bruggeman Belgium 46,33

°His name is misspelled "Dowwe" in the official scoresheet.

°°Douwe Macare came 4th in the competition, but he was the 3rd placed European, as the third best score was made by the sole competitor from outside of Europe – Argentina's Matías Dell Olio (82,33).
