= Mike Crum =

American skateboarder (born 1973)

Mike Crum (born in Dallas, Texas on December 10, 1973) was ranked as one of the best skateboarders in the world. He is a vert ramp rider and has contributed to the skateboarding industry in many ways including trick invention, endemic entrepreneurship, signature boards, signature shoes and film/media appearances.
