= Melissa Williams (skateboarder) =

South African skateboarder

Personal information
- Nationality: South African
- Born: 12 June 1985 (age 40) Cape Town, South Africa
- Home town: Panorama, Cape Town, South Africa
- Occupations: Skateboarder; musician; entrepreneur
- Spouse: Leon Bester

Sport
- Country: South Africa
- Sport: Skateboarding
- Position: Goofy-footed
- Rank: 44th (June 2021)
- Event: Park
- Pro Tour(s): Dew Tour; Vans Park Series

Achievements and titles
- Regional finals: 2018 Vans Park Series Africa Continental Championships: Women's park – Gold; 2019 Vans Park Series Africa Regionals: Women's park – Gold
- National finals: 2021 South African Skateboarding Championship: Women's park – Gold; 2020 South African Skateboarding Championship: Women's park – Gold

Melissa Williams (born 12 June 1985) is a South African skateboarder.

She competed in the women's park event at the 2021 Tokyo Olympics and was the oldest woman participating in skateboarding at the Games.

== Biography ==
Williams was born and grew up in Panorama, a suburb of Cape Town, and it was there where she started skateboarding at age 12. In her mid-twenties, she lived in London for three years and, as she described, "spent a lot of time skating all the incredible bowls, snake runs, and [skate]parks that England has to offer."

A person of many interests and pursuits, Williams has worked as an interviewer and organizer for Blunt Magazine, played drums for the bands Black Lung and Bilderberg Motel, boxed competitively, been the marketing manager for the South African branch of RVCA, managed operations of several restaurants in Cape Town, and founded and operated a social media and marketing company. She is not a professional skateboarder but rather skates for fun, in addition to surfing regularly. When asked if there is anything she still wants to achieve, considering all she has already accomplished, Williams responded, "…there is so much cool stuff to do in this life. I want to do it all."
