= Puerto Rico at the 2020 Summer Olympics =

- IOC code: PUR
- NOC: Puerto Rico Olympic Committee
- Website: copur.pr (in Spanish)

in Tokyo, Japan July 23, 2021 – August 8, 2021
- Competitors: 37 in 15 sports
- Flag bearers (opening): Adriana Díaz; Brian Afanador
- Flag bearer (closing): Rafael Quintero
- Medals Ranked 63rd: Gold 1 Silver 0 Bronze 0 Total 1

Summer Olympics appearances (overview)
- 1948; 1952; 1956; 1960; 1964; 1968; 1972; 1976; 1980; 1984; 1988; 1992; 1996; 2000; 2004; 2008; 2012; 2016; 2020; 2024; 2028

Puerto Rico competed at the 2020 Summer Olympics in Tokyo. Originally scheduled to take place from 24 July to 9 August 2020, the Games were postponed to 23 July to 8 August 2021, because of the COVID-19 pandemic. It was the territory's nineteenth consecutive appearance at the Summer Olympics. Like on the 2016 Summer Olympics, Puerto Rico left the Olympics with a single gold medal, this time won by Jasmine Camacho-Quinn. Other athletes fell short of their Olympic medal, with Steven Piñeiro finishing sixth in the men's skateboarding street park final, and table tennis player Adriana Díaz losing a match in the third round.

== Medalists ==
The following Puerto Rican competitors won medals at the games. In the by discipline sections below, medalists' names are bolded.

Medal	Name	Sport	Event	Date
Gold	Jasmine Camacho-Quinn	Athletics	Women's 100 m hurdles	August 2

== Competitors ==
Sport	Men	Women	Total
Athletics	3	1	4
Basketball	0	12	12
Boxing	1	0	1
Diving	1	0	1
Equestrian	0	1	1
Golf	1	1	2
Judo	1	2	3
Rowing	0	1	1
Sailing	1	1	2
Shooting	0	1	1
Skateboarding	2	0	2
Swimming	1	1	2
Table tennis	1	2	3
Taekwondo	0	1	1
Wrestling	1	0	1
Total	13	24	37

== Athletics ==
Puerto Rican athletes further achieved the entry standards, either by qualifying time or by world ranking, in the following track and field events (up to a maximum of 3 athletes in each event):

Key

- Note–Ranks given for track events are within the athlete's heat only
- **Q** = Qualified for the next round
- **q** = Qualified for the next round as a fastest loser or, in field events, by position without achieving the qualifying target
- **NR** = National record
- N/A = Round not applicable for the event
- Bye = Athlete not required to compete in round

Track & road events

Athlete	Event	Heat		Semifinal		Final	
Athlete	Event	Result	Rank	Result	Rank	Result	Rank
Andrés Arroyo	Men's 800 m	1:53.09	7	Did not advance			
Ryan Sánchez	Men's 800 m	1:47.07	7	Did not advance			
Wesley Vázquez	Men's 800 m	1:49.06	7	Did not advance			
**Jasmine Camacho-Quinn**	Women's 100 m hurdles	12.41	1 **Q**	12.26 **OR**	1 **Q**	12.37	1st place, gold medalist(s)

== Basketball ==
Summary

Team	Event	Group stage				Quarterfinal	Semifinal	Final / BM	
Team	Event	Opposition Score	Opposition Score	Opposition Score	Rank	Opposition Score	Opposition Score	Opposition Score	Rank
Puerto Rico women's	Women's tournament	China; **L** 55–97	Belgium; **L** 52–87	Australia; **L** 96–69	4	Did not advance			

=== Women's tournament ===
Puerto Rico women's basketball team qualified for the first time at the Olympics as one of three highest-ranked eligible squads at the Bourges meet of the 2020 FIBA Women's Olympic Qualifying Tournament.

Team roster

The roster was announced on 8 July 2021.

Puerto Rico women's national basketball team – 2020 Summer Olympics roster
Players
Coaches

Pos.	No.	Name	Age – Date of birth	Height	Club	Ctr.
PG	0	Jennifer O'Neill	31 – 19 April 1990	1.65 m (5 ft 5 in)	Samara	(Russia)
F	1	Tayra Meléndez	27 – 29 October 1993	1.70 m (5 ft 7 in)	Gigantes de Carolina	(Puerto Rico)
PG	5	Pamela Rosado	35 – 30 April 1986	1.65 m (5 ft 5 in)	Atenienses de Manatí	(Puerto Rico)
SG	9	Allison Gibson	28 – 27 March 1993	1.91 m (6 ft 3 in)	Gigantes de Carolina	(Puerto Rico)
F	10	Jada Stinson	21 – 28 September 1999	1.73 m (5 ft 8 in)	Arkansas State Red Wolves	(United States)
G	12	Dayshalee Salamán	31 – 17 March 1990	1.65 m (5 ft 5 in)	Cangrejeras de Santurce	(Puerto Rico)
SG	24	Jazmon Gwathmey	28 – 24 January 1993	1.88 m (6 ft 2 in)	Geas Basket	(Italy)
PF	25	Isalys Quiñones	23 – 23 October 1997	1.91 m (6 ft 3 in)	Tarbes Gespe Bigorre	(France)
F	28	Sabrina Lozada-Cabbage	24 – 3 January 1997	1.87 m (6 ft 2 in)	Geas Basket	(Italy)
C	33	India Pagán	22 – 7 January 1999	1.87 m (6 ft 2 in)	Stony Brook Seawolves	(United States)
G	55	Jacqueline Benítez	24 – 6 June 1997	1.55 m (5 ft 1 in)	KK Šiauliai	(Lithuania)
G	91	Michelle González	31 – 3 August 1989	1.68 m (5 ft 6 in)	Cangrejeras de Santurce	(Puerto Rico)

Head coach

- (Puerto Rico) Jerry Batista

Assistant coach(es)

- (Puerto Rico) Carlos Calcaño
- (Puerto Rico) Daniel Ortiz

Legend

- **Club** – describes last
  club before the tournament
- **Age** – describes age
  on 26 July 2021

Group play

Pos	Team	Pld	W	L	PF	PA	PD	Pts	Qualification
1	China	3	3	0	247	191	+56	**6**	Quarterfinals
2	Belgium	3	2	1	234	196	+38	**5**	Quarterfinals
3	Australia	3	1	2	240	230	+10	**4**	Quarterfinals
4	Puerto Rico	3	0	3	176	280	−104	**3**	

Source: TOCOG and FIBA
Rules for classification: 1) classification points; 2) head-to-head results; 3) head-to-head game points difference; 4) head-to-head number of game points scored.

27 July 2021
21:00
v

Boxscore

Puerto Rico	55–**97**	**China**
Scoring by quarter: 17–**32**, 9–**21**, 13–**18**, 16–**26**
Pts: Rosado 14; Rebs: Quiñones 5 Asts: Gwathmey 4		Pts: Li Yue. 21; Rebs: Han 14; Asts: Huang 7

Saitama Super Arena, Saitama
Referees: Takaki Kato (JPN), Maj Forsberg (DEN), Samir Abaakil (MAR)

30 July 2021
10:00
v

Boxscore

**Belgium**	**87**–52	Puerto Rico
Scoring by quarter: **23**–16, **20**–8, **17**–13, **27**–15
Pts: Meesseman 26; Rebs: Meesseman 15; Asts: Allemand 7		Pts: Gwathmey 20; Rebs: Gwathmey, Meléndez 5 Asts: Rosado 5

Saitama Super Arena, Saitama
Referees: Maripier Malo (CAN), Yu Jung (TPE), Kingsley Ojeaburu (NGA)

2 August 2021
21:00
v

Boxscore

**Australia**	**96**–69	Puerto Rico
Scoring by quarter: 22–**24**, **23**–20, **23**–8, **28**–17
Pts: Tolo 26; Rebs: Tolo 17; Asts: Mitchell 6		Pts: Gwathmey 26; Rebs: Gibson, Gwathmey 6 Asts: Meléndez, Rosado 3

Saitama Super Arena, Saitama
Referees: Alexander Glišić (SRB), Samir Abaakil (MAR), Gizella Györgyi (NOR)

== Boxing ==
Puerto Rico entered one boxer into the Olympic tournament. With the cancellation of the 2021 Pan American Qualification Tournament in Buenos Aires, Argentina, Yankiel Rivera finished among the top five of the men's flyweight category to book his place in the Puerto Rican squad based on the IOC's Boxing Task Force Rankings for the Americas.

Athlete	Event	Round of 32	Round of 16	Quarterfinals	Semifinals	Final	
Athlete	Event	Opposition Result	Opposition Result	Opposition Result	Opposition Result	Opposition Result	Rank
Yankiel Rivera	Men's flyweight	Bibossinov (KAZ); **L** 1–4	Did not advance				

== Diving ==
Puerto Rico received an invitation from FINA to send a diver competing in the men's platform to the Olympics based on his results at the 2021 FINA World Cup series.

Athlete	Event	Preliminary		Semifinal		Final	
Athlete	Event	Points	Rank	Points	Rank	Points	Rank
Rafael Quintero	Men's 10 m platform	396.90	12 **Q**	397.55	14	Did not advance	

== Equestrian ==
Puerto Rico entered one eventing rider into the Olympic equestrian competition, by finishing in the top two, outside the group selection, of the individual FEI Olympic Rankings for Group E (Central and South America).

=== Eventing ===
Athlete	Horse	Event	Dressage		Cross-country			Jumping						Total	
Athlete	Horse	Event	Dressage		Cross-country			Qualifier			Final			Total	
Athlete	Horse	Event	Penalties	Rank	Penalties	Total	Rank	Penalties	Total	Rank	Penalties	Total	Rank	Penalties	Rank
Lauren Billys	Castle Larchfield Purdy	Individual	39.90	54	Eliminated			Did not advance							

== Golf ==
Puerto Rico entered two golfers (one per gender) into the Olympic tournament. Rafael Campos (world no. 281) and Maria Fernanda Torres (world no. 185) qualified directly among the top 60 eligible players for their respective events based on the IGF World Rankings.

Athlete	Event	Round 1	Round 2	Round 3	Round 4	Total		
Athlete	Event	Score	Score	Score	Score	Score	Par	Rank
Rafael Campos	Men's	73	73	70	72	288	+4	=57
Maria Fernanda Torres	Women's	73	77	70	67	287	+3	48

== Judo ==
Puerto Rico qualified three judoka (one man and two women) for each of the following weight classes at the Games. Two-time Olympian Melissa Mojica (women's heavyweight, +78 kg) and Rio 2016 Olympian María Pérez (women's middleweight, 70 kg) were selected among the top 18 judoka of their respective weight classes based on the IJF World Ranking List of June 28, 2021, while rookie Adrián Gandía (men's half-middleweight, 81 kg) accepted a continental berth from the Americas as the nation's top-ranked judoka outside of direct qualifying position.

Athlete	Event	Round of 64	Round of 32	Round of 16	Quarterfinals	Semifinals	Repechage	Final / BM	
Athlete	Event	Opposition Result	Opposition Result	Opposition Result	Opposition Result	Opposition Result	Opposition Result	Opposition Result	Rank
Adrián Gandía	Men's −81 kg	Bye	Casse (BEL); **L** 01–11	Did not advance					
María Pérez	Women's −70 kg	—N/a	Howell (GBR); **W** 10–00	Arai (JPN); **L** 00–10	Did not advance				
Melissa Mojica	Women's +78 kg	—N/a	Nunes (POR); **L** 00–10	Did not advance					

== Rowing ==
Puerto Rico qualified one boat in the women's single sculls for the Games by finishing fifth in the A-final and securing the last of five berths available at the 2021 FISA Americas Olympic Qualification Regatta in Rio de Janeiro, Brazil, signifying the country's return to the sport for the first time since 1988.

Athlete	Event	Heats		Repechage		Quarterfinals		Semifinals		Final	
Athlete	Event	Time	Rank	Time	Rank	Time	Rank	Time	Rank	Time	Rank
Veronica Toro	Women's single sculls	8:11.57	3 **QF**	Bye		8:35.32	6 **SC/D**	7:53.36	5 **FD**	7:57.22	22

Qualification Legend: FA=Final A (medal); FB=Final B (non-medal); FC=Final C (non-medal); FD=Final D (non-medal); FE=Final E (non-medal); FF=Final F (non-medal); SA/B=Semifinals A/B; SC/D=Semifinals C/D; SE/F=Semifinals E/F; QF=Quarterfinals; R=Repechage

== Sailing ==
Puerto Rican sailors qualified one boat in each of the following classes through the class-associated World Championships, Pan American Games, and the continental regattas, marking the country's recurrence to the sport for the first time after sixteen years.

Athlete	Event	Race													Net points	Final rank
Athlete	Event	1	2	3	4	5	6	7	8	9	10	11	12	M*	Net points	Final rank
Enrique Figueroa; Gretchen Ortiz	Mixed Nacra 17	15	16	16	18	18	~~19~~	4	17	19	15	18	18	EL	174	17

M = Medal race; EL = Eliminated – did not advance into the medal race

== Shooting ==
Puerto Rico granted an invitation from ISSF to send Rio 2016 Olympian Yarimar Mercado in the women's rifle shooting to the Olympics, as long as the minimum qualifying score (MQS) was fulfilled by June 6, 2021.

Athlete	Event	Qualification		Final	
Athlete	Event	Points	Rank	Points	Rank
Yarimar Mercado	Women's 50 m rifle 3 positions	1157	28	Did not advance	

== Skateboarding ==
Puerto Rico entered two skateboarders to compete across all events at the Games. Steven Piñero and Manny Santiago were automatically selected among the top 16 eligible skateboarders in the men's park and men's street, respectively, based on the World Skate Olympic Rankings of June 30, 2021.

Athlete	Event	Qualification		Final	
Athlete	Event	Points	Rank	Points	Rank
Steven Piñeiro	Men's park	76.20	6 **Q**	75.17	6
Manny Santiago	Men's street	5.45	19	Did not advance	

== Swimming ==
Puerto Rico received a universality invitation from FINA to send two top-ranked swimmers (one per gender) in their respective individual events to the Olympics, based on the FINA Points System of June 28, 2021.

Athlete	Event	Heat		Semifinal		Final	
Athlete	Event	Time	Rank	Time	Rank	Time	Rank
Jarod Arroyo	Men's 200 m individual medley	2:01.92	39	Did not advance			
Jarod Arroyo	Men's 400 m individual medley	4:17.46	22	—N/a		Did not advance	
Miriam Sheehan	Women's 100 m freestyle	56.64	38	Did not advance			
Miriam Sheehan	Women's 100 m butterfly	1:02.49	31	Did not advance			

== Table tennis ==
Puerto Rico entered three athletes into the table tennis competition at the Games. Rio 2016 Olympian Adriana Díaz secured an outright berth in the women's singles with a gold-medal victory at the 2019 Pan American Games in Lima, Peru. Adriana's older sister Melanie Díaz, with Brian Afanador joining them to compete on the men's side at his second consecutive Games, scored the initial-stage final match triumphs to book one of the available places each in their respective singles events at the Latin American Qualification Tournament in Rosario, Argentina.

Athlete	Event	Preliminary	Round 1	Round 2	Round 3	Round of 16	Quarterfinals	Semifinals	Final / BM	
Athlete	Event	Opposition Result	Opposition Result	Opposition Result	Opposition Result	Opposition Result	Opposition Result	Opposition Result	Opposition Result	Rank
Brian Afanador	Men's singles	Bye	Lam S H (HKG); **L** 3–4	Did not advance						
Adriana Díaz	Women's singles	Bye			Liu J (AUT); **L** 0–4	Did not advance				
Melanie Díaz	Women's singles	Bye	Paranang (THA); **L** 0–4	Did not advance						

== Taekwondo ==
Puerto Rico entered one athlete into the taekwondo competition at the Games. American-born taekwondo practitioner Victoria Stambaugh secured a spot in the women's flyweight category (49 kg) with a top two finish at the 2020 Pan American Qualification Tournament in San José, Costa Rica.

Athlete	Event	Round of 16	Quarterfinals	Semifinals	Repechage	Final / BM	
Athlete	Event	Opposition Result	Opposition Result	Opposition Result	Opposition Result	Opposition Result	Rank
Victoria Stambaugh	Women's −49 kg	Semberg (ISR); **L** 2–22	Did not advance				

== Wrestling ==
Puerto Rico qualified one wrestler for the men's freestyle 74 kg into the Olympic competition, by progressing to the top two finals at the 2020 Pan American Qualification Tournament in Ottawa, Canada.

Key:

- VT (ranking points: 5–0 or 0–5) – Victory by fall.
- VB (ranking points: 5–0 or 0–5) – Victory by injury (VF for forfeit, VA for withdrawal or disqualification)
- PP (ranking points: 3–1 or 1–3) – Decision by points – the loser with technical points.
- PO (ranking points: 3–0 or 0–3) – Decision by points – the loser without technical points.
- ST (ranking points: 4–0 or 0–4) – Great superiority – the loser without technical points and a margin of victory of at least 8 (Greco-Roman) or 10 (freestyle) points.
- SP (ranking points: 4–1 or 1–4) – Technical superiority – the loser with technical points and a margin of victory of at least 8 (Greco-Roman) or 10 (freestyle) points.

Freestyle

Athlete	Event	Round of 16	Quarterfinal	Semifinal	Repechage	Final / BM	
Athlete	Event	Opposition Result	Opposition Result	Opposition Result	Opposition Result	Opposition Result	Rank
Franklin Gómez	Men's −74 kg	Abdurakhmonov (UZB); **L** 0–4 ^{ST}	Did not advance				16
