= Luiz Francisco =

Brazilian skateboarder

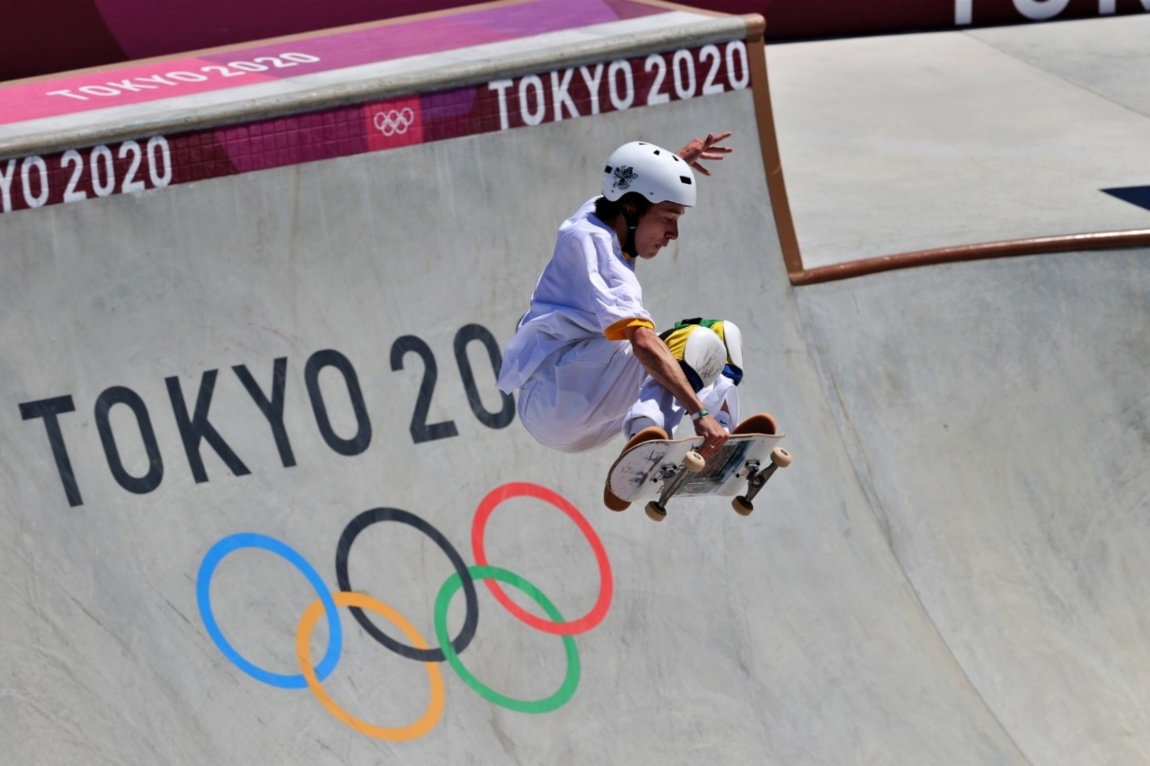
- Francisco in 2021

Personal information
- Full name: Luiz Francisco Canettieri Nunes Mariano
- Born: 24 July 2000 (age 25) Lorena, São Paulo, Brazil

Sport
- Country: Brazil
- Sport: Skateboarding
- Event: Park

Achievements and titles
- Olympic finals: 4th (2020)
Medal record
Men's park skateboarding
Representing Brazil
World Championships
Silver medal – second place	2019 São Paulo	Park

Luiz Francisco Canettieri Nunes Mariano (born 24 July 2000) is a Brazilian skateboarder. He has competed in men's park events at several World Skate Championships, finishing ninth in 2018 and taking silver in 2019. At the 2019 X Games, he was seventh.

At the 2020 Summer Olympics in Tokyo, Japan, he ranked first in the semifinals and fourth in the final of the men's park skateboarding event. The event took place at the Ariake Urban Sports Park on 5 August 2021.
