= Julia Brueckler =

Austrian skateboarder

Personal information
- Native name: Julia Brückler (German)
- Nickname: Ju
- Nationality: Austrian
- Born: 28 November 1989 (age 36) Vienna, Austria
- Occupation: Professional skateboarder
- Life partner: Cody McEntire
- Website: juliabrueckler.com

Sport
- Country: Austria
- Sport: Skateboarding
- Position: Goofy-footed
- Rank: 23rd
- Event: Street
Medal record
Women's street skateboarding
Representing Austria
European Skateboarding Championships
Gold medal – first place	2018 Malmö

Julia Brueckler (also spelled Brückler; born 28 November 1989) is an Austrian professional street skateboarder. She is regarded as one of the first female skateboarders in Austria. Her partner Cody McEntire is also a professional skateboarder.

== Career ==
Julia began pursuing her interest in skateboarding at the age of 12 after being inspired by her male counterparts at the middle school who were all enthusiastic skaters. One of the boys in her middle school gave his board to her and other girls to try and master the sport.

She made her X Games debut during the X Games Austin 2015. In September 2018, she won her first European Skateboarding Championships. She finished 7th at the X Games Minneapolis 2018.

Brueckler made her Olympic debut at the 2020 Summer Olympics in Tokyo, where skateboarding was featured in the Olympic program for the very first time. Prior to the Olympic Games, she was the 23rd ranked women's street skater in the World Skate Olympic World Skateboarding Rankings. She represented Austria in the women's street event and finished in the 18th place.
