= Skateboarding at the 2020 Summer Olympics =

Coordinates: 35.6393°N 139.7855°E

Skateboarding at the Games of the XXXII Olympiad
- Skateboarding pictogram for the 2020 Summer Olympics
- Venue: Ariake Urban Sports Park
- Dates: 25 July – 5 August 2021
- No. of events: 4
- Competitors: 80 from 25 nations

Skateboarding was an event held in the 2020 Summer Olympics in Tokyo, Japan. It was the debut appearance of skateboarding at the Summer Olympics. Skateboarding was one of four new sports added to the Olympic program for 2020; it is also provisionally approved for the 2024 Summer Olympic games. The proposal to add skateboarding to the Olympics was approved in August 2016.

== Qualification ==
There were 80 quota spots available for skateboarding. Each event had 20 competitors: three qualified from the World Championships, 16 from the world rankings, and one from the host country of the Olympics, Japan. The qualification for the event was managed by World Skate.

== Events ==
Four medal events were held: Both events consist of two rounds, prelims and finals. The Park and Street events had their own specially designed courses that took into account gender and stance in order to have equality.

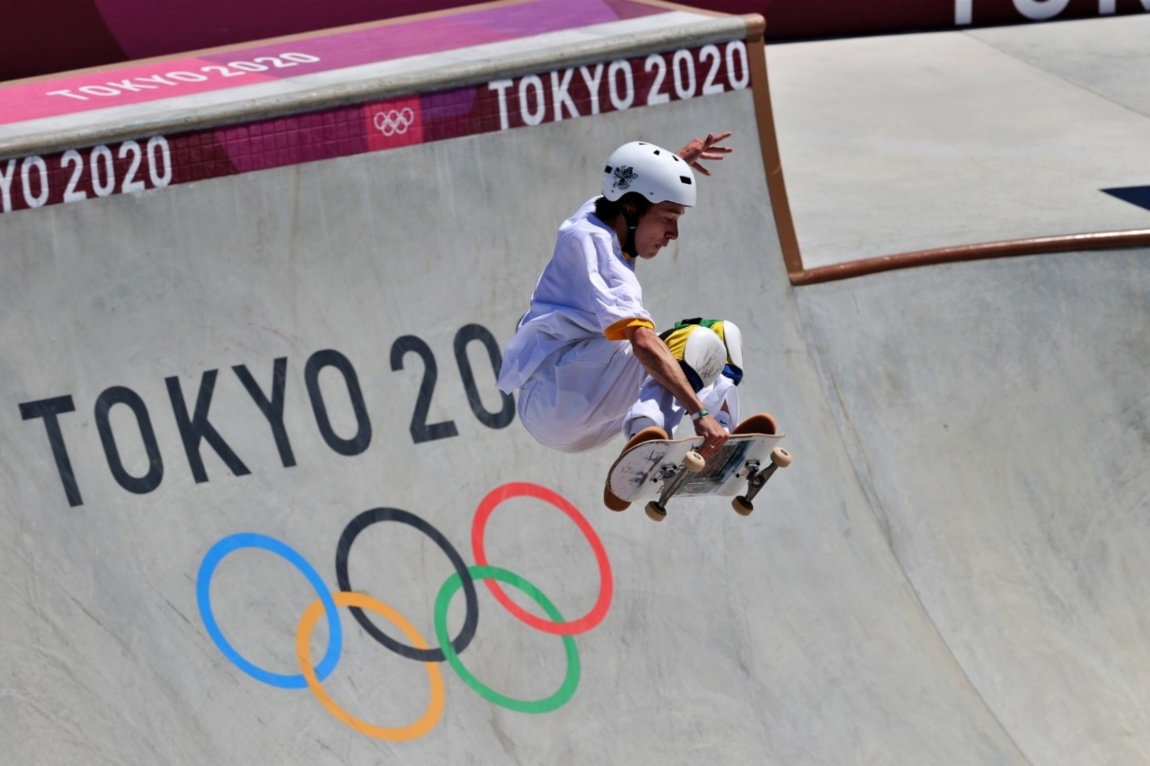
Park

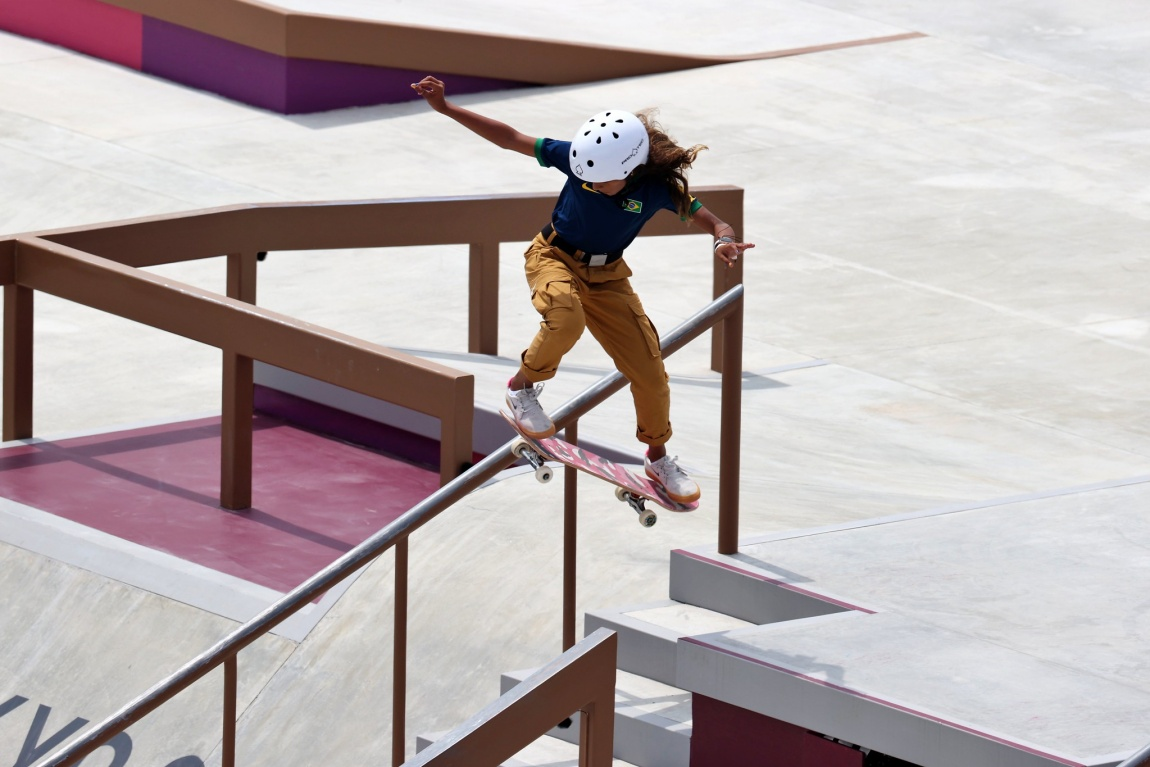
Street

- Men
  - Park
  - Street
- Women
  - Park
  - Street

== Competition schedule ==
All times are Japan Standard Time (UTC+9).

Day	Date	Start	Finish	Event	Phase
Day 2	Sunday 25 July 2021	9:00	13:55	Men's street	Prelims Heats/Final
Day 3	Monday 26 July 2021	9:00	13:55	Women's street	Prelims Heats/Final
Day 12	Wednesday 4 August 2021	9:00	13:40	Women's park	Prelims Heats/Final
Day 13	Thursday 5 August 2021	9:00	13:40	Men's park	Prelims Heats/Final

== Participating NOCs ==
A total of 80 skateboarders from 25 National Olympic Committees (NOCs) participated.

- Australia (5)
- Austria (1)
- Belgium (2)
- Brazil (10)
- Canada (4)
- Chile (1)
- China (2)
- Colombia (1)
- Denmark (1)
- Finland (1)
- France (5)
- Germany (2)
- Great Britain (2)
- Italy (3)
- Japan (10)
- Netherlands (2)
- Peru (1)
- Philippines (1)
- Poland (1)
- Portugal (1)
- Puerto Rico (2)
- South Africa (3)
- Spain (4)
- Sweden (1)
- United States (10)

== Medal summary ==
=== Medal table ===
* Host nation (Japan)

Rank	NOC	Gold	Silver	Bronze	Total
1	Japan*	3	1	1	5
2	Australia	1	0	0	1
3	Brazil	0	3	0	3
4	United States	0	0	2	2
5	Great Britain	0	0	1	1
Totals (5 entries)		4	4	4	12

=== Medal events ===
Event	Gold	Silver	Bronze
Men's park	Keegan Palmer; Australia	Pedro Barros; Brazil	Cory Juneau; United States
Women's park	Sakura Yosozumi; Japan	Kokona Hiraki; Japan	Sky Brown; Great Britain
Men's street	Yuto Horigome; Japan	Kelvin Hoefler; Brazil	Jagger Eaton; United States
Women's street	Momiji Nishiya; Japan	Rayssa Leal; Brazil	Funa Nakayama; Japan

== See also ==
- Roller sports at the 2018 Asian Games
- Roller speed skating at the 2018 Summer Youth Olympics
- Roller sports at the 2019 Pan American Games
- Cycling at the 2020 Summer Olympics
