= Ivan Federico =

Italian skateboarder (born 1999)

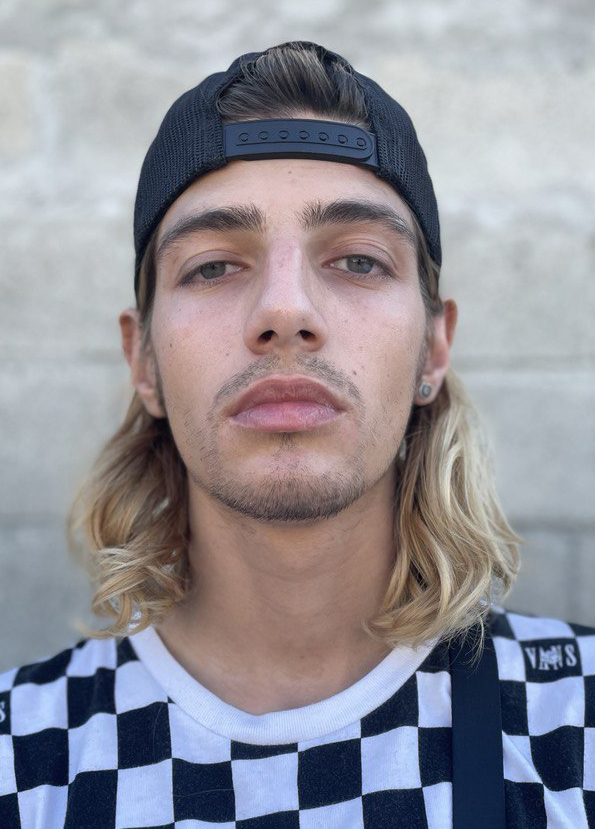

Personal information
- Born: 20 March 1999 (age 27) Cirié, Italy

Sport
- Country: Italy
- Sport: Skateboarding
Medal record
Men's park skateboarding
Representing Italy
World Championships
Bronze medal – third place	2016 Malmö	Park

Ivan Federico (born 20 March 1999 in Cirié) is an Italian skateboarder. He has competed in men's park events at several World Skate Championships, notably winning bronze in 2016. He has also competed at X Games, finishing fourth in 2017 and winning gold in 2019.

He competed in the men's park event at the 2021 Tokyo Olympics, finishing in 18th place.
