= Josefina Tapia =

Chilean skateboarder (born 2002)

Personal information
- Nickname: La Jose
- Born: Josefina Tapia Varas; 25 April 2002 (age 24) Zapallar, Valparaíso, Chile
- Occupation: Skateboarder

Sport
- Country: Chile
- Sport: Skateboarding
- Position: Regular-footed
- Rank: 26th (June 2021)
- Event: Park
- Pro tour(s): Dew Tour
- Turned pro: 2019
- Coached by: Alejandra Varas

Achievements and titles
- National finals: 2018 Vans Park Series National Championships at Chile: Women's park – Gold; 2019 Chilean National Skateboarding Championship: Women's park – Gold; 2020 Chilean National Skateboarding Championship: Women's park – Gold

Josefina Tapia Varas (born 25 April 2002) is a Chilean skateboarder and three-time Chilean National Skateboarding Champion in women's park. She competed in the women's park event at the 2020 Summer Olympics in Tokyo.

== Personal life ==
Tapia Varas is the youngest child of Isaac "Icha" Tapia Figueroa (1953–2015) and Alejandra Varas, two pioneers of surfing in Chile. She has two older brothers.

== Sponsors ==
As of July 2021, Tapia Varas is sponsored by the following companies and organizations:

- Allskateboards
- Banco de Chile
- Deportes Zapallar
- Grizzly Griptape
- KiFit
- Mall Sport
- Naos Kingdom
- Rebull Lola
- Retro
- Stance
- Team Chile
- Vans
