= Ariake Urban Sports Park =

Stadium in japan

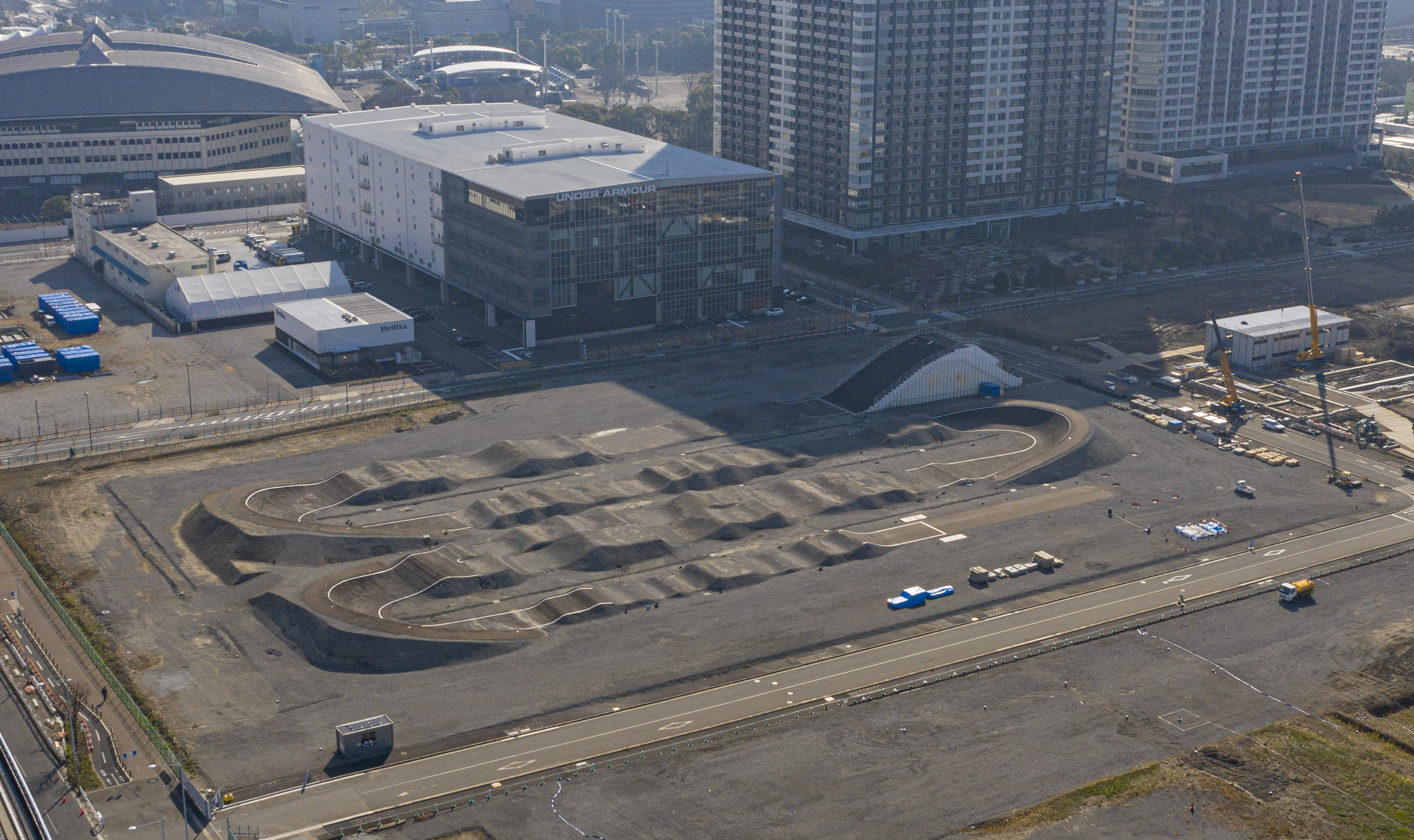
- Aerial view of Ariake Urban Sports Park
- Interactive map of Ariake Urban Sports Park
- Location: Kōtō, Tokyo, Japan
- Coordinates: 35°38′21.6″N 139°47′16.3″E
- Capacity: 7,000 (skateboard); 6,600 (BMX); 5,000 (BMX freestyle)

Construction
- Opened: 2021

Website
- Official website

Ariake Urban Sports Park (有明アーバンスポーツパーク, Ariake ābansupōtsupāku) is an outdoor sports facility located in the Ariake district of Kōtō, Tokyo and built for the 2020 Summer Olympics.

The venue covers a total area of 97,000 m^{2}. The BMX, freestyle BMX and skateboard facility has a maximum capacity of 6,600, 5,000, and 7,000 spectators respectively.

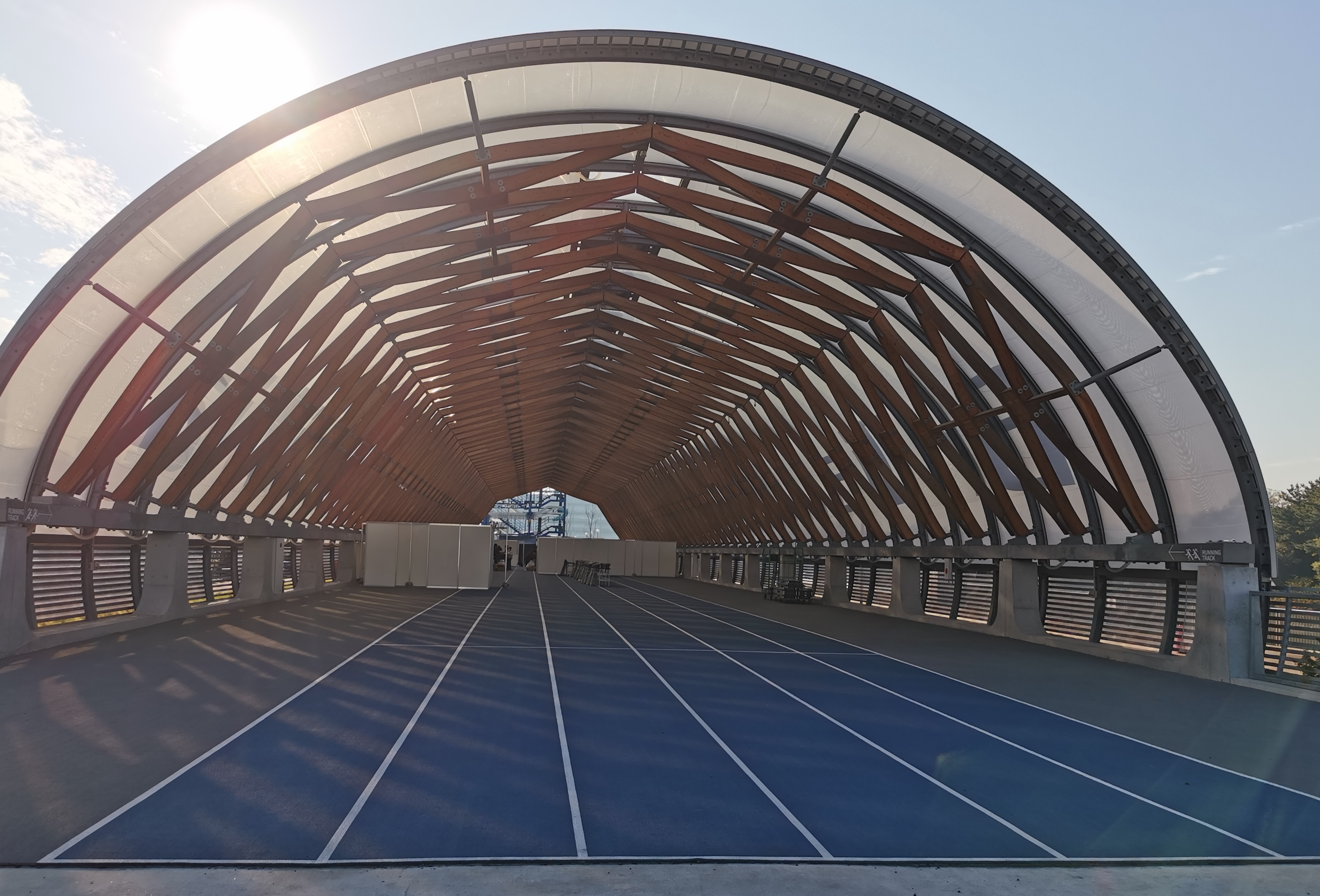
The Brillia Running Stadium became part of this venue in October 2024.

In October 2024, the Brillia Running Stadium, originally located in neighboring Toyosu until November 2023, was integrated into this venue.

== See also ==
- Skateboarding at the 2020 Summer Olympics
- Cycling at the 2020 Summer Olympics
