= Yukito Aoki =

Japanese street skateboarder (born 2003)

Personal information
- Native name: 青木勇貴斗 (Japanese)
- Nationality: Japanese
- Born: 4 September 2003 (age 22) Shimizu-ku, Shizuoka, Japan
- Occupation: Professional skateboarder

Sport
- Country: Japan
- Sport: Skateboarding
- Position: Regular-footed
- Rank: 18th
- Event: Street
- Turned pro: 2015

Achievements and titles
- National finals: 3rd Japan National Skateboarding Championships 2019: Men's street; Gold

Yukito Aoki (青木勇貴斗, Aoki Yukito; born 4 September 2003) is a Japanese street skateboarder.

He placed seventeenth in the men's street event at the 2020 Summer Olympics, the first event of its kind ever included in an Olympic program.
