= Tyler Edtmayer =

German skateboarder

Tyler Edtmayer (born 26 December 2000 in Lenggries) is a German skateboarder. He has competed in men's park events at several World Skate Championships, finishing 24th in 2018 and 18th in 2019.

Edtmayer competed for Germany in the men's park event at the 2021 Tokyo Olympics and the 2024 Olympics in Paris.
