= Heimana Reynolds =

American skateboarder

Heimana Reynolds (born August 1, 1998 in Honolulu) is an American skateboarder. He has competed in men's park events at several World Skate Championships, winning silver in 2018 and gold in 2019. At the 2017, 2018 and 2019 X Games, he finished respectively eighth, eighth and sixth.

He competed in the men's park event at the 2021 Tokyo Olympics, finishing 13th.
