= Andrea Benítez (skateboarder) =

Spanish skateboarder (born 1994)

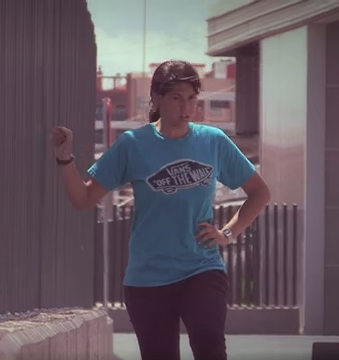

Personal information
- Full name: Andrea Claudia Benítez Rivera
- Born: 29 September 1994 (age 31) Algeciras, Andalusia, Spain

Sport
- Country: Spain
- Sport: Skateboarding

Andrea Claudia Benítez Rivera (born 29 September 1994) is a Spanish professional skateboarder, recognized in that sport at the national level.

== Biography ==
Benítez started skating when she was less than 10 years old and soon after, she learned her first trick, a shove-it. At the age of 12, she received her first sponsor and at age 14, she was already traveling to compete for the different championships. She participated in different international championships such as the World Skateboarding Championship in 2017, where she finished in seventh place.

In 2019, Benítez was in the quarterfinals (with a score of 6.2 and a cut-off mark of 6.6) of the World Skateboarding Championship in the street category, held in São Paulo, Brazil. At the 2019 World Roller Games held in Barcelona, she shared the podium with Mar Barrera. Since it was announced that skateboarding is an Olympic sport for the 2020 Summer Olympics, Benítez seems to be a good candidate. According to the news agency EFE, Benítez is the only Spanish professional skater who aspires to Tokyo 2020.

== Personal life ==
In addition to dedicating herself to skateboarding, Benítez studies electrical engineering at the University of Cádiz. On the other hand, she was the vocalist and guitar of the band Blue Avocados.
