= Asia Lanzi =

Italian skateboarder (born 2002)

Personal information
- Born: 9 January 2002 (age 23); Bologna, Italy

Sport
- Country: Italy
- Sport: Skateboarding

Asia Lanzi (born 9 January 2002) is an Italian skateboarder. She made her debut appearance at the Olympics representing Italy at the 2020 Summer Olympics where skateboarding was also added in Olympics for the very first time. During the 2020 Summer Olympics, she competed in women's street event.
