= Zion Wright =

American skateboarder (born 1999)

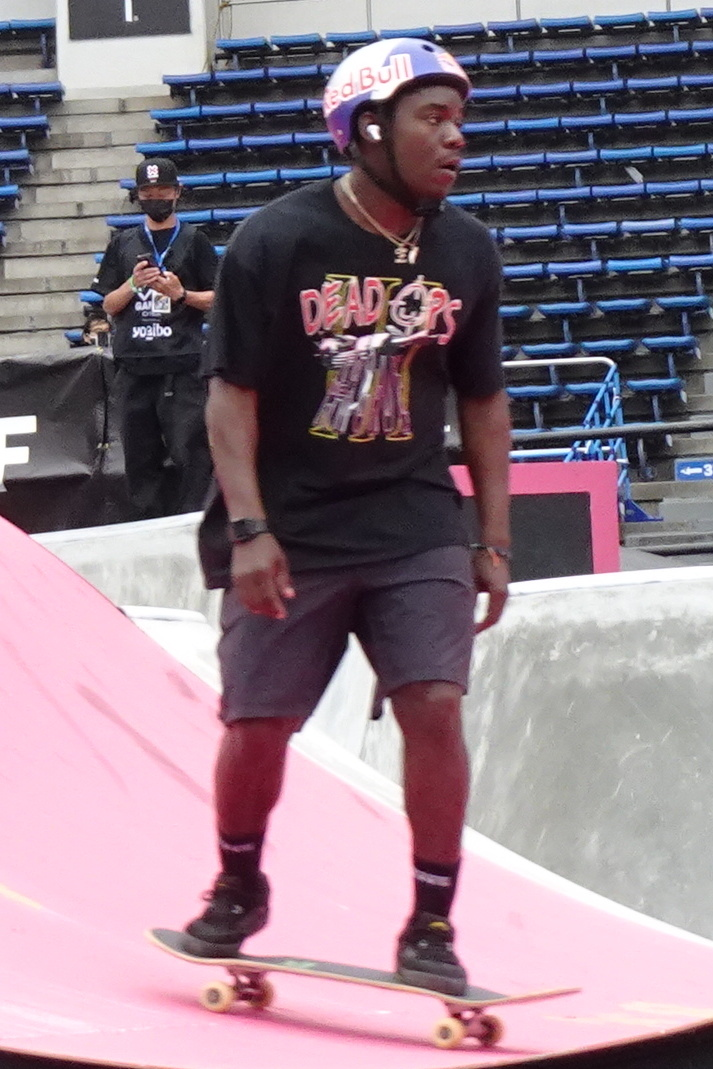
- Wright at X Games Chiba 2022

Personal information
- Born: February 3, 1999 (age 27) Jupiter, Florida, U.S.
- Occupation: Professional skateboarder

Sport
- Country: United States
- Sport: Skateboarding
- Position: Regular footed
- Rank: 5th in Park; 183rd in Street (June 2021)
- Events: Park, street
- Pro tour(s): Dew Tour; Street League Skateboarding; Vans Park Series; World Cup Skateboarding
- Turned pro: 2017

Zion Wright (born February 3, 1999) is an American regular-footed skateboarder. In 2019, Wright solidified himself as one of the newest generation's stars after being named a member of the USA Skateboarding Team.

== Early life ==
Wright grew up in Jupiter, Florida. He first started skateboarding at the age of 4 and quickly became a respected skateboarder in his home state of Florida. At the age of 16, Wright moved from his hometown to Los Angeles, California in hopes of advancing his skateboarding career. The move seemed to pay off as Wright went pro for Real Skateboards in November 2017.

== Skateboarding career ==
=== Videos ===
In 2011, Wright had a part in Florida Daze by Mikey Glover, skating to Houdini by Foster The People. Wright also had parts in the 2013, Florida Daze 2 and the 2015, Florida Daze 3. In 2017, Wright had a part in the Thrasher - Am Scramble 2017 video and in the Real skateboards, By Any Means video.

=== Competitions ===
- 2018 - 1st Place: 2018 Vans Park Series Pro Tour - Huntington Beach, CA
- 2018 - 2nd Place: Simple Session - Tallinn, Estonia
- 2016 - 3rd Place: Tampa Am - Florida
- 2016 - 1st Place: PHXAM presented by Vans - Phoenix, AZ
- 2016 - 2nd Place: Boardr Am - Vista, CA
- 2015 - 1st Place: Harvest Jam Sponsored Finals - Tampa, FL
- 2015 - 5th Place: Damn Am Select Series New York City Finals - New York City, NY
- 2015 - 6th Place: Damn Am Costa Mesa Finals - Costa Mesa, CA
- 2014 - 1st Place: Harvest Jam Sponsored Finals - Tampa, FL
- 2014 - 1st Place: Back to School Bash Sponsored Finals

=== Sponsors ===
As of March 2019, Wright is sponsored by Real, Vans, Red Bull, Thunder, Spitfire, Skatepark of Tampa (SPoT), Bones Bearings, Nixon, Shake Junt, Kreamy Wax, Hot Wheels, Glassy Sunhaters.

Wright is among the 16 members of the inaugural U.S.A. Skateboarding National Team announced in March 2019. As part of the team, Wright qualified for the 2020 Tokyo Olympic Games in the Men's Park division.

== Media appearances ==
Wright appeared as one of the new playable skaters in the 2025 video game Tony Hawk's Pro Skater 3 + 4, a remake of the third and fourth entries in the series.
