= Pedro Quintas =

Brazilian skateboarder

Personal information
- Full name: Pedro Henrique Quintas
- Born: 13 May 2002 (age 24) São Paulo, São Paulo, Brazil
- Height: 179 cm (5 ft 10 in)
- Weight: 79 kg (174 lb)

Sport
- Country: Brazil
- Sport: Skateboarding
- Event: Park

Achievements and titles
- Olympic finals: 8th (2020)
Medal record
Men's park skateboarding
Representing Brazil
World Championships
| Bronze medal – third place | 2019 São Paulo | Park |

Pedro Henrique Quintas (born 13 May 2002) is a Brazilian skateboarder. He has competed in men's park events at several World Skate Championships, finishing 16th in 2018 and taking bronze in 2019.

He competed in the men's park event at the 2021 Tokyo Olympics.
