= Dallas Oberholzer =

South African skateboarder

Personal information
- Nationality: South African
- Born: 27 June 1975 (age 50) Durban, South Africa
- Education: Damelin College; University of Natal
- Years active: 1985–

Sport
- Country: South Africa
- Sport: Skateboarding
- Position: Regular footed
- Rank: 57th (June 2021)
- Event: Park

Dallas Oberholzer (born 27 June 1975) is a South African professional skateboarder.

He competed in the men's park event at the 2021 Tokyo Olympics and was the second oldest competitor in this event, behind Rune Glifberg. He finished 20th in the 2021 competition.

Oberholzer returned to Olympic competition in the 2024 Paris Summer Games, competing once more in the men's park event and finishing 22nd in the prelims. At age 49, he was the second-oldest competitor in the 2024 event. Veteran British/American skateboarder Andy Macdonald was older at age 51.

== Biography ==
Oberholzer started skateboarding in 1985. He graduated 1996 with a bachelor's degree in Business/Commerce from the University of Natal, Pietermaritzburg.

In August 2024, he was the subject of an Associated Press profile article which chronicled his odyssey to the 2024 Paris Olympics.
