= Brandon Valjalo =

South African skateboarder (born 1998)

Personal information
- Born: 11 July 1998 (age 27) Johannesburg, South Africa
- Height: 1.76 m (5 ft 9 in)
- Weight: 72.5 kg (160 lb)

Sport
- Country: South Africa
- Sport: Skateboarding
- Event: Street
- Turned pro: 2018

Achievements and titles
- Olympic finals: 18th Place Tokyo & 12th Place Paris 24’
- World finals: 45th place
- National finals: 4x South African Champion (2014,2015,2016,2021,2024)
- Highest world ranking: 1st National Skate Association Ranking; 5th on Fise World Pro Series; 11th World Cup ranking; 33rd World Skate ranking
- Personal best(s): 1st Youth World Championships (2014); 1st Continental Championships (2017); 1st National Championships (2021); 18th Olympic Games (2021); 1st National Championships (2024); 12th Olympic Games (2024)

Brandon Valjalo (born 11 July 1998) is a South African professional skateboarder who competed in the men's street event at the 2020 Summer Olympics. He also competed at the men's street event in Paris. Valjalo is pioneering African Skateboarding by Hosting events and workshops around Africa including Egypt, Kenya and South Africa to name a few countries.

== Career ==
Born and raised in Johannesburg, Valjalo first stood on a skateboard at the age of three when he found his brother's old board. He initially began skating as a hobby, but he started winning competitions around the age of nine and began to focus on it after that. He drew inspiration from watching Ryan Sheckler on the television show Life of Ryan. He would often have to take long drives around the city to find safe spots to practice.

Valjalo made his debut on the local professional scene in 2013, and then won the South African as well as the world youth championship title at the 2014 Kimberley Diamond Cup. He successfully defended his South African title in 2015 before the Kimberley Diamond Cup was discontinued. Valjalo finished first at the 2017 Ultimate X festival to become the African skateboarding champion, and he joined the World Cup of Skateboarding tour later that year. He also competed at the World Skateboarding Championship in 2019 and 2021, finishing in 45th and 69th place, respectively.

Valjalo qualified for the men's street competition at the 2020 Summer Olympics, earning his spot as number 45 in the World, which made him the number one ranked skater in Africa despite his overall world ranking. At the Tokyo Games, he made history as South Africa's first-ever Olympic skateboarder. Despite breaking his wrist a few days before the preliminary heats, he competed with his arm in a plaster cast and finished 18th overall.
