= Kieran Woolley =

Australian skateboarder

Personal information
- National team: Australia
- Born: 20 November 2003 (age 22) Kiama Downs, New South Wales, Australia
- Years active: 2018 – present

Sport
- Country: Australia
- Sport: Skateboarding
- Event: Park

Achievements and titles
- Olympic finals: 5th (2020)
Medal record
Men's skateboarding
Representing Australia
X Games
| Silver medal – second place | 2024 Chiba | Park |

Kieran Woolley (born 20 November 2003) is an Australian skateboarder known for his technical abilities and innovative style. He grew up riding motorcycles, surfing and skating on the South Coast of New South Wales, Australia. He first competed in skateboarding at the age of 12 and soon won Junior and later Senior Australian Street, Bowl and Park Championships. Woolley is currently ranked #4 in the World Skate male park rankings and competed at the 2024 Summer Olympics.

== Career ==
At the Summer X Games USA in 2022 Woolley placed first, the first Australian to win gold in Park Skateboarding. At the 2022 World Championships in Dubai he placed 4th. He was named as a finalist for the Australian Institute of Sport (AIS) Sport Performance Awards (ASPA) Male Athlete of the Year in 2022.

Woolley competed in the men's park event at the 2020 Tokyo Olympics. He came second in the Preliminary Heats with a better rank than Keegan Palmer. However, an error in the final cost him dearly and he finished fifth in the Final.
