= Lore Bruggeman =

Belgian skateboarder (born 2002)

Personal information
- Born: 30 April 2002 (age 24) Deerlijk, Belgium

Sport
- Country: Belgium
- Sport: Skateboarding
Medal record
Representing Belgium
European Skateboarding Championships
| Bronze medal – third place | 2018 Basel | Street |

Lore Bruggeman (born 30 April 2002) is a Belgian skateboarder. She made her debut appearance at the Olympics representing Belgium at the 2020 Summer Olympics where skateboarding was also added in Olympics for the very first time. During the 2020 Summer Olympics, she competed in women's street event.
