= Jake Ilardi =

American skateboarder

Personal information
- Born: March 11, 1997 (age 28) Osprey, Florida, U.S.

Sport
- Country: United States
- Sport: Skateboarding

Jake Ilardi (born March 11, 1997) is an American skateboarder.

Ilardi qualified to compete in the 2020 Tokyo Olympics as part of the first-ever U.S. Olympic skateboarding team.

== Career highlights ==
Rank	Year	Event	Competition	Location
2	2018	Street	World Cup Skateboarding	Prague, CZE
4	2018	Men's Bowl	World Cup Skateboarding	Prague, CZE
9	2018	Street	World Cup Skateboarding	Vigo, ESP
24	2018	Street	World Cup Skateboarding	Moscow, RUS
