= Andy Anderson (skateboarder) =

Canadian skateboarder

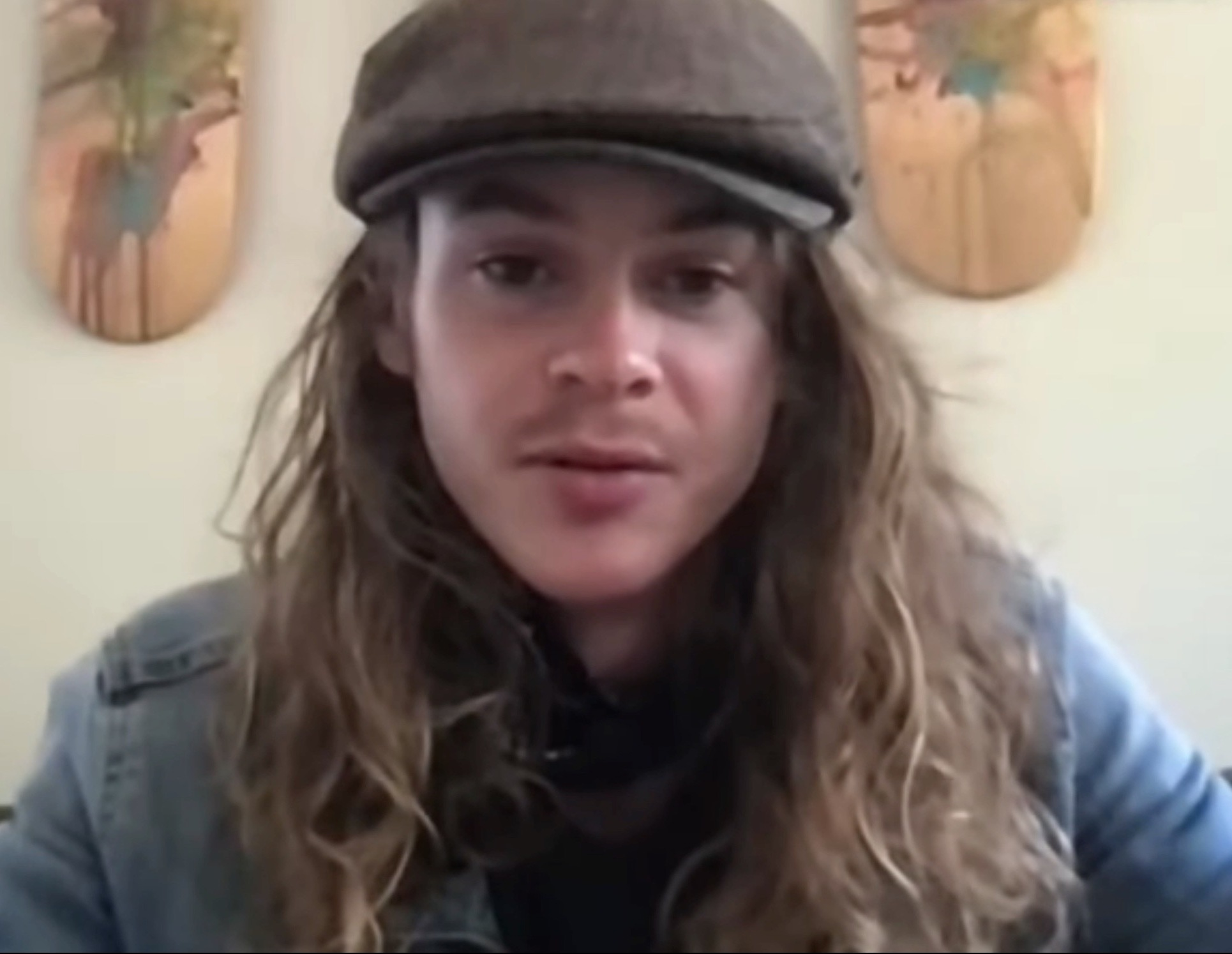
- Anderson in 2021

Personal information
- Born: April 13, 1996 (age 30) White Rock, British Columbia, Canada
- Height: 175 cm (5 ft 9 in)
- Weight: 64 kg (141 lb)
- Spouse: N/a

Sport
- Country: Canada
- Sport: Skateboarding
- Position: Goofy
- Turned pro: 2019

Andy Anderson (born April 13, 1996) is a Canadian professional skateboarder. Anderson is best known for his unique style, which blends freestyle skateboarding of the early decades of skateboarding with more modern techniques. Anderson is known for always wearing a protective helmet while skateboarding, which is extremely uncommon among professional street skateboarders. Anderson represented Canada in the men's park skateboarding event at the 2020 Summer Olympics.

== Career ==
Anderson turned pro for Powell Peralta in 2019, and is currently sponsored by Powell Peralta, Etnies, Skull Skates, Mini Logo, and Bones, along with clothing brands such as Swatch and Skullcandy. Anderson's first pro video part with Powell Peralta was released on December 25, 2020. On March 25, 2021, Anderson starred in Seen Him, a skate film directed and filmed by the Zenga Bros.

Anderson is known in the skateboarding world for a unique style and extensive arsenal of technical tricks. He has competed and placed in the final round of various noteworthy competitions since 2015, including the Zumiez Best Foot Forward Vancouver, the Vans Park Series Americas Continental Championships, the Jackalope Festival, The Boardr Am, the Mystic Sk8 Cup, the Continental Championships, the Nitro World Games, and the semi-finals of the Dew Tour 2021. In the 2018 skateboarding world championships, Anderson placed 21st in the semifinals. In 2020, he won the Canadian Men's Park final, while also placing 10th in the Street skateboarding category. Anderson competed in the 2020 Men's Olympic Park event, placing 16th of 20. Anderson's Olympics-used skateboard can be found in the Olympic Museum.

In the final 2020 Olympic qualifying event (the Dew Tour 2021), Anderson tore his meniscus during a practice run. Despite this, Anderson still competed in the event, finishing 11th in the semifinals upon achieving a score of 75.80 after two successful runs, qualifying for the Tokyo 2020 Olympics. After performing qualifying runs, his third and fourth runs of the event were lighthearted, including a 33-second long manual atop the park exterior.
