= Candy Jacobs =

Dutch street skateboarder

Personal information
- Nationality: Dutch
- Born: 12 June 1990 (age 35) Tegelen, Netherlands

Sport
- Country: Netherlands
- Sport: Skateboarding
- Position: Goofy-footed
- Rank: 8th (June 2021)
- Event: Street

Candy Jacobs (born 12 June 1990) is a Dutch professional street skateboarder. She won the silver medal at the 2018 European Skateboarding Championships. She competed at the World Skateboarding Championships in 2018, 2019, and 2020, and at the X Games in 2011, 2012, 2013, 2016, 2018, and 2019.

She was scheduled to compete at the 2020 Summer Olympics, but had to withdraw due to a positive COVID-19 test while in Japan a few days before the opening ceremony.

Jacobs started skateboarding when she was 13 years old in highschool. She is the owner of a skatepark in Venlo that was opened in 2020. In January 2021, Jacobs underwent knee surgery for a torn meniscus and damaged cartilage after she had been struggling with knee issues for years.
