= Jaime Mateu =

Spanish skateboarder

Jaime Mateu Solivellas (born 28 October 1995 in Palma de Mallorca) is a Spanish skateboarder. He has competed in men's park events at several World Skate Championships, finishing fourth in 2018 and 29th in 2019.

He is set to compete in the men's park event at the 2021 Tokyo Olympics.
