= Danny León =

Spanish skateboarder

Personal information
- Nicknames: El Alquimista del Skate (The Skate Alchemist); Leon de Mostoles (Lion of Mostoles)
- National team: Spain
- Born: Daniel Vallarino León; 1 December 1994 (age 31) Móstoles, Spain
- Occupation: Skateboarder
- Years active: 2017–present
- Height: 175 cm (5 ft 9 in)
- Weight: 68 kg (150 lb)
- Other interests: Surfing; snowboarding; photography

Daniel León Vallarino (born 1 December 1994), known as Danny León, is a Spanish skateboarder. He has competed in several skateboarding events since 2017, including the World Skateboarding Championship, the Dew Tour, and the X Games. He also made his Olympic debut at the 2020 Summer Olympics, where he finished in 9th place in the Men's Park event.

León performed a large aerial skateboarding trick during the August 2026 solar eclipse. The trick was done in an open field, with León launching into the air just as the Moon completely obscured the Sun. The footage attracted widespread attention after León shared footage of the stunt on social media. León described the feat as the "trick of a lifetime" and stated that he and his team were "making history with the eclipse".

== Results ==
Year	Event	Location	Park	Bowl
2017	Dew Tour	Long Beach, California	—	15
2018	Dew Tour	Long Beach, California	15	—
2018	World Skateboarding Championship	Nanjing, China	19	—
2019	Dew Tour	Long Beach, California	12	—
2019	World Skateboarding Championship	São Paulo, Brazil	24	—
2021	2020 Summer Olympics	Tokyo, Japan	9	—
2023	World Skate Pro Tour	San Juan, Puerto Rico	14	—
2023	World Skateboarding Championship	Rome, Italy	13	—
2023	World Skateboarding Championship	Sharjah, United Arab Emirates	27	—
2024	World Skate Pro Tour	Dubai, United Arab Emirates	1	—
2024	X Games	Ventura, California	8	—
