= Sam Beckett (skateboarder) =

British professional skateboarder

Sam Beckett (born 20 April 1992) is a British professional skateboarder. In 2016, he became the first skateboarder from the United Kingdom to win Gold in the Summer X Games.

== Early life ==
Beckett was born in Norwich, Norfolk.

== Career ==
Beckett first began vert skating with his friend and future fellow professional skateboarder Paul-Luc Ronchetti. Due to the lack of appropriate ramps in the local area, the pair had to travel as far as Peterborough and Birmingham to practice. After winning the UK vert series in 2008, Beckett moved to California the following year to further his career. Whilst living there, he joined the Dew Tour, and became the first British skater to land a 720 on a vert ramp. In 2015, Beckett won his first two medals at the Summer X Games, placing third in both the 'Vert' and 'Vert Best Trick' competitions (landing a Backside 540 Ollie rock slide to win the latter). After this initial success, Beckett turned professional and returned to X Games 2016, this time winning the 'Vert' competition outright with his second run in the final, scoring 89.33 in the process.

== Sponsors ==
Beckett is sponsored by Vans, Route One, Madness Skateboards, Monster Energy, Oakley Sunglasses, Dickies, TSG, Bones, and Thunder Trucks.

== Personal life ==
Beckett is friends with fellow professional skateboarder Alex Perelson, living with him when in California. He is a supporter of Norwich City F.C.
