= Oskar Rozenberg =

Swedish skateboarder

Personal information
- Full name: Oskar Fritiof Bruno Rozenberg Hallberg
- Nickname: "Oski"
- Born: 11 November 1996 (age 29) Malmö, Sweden

Sport
- Country: Sweden
- Sport: Skateboarding

Oskar Fritiof Bruno Rozenberg Hallberg (born 11 November 1996) is a Swedish skateboarder from Malmö. He attended Bryggeriets Gymnasium, which had skateboarding in the curriculum. He competed for Sweden at the 2020 Summer Olympics in the park section, ending in 17th place.
