= Keegan Palmer =

Australian skateboarder (born 2003)

Keegan Palmer OAM
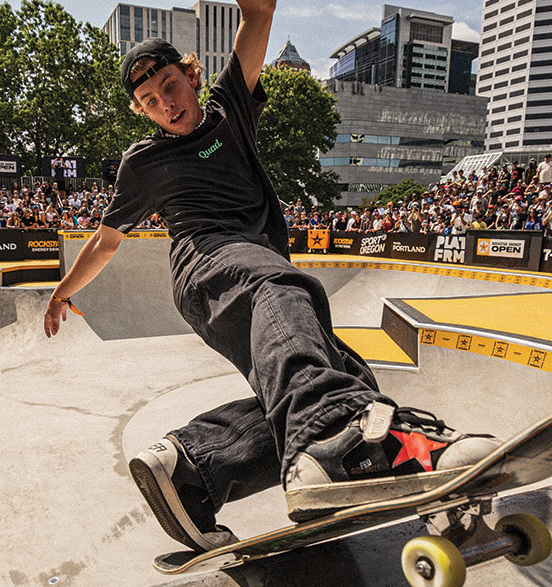
- Palmer in 2024

Personal information
- Born: 12 March 2003 (age 23) San Diego, California, U.S.
- Occupation: Professional skateboarder

Sport
- Country: Australia
- Sport: Skateboarding
- Position: Goofy footed
- Rank: 2nd
- Event: Park
- Club: New South Wales Institute of Sport
- Turned pro: 2018
Medal record
Men's park skateboarding
Representing Australia
Olympic Games
Gold medal – first place	2020 Tokyo	Park
Gold medal – first place	2024 Paris	Park
World Championships
Bronze medal – third place	2018 Nanjing	Park
Summer X Games
Gold medal – first place	[2024 Ventura	Park
Gold medal – first place	2023 Chiba	Park
Silver medal – second place	2023 California	Park
Silver medal – second place	2025 Osaka	Park
Bronze medal – third place	2026 Chiba	Park

Keegan Palmer OAM (born 13 March 2003) is an Australian-American goofy-footed professional skateboarder specialising in park skating. He turned professional at the age of 14. In 2021 at the 2020 Summer Olympics, Palmer won the gold medal in the inaugural men's park skateboarding competition. Palmer became a two-time Olympic gold medalist, winning the men's park skateboarding competition at the 2024 Paris Summer Olympics.

Palmer has been sponsored by Nike SB, Primitive, Oakley, Independent, Bones Wheels, Bronson Speed Co., Mob, and Boost Mobile.

== Early life ==
Palmer was born in San Diego, California, to an American father, Chris, and a South African mother, Cindy, on 12 March 2003. He moved with his family from San Diego to Australia's Gold Coast as a one-year-old. Palmer began skating at two years of age when he joined his father at the local Elanora skate park and competed in the Australian Open skating competition at eight years old. He attended King's Christian College while based on the Gold Coast and was also interested in surfing from an early age but focused mainly on skating throughout his upbringing. Palmer returned to San Diego at 14 years of age in pursuit of a professional skateboarding career.

Outside of skateboarding, Palmer is a fan of the Collingwood Magpies in the Australian Football League after striking up a friendship with Isaac Quaynor during the 2026 Australian Open.

== Career ==
In 2017, Palmer won the Dew Tour Am Bowl Final at age 14. Palmer made his debut in the Dew Tour in 2018, coming 7th in the finals. A year later, Palmer came 3rd in the 2019 Dew Tour finals, finishing behind Pedro Barros and Cory Juneau. In the same year, Palmer came 4th in the Park Skateboarding World Championships in São Paulo, Brazil. In 2020, Palmer won the Skate Australia National Park Championships. In 2021, Palmer qualified for the 2020 Tokyo Summer Olympic Games. On 5 August 2021, Palmer won the gold medal in the men's park skateboarding event at the Tokyo 2020 Summer Olympic Games.

Although locking in a gold medal 7.9 points ahead of his nearest rival, Palmer decided to do a victory lap. In the process, he improved his original score of 94.04 (from his first run) to 95.83 (on his third and final run), finishing 9.69 points ahead of his nearest opponent, Brazilian Pedro Barros.

In the 2022 Australia Day Honours Palmer was awarded the Medal of the Order of Australia.

Palmer achieved an unofficial world record of furthest distance covered towed by a car on a skateboard in March 2024 when he completed a distance of 52 kilometres at Calder Park Raceway, Melbourne, Australia.

In 2024, he became a double Olympic gold medallist, repeating as winner of the Olympic men's park skateboarding event at the 2024 Paris Summer Olympics.
