= Steven Piñeiro =

Puerto Rican goofy-footed skateboarder

Personal information
- Full name: Steven Yancy Piñeiro Pagán
- Born: November 17, 1996 (age 29) New London, Connecticut, U.S.
- Height: 5 ft 10 in (178 cm)
- Website: www.vidabyyancy.com

Sport
- Country: Puerto Rico
- Sport: Skateboarding
- Event: Park

Achievements and titles
- Olympic finals: 6th (2020)
Medal record
Men's park skateboarding
Representing Puerto Rico
Pan American Games
Bronze medal – third place	2023 Santiago	Park
World Beach Games
Silver medal – second place	2019 Doha	Park

Steven Yancy Piñeiro Pagán (Note: In this Spanish name, the first or paternal surname is Piñeiro and the second or maternal family name is Pagán.) (born November 17, 1996) is a Puerto Rican professional skateboarder. He grew up in the Puerto Rican diaspora in Connecticut, New York and Florida (Jacksonville and Orlando) and repatriated to Puerto Rico in 2019. His family is entirely of Puerto Rican descent from the municipality of Toa Baja; his father Steven Piñeiro was born in New York and his mother Elizabeth Pagán was born in Puerto Rico. He is the third child of four siblings. He has competed globally since the age of 12 in skateboarding events. In 2019, he repatriated to his family's hometown Toa Baja, Puerto Rico where he chose to represent Puerto Rico in sporting events moving forward out of a deep love and admiration for his island, its culture and people.

In 2011, when he was 14-year-old, Piñeiro traveled to Australia to participate in Bowl-A-Rama. The day before the event, he broke his wrist while attempting a 7-foot 540. The incident was shown on Season 6, Episode 10 of Bondi Rescue.

In 2019 while representing Puerto Rico he won the silver medal at the World Beach Games in Doha, Qatar.

He competed in the men's park event at the 2021 Tokyo Olympics and came in sixth in the final.
