= Alessandro Mazzara =

Italian skateboarder (born 2004)

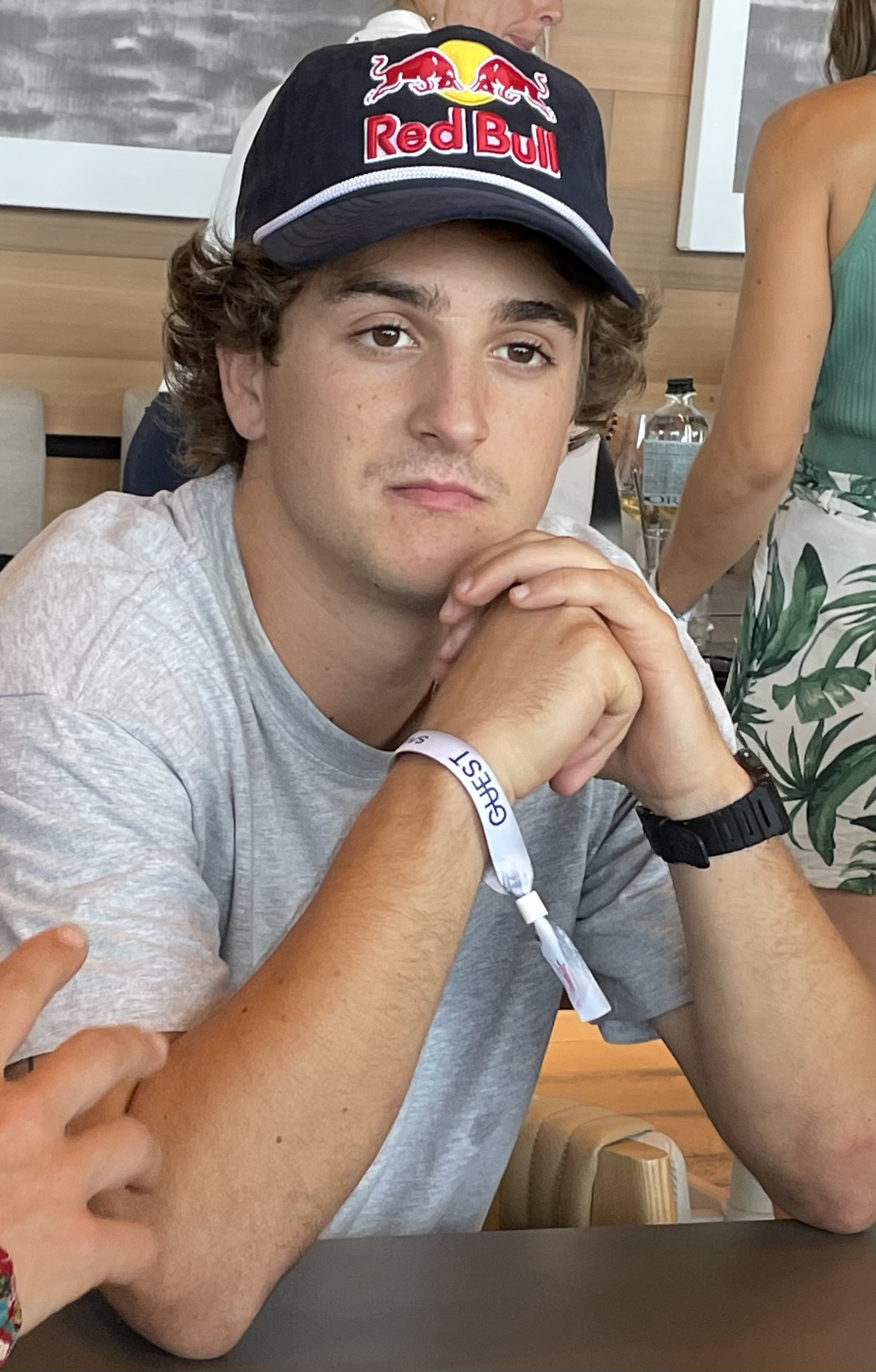

Personal information
- Born: 5 May 2004 (age 22) Erice, Italy

Sport
- Country: Italy
- Sport: Skateboarding

Alessandro Mazzara (born 5 May 2004 in Erice) is an Italian skateboarder. He has competed in men's park events at several World Skate Championships, finishing 34th in 2018 and 15th in 2019.

He competed in the men's park event at the 2021 Tokyo Olympics finishing 12th.
