= Rune Glifberg =

Danish professional skateboarder

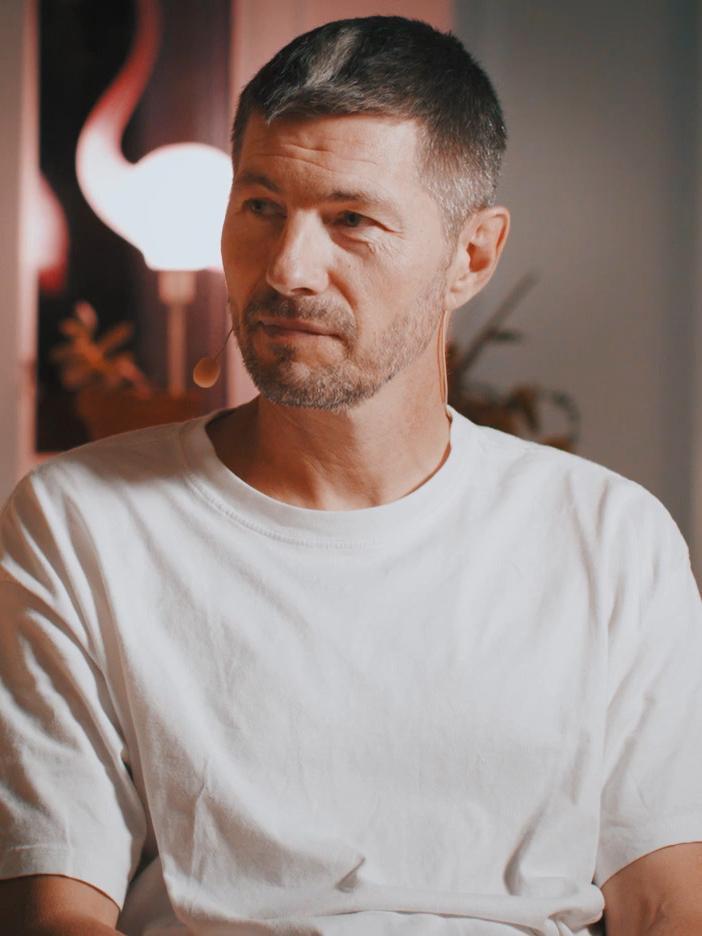
- Glifberg in 2021

Personal information
- Nickname: The Danish Destroyer
- Born: 7 October 1974 (age 52) Copenhagen, Denmark
- Occupation: Professional skateboarder
- Years active: 1985–present
- Height: 180 cm (5 ft 11 in)
- Weight: 73 kg (161 lb)

Sport
- Country: Denmark
- Sport: Skateboarding
- Position: Regular-footed
- Rank: 32nd (Park)
- Events: Park, vert and vert doubles
- Turned pro: 1992
- Former partner: Mike Crum

Achievements and titles
- National finals: Danish Skateboarding Championship 2021: Men's park – Gold; Danish Skateboarding Championship 2019: Men's park – Bronze
Medal record
Men's skateboarding
Representing Denmark
Summer X Games
Gold medal – first place	2008 Los Angeles	Park
Gold medal – first place	2009 Los Angeles	Park
Silver medal – second place	1997 San Diego	Vert
Silver medal – second place	2003 Los Angeles	Vert Doubles
Silver medal – second place	2013 Foz do Iguaçu	Park
Bronze medal – third place	1995 Newport	Vert
Bronze medal – third place	1999 San Diego	Vert Doubles
Bronze medal – third place	2002 Philadelphia	Vert
Bronze medal – third place	2002 Philadelphia	Vert Doubles
Bronze medal – third place	2003 Los Angeles	Vert
Bronze medal – third place	2004 Los Angeles	Vert
Bronze medal – third place	2012 Los Angeles	Park

Rune Glifberg (born 7 October 1974), nicknamed "The Danish Destroyer", is a Danish professional skateboarder. He is one of three skaters to have competed at every X Games. He has a total of 12 X Games medals. At 46, he became the oldest skateboarder to ever compete in the Olympic Games and the first male skateboarder to ever compete in a park event in the Olympic Games when he represented Denmark in the men's park event at the 2020 Summer Olympics in Tokyo.

== Early life ==
Rune Glifberg was born in Copenhagen and began skating at the age of 11 years after a friend brought a skateboard as a gift, which he had bought in the US. He entered his first pro contest in France in 1990 and turned pro in 1992. Glifberg moved from Denmark to Costa Mesa, California, after he finished secondary school in 1995.

== Professional skateboarding ==
In the early 1990s, Glifberg turned professional as a vert skater and relocated to the United States. Glifberg signed a contract with Flip Skateboards and, as of July 2021, he remains a member of the company's professional team.

Glifberg was sponsored by shoe company Etnies at around the same time as he joined Flip and his second signature shoe was called the Forsvar, meaning "defend" or "defense" in Danish. As of September 2012, Glifberg has released a line of signature shoes with Converse that consists of "The Allston" and the "Rune Pro Mid" models.

Glifberg is a playable character in the first five games of the Tony Hawk series of video games that consists of the four Pro Skater games and Tony Hawk's Underground.

== Company owner ==
Glifberg is a part-owner of Pipeline Distribution and runs a Copenhagen-based event company "RunEvent". RunEvent was the organizer of 2010's "Burning of the Witch" skateboard contest at Amager Strandpark in Copenhagen. Burning of the Witch was jointly sponsored by Volcom, one of Glifberg's sponsors, and Thrasher Magazine. RunEvent organized Glifberg's 25th skateboarding anniversary that was held at Fælledparken in Copenhagen during the summer of 2011.

In 2009, Glifberg and architect Ebbe Lykke founded the skatepark design firm Glifberg+Lykke in Copenhagen. The duo have since taken the lead on a number of projects in Europe, including the Streetdome in Haderslev, Denmark; Oslo Skatehall in Oslo, Norway; Skatepark Eller in Düsseldorf, Germany; and the Urban Sport Zone in Amsterdam, Netherlands.

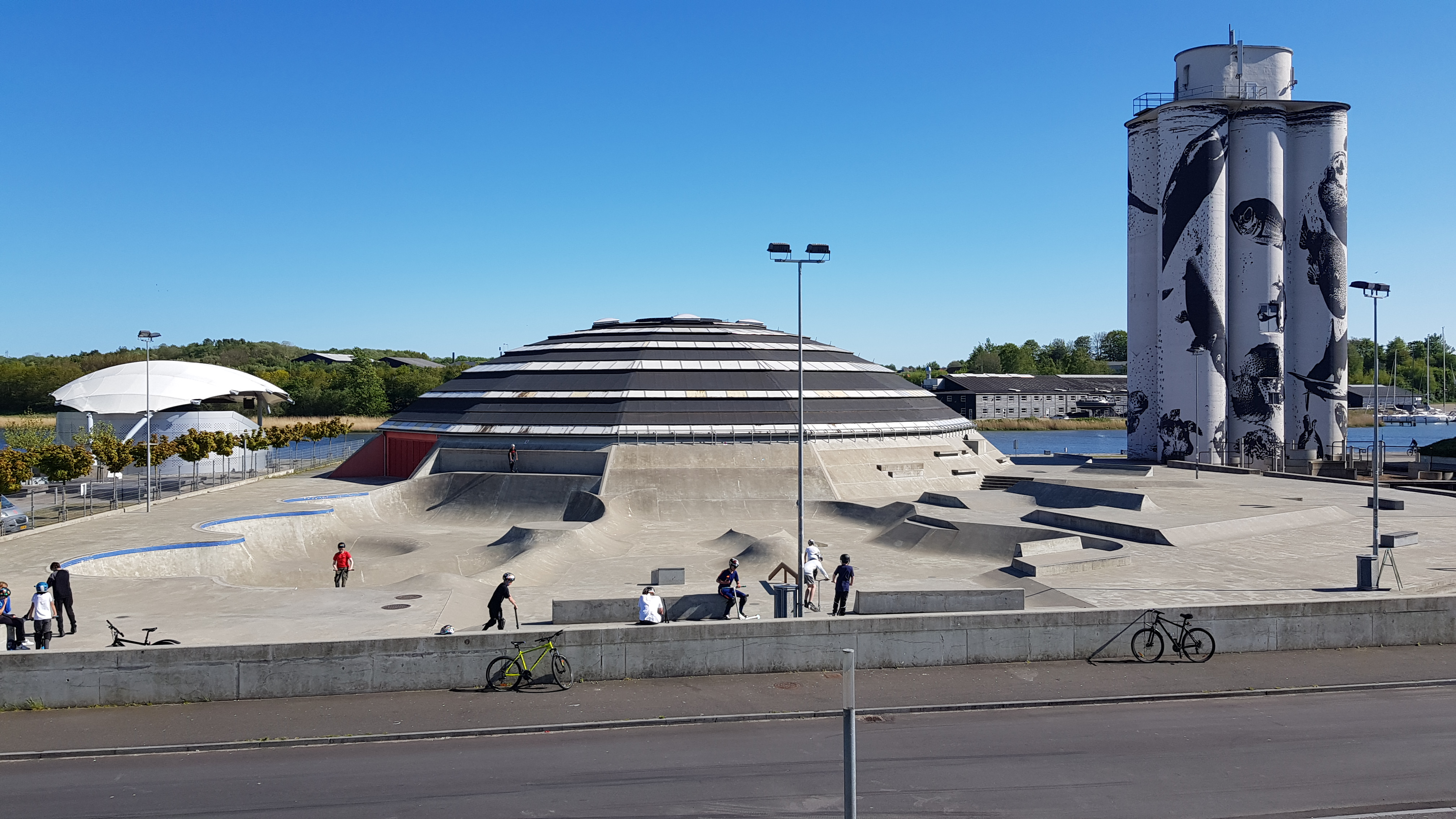
Streetdome in Haderslev

== Personal life ==
Glifberg resided in the United States for seventeen years, living for a period in the Leucadia district of Encinitas, California. He moved back to Denmark in the early 2010s and, as of 2021, is based in Copenhagen.

== Contest history ==
X-Games history:

- Summer 2013 Skateboard Park: 4
- Summer 2013 Skateboard Park: 2
- Summer 2012 Skateboard Park: 3
- Summer 2011 Skateboard Vert: 17
- Summer 2011 Skateboard Park: 7
- Summer 2010 Skateboard Park: 7
- Summer 2009 Skateboard Vert: 7
- Summer 2009 Skateboard Park: 1
- Summer 2008 Skateboard Vert: 10
- Summer 2008 Skateboard Park: 1
- Summer 2007 Skateboard Vert: 7
- Summer 2006 Skateboard Vert: 5
- Summer 2005 Skateboard Vert Best Trick: 5
- Summer 2005 Skateboard Vert: 9
- Summer 2004 Skateboard Vert: 3
- Summer 2003 Skateboard Vert Doubles (Mike Crum): 2
- Summer 2003 Skateboard Vert Best Trick: 6
- Summer 2003 Skateboard Vert: 3
- Summer 2002 Skateboard Vert Doubles (Mike Crum): 3
- Summer 2002 Skateboard Vert: 3
- Summer 2001 Skateboard Vert: 6
- Summer 2000 Skateboard Vert Doubles (Mike Crum): 6
- Summer 2000 Skateboard Vert 5
- Summer 1999 Skateboard Vert Doubles (Mike Crum): 3
- Summer 1999 Skateboard Vert: 12
- Summer 1998 Skateboard Vert: 12
- Summer 1997 Skateboard Vert Doubles (Mike Crum): 5
- Summer 1997 Skateboard Vert: 2
- Summer 1996 Skateboard Vert: 17
- Summer 1995 Skateboard Vert: 3

Competitive history

- 1st place – 2023 Copenhagen Open – Fælledparken Bowl Contest
- 19th place – Tokyo 2020 Olympic Games Park
- 3rd place – 2019 ANOC World Beach Games Qatar Park Mens Qualifiers
- 3rd place – 2019 Men's 15 and Up Danish National Championships in Park Skateboarding Finals
- 2nd place – 2019 Vans Combi Pool Party Masters Finals
- 1st place – 2018 Vans Park Series Europa Continental Championships Men's Prelims
- 3rd place – 2017 Lisboa Stone Crushers: Vert Finals
- 2nd place – 2017 Fælledparken Pro Bowl
- 1st place – 2017 Vans Park Series Men's Continental Championships at Malmö Finals
- 2nd place – 2017 Bowl a Rama Bondi Pro Qualifiers
- 3rd place – 2016 Copenhagen Open Bowl Jam at Fælledparken
- 1st place – 2016 Australian Open of Surfing Finals
- 2nd place – 2015 Copenhagen Open Bowl Jam
- 1st place – 2014 Copenhagen Vert Jam
- 2nd place – 2010 Vans Protec Pool Party
- 2nd place – 2009 Converse Fix To Ride
- 1st place – 2009 X GAMES 15 Skateboard Park
- 1st place – 2009 Copenhagen Pro vert
- 3rd place – 2009 Vans Protec Pool Party
- 1st place – 2008 X GAMES 14 SUPERPARK
- 1st place – WCSK8 - World Champion Skateboarding World Bowl Rankings
- 2nd place – 2008 Copenhagen Pro vert
- 1st place – 2008 Quiksilver Bowlriders Malmo
- 1st place – 2008 Vans Protec Pool Party
- 2nd place – 2008 Bondi Bowl-A-Rama Australia
- 1st place – 2008 Okaley Bowl-A-Rama Wellington, New Zealand
- 1st place – 2007 Copenhagen Pro vert
- 2nd place – 2007 WCSK8 World Bowl Rankings
- 1st place – 2007 Protec Pool Party
- 1st place – 2007 Bowl-A-Rama Australia
- 1st place – 2007 Quiksilver Bowlriders (Sweden)
- 1st place – 2006 Northshore Bowl Jam
- 3rd place – 2006 Desert Dog Park Slalom
- 1st place – 2006 Desert Dog Bowl Bash
- 2nd place – 2006 GVR Etnies Bowl
- 1st place – 2006 Mystic Sk8 Cup: Vert
- 2nd place – 2006 Oregon Trifecta West Linn, Oregon Bowl
- 1st place – 2006 Oregon Trifecta Lincoln City, Oregon Bowl
- 2nd place – 2006 WCSK8 World Bowl Rankings
- 2nd place – 2006 Vans Pro-Tec Pool Party
- 1st place – 2005 Vans Pro-Tec Pool Party
- 1st place – 2004 Mystic Sk8 Cup: Vert
- 3rd place – 2004 Toronto West 49 Open Vert Best Trick
- 3rd place – 2004 Toronto West 49 Open Vert
- 1st place – 2004 Gravity Games: Vert
- 1st place – 2004 Snickers Bowl Games
- 2nd place – 2003 WCSK8 Pro Vert European Rankings
- 2nd place – 2003 Globe World Championships Vert
- 1st place – 2003 Scandinavian Open: Vert
- 1st place – 2003 Tampa Pro: Vert
- 2nd place – 2002 Pro Vert European Rankings
- 1st place – 2002 Scandinavian Open: Vert
- Ranked 1st; World Champion Skateboarding Vert 2001
- 1st place – 2001 Scandinavian Open: Vert
- 1st place – 2001 Gravity Games: Vert
- 1st place – 1998 Slam City Jam: Vert
- 1st place – 1996 Slam City Jam: Vert

== Sponsors ==
Active sponsors as of July 2021:

- Flip Skateboards
- Hazard Wheels
- Indy
- Monster Energy
- Nike SB
- Pro-Tec
- Volcom

=== Former sponsors ===
- Converse
- Oakley
- Ricta
- Etnies
