= Vincent Matheron =

French skateboarder (born 1998)

Personal information
- Born: 15 May 1998 (age 28) Marseille, France

Sport
- Country: France
- Sport: Skateboarding
- Event: Park

Achievements and titles
- Olympic finals: 7th (2020)

Vincent Matheron (born 15 May 1998 in Marseille) is a French skateboarder. He has competed in men's park events at several World Skate Championships, finishing fifth in 2018 and 30th in 2019.

He competed in the men's park event at the 2021 Tokyo Olympics.
