= Cory Juneau =

American skateboarder

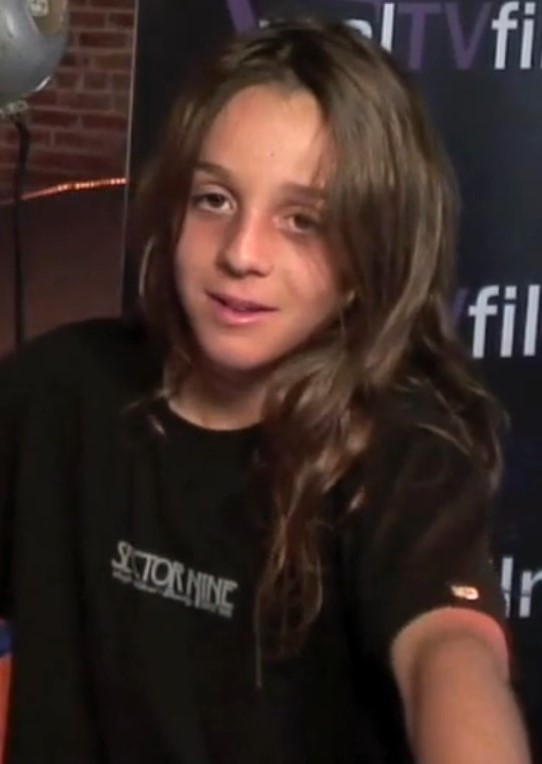
- Juneau in 2011

Personal information
- Full name: Cory Scott Juneau
- Nationality: American
- Born: June 20, 1999 (age 27) San Diego, California, U.S.

Sport
- Sport: Skateboarding
- Team: Flip Skateboards, Golden Goose, Rockstar Energy, Shake Junt, Slappys Garage
Medal record
Men's park skateboarding
Representing the United States
Olympic Games
Bronze medal – third place	2020 Tokyo	Park
World Championships
Bronze medal – third place	2017 Shanghai	Park
X Games
Bronze medal – third place	2017 Minneapolis	Park

Cory Scott Juneau (born June 20, 1999) is an American skateboarder. He has competed in men's park events at several X Games, winning bronze in 2017 and finishing ninth in 2018 and 2019.

He competed in the men's park event at the 2020 Tokyo Olympics, where he won bronze.
