= Pedro Barros =

Brazilian skateboarder (born 1995)

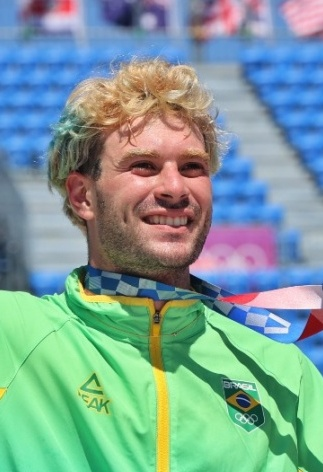
- Barros in 2021

Personal information
- Full name: Pedro Barros
- Born: 15 March 1995 (age 31) Florianópolis, Santa Catarina, Brazil
- Height: 170 (5 ft 7 in)
- Weight: 60.3 kg (133 lb)

Sport
- Country: Brazil
- Sport: Skateboarding
- Rank: 9th
Medal record
Men's park skateboarding
Representing Brazil
Olympic Games
Silver medal – second place	2020 Tokyo	Park
World Championships
Gold medal – first place	2018 Nanjing	Park
Silver medal – second place	2016 Malmö	Park
Silver medal – second place	2017 Shangai	Park
Silver medal – second place	2024 Rome	Park
Bronze medal – third place	2023 Sharjah	Park
Summer X Games
Gold medal – first place	2010 Los Angeles	Park
Gold medal – first place	2012 Los Angeles	Park
Gold medal – first place	2013 Foz do Iguaçu	Park
Gold medal – first place	2013 Barcelona	Park
Gold medal – first place	2014 Austin	Park
Gold medal – first place	2016 Austin	Park
Silver medal – second place	2011 Los Angeles	Park
Silver medal – second place	2013 Munich	Park
Silver medal – second place	2015 Austin	Park
Bronze medal – third place	2024 Ventura	Park

Pedro Barros (born 15 March 1995), known as Pedrinho Barros, is a Brazilian skateboarder who is specialized in Bowl and Park Skateboarding. He won the silver medal in the inaugural Olympic men's park skateboarding event at the 2020 Summer Olympics in Tokyo. Pedro is also an entrepreneur, having his own beer company (LayBack) and his fashion and lifestyle brand, Privê (Privet, in Portuguese).

== Career ==
His skateboarding career started in 2008. In 2008, Barros won the X Games Skateboarding Vert amateur event; in 2009, he ended up in third place in the same event. These two appearances were Pedro's kick-start into a successful X Games career. Furthermore, he got second at the Red-Bull-Crossover in 2009 where he defeated his big idol Sandro Dias for the first time.

In 2010, Barros won X Games gold in Park as a rookie after a battle against Andy Macdonald. Pedro was the first rookie to win skateboard gold since Ryan Sheckler won gold in Park in 2003. He also participated in the X Games Big Air competition the same year and ended up in fourth place. Additionally he won the overall Bowl title of World Cup Skateboarding.

In 2011, Barros landed in second place in the X Games Park event and 14th place in the X Games Vert competition. Again he won the overall Bowl title of World Cup Skateboarding. In 2012, he again won gold in the X Games Park event and won the Vans BOWL-A-RAMA in New York. For the third time in a row he won the overall Bowl title of World Cup Skateboarding.

In 2013, he won two X Games gold medals in Park, one at the X Games in Foz do Iguaçu and the other at the X Games in Barcelona. At the X Games in Munich in 2013, he won the silver medal in Park. For four straight years, he won the overall Bowl title of World Cup Skateboarding. Pedro's winning series continued in 2014, where he got his fifth gold medal in an X Games Park event in Austin, Los Angeles. In the same year he won the Volcom BOWL-A-RAMA in Getxo, Spain and the BOWL-A-RAMA in Wellington, New Zealand. He landed in third in the Bowl ranking of World Cup Skateboarding. In 2015, he won silver at the X Games Park event in Austin. Again he landed in third place in the Bowl ranking of World Cup Skateboarding.

In 2016, he won the X Games Park competition and won his sixth X Games gold medal in total. Until then, he has never finished worse than silver in an astounding Skateboard Park run that began with rookie gold in 2010. In the same year, he also won the Vans Pool Party in California. He won the Vans Park Series in Florianopolis and had two second places at the tour stops in Melbourne and Malmö, which were also the 2016 World Championships in Park Skateboarding.

In 2018, Barros won the Vans Park Series in Vancouver and São Paulo, got third place in Sydney and second place at the tour stop in Malmö, Sweden.

In 2018, his sponsor, Drop Dead Skateboards, released a movie called "Silver Era", featuring a video part by Barros. The same year, he was fourth at Minneapolis's X Games Park event. He won the Vans Park Series event in Vancouver and got three second places at the tour stops in Suzhou, São Paulo and Huntington Beach. He also won the Red Bull Bowl Rippers in Marseilles. In the same year Pedro executed a movie project with Red Bull called "Pedro's Bigger Picture", where he skates artistically designed art features that showcase his favorite skate spots around the world."

Until now, Pedro Barros had nine X Games appearances, taking six gold and three silver medals. He trails only Dave Mirra in first or second-place finishes to start an X Games career in a single discipline (Mirra had ten straight in BMX Vert).

== Business ==
In recent years, Pedro has been working in different areas other than sports, having his own artisan beer company, LayBack, and his fashion brand Privê, which debuted on his 27th birthday.
