= 2024 Olympic Qualifier Series =

Sporting event in Shanghai and Budapest

- Official logo
- Location: (China) Shanghai (16-19 May 2024) (Hungary) Budapest (20-23 June 2024)
- Website: https://olympics.com/en/olympic-qualifier-series/

The 2024 Olympic Qualifier Series was a sporting event held in May and June 2024 in Shanghai and Budapest, respectively. This two-part series was the inaugural edition of a multi-sport Olympic qualifying event, which determined the athletes who will compete in the 2024 Summer Olympics in BMX freestyle, breaking, skateboarding, and sport climbing.

== Background ==
In April 2022, International Olympic Committee announced the plans for a four-sport, festival-style qualification event for what it described as "urban sports"—BMX freestyle, breaking, skateboarding, and sport climbing—in city-centre venues. The series was a part of the organisation's efforts to promote the Olympic qualifying process outlined in its Olympic Agenda 2020+ project, which cited the success of urban sports at the 2020 Summer Olympics in Tokyo. The inaugural edition would take place between March and June 2024.

The IOC announced the two host cities, Shanghai and Budapest, in October 2023. Shanghai was to be the first stop of the series, with events held at the Huangpu Riverside from 16 to 19 May 2024, while the Budapest stage would be held from 20 to 23 June at the Ludovika Campus of the National University of Public Service. Budapest previously hosted the inaugural World Urban Games in 2019.

The final day of the series, 23 June, coincided with the annual Olympic Day, and marked the end of the qualifying process for the 2024 games.

== Qualification format ==
The competition overseen by the respective international governing bodies of the four individual sports: the World DanceSport Federation (WDSF), the International Cycling Union, World Skate, and the International Federation of Sport Climbing (IFSC).

A total of 464 athletes from four sports competed for just over 150 places in the 2024 Olympic Games, with an equal number of places for men and women. Athletes in BMX freestyle, sport climbing, and breaking earned up to 50 points each in Shanghai and Budapest, for a maximum of 100 points total. In skateboarding, a third of the points were awarded from past events, and the remaining two-thirds were earned in Shanghai and Budapest. The athletes with the most points qualified for places in Paris.

Sport		Competing athletes		Qualification spots		Point system
Sport		Male	Female	Male	Female	Point system
BMX freestyle		24	24	6	6	Max 100 points 50 points from Shanghai; 50 points from Budapest
Breaking		40	40	10	10	Max 100 points 50 points from Shanghai; 50 points from Budapest
Skateboarding	Park	44	44	22	22	1/3 from world rankings 1/3 from Shanghai; 1/3 from Budapest
Skateboarding	Street	44	44	22	22	1/3 from world rankings 1/3 from Shanghai; 1/3 from Budapest
Sport climbing	Boulder & lead	48	48	12	12	Max 100 points 50 points from Shanghai; 50 points from Budapest
Sport climbing	Speed	32	32	7	7	Max 100 points 50 points from Shanghai; 50 points from Budapest
Total		232	232	79	79	
Total		464		158		

== Competitors ==
=== Breaking ===
The following athletes have qualified for the Olympic Qualifier Series:

: Athlete has qualified for the 2024 Summer Olympics
: Athlete in quota position but exceeds NOC limit.

B-Boys

10 quotas available - 2 quotas per NOC limit

B-Boys	NOC	Results		Total Points	Qualif.
B-Boys	NOC	Shanghai (#1)	Budapest (#2)	Total Points	Qualif.
B-Boy Lee	Netherlands	50	50	100	Q
B-Boy Lithe-ing	China	45	30	75	Q
B-Boy Hiro10	Japan	41	35	76	Q
B-Boy Hongten	South Korea	38	41	79	Q
B-Boy Jeffro	United States	36	36	72	Q
B-Boy Gravity	United States	35	33	68	
B-Boy Quake	Chinese Taipei	34	26	60	Q
B-Boy Issin	Japan	33	38	71	
B-Boy Menno	Netherlands	32	34	66	Q
B-Boy Lagaet	France	31	25	56	Q
B-Boy Wing	South Korea	30	23	53	
B-Boy Alvin	Colombia	29	22	51	
B-Boy Lussy Sky	Ukraine	28	31	59	
B-Boy Kuzya	Ukraine	27	32	59	Q
B-Boy Amir	Kazakhstan	26	48	74	Q
B-Boy Sunni	Great Britain	25	27	52	
B-Boy X-Rain	China	24	28	52	
B-Boy Lil Zoo	Austria	23	20	43	
B-Boy Khalil	France	22	17	39	
B-Boy JwFresh	China	21	7	28	
B-Boy Wigor	Poland	20	19	39	
B-Boy XAK	Spain	19	21	40	
B-Boy Tirock	Belgium	18	8	26	
B-Boy Lil G	Venezuela	-	18	18	
B-Boy Matita	Chile	17	24	41	
B-Boy Kid Karam	Great Britain	16	14	30	
B-Boy El Nino	United States	-	16	16	
B-Boy Sheku	Great Britain	15	11	26	
B-Boy Mighty Jimm	Belgium	14	13	27	
B-Boy CIS	Belgium	13	29	42	
B-Boy Daniel	Norway	12	15	27	
B-Boy Kill	South Korea	11	12	23	
B-Boy Neosan	France	10	-	10	
B-Boy Leony	Brazil	9	10	19	
B-Boy Lorenzo	Netherlands	-	9	9	
B-Boy Tawfiq	Morocco	8	-	8	
B-Boy Mighty Duck	Australia	7	3	10	
B-Boy Chakib	Algeria	6	6	12	
B-Boy Benmx	Australia	5	2	7	
B-Boy Kid Tek	Australia	4	4	8	
B-Boy Noris	Hungary	3	5	8	
B-Boy Edison	El Salvador	2	1	3	
B-Boy Peter Giwi Kal	Papua New Guinea	1	-	1	

B-Girls

10 quotas available - 2 quotas per NOC limit

B-Girls	NOC	Results		Total Points	Qualif.
B-Girls	NOC	Shanghai (#1)	Budapest (#2)	Total Points	Qualif.
B-Girl Ayumi	Japan	50	45	95	Q
B-Girl Ami	Japan	45	50	95	Q
B-Girl Riko	Japan	41	41	82	
B-Girl Logistx	United States	38	36	74	Q
B-Girl Syssy	France	36	38	74	Q
B-Girl Ying Zi	China	35	34	69	Q
B-Girl Vanessa	Portugal	34	30	64	Q
B-Girl Anti	Italy	33	33	66	Q
B-Girl Stefani	Ukraine	32	31	63	Q
B-Girl Kate	Ukraine	31	35	66	Q
B-Girl Luma	Colombia	30	20	50	
B-Girl Ziyan	China	29	17	46	
B-Girl Alessandrina	Italy	28	18	46	
B-Girl Senorita Carlota	France	27	15	42	Q
B-Girl Paulina	Poland	26	12	38	
B-Girl Emma	Canada	25	21	46	
B-Girl Spidergirl	Italy	24	26	50	
B-Girl Fresh Bella	South Korea	23	27	50	
B-Girl Jilou	Germany	22	25	47	
B-Girl Isis	Ecuador	21	10	31	
B-Girl Camine	Belgium	20	29	49	
B-Girl Madmax	Belgium	19	19	38	
B-Girl Tiff	Canada	18	11	29	
B-Girl Swami	Mexico	17	23	40	
B-Girl Pauline	Germany	16	22	38	
B-Girl Nadia	Israel	15	16	31	
B-Girl Sarah Bee	France	14	14	28	
B-Girl La Vix	United States	13	28	41	
B-Girl Mini Japa	Brazil	-	13	13	
B-Girl Raw Law	Spain	12	-	12	
B-Girl Starry	South Korea	11	32	43	
B-Girl Killa Kim	Ukraine	10	24	34	
B-Girl Furia	Spain	9	5	14	
B-Girl Courtnae Paul	South Africa	8	9	17	
B-Girl Fairytale	Sweden	-	8	8	
B-Girl Csenge	Hungary	7	7	14	
B-Girl Holy Molly	Australia	6	4	10	
B-Girl Hannah	Australia	5	3	8	
B-Girl Midian Leah	South Africa	4	-	4	
B-Girl G-Clef	Australia	3	1	4	
B-Girl Alma	Morocco	2	6	8	
B-Girl Mids	South Africa	-	2	2	
B-Girl Jeanny	Togo	1	-	1	

=== BMX freestyle ===
The following athletes took part in the BMX Freestyle competitions in the Olympic Qualifier Series: The six highest ranked athletes, respecting a limit of 2 per NOC, were given a named quota place at the Games.

: Athlete has qualified for the 2024 Summer Olympics
: Athlete in quota position but exceeds NOC limit.

Men

6 quotas available through OQS.

Men	NOC	Results		Total Points	Qualif.
Men	NOC	Shanghai (#1)	Budapest (#2)	Total Points	Qualif.
Anthony Jeanjean	France	50	50	100	Q
Kieran Reilly	Great Britain	41	41	82	Q
Marcus Christopher	United States	30	45	75	Q
Justin Dowell	United States	35	36	71	Q
Marin Ranteš	Croatia	36	35	71	Q
Gustavo Oliveira	Brazil	33	38	71	Q
Jude Jones	Great Britain	38	31	69	
Logan Martin	Australia	45	24	69	
Nakamura Rim	Japan	32	33	65	
Dylan Hessey	Great Britain	29	32	61	
Daniel Dhers	Venezuela	31	28	59	
José Torres	Argentina	24	34	58	
Ernests Zebolds	Latvia	28	29	57	
Mizogaki Joji	Japan	26	27	53	
Nick Bruce	United States	34	18	52	
Zoltan Kempf	Hungary	20	30	50	
Caio Sousa	Brazil	25	22	47	
Jaie Toohey	Australia	27	20	47	
Alec Danelutti	Australia	22	25	47	
Paul Thölen	Germany	17	26	43	
Kenneth Tencio	Costa Rica	19	23	42	
Hai Yang	China	21	21	42	
Kevin Fabregue	France	23	17	40	
Vincent Leygonie	South Africa	18	19	37	

Women

6 quotas available

Women	NOC	Results		Total Points	Qualif.
Women	NOC	Shanghai (#1)	Budapest (#2)	Total Points	Qualif.
Hannah Roberts	United States	38	50	88	Q
Sun Jiaqi	China	45	41	86	Q
Perris Benegas	United States	36	45	81	Q
Deng Yawen	China	41	38	79	Q
Sun Sibei	China	50	27	77	
Nikita Ducarroz	Switzerland	34	35	69	Q
Natalya Diehm	Australia	32	36	68	Q
Queen Saray Villegas	Colombia	33	32	65	
Lara Marie Lessmann	Germany	28	34	62	
Charlotte Worthington	Great Britain	29	31	60	
Laury Perez	France	27	33	60	
Macarena Perez Grasset	Chile	31	29	60	
Kim Lea Muller	Germany	26	30	56	
Sasha Pardoe	Great Britain	30	25	55	
Sarah Nicki	Australia	24	28	52	
Lillyana Seidler	Germany	23	26	49	
Naito Nene	Japan	25	22	47	
Teresa Fernández-Miranda	Spain	22	23	45	
Eduarda Bordignon	Brazil	20	21	41	
Iveta Miculyčová	Czech Republic	35	–	35	
Analía Zacarías	Argentina	–	24	24	
Katherine Díaz	Venezuela	21	–	21	
Michelle Neuner	Switzerland	19	–	19	
Angie Marino	United States	18	–	18	

=== Sport climbing ===
==== Speed ====
The following athletes took part in the sports Climbing - speed events at the Olympic Qualifier Series:

: Athlete has qualified for the 2024 Summer Olympics
: Athlete in quota position but exceeds NOC limit.

Men

7 quotas available

Men	NOC	Results		Total points	Qualif.
Men	NOC	Shanghai (#1)	Budapest (#2)	Total points	Qualif.
Wu Peng	China	45	50	95	Q
Veddriq Leonardo	Indonesia	50	41	91	Q
Amir Maimuratov	Kazakhstan	30	45	75	Q
Kiromal Katibin	Indonesia	36	36	72	
Aspar Aspar	Indonesia	33	38	71	
Zach Hammer	United States	34	34	68	Q
Reza Alipour	Iran	35	28	63	Q
Yaroslav Tkach	Ukraine	38	25	63	Q
Wang Xinshang	China	41	22	63	
Zhang Liang	China	28	32	60	
Shin Eun-cheol	South Korea	29	30	59	Q
Long Jianguo	China	32	26	58	
Hryhorii Ilchyshyn	Ukraine	25	31	56	
Ludovico Fossali	Italy	21	33	54	
Erik Noya Cardona	Spain	26	27	53	
Ryo Omasa	Japan	27	24	51	
Rishat Khaibullin	Kazakhstan	9	35	44	
Sebastian Lucke	Germany	20	23	43	
Guillaume Moro	France	24	18	42	
Jun Yasukawa	Japan	12	29	41	
Raharjati Nursamsa	Indonesia	31	10	41	
Gian Luca Zodda	Italy	22	17	39	
Pierre Rebreyend	France	17	19	36	
Noah Bratschi	United States	14	21	35	
Jung Yong-jun	South Korea	15	20	35	
Carolos Granja	Ecuador	23	12	35	
Leander Carmanns	Germany	19	15	34	
Marcin Dzieński	Poland	16	14	30	
Alessandro Boulos	Italy	13	16	29	
Isaac Estevez	Ecuador	18	11	29	
John Brosler	United States	10	13	23	
Hayden Barton	Australia	11	9	20	

A limit of 2 quotas per NOC applies. No NOC already have two full quotas. As Indonesia, Italy, China, New Zealand, United States, France and South Africa already have one quota, they can claim only one quota via the Series.

Women

7 quotas available

Women	NOC	Results		Total Points	Qualif.
Women	NOC	Shanghai (#1)	Budapest (#2)	Total Points	Qualif.
Zhou Yafei	China	50	45	95	Q
Aleksandra Kałucka	Poland	36	50	86	Q
Rajiah Sallsabillah	Indonesia	45	41	86	Q
Niu Di	China	38	38	76	
Natalia Kałucka	Poland	41	32	73	
Narda Mutia Amanda	Indonesia	33	35	68	
Capucine Viglione	France	34	34	68	Q
Zhang Shaoqin	China	31	36	67	
Wang Shengyan	China	32	28	60	
Manon Lebon	France	26	33	59	Q
Nurul Iqamah	Indonesia	28	31	59	
Leslie Romero	Spain	29	30	59	Q
Beatrice Colli	Italy	30	27	57	Q
Lison Gautron	France	27	29	56	
Jeong Ji-min	South Korea	35	19	54	
Carla Martinéz Vidal	Spain	23	24	47	
Franziska Ritter	Germany	24	23	47	
Giulia Randi	Italy	25	21	46	
Tamara Ulzhabayeva	Kazakhstan	19	25	44	
Andrea Rojas	Ecuador	22	22	44	
Karin Hayashi	Japan	17	20	37	
Anna Brożek	Poland	20	17	37	
Patrycja Chudziak	Poland	9	26	35	
Ai Takeuchi	Japan	15	18	33	
Victoire Andrier	France	18	15	33	
Sung Han-areum	South Korea	16	16	32	
Fumika Kawakami	Japan	13	13	26	
Natsumi Hayashi	Japan	12	12	24	
Noh Hee-ju	South Korea	14	10	24	
Grace Crowley	Australia	11	11	22	
Mahya Darabian	Iran	21	–	21	
Tegwen Oates	South Africa	10	9	19	
Valeria Macias Ferreira	Mexico	–	14	14	

A limit of 2 quotas per NOC applies. As the United States already have two full quotas; they do not take part in this event. As Indonesia, Poland, China, New Zealand and South Africa already have one quota, they can claim only one quota via the Series.

==== Boulder & lead ====
Men

12 quotas available

Athlete	NOC	Results		Total points	Qualif.
Athlete	NOC	Shanghai (#1)	Budapest (#2)	Total points	Qualif.
Lee Dohyun	South Korea	50	45	95	Q
Alberto Ginés López	Spain	45	36	81	Q
Adam Ondra	Czech Republic	41	41	82	Q
Paul Jenft	France	38	32	70	Q
Sascha Lehmann	Switzerland	36	28	64	Q
Hannes van Duysen	Belgium	35	38	73	Q
Hamish McArthur	Great Britain	34	31	65	Q
Sam Avezou	France	33	50	83	Q
Yannick Flohé	Germany	32	33	65	Q
Mejdi Schalck	France	31	35	66	
Nicolas Collin	Belgium	30	21	51	
Alexander Megos	Germany	29	34	63	Q
Yufei Pan	China	28	24	52	Q
Anze Peharc	Slovenia	27	13	40	
Luka Potočar	Slovenia	26	29	55	Q
Nicolai Uznik	Austria	25	16	41	
Filip Schenk	Italy	24	23	47	
Stefan Scherz	Austria	23	7	30	
Stefano Ghisolfi	Italy	22	11	33	
Hannes Puman	Sweden	21	9	29	
Yannick Nagel	Germany	20	22	42	
Jong-won Chon	South Korea	19	25	44	
Jonas Utelli	Switzerland	18	17	35	
Nimrod Marcus	Israel	17	30	47	
Simon Lorenzi	Belgium	16	26	42	
Nikolay Rusev	Bulgaria	15	4	19	
Yuval Shemla	Israel	14	6	20	
Jack MacDougall	Great Britain	13	9	22	
Ravianto Ramadhan	Indonesia	12	12	24	
Zan Lovenjak Sudar	Slovenia	11	1	12	
Yunchan Song	South Korea	10	27	37	
Sean McColl	Canada	9	3	12	
Martin Stráník	Czech Republic	8	14	22	
Raviandi Ramadhan	Indonesia	7	10	17	
Martin Bergant	Slovenia	6	18	24	
Marcello Bombardi	Italy	5	2	7	
Oscar Baudrand	Canada	4	20	24	
Maximilian Milne	Great Britain	3	19	22	
Edvards Gruzitis	Latvia	2	1	3	
Mickael Mawem	France	1	0	1	
James Pope	Great Britain	1	1	2	
Giorgio Tomatis	Italy	1	5	6	
Alex Khazanov	Israel	1	15	16	
Geva Levin	Israel	1	1	2	
Dylan Parks	Australia	1	1	2	
Niród Sebestyén Tusnády	Hungary	1	1	2	
Benjamin Vargas	Chile	0	1	1	

A limit of 2 quotas per NOC applies. As the United States and Japan already have two full quotas; they do not take part in this event. As Australia, Austria, Great Britain and South Africa already have one quota, they can claim only one quota via the Series. Pending qualification for France will be solved during final on the 23rd of June among the 3 competitors for only two quotas.

Women

12 quotas available

Athlete	NOC	Results		Total points	Qualif.
Athlete	NOC	Shanghai (#1)	Budapest (#2)	Total points	Qualif.
Brooke Raboutou	United States	50	50	100	Q
Miho Nonaka	Japan	38	45	83	Q
Erin McNeice	Great Britain	41	41	82	Q
Chae-hyun Seo	South Korea	45	36	81	Q
Luo Zhilu	China	34	38	72	Q
Ievgeniia Kazbekova	Ukraine	35	33	68	Q
Futaba Ito	Japan	36	31	67	
Mia Krampl	Slovenia	29	34	63	Q
Lucia Dörffel	Germany	31	32	63	Q
Zélia Avezou	France	33	29	62	Q
Camilla Moroni	Italy	32	28	60	Q
Laura Rogora	Italy	24	35	59	Q
Molly Thompson-Smith	Great Britain	28	30	58	Q
Jain Kim	South Korea	30	26	56	
Anastasia Sanders	United States	27	27	54	
Manon Hily	France	26	24	50	
Franziska Sterrer	Austria	25	2	27	
Lucija Tarkus	Slovenia	23	22	45	
Fanny Gibert	France	22	3	25	
Ryu Nakagawa	Japan	21	1	22	
Hélène Janicot	France	20	21	41	
Michaela Smetanová	Czech Republic	19	9	28	
Staša Gejo	Serbia	18	19	37	
Vita Lukan	Slovenia	17	23	40	
Chloe Caulier	Belgium	16	12	28	
Yejoo Seo	South Korea	15	8	23	
Hannah Meul	Germany	14	18	32	
Maya Stasiuk	Australia	13	1	14	
Petra Klingler	Switzerland	12	20	32	
Elnaz Rekabi	Iran	11	11	22	
Kylie Cullen	United States	10	10	20	
Giorgia Tesio	Italy	9	4	13	
Sara Copar	Slovenia	8	16	24	
Sol Sa	South Korea	7	14	21	
Martina Buršíková	Slovakia	6	6	12	
Ayala Kerem	Israel	5	25	30	
Kyra Condie	United States	4	15	19	
Valentina Maria Aguado	Argentina	3	1	4	
Sandra Hopfensitz	Germany	2	1	3	
Nonoha Kume	Japan	1	0	1	
Eliška Adamovská	Czech Republic	1	1	2	
Lynn van der Meer	Netherlands	1	0	1	
Noa Shiran	Israel	1	7	8	
Roxana Wienand	Germany	1	13	14	
Aleksandra Totkova	Bulgaria	1	5	6	
Alannah Yip	Canada	1	17	18	
Tegwen Oates	South Africa	1	1	2	
Svana Bjarnason	Iceland	1	1	2	

A limit of 2 quotas per NOC applies. No NOC enters the Series with two full quotas. As Australia, Austria, China, France, Japan, Slovenia, South Africa and the United States already have one quota, they can claim only one quota via the Series.

=== Skateboarding ===
Unlike the other sports, existing world rankings formed part of the scoring system for this event, and this event was the main qualification event for the sport. As such, the scoring system did not resemble the other three sports. Instead, the points awarded at each of the two Series event represents one third of the possible total, which together with the existing world ranking points, make up the final Olympic World Rankings from which the top 20 skateboarders in each event are selected (respecting the 3 athlete per NOC rule).

The following athletes have qualified for the Olympic Qualifier Series:

==== Skateboarding Park ====
: Athlete has qualified for the 2024 Summer Olympics.
: Athlete exceeds NOC quota.
: NOC guaranteed quota, but not athlete.

Men

20 quotas available, 3 per NOC limit.

Men	NOC	Results			Total points	Qualif.
Men	NOC	WR	Shanghai (#1)	Budapest (#2)	Total points	Qualif.
Gavin Bottger	United States	144,565	91,382	115,940	351,887	Q
Jagger Eaton	United States	135,606	142,800	25,721	307,127	
Augusto Akio	Brazil	120,916	81,200	102,901	305,017	Q
Tate Carew	United States	118,851	210,000	142,800	471,351	Q
Luigi Cini	Brazil	116,484	72,192	40,716	228,852	Q
Pedro Barros	Brazil	98,371	102,901	10,179	211,451	Q
Tom Schaar	United States	92,656	57,755	168,000	318411	Q
Kieran Woolley	Australia	76,972	115,940	91,382	284294	Q
Danny Leon	Spain	70,342	32,331	57,755	160,428	Q
Steven Piñeiro	Puerto Rico	66,566	15,514	3,236	85,316	Q
Keegan Palmer	Australia	62,553	168,000	210,000	440553	Q
Liam Pace	United States	53,082	3,236	3,046	59,364	
Nagahara Yuro	Japan	52,242	28,832	3,091	84,165	Q
Hampus Winberg	Sweden	46,664	21,282	45,726	113,672	Q
Keefer Wilson	Australia	44,685	40,716	32,331	117,732	Q
Viktor Solmunde	Denmark	42,067	19,153	81,200	142420	Q
Pedro Quintas	Brazil	37,635	36,274	3,437	77,346	
Alessandro Mazzara	Italy	33,878	12,567	21,282	67,727	Q
Alex Sorgente	Italy	30,010	51,374	36,274	117,658	Q
Pedro Carvalho	Brazil	26,451	25,721	19,153	71,325	
Ash Wilcomes	Australia	21,483	3,543	3,543	28,569	
Taylor Nye	United States	20,924	3,139	7,420	31,483	
Vincent Matheron	France	15,160	5,993	72,192	93345	Q
Elias Nilsen	Norway	13,320	7,420	8,245	28,985	
Tyler Edtmayer	Germany	12,572	17,238	5,692	35,502	Q
Murilo Peres	Brazil	10,916	13,963	15,514	40,393	
Rune Glifberg	Denmark	10,803	3,385	3,385	17,573	
Tommy Calvert	Great Britain	8,439	3,188	5,993	17,620	
Peio Gonzalez	Spain	8,264	11,309	11,309	30,882	
Noe Montagard	France	7,625	3,284	3,596	14,505	
Thomas Augusto	Portugal	6,445	8,245	51,374	66,064	Q
Kiko Francisco	Philippines	6,439	5,138	9,162	20,739	
Egoitz Bijueska	Spain	5,984	3,596	4,508	14,088	
Yam Behar	Israel	5,962	10,179	3,284	19,425	
Edouard Damestoy	France	4,746	9,162	17,238	31,146	
Ethan Copeland	Australia	4,471	3,046	3,139	10,656	
Omar Cocilova	Argentina	3,318	3,437	3,334	10,089	
George O'Neill	Great Britain	3,301	3,334	3,490	10,125	
Alain Kortabitarte	Spain	3,125	45,726	13,963	62,814	Q
Andrew Macdonald	Great Britain	3,056	5,692	28,832	37,850	Q
Tom Martin	France	3,042	6,307	12,567	21,916	
Phoenix Sinnerton	Australia	2,958	3,490	5,138	11,586	
Chen Ye	China	2,048	4,508	6,307	13,763	
Dallas Oberholzer	South Africa	524	3,091	3,188	6,803	Q

Women

21 quotas available, 3 per NOC limit.

Women	NOC	Results			Total Points	Qualif.
Women	NOC	WR	Shanghai (#1)	Budapest (#2)	Total Points	Qualif.
Kokona Hiraki	Japan	184000	168000	142800	494800	Q
Arisa Trew	Australia	61635	210000	210000	481635	Q
Sakura Yosozumi	Japan	103833	142800	57755	304388	Q
Sky Brown	Great Britain	130000	-	168000	298000	Q
Hinano Kusaki	Japan	136420	57755	102901	297076	Q
Mizuho Hasegawa	Japan	35251	102901	115940	254092	
Bryce Wettstein	United States	79759	81200	81374	242333	Q
Raicca Ventura	Brazil	96023	51374	91382	238779	Q
Ruby Trew	Australia	85123	72192	28832	186147	Q
Dora Varella	Brazil	45880	91382	32331	169593	Q
Ruby Lilley	United States	51271	45726	72192	169189	Q
Isadora Pacheco	Brazil	23446	115940	21282	160668	Q
Minna Stess	United States	96384	25721	36274	158379	Q
Grace Marhoefer	United States	40918	40716	40716	122350	
Naia Laso	Spain	104155	3139	3091	110385	Q
Heili Sirvio	Finland	12610	11309	81200	105119	Q
Lilly Stoephasius	Germany	66989	9162	8245	84396	Q
Jordyn Barratt	United States	34370	32331	17238	83939	
Sugawara Mei	Japan	18924	19153	45726	83803	
Yndiara Asp	Brazil	36481	17238	25721	79440	
Nana Taboulet	France	9385	36274	15514	61173	Q
Lola Tambling	Great Britain	46261	-	10179	56440	Q
Fay Ebert	Canada	12228	28832	11309	52369	Q
Emilie Alexandre	France	13788	21282	3490	38560	Q
Julia Benedetti	Spain	11780	7420	19153	38353	Q
Zheng Haohao	China	5656	15514	13963	35133	Q
Lillian Erickson	United States	25875	3490	3334	32699	
Nakamura Kisa	Japan	15909	12567	3139	31615	
Lilly Strachan	Great Britain	7192	13963	7420	28575	
Poppy Starr	Australia	10950	8245	9162	28357	
Cho Hyunju	South Korea	16162	3385	5692	25239	
Aaliyah Wilson	Australia	6588	10179	6307	23074	
Fernanda Tonissi	Brazil	4066	5993	12567	22626	
Charlotte Heath	Australia	10803	5138	5138	21079	
Gadea Moja	Spain	7721	5408	3385	16514	
Ceci Rendueles	Spain	3926	6307	5406	15639	
Li Yujuan	China	6176	3284	5993	15453	
Madeleine Larcheron	France	4196	5690	3596	13482	
Coco Crafter	Australia	6430	3543	3284	13257	
Hedda Hjertberg	Sweden	5932	3596	3437	12965	
Lucrezia Zarattini	Italy	4345	3236	3188	10769	
Alisa Fessi	Austria	3310	3437	3543	10290	
Victoria Bassi	Brazil	4530	-	-	4530	
Aya Asaqas	Morocco	681	3188	-	3869	Q

==== Skateboarding Street ====
: Athlete has qualified for the 2024 Summer Olympics.
: Athlete exceeds NOC quota.
: NOC guaranteed quota, but not athlete.

Men

20 quotas available

Men	NOC	Results			Total Points	Qualif.
Men	NOC	WR	Shanghai (#1)	Budapest (#2)	Total Points	Qualif.
Shirai Sora	Japan	182,553	42,574	176,800	401,927	Q
Nyjah Huston	United States	181,726	127,466	6,756	315,948	Q
Gustavo Ribeiro	Portugal	166,900	112,262	12,748	291,910	Q
Aurelien Giraud	France	150,172	—	69,824	219,996	Q
Kairi Netsuke	Japan	147,835	87,278	98,948	334,061	
Onodera Ginwoo	Japan	125,963	208,000	208,000	541,963	Q
Horigome Yuto	Japan	106,120	23,990	260,000	390,110	Q
Richard Tury	Slovakia	102,039	19,432	144,840	266,311	Q
Kelvin Hoefler	Brazil	86,873	6,096	87,278	180,247	Q
Toa Sasaki	Japan	79,687	144,840	37,686	262,213	
Cordano Russell	Canada	69,092	12,748	61,632	143,472	Q
Jagger Eaton	United States	67,579	260,000	29,590	357,169	Q
Vincent Milou	France	62,701	—	8,364	71,065	Q
Ryan Decenzo	Canada	60,369	29,590	6,096	96,055	Q
Aoki Yukito	Japan	60,030	37,686	14,166	111,882	
Alex Midler	United States	55,653	11,474	3,648	70,775	
Giovanni Vianna	Brazil	51,014	98,948	11,474	161,436	Q
Chris Joslin	United States	47,099	176,800	42,574	266,473	Q
Matías Dell Olio	Argentina	40,561	61,632	127,466	229,659	Q
Braden Hoban	United States	39,046	69,824	112,262	221,132	
Mauro Iglesia	Argentina	38,112	7,110	3,994	49,216	Q
Felipe Gustavo	Brazil	32,944	33.384	17,488	83,816	Q
Gabryel Aguilar	Brazil	27,926	10,328	3,702	41,956	
Matt Berger	Canada	25,752	54,446	29,590	109,788	Q
Jhancarlos González	Colombia	25,391	14,166	15,740	55,297	Q
Deivid Tuesta	Peru	24,839	3,934	3,484	32,257	
Micky Papa	Canada	22,615	6,756	33,384	62,755	
Joseph Garbaccio	France	20,019	48,128	19,432	87,579	Q
Shane O'Neill	Australia	19,986	3,648	3,538	27,172	Q
Ángelo Caro	Peru	16,404	17,488	3,934	37,826	
Jake Ilardi	United States	13,796	21,590	48,128	83,514	
Rome Collyer	Australia	13,472	3,874	3,874	21,220	
Greg Rodriguez	Mexico	13,245	3,702	7,110	24,057	
Kristoffer Kroon	Sweden	11,446	9,294	3,816	24,556	
Justin Sommer	Germany	10,865	3,538	3,594	17,997	
Lucas Rabelo	Brazil	10,741	3,816	-	14,557	
Joe Hinson	Great Britain	10,094	8,364	10,328	28,786	
Tommy Fynn	Australia	8,055	3,594	5,792	17,441	
Filipe Mota	Brazil	7,422	15,740	54,446	77,608	
Agustin Aquila	Italy	5,982	5,792	6,416	18,190	
Kilian Zehnder	Switzerland	5,555	6,416	21,590	33,561	
Gabriel Ribeiro	Portugal	4,533	4,054	3,758	12,345	
Brandon Valjalo	South Africa	2,181	3,994	4,054	10,229	Q
Zhang Jie	China	2,166	3,758	9,294	15,218	

Women

20 quotas available

Women	NOC	Results			Total Points	Qualif.
Women	NOC	WR	Shanghai (#1)	Budapest (#2)	Total Points	Qualif.
Coco Yoshizawa	Japan	122,948	176,800	260,000	559,748	Q
Liz Akama	Japan	178,771	208,000	144,840	531,611	Q
Rayssa Leal	Brazil	197,465	260,000	—	457,465	Q
Funa Nakayama	Japan	141,774	112,262	176,800	430,836	Q
Yumeka Oda	Japan	188,000	21,590	208,000	417,590	
Chloe Covell	Australia	187,520	87,278	127,466	402,264	Q
Momiji Nishiya	Japan	198,800	69,824	33,384	302,008	
Cui Chenxi	China	51,493	127,466	98,948	277,907	Q
Miyu Ito	Japan	79,385	61,632	112,262	253,279	
Paige Heyn	United States	77,076	54,446	87,278	218,800	Q
Poe Pinson	United States	15,499	144,840	54,446	214,785	Q
Zeng Wenhui	China	27,260	98,948	42,574	168,782	Q
Zhu Yuanling	China	7,983	42,574	69,824	120,381	Q
Roos Zwetsloot	Netherlands	58,639	11,474	37,686	107,799	Q
Pâmela Rosa	Brazil	80, 344	9,294	17,488	107,126	Q
Jazmín Álvarez	Colombia	15,959	6,416	61,632	84,007	Q
Natalia Muñoz	Spain	23,789	48,128	10,328	82,245	Q
Liv Lovelace	Australia	33,342	17,488	29,590	80,420	Q
Keet Oldenbeuving	Netherlands	31,497	19,432	23,990	74,919	Q
Gabriela Mazetto	Brazil	59,157	4,054	6,416	69,627	Q
Vareeraya Sukasem	Thailand	5,972	6,756	48,128	60,856	Q
Mariah Duran	United States	21,752	29,590	3,816	55,158	Q
Haylie Powell	Australia	27,914	14,166	9,294	51,374	Q
Daniela Terol	Spain	38,287	3,484	8,364	50,135	
Afrika Criado Oliva	Spain	7,578	37,686	4,054	49,318	
Lucie Schoonheere	France	20,410	23,990	3,874	48,274	Q
Zhang Yan	China	8,045	33,384	3,934	45,363	
Lan Junyi	China	5,900	12,748	21,590	40,238	
Felicity Turner	Australia	12,522	15,740	11,474	39,736	
Lore Bruggeman	Belgium	18,294	3,702	15,740	37,736	
Charlotte Hym	France	13,139	10,328	14,166	37,633	
Jeromine Louvet	France	6,886	3,758	19,432	30,076	
Kemily Suiara	Brazil	8,953	3,434	12,748	25,135	
Ha Siye	South Korea	10,413	7,110	3,994	21,517	
Weronika Choromanska	Poland	5,089	8,364	5,792	19,225	
Jessica Ready	New Zealand	7,839	3,648	7,110	18,597	
Meagan Guy	United States	5,445	6,096	6,756	18,297	
Candy Jacobs	Netherlands	14,081	3,538	—	17,619	
Marina Gabriela	Brazil	5,206	5,792	6,096	17,094	
Isabelly Ávila	Brazil	7,980	3,594	3,758	15,332	
Aldana Bertrán	Argentina	7,178	3,994	3,648	14,820	
Samantha Secours	Canada	6,585	3,816	3,702	14,103	
Ailin Arzua	Argentina	5,486	3,934	3,594	13,014	
Boipelo Awuah	South Africa	2,642	3,874	—	6,516	Q
