= International Fair Play Committee =

Organisation

The official logo of the CIFP

The International Fair Play Committee (French: Comité international pour le Fair-Play), abbreviated as the CIFP or the IFPC, is a not for profit international non-governmental organisation which serves to foster sportsmanship in international competition. It presents awards annually at the World Fair Play Awards to recognise acts of fair play carried out by sportspeople or teams. The awards ceremony is held in various locations and has been broadcast on television in Europe.

== History ==
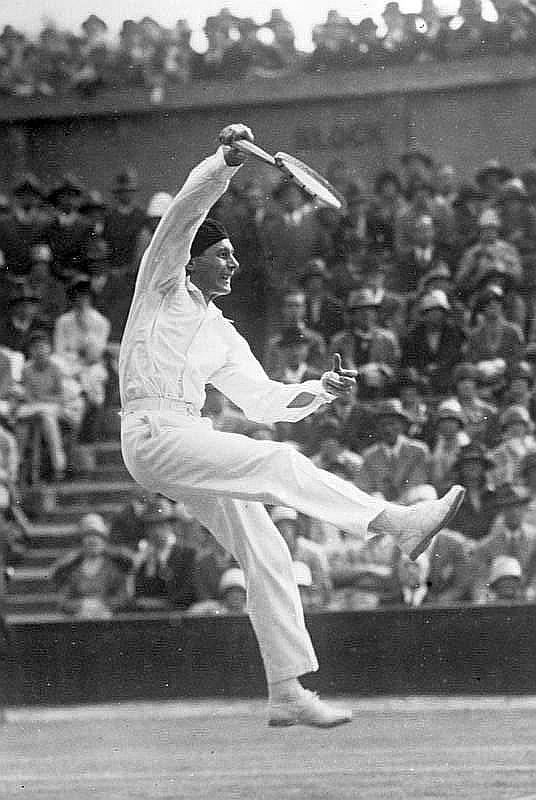
CIFP founder Jean Borotra during his tennis career

The CIFP was established in France in 1963 by members of UNESCO, ISPA, ICSSPE, FIFA, FIBA, FILA and the International Rugby Board. The committee presented its first award two years later: Eugenio Monti, an Italian bobsleigher, was the recipient. The spare part Monti had given to rival Tony Nash at the 1964 Winter Olympics had enabled the Briton to go on to win the gold medal.

== Awards ==
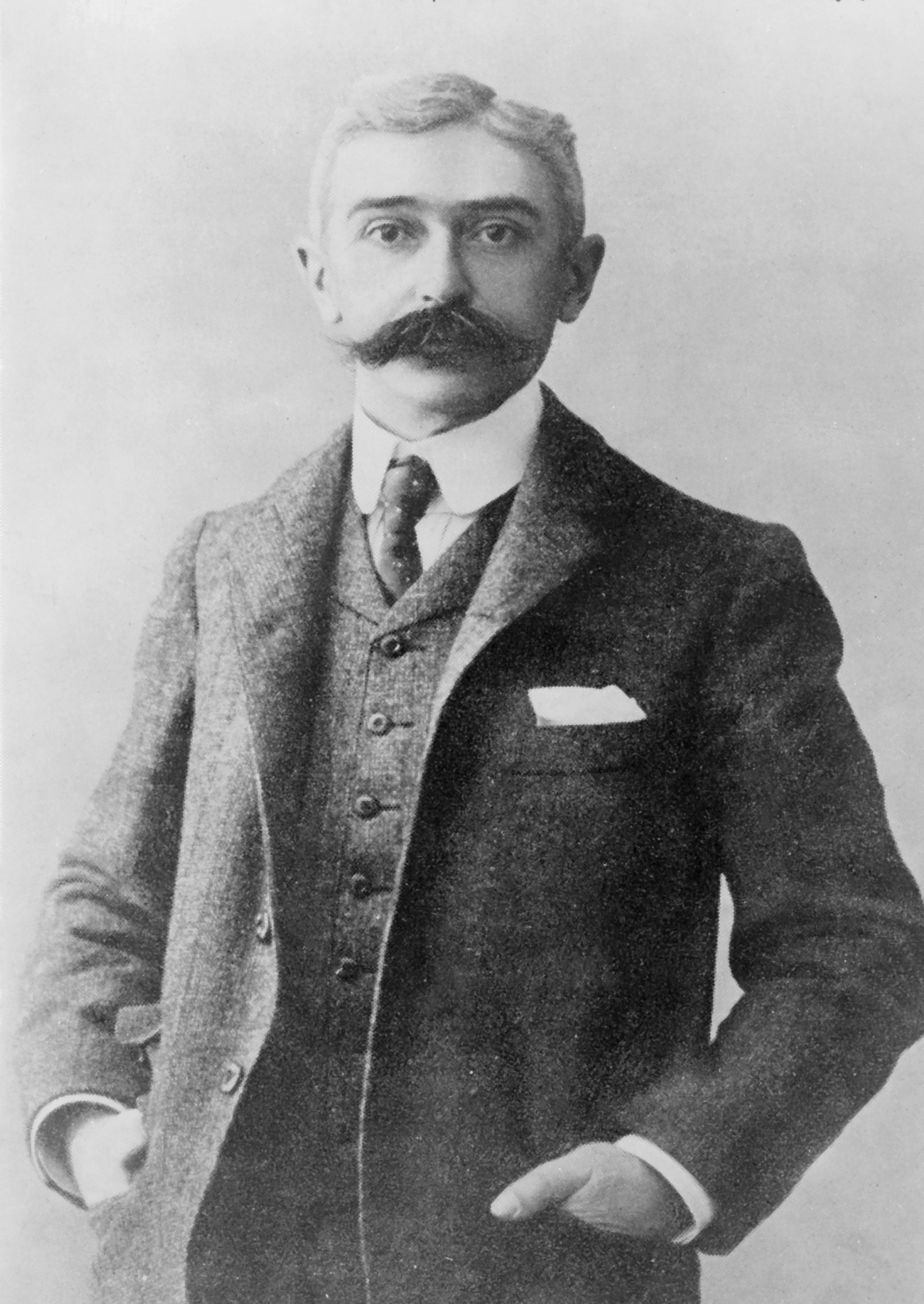
Pierre de Coubertin, founder of the modern Olympics, has a trophy named in his honour.

=== Annual awards ===
Awards are presented at the annual World Fair Play Awards Ceremony in three categories:

- For an act of fair play by complying with both the written and unwritten rules of sport.
- For a general attitude of sportsmanship throughout a sports career by demonstrating an outstanding and constant spirit of fair play.
- For an activity aiming to promote fair play such as the organisation of national or local campaigns, lectures, books, articles or reports in the media.

The trophies given in recognition of the different achievements in each category are:

- Pierre de Coubertin World Fair Play Trophy (Note: Formerly variously referred to as the: International Fair Play Trophy Pierre de Coubertin; International Pierre de Coubertin Fair Play Trophy; Pierre de Coubertin Award for Act of Fair Play; Pierre de Coubertin Fair Play Trophy; Pierre de Coubertin International Fair Play Award; Pierre de Coubertin International Fair Play Trophy; Pierre de Coubertin International Trophy for Fair Play; Pierre de Coubertin Trophy for Fair Play; Pierre de Coubertin World Trophy.) – the "trophy for action", awarded since 1965 for gestures of fair play in which an athlete impedes their performance to aid a fellow competitor.
- Jean Borotra World Fair Play Trophy (Note: Formerly variously referred to as the: Jean Borotra Trophy; Jean Borotra World Trophy.) – the "trophy for the career", awarded since 1973 to recognise athletes who have displayed fair play throughout their careers.
- Willi Daume World Fair Play Trophy (Note: Formerly the Willi Daume World Trophy.) – the "trophy for promotion", awarded since 1995 to a person or organisation that has promoted the spirit of fair play.

Since 2013, the CIFP has, under the auspices of the IOC President, also given out the

- Jacques Rogge World Fair Play Trophy for The Youth (Note: Formerly the Jacques Rogge Fair Play Trophy for The Youth. Also referred to as the Jacques Rogge World Fair Play Award for the Youth. Before 2017 variously referred to as the: Fair Play Award for the Youth; Fair Play Trophy for the Youth or the; Youth Fair Play Award.) – the "trophy for the youth", in recognition of junior athletes committed to the ideal of fair play.

Further to these annual trophies, the CIFP gives out diplomas and, since 1977, letters of congratulations to other sportspeople and organisations who have shown exceptional good sportsmanship.

Since 2014, the CIFP has awarded a Special World Fair Play Trophy "to such public figures that have significantly supported the development of sport – with no personal interest attached." The first recipients of the Special World Fair Play Trophy were Mintimer Shaimiev and Alisher Usmanov.

=== Occasional awards ===
The CIFP will on occasion give out Fair Play Awards. These were first presented at the 2008 Summer Olympics in Beijing. Among the recipients are:

- 2013: Russian middle-distance runner Yuliya Zaripova received the CIFP Fair Play Award for the 2013 Summer Universiade.
- 2016: Norway men's national handball team received the Rio 2016 Fair Play Award for great sportsmanship during their semifinal match against Germany on 29 January at the 2016 European Men's Handball Championship. Nikki Hamblin and Abbey D'Agostino received the Rio 2016 Fair Play Award after colliding with each other on the track during the 5000 m event and assisting each other to continue the race. (Note: Some news media reported on 22 August 2016 that Nikki Hamblin and Abbey D'Agostino had received the Pierre de Coubertin Medal. The New Zealand Olympic Committee said that no such award had yet been made, and The Guardian later corrected their report confirming "the award was the International Fair Play Committee Award rather than the Pierre de Coubertin award".)
- 2017: High jumper Ruth Beitia of Spain received the CIFP Fair Play Award for the 2017 World Championships in Athletics in London.
- 2020: Skateboarders Sakura Yosozumi and Cocona Hiraki of Japan, Brazilians Dora Varella and Yndiara Asp, Britain's Sky Brown, Australian Poppy Olsen and Bryce Wettstein, USA were awarded the Tokyo 2020 Fair Play Award.
- 2021: Charne Eileen Swart and Veronica Vancardo received a CIFP Fair Play Award for the 2021 Summer World University Games.
- 2022: French cyclist Romain Bardet received the CIFP Fair Play Award for the 2022 Giro d'Italia. Andorran runner Nahuel Carabaña received the CIFP Fair Play Award for the 2022 European Championships. Quatari high jumper Mutaz Barsham received the CIFP Fair Play Award for the Tokyo 2020 Summer Olympics.
- 2023: Ethiopian long-distance runner Letesenbet Gidey received the CIFP Fair Play Award as part of the 2023 World Athletics Awards for the 2023 World Athletics Championships. Colombian judoka Erika Lasso received the CIFP Fair Play Award for the 2023 Pan American Games.
- 2024: Canadian gymnast Ellie Black received the Paris 2024 Fair Play Award.
- 2026: American figure skater Ilia Malinin received the Milano-Cortina 2026 Fair Play Award.

=== Trophy recipients ===
Year	Pierre de Coubertin World Fair Play Trophy (Trophy for action)	Jean Borotra World Fair Play Trophy (Trophy for the career)	Willi Daume World Fair Play Trophy (Trophy for promotion)	Jacques Rogge World Fair Play Trophy for The Youth
1964	Eugenio Monti (Italy)	Not awarded	Not awarded	Not awarded
1965	Willye White (United States); West Ham (England) and TSV Munich (West Germany) and István Zsolt (Hungary)	Not awarded	Not awarded	Not awarded
1966	Stevan Horvat (Socialist Federal Republic of Yugoslavia)	Not awarded	Not awarded	Not awarded
1967	István Gulyás (Hungary)	Not awarded	Not awarded	Not awarded
1968	Japan Men's Olympic Football Team	Not awarded	Not awarded	Not awarded
1969	Francisco Buscató (Spain); Pedro Zaballa (Spain)	Not awarded	Not awarded	Not awarded
1970	Ryszard Szurkowski (Poland)	Not awarded	Not awarded	Not awarded
1971	Meta Antenen (Switzerland)	Not awarded	Not awarded	Not awarded
1972	Stan Smith (United States)	Emiliano Rodríguez (Spain)	Not awarded	Not awarded
1973	Great Britain's men's team pursuit-team (United Kingdom) : Michael Bennett; Rik Evans; Ian Hallam; William Moore	Bobby Charlton (England)	Not awarded	Not awarded
1974	Claude Ravonel (Belgium)	Lia Manoliu (Romania)	Not awarded	Not awarded
1975	Victor Niederhoffer (United States)	Bob Mathias (United States); Emil Zátopek (Czech Republic)	Not awarded	Not awarded
1976	André Bastin (Luxembourg)	Jenő Kamuti (Hungary)	Not awarded	Not awarded
1977	Japanese spectators during the 1977 Volleyball World Cup (Men's, Women's) (Japan)	Gustav Kilian (Luxembourg); John Naber (United States)	Not awarded	Not awarded
1978	Tamás Wichmann (Hungary)	Gareth Edwards (United Kingdom)	Not awarded	Not awarded
1979	Philippe Roux (Switzerland)	Sven Thofelt (Sweden)	Not awarded	Not awarded
1980	Stefan Branth and Gert Pettersson (Sweden)	Giacinto Facchetti (Italy); Stanley Rous (United Kingdom)	Not awarded	Not awarded
1981	Not awarded	Mohammed Gammoudi (Tunisia); Klaus Steinbach (West Germany)	Not awarded	Not awarded
1982	Mats Wilander (Sweden)	Not awarded	Not awarded	Not awarded
1983	İsmet Karababa (Turkey)	Aleksandr Medved (Soviet Union)	Not awarded	Not awarded
1984	Mohamed Ali Rashwan (Egypt); Dariusz Zawadzki (Poland)	Not awarded	Not awarded	Not awarded
1985	Mokhtar Mokhtar (Egypt)	René Bazennerye (France) (Note: Awarded posthumously); John B. Kelly Jr. (United States); Juha Mieto (Finland); Balbir Singh Sr. (India)	Not awarded	Not awarded
1986	István Vaskuti and János Sarusi Kis (Hungary)	Stanley Matthews (United Kingdom)	Not awarded	Not awarded
1987	Cleveland Stroud (United States)	Vijay Amritraj (India)	Not awarded	Not awarded
1988	Soviet–Canadian 1988 Polar Bridge Expedition (Soviet Union) / (Canada); Teófilo Stevenson (Cuba)	Not awarded	Not awarded	Not awarded
1989	Jean-Michel Henry (France)	Věra Čáslavská (Czech Republic); Chris Evert (United States); Ken Rosewall (Australia); Pirmin Zurbriggen (Switzerland)	Not awarded	Not awarded
1990	Ivan Lawler and Graham Burns (United Kingdom)	Dino Zoff (Italy)	Not awarded	Not awarded
1991	Racing Club de France (rugby team); Robert Veghelyi (Hungary)	Arthur Ashe (United States)	Not awarded	Not awarded
1992	Eddie Van Hoof (United Kingdom)	Raymond Poulidor (France); Raisa Smetanina	Not awarded	Not awarded
1993	FIFA; The people of Norway at the XVII Olympic Winter Games in Lillehammer	Not awarded	Not awarded	Not awarded
1994	Francesco Panetta (Italy); Justin McDonald (Australia)	Not awarded	Zofia Żukowska (Poland)	Not awarded
1995	Sergey Bubka (Ukraine); Laurent Jalabert (France)	Nelson Mandela (South Africa); Jean-François Lamour (France); Vreni Schneider (Switzerland)	Albert II, Prince of Monaco	Not awarded
1996	Not awarded	Ludvík Daněk (Czech Republic); Stefan Edberg (Sweden)	Erica Terpstra (Netherlands); Mario Vázquez Raña (Mexico)	Not awarded
1997	Not awarded	Not awarded	Ludvík Daněk (Czech Republic); Konishiki Yasokichi (Japan)	Not awarded
1998	Giovanni Soldini (Italy)	Brigitte Deydier (France)	Lithuanian Fair Play Committee and Artūras Poviliūnas (Lithuania)	Not awarded
1999	Not awarded	Not awarded	Panathlon International	Not awarded
2000	Not awarded	Rolland Boitelle (France)	Students and teachers from Sydney and New South Wales (Australia)	Not awarded
2001	Simone Moro (Italy)	Eusebio da Silva Ferreira (Portugal)	Kipchoge Keino (Kenya)	Not awarded
2002	Denmark national football team	Mária Mračnová (Slovakia)	Albert Jannes Buisman (Netherlands)	Not awarded
2003	Tana Umaga (New Zealand)	Wayne Gretzky (Canada)	Janusz Piewcewicz (Poland)	Not awarded
2004	Alexei Nemov (Russia); Markus Rogan (Austria)	Miguel Induráin (Spain)	Bruno Grandi (Italy)	Not awarded
2005	Sébastien Loeb (France)	Pete Sampras (United States); Éva Székely (Hungary)	Not awarded	Not awarded
2006	Hilal Coşkuner (Turkey)	Gérard Saillant (France); Herb Elliott (Australia)	Andras Kő (Hungary)	Not awarded
2007	Graham Henry (New Zealand)	Jan Železný (Czech Republic); Mary Glen-Haig (United Kingdom)	Shaozu Zhang (China)	Not awarded
2008	Ivan Bulaja (Croatia) and Petar Cupać (Croatia) and Pavle Kostov (Croatia)	Edoardo Mangiarotti (Italy)	UEFA	Not awarded
2009	Elvan Abeylegesse (Turkey); Ammanuel Merkorios (Eritrea); Giuseppe Pillon (Italy)	Saúl Mendoza (Mexico); Bill Slater (England)	Klaus Klaeren (Germany); Pál Schmitt (Hungary); Herbert Ehlen (Germany)	Not awarded
2010	Gao Feng (China); Amin Motevaselzadeh (Iran); Darius Draudvila (Lithuania)	Edwin Moses (United States)	Tegla Loroupe (Kenya); Walther Tröger (Germany)	Not awarded
2011	Erhan Yavuz (Turkey)	Walter Kilger (Germany); Laura Vaca (Mexico)	Erika Miklósa (Hungary); Pál Szekeres (Hungary)	Not awarded
2012	Jochen Wollmert (Germany)	Sebastian Coe (United Kingdom)	Carlos Gonçalves (Portugal)	Christiana Pavlou (Cyprus); Fenerbahçe S.K. U–15 team (Turkey)
2013	Martin Damsbo (Denmark)	Mohamed Abdelaziz Ghonem (Egypt)	International Children's Games Committee (Slovenia)	Hana Dragojevic (Croatia) "Triqui Children" Team (Mexico)
2014	Łukasz Kubot (Poland)	Javier Zanetti (Argentina)	Ligue Francophone de Hockey (Belgium)	Nilufar Muhiddinova (Turkmenistan)
2015	Ruth Chebitok (Kenya); Ashley Liew (Singapore)	Not awarded	Tadeusz Olszański (Poland)	Denis Samoylov (Poland)
2016	Jorge Ariel Rodriguez (Argentina)	Jacques Rogge (Belgium)	Turkish Olympic Committee; Fair Play Committee (Turkey)	Junior Men's Épée Team of Ukraine
2017	Thomas Baroukh (France) and Thibaut Hacot (France) and Thibault Colard (France)	Jacques Ferran (France)	Panathlon Wallonie-Bruxelles (Belgium)	Valerio Catoia (Italy)
2018	Eivind Vold (Norway); Fabio Caramel (Italy)	Azad Rahimov (Azerbaijan); David Smetanine (France)	Mohamed bin Zayed Al Nahyan (United Arab Emirates) and UAE Wrestling and Judo Federation (United Arab Emirates) and International Judo Federation and EuroNews	Péter László Gasztonyi (Hungary)
2019	Roger Casugay (Philippines)	Carles Puyol (Spain)	Turkish National Olympic Committee (Turkey)	Giovanni Borgonovo (Italy)
2020	AEK Athens F.C. (Greece)	Nikita Simonyan (Russia); Franco Ascani (Italy)	Maxime Mbanda (Italy); City of Brussels (Belgium)	Not awarded
2021	Denmark national football team	Mauro Borghi (Italy)	Wenke Thewis (Belgium)	Giovanni Lava (Italy)
2022	Kai Verbij (Netherlands); Sheila Liliana Tejeda (Mexico)	Kathrine Switzer (United States)	Christian Hinterberger (Austria); Stop Racism in Sport (Belgium) and Panathlon Wallonie-Bruxelles (Belgium)	Japan women's national under-20 football team

== Presidents ==
- Jean Borotra, CIFP founder, 1963–1988
- Willi Daume, 1988–1996
- Louis Guirandou-N'Diaye, 1996–1999

Since 2000, Jenő Kamuti has served as the CIFP president.

Honorary Presidents

- Michael Morris, 3rd Baron Killanin, past President of the IOC (1974)
- René Maheu, the sixth Director-General of UNESCO (1974)
- Juan Antonio Samaranch, President of the IOC (1981)
- Jean Borotra, "Honorary President – Founder" (1988)
- Jacques Rogge, President of the IOC (2003)
- Koïchiro Matsuura, Director-General of UNESCO (2005)

== See also ==
- FIFA Fair Play Award
- Jean Borotra Sportsmanship Award
- Lady Byng Memorial Trophy
- Pierre de Coubertin Medal, awarded by the IOC
