= Skateboarding at the 2024 Summer Olympics – Women's park =

Women's park at the Games of the XXXIII Olympiad
- Olympic skateboarding
- Venue: Place de la Concorde
- Dates: 6 August 2024
- Competitors: 22 from 13 nations

Medalists
1st place, gold medalist(s)		Arisa Trew	Australia
2nd place, silver medalist(s)		Cocona Hiraki	Japan
3rd place, bronze medalist(s)		Sky Brown	Great Britain

The 2024 Summer Olympics women's park skateboarding competition occurred on 6 August 2024 at Place de la Concorde in Paris, France.

Sakura Yosozumi was a defending 2020 Olympic champion, but she was eliminated in the semifinals and did not qualify for the finals.

== Competition format ==
In the prelims, the 22 participating skateboarders were sorted into four heats. Each skater did three 45-second runs in their designated heat. The best run score of each skater's three runs built a ranking. The eight top-ranked skaters from the combined ranking of the heats qualified for the final.

== Results ==
=== Semifinals ===
The top-eight skateboarders of twenty-two advanced to the finals.

Rank	Heat	Skateboarder	Nation	Run			Notes
Rank	Heat	Skateboarder	Nation	1	2	3	Notes
1	1	Cocona Hiraki	Japan	~~85.04~~	88.07	~~25.34~~	Q
2	1	Bryce Wettstein	United States	~~21.76~~	~~75.22~~	85.65	Q
3	1	Hinano Kusaki	Japan	~~44.00~~	~~52.71~~	85.11	Q
4	3	Sky Brown	Great Britain	84.75	~~71.55~~	~~10.66~~	Q
5	4	Heili Sirviö	Finland	~~58.96~~	83.42	~~69.90~~	Q
6	3	Arisa Trew	Australia	~~72.15~~	82.95	~~64.95~~	Q
7	4	Naia Laso	Spain	~~29.39~~	82.49	~~29.43~~	Q
8	4	Dora Varella	Brazil	~~76.57~~	82.29	~~69.30~~	Q
9	2	Isadora Pacheco	Brazil	82.07	~~63.66~~	~~64.48~~	
10	1	Sakura Yosozumi	Japan	79.70	~~20.04~~	~~9.33~~	
11	4	Ruby Trew	Australia	77.89	~~61.35~~	~~70.80~~	
12	2	Raicca Ventura	Brazil	76.24	~~64.33~~	~~56.86~~	
13	3	Ruby Lilley	United States	~~74.98~~	75.07	~~2.66~~	
14	2	Lilly Stoephasius	Germany	~~71.79~~	~~40.76~~	74.40	
15	3	Lola Tambling	Great Britain	73.85	~~53.05~~	~~19.50~~	
16	1	Émilie Alexandre	France	~~72.13~~	~~72.94~~	73.48	
17	1	Julia Benedetti	Spain	~~4.33~~	~~8.50~~	70.27	
18	2	Zheng Haohao	China	63.19	~~16.01~~	~~16.07~~	
19	3	Minna Stess	United States	~~20.10~~	54.71	~~54.53~~	
20	2	Fay De Fazio Ebert	Canada	~~18.66~~	~~30.00~~	51.82	
21	2	Nana Taboulet	France	~~7.41~~	~~29.53~~	42.33	
22	4	Aya Asaqas	Morocco	13.68	~~2.00~~	~~12.80~~	

=== Final ===
Rank	Skateboarder	Nation	Run		
Rank	Skateboarder	Nation	1	2	3
1st place, gold medalist(s)	Arisa Trew	Australia	~~35.53~~	~~90.11~~	93.18
2nd place, silver medalist(s)	Cocona Hiraki	Japan	~~91.98~~	~~79.79~~	92.63
3rd place, bronze medalist(s)	Sky Brown	Great Britain	~~80.57~~	~~91.60~~	92.31
4	Dora Varella	Brazil	~~85.06~~	~~77.62~~	89.14
5	Heili Sirviö	Finland	~~71.40~~	~~71.56~~	88.89
6	Bryce Wettstein	United States	88.12	~~9.66~~	~~73.26~~
7	Naia Laso	Spain	~~59.85~~	~~7.66~~	86.28
8	Hinano Kusaki	Japan	~~2.66~~	~~17.86~~	69.76

== See also ==
- Skateboarding at the 2024 Summer Olympics – Men's park
- Skateboarding at the 2024 Summer Olympics – Women's street
- Cycling at the 2024 Summer Olympics – Women's BMX freestyle
