= Skateboarding at the 2018 Asian Games – Women's park =

Women's park at the 2018 Asian Games
- Venue: Jakabaring Sport City
- Date: 29 August 2018
- Competitors: 6 from 4 nations

Medalists
gold medal	Sakura Yosozumi	Japan
silver medal	Kaya Isa	Japan
bronze medal	Zhang Xin	China

The women's park competition at the 2018 Asian Games took place on 29 August 2018 at the JSC Skateboard Stadium.

== Schedule ==
All times are Western Indonesia Time (UTC+07:00)

Date	Time	Event
Wednesday, 29 August 2018	09:15	Final

== Results ==
Legend

- DNS — Did not start

Rank	Athlete	Run 1	Run 2	Run 3	Best
1st place, gold medalist(s)	Sakura Yosozumi (JPN)	64.66	66.66	54.00	66.66
2nd place, silver medalist(s)	Kaya Isa (JPN)	53.00	58.33	58.33	58.33
3rd place, bronze medalist(s)	Zhang Xin (CHN)	41.33	44.00	43.00	44.00
4	Bunga Nyimas (INA)	34.66	35.66	41.00	41.00
5	Lou Jiayi (CHN)	33.00	36.33	37.00	37.00
—	Christina Grace Lai (MAS)				DNS
