= Sakura Yosozumi =

Japanese professional skateboarder

Sakura Yosozumi 四十住 さくら
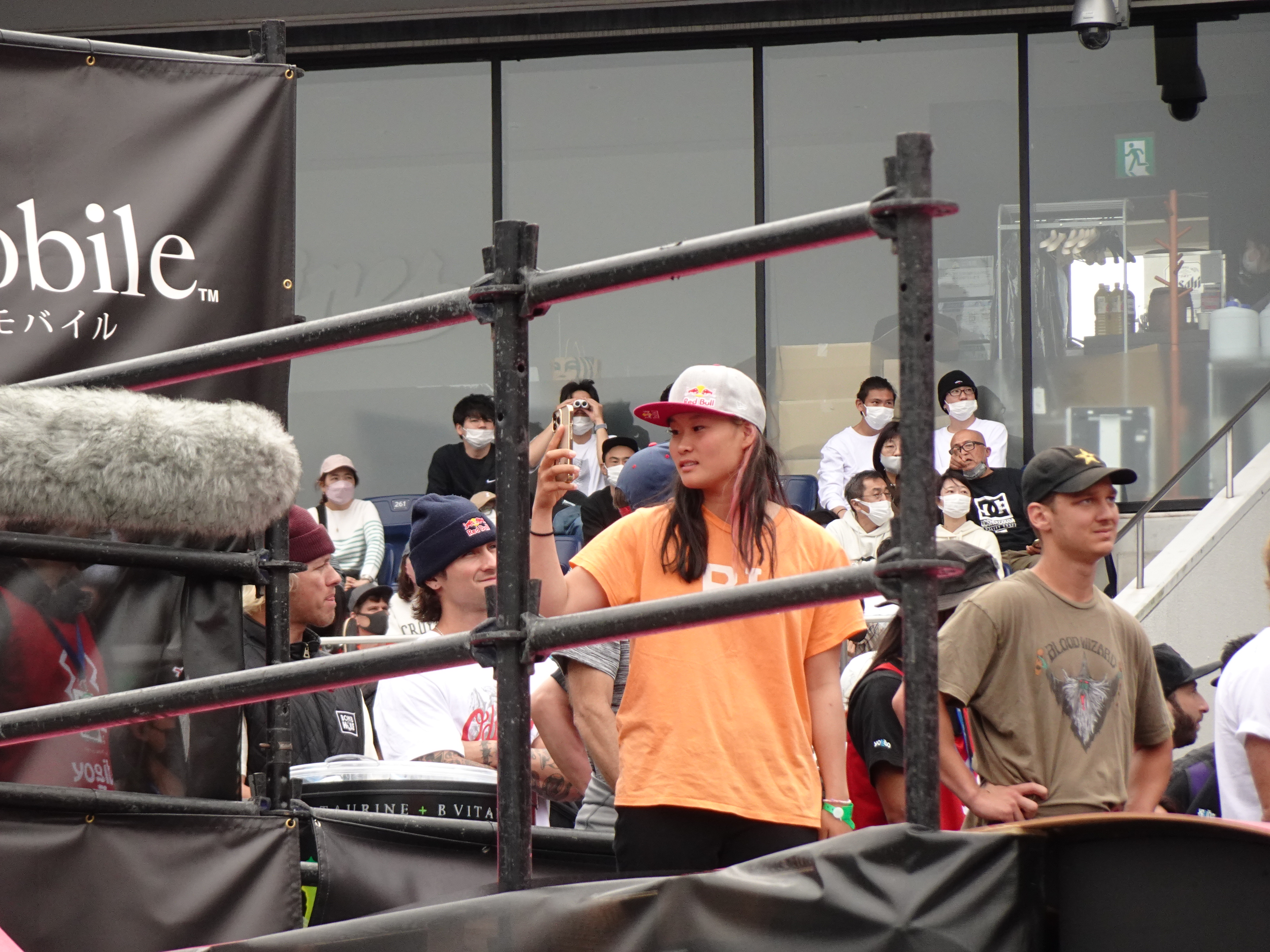
- Yosozumi at X Games Chiba 2022

Personal information
- Native name: 四十住 さくら
- Nationality: Japanese
- Born: 15 March 2002 (age 24) Iwade, Wakayama, Japan
- Height: 159 cm (5 ft 3 in) (2018)
- Weight: 52 kg (115 lb) (2018)

Sport
- Country: Japan
- Sport: Skateboarding
- Position: Regular footed
- Rank: 3rd
- Events: Park, bowl
- Pro tour(s): Dew Tour; Vans Park Series
Medal record
Women's park skateboarding
Representing Japan
Olympic Games
Gold medal – first place	2020 Tokyo	Park
World Championships
Gold medal – first place	2018 Nanjing	Park
Silver medal – second place	2019 São Paulo	Park
Bronze medal – third place	2023 Sharjah	Park
Asian Games
Gold medal – first place	2018 Jakarta–Palembang	Park
X Games
Gold medal – first place	2022 Chiba	Park
Silver medal – second place	2022 California	Park
Silver medal – second place	2025 Osaka	Park
Bronze medal – third place	2018 Minneapolis	Park
Dew Tour
Silver medal – second place	2022 Des Moines	Park

Sakura Yosozumi (四十住 さくら, Yosozumi Sakura; born 15 March 2002) is a Japanese professional skateboarder. She won gold medals in the inaugural women's park events at the Asian Games, in 2018, and at the Olympic Games, in 2021.

== Career ==
Yosozumi started skateboarding in 2013 and was influenced by her older brother to take up the sport. In September 2017, it was reported that on weekdays she trained for five hours after attending school.

=== World Cup ===
At the 2016 World Cup Skateboarding which was hosted in Tokyo, she competed in the women's park event where she finished 29th among competitors. She returned in the 2018 edition hosted in Orange, California and competed in the bowl event instead where she placed sixth.

=== Vans Park Series ===
Yosozumi skated at the 2017 Vans Park Series (VPS) Asian Championships in Singapore where she finished third. At the women's division of the VPS Pro Tour in Brazil in June 2018, Yosozumi claimed the top spot by outbesting Yndiara Asp of Brazil and Brighton Zeuner of the United States. At the Huntington Beach, California leg, she finished second in the qualifying round, though she failed to reach the podium in the final and finished fifth overall.

=== X Games ===
Yosuzumi competed at X Games Minneapolis 2018 in the women's park event. She finished second in the qualifying round while she obtained a bronze medal in the final behind gold medalist Brighton Zeuner and Sabre Norris of Australia.

=== Asian Games ===
She represented Japan at the 2018 Asian Games, hosted in Jakarta and Palembang, Indonesia. Yosozumi claimed one of Japan's three gold medals in the skateboard discipline after topping the rankings of the women's park event. She performed ahead of silver medalist and compatriot Kaya Isa and bronze medalist Zhang Xin of China.

=== Olympics ===
At the 2020 Summer Olympics in Tokyo, Yosozumi competed in the first-ever Olympic women's park skateboarding event, in which she claimed the gold medal with a best score of 60.09. She narrowly bested compatriot Kokona Hiraki, who took silver with a 59.04 score, and Team GB competitor Sky Brown, who took bronze with a 56.47 score.
