= Sirviö =

Sirviö is a Finnish surname. Notable people with the surname include:

- Arto Sirviö (born 1962), Finnish professional ice hockey player
- Heili Sirviö (born 2011), Finnish skateboarder
- Sami Sirviö (born 1970), Finnish-born lead guitarist of the Swedish rock band Kent
- Riikka Sirviö (born 1974), Finnish cross-country skier
