= Finland at the 2024 Summer Olympics =

- IOC code: FIN
- NOC: Finnish Olympic Committee
- Website: olympiakomitea.fi (in Finnish and Swedish)

in Paris, France 26 July 2024 – 11 August 2024
- Competitors: 56 (23 men and 33 women) in 13 sports
- Flag bearers (opening): Eetu Kallioinen & Sinem Kurtbay
- Flag bearer (closing): Saga Vanninen
- Medals: Gold 0 Silver 0 Bronze 0 Total 0

Summer Olympics appearances (overview)
- 1908; 1912; 1920; 1924; 1928; 1932; 1936; 1948; 1952; 1956; 1960; 1964; 1968; 1972; 1976; 1980; 1984; 1988; 1992; 1996; 2000; 2004; 2008; 2012; 2016; 2020; 2024; 2028

Other related appearances
- 1906 Intercalated Games

Finland competed at the 2024 Summer Olympics in Paris from 26 July to 11 August 2024. It signified the nation's participation in every single edition of the Summer Olympic Games since its official debut in 1908.

The best placement by a Finnish athlete in the 2024 Games was fifth, attained by three athletes: Pihla Kaivo-oja in women's 50 kg boxing, Silja Kosonen in women's hammer throw, and Heili Sirviö in women's park in skateboarding. The 2024 Games marked the first time in Finnish Olympic history that it failed to win a medal, ending the streak of medalling in 50 consecutive Olympic Games (Summer and Winter).

== Competitors ==
The following is the list of number of competitors in the Games.

Sport	Men	Women	Total
Archery	1	0	1
Athletics	7	18	25
Badminton	1	0	1
Boxing	0	1	1
Cycling	1	1	2
Equestrian	1	4	5
Golf	2	2	4
Judo	2	0	2
Sailing	3	4	7
Shooting	2	1	3
Skateboarding	0	1	1
Swimming	1	1	2
Wrestling	2	0	2
Total	23	33	56

== Archery ==
Finland qualified one male archer to compete in the individual recurve event, through the final release of the Olympic ranking for Paris 2024.

Athlete	Event	Ranking round		Round of 64	Round of 32	Round of 16	Quarterfinals	Semifinals	Final / BM	
Athlete	Event	Score	Seed	Opposition Score	Opposition Score	Opposition Score	Opposition Score	Opposition Score	Opposition Score	Rank
Antti Tekoniemi	Men's individual	656	41	Tai Y-h (TPE); L 0–6	Did not advance					33

== Athletics ==
Finnish track and field athletes achieved the entry standards for Paris 2024, either by passing the direct qualifying mark (or time for track and road races) or by world ranking, in the following events (a maximum of 3 athletes each):

Key

- Note–Ranks given for track events are within the athlete's heat only
- Q = Qualified for the next round
- q = Qualified for the next round as a fastest loser or, in field events, by position without achieving the qualifying target
- NR = National record
- N/A = Round not applicable for the event
- Bye = Athlete not required to compete in round

Track and road events

Athlete	Event	Preliminary		Heat		Repechage		Semifinal		Final	
Athlete	Event	Result	Rank	Result	Rank	Result	Rank	Result	Rank	Result	Rank
Elmo Lakka	Men's 110 m hurdles	—N/a		13.84	7 Re	13.75	7	Did not advance			
Topi Raitanen	Men's 3000 m steeplechase	—N/a		8:33.12	11	—N/a				Did not advance	
Aku Partanen	Men's 20 km walk	—N/a								1:22:56	32
Lotta Kemppinen	Women's 100 m	Bye		11.56	7	—N/a		Did not advance			
Eveliina Määttänen	Women's 800 m	—N/a		2:00.02	4 Re	2:00.38	4	Did not advance			
Sara Lappalainen	Women's 1500 m	—N/a		4:08.66	12 Re	DNS	–	Did not advance			
Nathalie Blomqvist	Women's 5000 metres	—N/a		15:02.75	7 Q	—N/a				14:53.10	13
Lotta Harala	Women's 100 m hurdles	—N/a		12.97	5 Re	12.86	1 Q	13.05	8	Did not advance	
Reetta Hurske	Women's 100 m hurdles	—N/a		12.96	6 Re	12.83	3	Did not advance			
Viivi Lehikoinen	Women's 400 m hurdles	—N/a		56.67	7 Re	58.04	6	Did not advance			
Ilona Mononen	Women's 3000 m steeplechase	—N/a		9:22.77 NR	6	—N/a				Did not advance	
Camilla Richardsson	Women's marathon	—N/a								2:38:02	65

Field events

Athlete	Event	Qualification		Final	
Athlete	Event	Result	Position	Result	Position
Urho Kujanpää	Men's pole vault	5.40	29	Did not advance	
Oliver Helander	Men's javelin throw	83.81	10 q	82.68	9
Lassi Etelätalo	Men's javelin throw	82.91	12 q	84.58	8
Toni Keränen	Men's javelin throw	85.27	8 Q	80.92	10
Ella Junnila	Women's high jump	1.83	28	Did not advance	
Wilma Murto	Women's pole vault	4.55	9 q	4.70	6
Elina Lampela	Women's pole vault	4.55	7 q	4.40	14
Senni Salminen	Women's triple jump	DNS	–	Did not advance	
Silja Kosonen	Women's hammer throw	72.11	9 q	74.04	5
Krista Tervo	Women's hammer throw	74.79 NR	1 Q	73.83	6
Suvi Koskinen	Women's hammer throw	67.90	21	Did not advance	
Anni-Linnea Alanen	Women's javelin throw	55.30	30	Did not advance	

Combined events - Women's heptathlon

Athlete	Event	100H	HJ	SP	200 m	LJ	JT	800 m	Final	Rank
Saga Vanninen	Result	13.61	1.74	14.19	24.74	5.85	47.00	2:14.36	6163	15
Saga Vanninen	Points	1034	903	807	911	804	802	902	6163	15

== Badminton ==
Finland entered one badminton player into the Olympic tournament based on the BWF Race to Paris Rankings.

Athlete	Event	Group stage			Elimination	Quarter-final	Semi-final	Final / BM	
Athlete	Event	Opposition Score	Opposition Score	Rank	Opposition Score	Opposition Score	Opposition Score	Opposition Score	Rank
Kalle Koljonen	Men's singles	Paul (MRI); W (21–9, 21–10)	Vitidsarn (THA); L (4–21, 0–8) RET	RET	Did not advance				38

== Boxing ==
Athlete	Event	Round of 32	Round of 16	Quarterfinals	Semifinals	Final	
Athlete	Event	Opposition Result	Opposition Result	Opposition Result	Opposition Result	Opposition Result	Rank
Pihla Kaivo-oja	Women's 50 kg	Tembo (ZAM); W 5–0	Lozano (USA); W 5–0	Çakıroğlu (TUR); L 0–5	Did not advance		5

== Cycling ==
=== Road ===
Finland entered one female rider to compete in the road race events at the Olympic, through the establishment UCI Nation Ranking.

Athlete	Event	Time	Rank
Anniina Ahtosalo	Women's road race	4:07:04	37
Anniina Ahtosalo	Women's time trial	45:05.18	30

=== Mountain biking ===
Finland entered one male rider to compete in the mountain biking event at the Olympic, through the re-allocation of unused quota places.

Athlete	Event	Time	Rank
Joni Savaste	Men's cross-country	DNF	–

== Equestrian ==
Finland entered a squad of five equestrians. Finnish equestrians qualified for the team dressage events and individual eventing events, through the establishments of final olympics ranking.

=== Dressage ===
Athlete	Horse	Event	Grand Prix		Grand Prix Special		Grand Prix Freestyle		Overall	
Athlete	Horse	Event	Score	Rank	Score	Rank	Technical	Artistic	Score	Rank
Emma Kanerva	Greek Air	Individual	73.680	17 q	—N/a		75.929	87.286	81.607	12
Joanna Robinson	Glamouraline	Individual	65.637	54	—N/a		Did not advance			
Henri Ruoste	Tiffanys Diamond	Individual	70.621	30	—N/a		Did not advance			
Emma Kanerva; Joanna Robinson; Henri Ruoste	See above	Team	209.938	9 Q	212.036	8	—N/a		212.036	8

Qualification Legend: Q = Qualified for the final based on position in group; q = Qualified for the final based on overall position

=== Eventing ===
Athlete	Horse	Event	Dressage		Cross-country			Jumping						Total	
Athlete	Horse	Event	Dressage		Cross-country			Qualifier			Final			Total	
Athlete	Horse	Event	Penalties	Rank	Penalties	Total	Rank	Penalties	Total	Rank	Penalties	Total	Rank	Penalties	Rank
Veera Manninen	Sir Greg	Individual	36.80	50	18.40	55.20	39	1.20	56.40	36	Did not advance			56.40	36
Sanna Siltakorpi	Bofey Click	Individual	35.40	=43	21.80	57.20	40	Withdrawn							

== Golf ==
Finland entered three golfers into the Olympic tournament. Sami Välimäki qualified directly for the games in the men's individual competitions, and Ursula Wikström and Noora Komulainen qualified directly for the games in the women's individual competitions based on their world ranking performances, as the top 60 ranked players, on the IGF World Rankings.

Athlete	Event	Round 1	Round 2	Round 3	Round 4	Total		
Athlete	Event	Score	Score	Score	Score	Score	Par	Rank
Sami Välimäki	Men's	67	71	72	75	285	+1	T45
Tapio Pulkkanen	Men's	69	72	71	70	282	−2	T35
Ursula Wikström	Women's	82	72	81	72	307	+19	57
Noora Komulainen	Women's	84	82	78	Withdrawn			

== Judo ==
Finland entered two judokas into the Olympic tournament subsequent to the conclusion of the qualification window (23 June 2024) of the world ranking list prepared by the International Judo Federation (IJF).

Athlete	Event	Round of 32	Round of 16	Quarterfinals	Semifinals	Repechage	Final / BM	
Athlete	Event	Opposition Result	Opposition Result	Opposition Result	Opposition Result	Opposition Result	Opposition Result	Rank
Luukas Saha	−66 kg	Demirel (TUR); W 01–00	Vieru (MDA); L 00–01	Did not advance				9
Martti Puumalainen	+100 kg	Bye	Kokauri (AZE); L 00–10	Did not advance				9

== Sailing ==
Finnish sailors qualified one boat in each of the following classes through the 2023 Sailing World Championships, the class-associated Worlds, and the continental regattas.

Elimination events

Athlete	Event	Opening rounds																	Quarterfinal	Semifinal	Final	Final rank
Athlete	Event	1	2	3	4	5	6	7	8	9	10	11	12	13	14	15	Net points	Rank	Quarterfinal	Semifinal	Final	Final rank
Jakob Eklund	Men's IQFoil	14	17	18	~~19~~	18	~~20~~	10	16	16	19	18	10	16	Cancelled		172	20	Did not advance			20

Medal race events

Athlete	Event	Race													Net points	Final rank
Athlete	Event	1	2	3	4	5	6	7	8	9	10	11	12	M*	Net points	Final rank
Kaarle Tapper	Men's ILCA 7	23	18	9	32	~~44 DNC~~	44 DNC	44 DNC	44 DNC	Cancelled		—N/a		EL	214	37
Monika Mikkola	Women's ILCA 6	18	2	5	13	30	29	~~44 BFD~~	18	12	Cancelled	—N/a		EL	127	16
Ronja Grönblom; Veera Hokka	Women's 49erFX	8	14	18	13	10	1	8	4	~~21~~; ~~DSQ~~	11	16	13	EL	116	15
Sinem Kurtbay; Akseli Keskinen	Mixed Nacra 17	3	7	4	4	11	5	7	11	11	12	~~15~~	4	18	97	7

M = Medal race; EL = Eliminated – did not advance into the medal race

== Shooting ==
Finnish shooters achieved quota places for the following events based on their results at the 2022 and 2023 ISSF World Championships, 2022, 2023, and 2024 European Championships, 2023 European Games, and 2024 ISSF World Olympic Qualification Tournament.

Athlete	Event	Qualification		Final	
Athlete	Event	Points	Rank	Points	Rank
Aleksi Leppä	Men's 10 m air rifle	627.8	22	Did not advance	
Aleksi Leppä	Men's 50 m rifle 3 positions	586-31x	24	Did not advance	
Eetu Kallioinen	Men's skeet	117	20	Did not advance	
Noora Antikainen	Women's trap	107	30	Did not advance	

== Skateboarding ==
Finland entered one skateboarder into the Olympic tournament. Heili Sirviö qualified to compete in the women's park event after being ranked in the top 20 within the Olympic World Skateboarding ranking.

Athlete	Event	Qualification		Final	
Athlete	Event	Result	Rank	Result	Rank
Heili Sirviö	Women's park	83.42	5 Q	88.89	5

== Swimming ==
Finnish swimmers achieved qualifying standards in the following events (up to a maximum of 2 swimmers in each event at the Olympic Qualifying Time (OQT), and potentially 1 at the Olympic Selection Time (OST)):

Athlete	Event	Heat		Semifinal		Final	
Athlete	Event	Time	Rank	Time	Rank	Time	Rank
Matti Mattsson	Men's 200 m breaststroke	2:11.18	18	Did not advance			
Ida Hulkko	Women's 100 m breaststroke	1:08.73	26	Did not advance			

== Wrestling ==
Finland qualified two wrestlers for the following classes into the Olympic competition. Jonni Sarkkinen qualified for the games by winning the semifinal round at the 2024 European Qualification Tournament in Baku, Azerbaijan; meanwhile Arvi Savolainen qualified for the games through the 2024 World Qualification Tournament in Istanbul, Turkey.

Key:

- VT (ranking points: 5–0 or 0–5) – Victory by fall.
- VB (ranking points: 5–0 or 0–5) – Victory by injury (VF for forfeit, VA for withdrawal or disqualification)
- PP (ranking points: 3–1 or 1–3) – Decision by points – the loser with technical points.
- PO (ranking points: 3–0 or 0–3) – Decision by points – the loser without technical points.
- ST (ranking points: 4–0 or 0–4) – Great superiority – the loser without technical points and a margin of victory of at least 8 (Greco-Roman) or 10 (freestyle) points.
- SP (ranking points: 4–1 or 1–4) – Technical superiority – the loser with technical points and a margin of victory of at least 8 (Greco-Roman) or 10 (freestyle) points.

Greco-Roman

Athlete	Event	Round of 16	Quarterfinal	Semifinal	Repechage	Final / BM	
Athlete	Event	Opposition Result	Opposition Result	Opposition Result	Opposition Result	Opposition Result	Rank
Jonni Sarkkinen	Men's −77 kg	Amoyan (ARM); L 0–4 ^{ST}	Did not advance				13
Arvi Savolainen	Men's −97 kg	Rouabah (ALG); W 3–0 ^{PO}	Rosillo (CUB); L 1–3 ^{PP}	Did not advance			8

== See also ==
- Finland at the 2024 Winter Youth Olympics
