= Varella =

Varella is a surname. Notable people with the surname include:

- Dora Varella (born 2001), Brazilian professional skateboarder
- Drauzio Varella (born 1943), Brazilian doctor, educator, scientist, medical science popularizer, and author
