= Naia Laso =

Spanish skateboarder (born 2008)

Personal information
- Full name: Naia Laso Ponciano
- Born: 19 November 2008 (age 17) Bermeo, Spain

Sport
- Country: Spain
- Sport: Skateboarding
- Rank: 15th
- Event: Park
Medal record
Women's park skateboarding
Representing Spain
World Championships
Bronze medal – third place	2024 Rome	Park

Naia Laso Ponciano (Note: In this Spanish name, the first or paternal surname is Laso and the second or maternal family name is Ponciano.) (born November 19, 2008) is a Spanish skateboarder. She represented Spain at the 2024 Summer Olympics. Laso is a three-time Spanish skateboarding national champion.

== Career ==
Laso competed at the 2023 World Skateboarding Championship in Rome. During the qualification round she had the highest score of 83.18 points. She finished the championship in fifth place.

In March 2024, she won the World Skate Tour (WST) stop in Dubai, with a score of 93.46 points. Following the 2024 Olympic Qualifier Series, Laso qualified for the 2024 Summer Olympics. During the park event at the Olympics she finished in seventh place with a score of 86.28 points.

In September 2024, she competed at the 2024 World Skateboarding Championship. During the qualification round she had the highest score of 88.21 points. During the finals she won a bronze medal with a score of 90.14 points.
