= Skateboarding at the 2020 Summer Olympics – Women's park =

Olympic skateboarding event

Women's park at the Games of the XXXII Olympiad
- Olympic skateboarding
- Venue: Ariake Urban Sports Park
- Dates: 4 August 2021
- Competitors: 20 from 13 nations
- Winning score: 60.09

Medalists
1st place, gold medalist(s)		Sakura Yosozumi	Japan
2nd place, silver medalist(s)		Kokona Hiraki	Japan
3rd place, bronze medalist(s)		Sky Brown	Great Britain

The 2020 Summer Olympics women's park skateboarding competition occurred on 4 August 2021 at Ariake Urban Sports Park in Tokyo, Japan.

It was originally scheduled to be held in 2020, but on 24 March 2020, the Olympics were postponed to 2021 due to the COVID-19 pandemic.

Sakura Yosozumi and Kokona Hiraki of Japan won the gold and silver medals, with Sky Brown of Great Britain winning the bronze medal.

== Competition format ==
In the prelims, the twenty participating skateboarders were sorted into four heats of five skaters each. Each skater did three 45-second runs in their designated heat. The best run score of each skater's three runs built a ranking. The eight top-ranked skaters from the combined ranking of the heats qualified for the final.

== Results ==
=== Semifinals ===
The top-eight skateboarders of twenty advanced to the finals.

Rank	Heat	Skateboarder	Nation	Run			Notes
Rank	Heat	Skateboarder	Nation	1	2	3	Notes
1	4	Misugu Okamoto	Japan	~~54.31~~	~~55.59~~	58.51	Q
2	3	Sky Brown	Great Britain	~~55.26~~	57.40	~~40.03~~	Q
3	2	Kokona Hiraki	Japan	~~49.44~~	52.46	~~6.06~~	Q
4	1	Sakura Yosozumi	Japan	~~42.50~~	~~45.93~~	45.98	Q
5	4	Bryce Wettstein	United States	44.50	~~2.70~~	~~40.03~~	Q
6	4	Poppy Olsen	Australia	44.03	~~38.04~~	~~34.37~~	Q
7	3	Yndiara Asp	Brazil	43.23	~~6.64~~	~~21.84~~	Q
8	1	Dora Varella	Brazil	~~31.53~~	41.59	~~13.86~~	Q
9	1	Lilly Stoephasius	Germany	38.37	~~24.33~~	~~10.07~~	
10	4	Isadora Pacheco	Brazil	~~36.71~~	~~2.13~~	37.08	
11	2	Jordyn Barratt	United States	35.22	~~19.34~~	~~23.44~~	
12	2	Brighton Zeuner	United States	~~31.21~~	~~33.25~~	34.06	
13	3	Madeleine Larcheron	France	32.34	~~26.42~~	~~32.15~~	
14	2	Lizzie Armanto	Finland	~~24.26~~	~~22.76~~	30.01	
15	4	Xin Zhang	China	~~23.25~~	~~23.03~~	28.16	
16	3	Julia Benedetti	Spain	27.76	~~27.50~~	~~22.31~~	
17	3	Amelia Brodka	Poland	~~6.00~~	20.17	~~18.20~~	
18	1	Bombette Martin	Great Britain	~~14.40~~	16.21	~~14.31~~	
19	1	Josefina Tapia Varas	Chile	9.73	~~3.12~~	~~9.72~~	
20	2	Melissa Williams	South Africa	~~7.93~~	~~5.69~~	8.30	

=== Final ===
Rank	Skateboarder	Nation	Run			Notes
Rank	Skateboarder	Nation	1	2	3	Notes
1st place, gold medalist(s)	Sakura Yosozumi	Japan	60.09	~~32.20~~	~~50.04~~	
2nd place, silver medalist(s)	Kokona Hiraki	Japan	~~58.05~~	59.04	~~5.70~~	
3rd place, bronze medalist(s)	Sky Brown	Great Britain	~~47.53~~	~~47.37~~	56.47	
4	Misugu Okamoto	Japan	~~20.68~~	53.58	~~51.99~~	
5	Poppy Olsen	Australia	~~35.20~~	46.04	~~39.28~~	
6	Bryce Wettstein	United States	44.50	~~17.96~~	~~16.21~~	
7	Dora Varella	Brazil	40.42	~~6.18~~	~~38.54~~	
8	Yndiara Asp	Brazil	37.34	~~7.14~~	~~7.04~~	

== See also ==
- Skateboarding at the 2020 Summer Olympics – Men's park
- Skateboarding at the 2020 Summer Olympics – Women's street
- Cycling at the 2020 Summer Olympics – Women's BMX freestyle
