= Skateboarding at the 2024 Summer Olympics =

Skateboarding at the Games of the XXXIII Olympiad
- Venue: Place de la Concorde
- Dates: 28 July – 7 August 2024
- No. of events: 4 (2 men, 2 women)
- Competitors: 88 from 23 nations

Skateboarding competitions at the 2024 Summer Olympics were held from 28 July to 7 August at Place de la Concorde, returning to the program for the second time since the sport's official debut three years earlier in Tokyo 2020. With the showcase of youthful talents and the level of competition continually rising, Paris 2024 will witness more skateboarders compete across four medal events (street and park for both men and women) as the roster size gradually expands from 80 in Tokyo to 88.

== Qualification ==
88 quota places are available for eligible skateboarders to compete in Paris 2024. NOCs can enter a maximum of six skateboarders (three men and three women) in each of the two disciplines — street and park. Host nation France reserves four spots with one for each event, while the same amount will be set aside for the eligible NOCs under the Universality rules.

The remainder of the total quota is attributed to a large number of skateboarders based on the total points accrued through the Olympic World Skateboarding ranking list of 24 June 2024. The top twenty eligible skateboarders after three consecutive periods of qualification (22 June – 31 December 2022; 1 January – 31 December 2023; and 1 January – 23 June 2024) in each gender-based event will be selected by name on the official list of athletes for Paris 2024.

== Competition schedule ==
Legend
Q	Qualification	F	Final

A = Afternoon session, starting at 10:00 local time (08:00 UTC) for street; and at 12:30 local time (10:30 UTC) for park.
E = Evening session, starting at 17:00 local time (15:00 UTC) for street; and at 17:30 local time (15:30 UTC) for park.

Schedule
Event ↓ / Date →	Sun 28		Mon 29		Tue 6		Wed 7	
Men's park							Q	F
Men's street			Q	F				
Women's park					Q	F		
Women's street	Q	F						

== Participating NOCs ==
A total of 88 skateboarders from 23 National Olympic Committees (NOCs) participated.

- Argentina (2)
- Australia (9)
- Brazil (12)
- Canada (4)
- China (4)
- Colombia (1)
- Denmark (1)
- Finland (1)
- France (7)
- Germany (2)
- Great Britain (3)
- Italy (2)
- Japan (10)
- Morocco (1)
- Netherlands (2)
- Portugal (2)
- Puerto Rico (1)
- Slovakia (1)
- South Africa (3)
- Spain (5)
- Sweden (1)
- Thailand (1)
- United States (12)

== Medal summary ==
A total of 12 medals were won by five NOC's.

=== Medal table ===
* Host nation (France)

Rank	NOC	Gold	Silver	Bronze	Total
1	Japan	2	2	0	4
2	Australia	2	0	0	2
3	United States	0	2	1	3
4	Brazil	0	0	2	2
5	Great Britain	0	0	1	1
Totals (5 entries)		4	4	4	12

=== Medalists ===
Event	Gold	Silver	Bronze
Men's park	Keegan Palmer; Australia	Tom Schaar; United States	Augusto Akio; Brazil
Men's street	Yuto Horigome; Japan	Jagger Eaton; United States	Nyjah Huston; United States
Women's park	Arisa Trew; Australia	Kokona Hiraki; Japan	Sky Brown; Great Britain
Women's street	Coco Yoshizawa; Japan	Liz Akama; Japan	Rayssa Leal; Brazil

== See also ==
- Roller sports at the 2023 Pan American Games
