= Isadora Rodrigues Pacheco =

Brazilian skateboarder (born 2005)

Isadora Pacheco
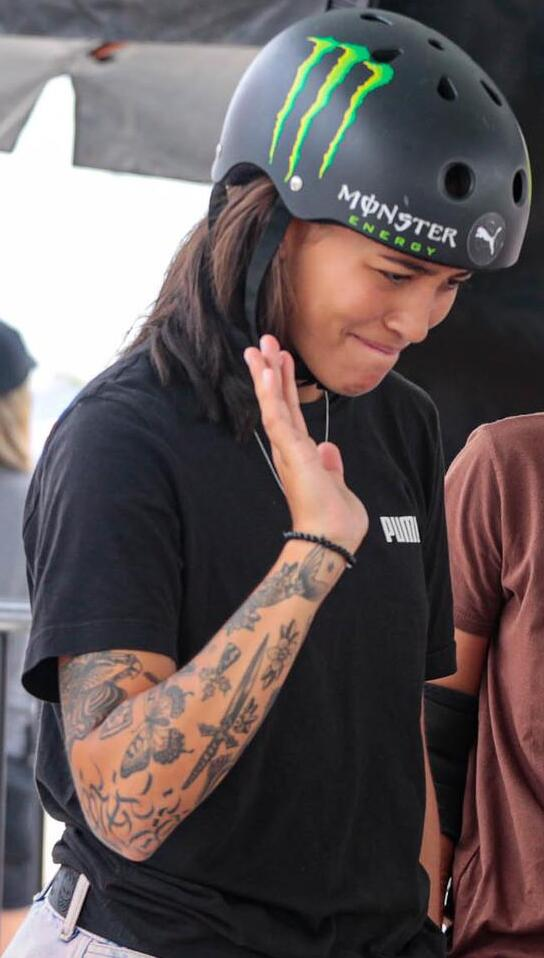
- Pacheco in 2025

Personal information
- Full name: Isadora Rodrigues Pacheco
- Nickname: Isa
- Born: 29 March 2005 (age 21) Florianópolis, Brazil
- Occupation: Professional skateboarder

Sport
- Country: Brazil
- Sport: Skateboarding
- Position: Regular footed
- Rank: 11th (June 2020)
- Event: Park
- Turned pro: 2021

Isadora Rodrigues Pacheco (born 29 March 2005) is a Brazilian professional skateboarder. She has competed in women's park events at several World Skateboarding Championships, finishing eighth in 2018 and seventh in 2019.

Pacheco qualified to compete at the 2020 Summer Olympics in Tokyo through her position at eleventh in the Olympic World Skateboarding Rankings for women's park. In the inaugural Olympic women's park event, she placed tenth overall.

She competed in the women's park events at several World Skateboarding Championships, finishing eighth in 2018 and seventh in 2019. Her coach is Miguel Catarina.

== Sports career ==
Isadora lives in Florianópolis, in the Rio Tavares neighborhood, which has many skate parks. At the age of five, she chose a skateboard as her birthday present.

She made her debut on the world circuit at the age of 11. She was the runner-up in the under-14 world category and a finalist at the 2018 World Championships in China. In 2019, she won the Brazilian national title in the park discipline, defeating Dora Varella and Yndiara Asp.

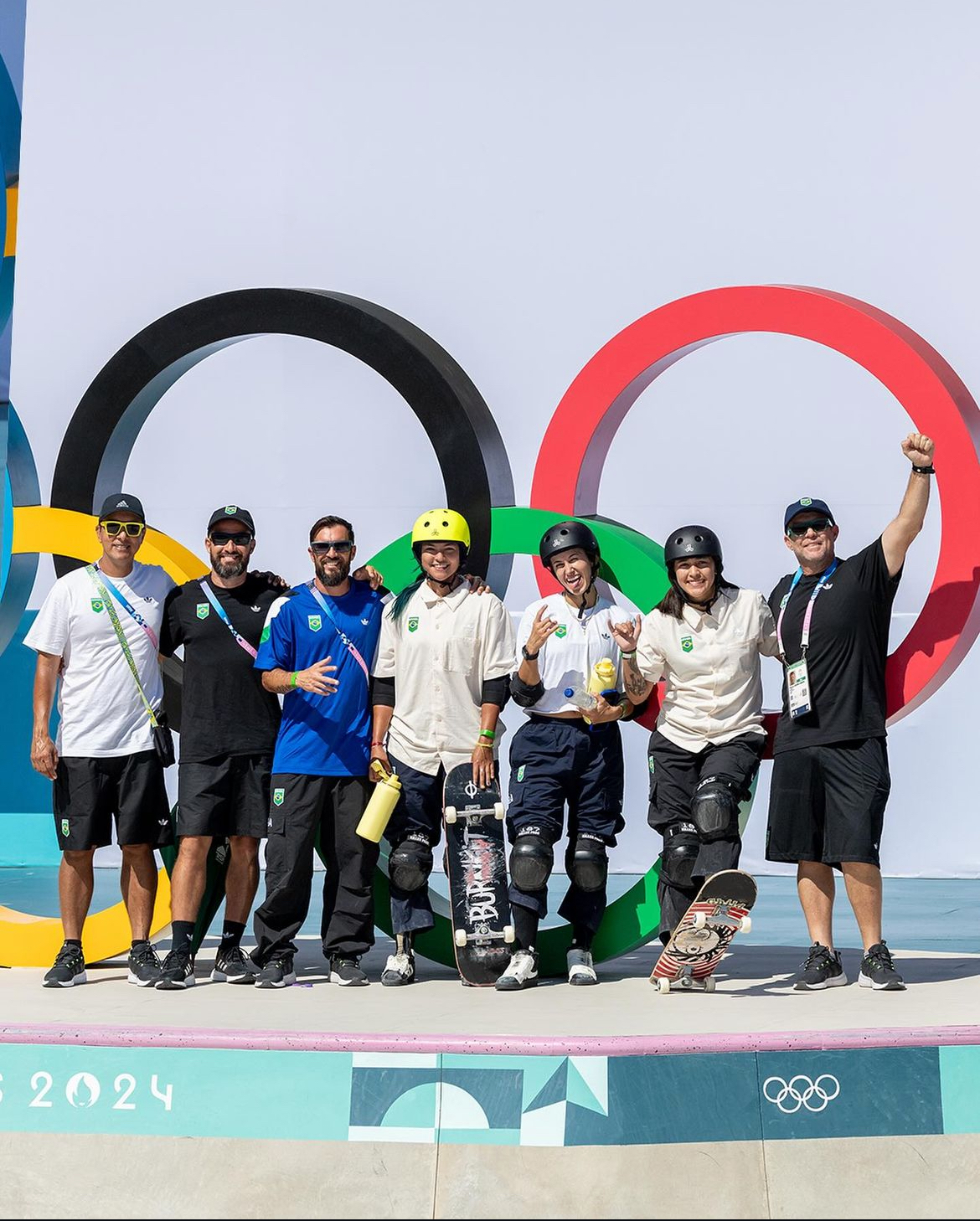
Pacheco (second from right to left) with the Brazilian women's skate park team at the 2024 Summer Olympics in Paris

== Titles ==
- 2014 – 1st place – Brazilian Children's Bowl Championship
- 2015 – 3rd place – Women's Bowl Championship
- 2016 – 1st place – Brazilian Bowl Championship
- 2016 – 1st place – Brazilian Skatepark Championship
- 2016 – 15th place – Amateur Girls 15 & Under Bowl World Ranking
- 2017 – 2nd place – Bowl Championship
- 2017 – 3rd place – Skatepark Championship
- 2017 – 2nd place – Amateur Girls 14 & Under Bowl World Ranking
