= Zheng Haohao =

Chinese park skateboarder (born 2012)

Personal information
- Native name: 郑好好
- Born: 11 August 2012 (age 13) Huizhou, Guangdong, China
- Occupation: Professional skateboarder

Sport
- Country: China
- Sport: Skateboarding
- Event: Park
- Club: Huizhou, Guangdong Province

Zheng Haohao (Chinese: 郑好好; pinyin: Zhèng Hǎohǎo; born 11 August 2012) is a Chinese park skateboarder. At age 11, she was chosen for the 2024 Summer Olympics, making her the youngest-ever Chinese Olympian.

== Early life ==
Zheng was born in 2012 in Huizhou, China to a family of Korean ethnicity. She began practicing skateboarding at age 7 after it was recommended by a friend. In July 2024, she graduated from Jinshan Lake Primary School in Huizhou. Her English language nickname is Lilibet.

== Career ==
In 2020, Zheng joined the Huizhou skateboarding team and started her skateboarding career. In September 2021 at the 2021 National Games of China, she represented Guangdong in the women's bowl pool skateboarding event. In 2022, she won the championship in the women's skateboarding group B bowl pool finals of the 16th Guangdong Provincial Games.

On 19 March 2023, at the 2022 Guangdong-Hong Kong-Macao Greater Bay Area Skateboard Open, Zheng won the first place in the women's bowl pool skateboarding event. In May of the same year, she participated in the World Skateboarding Tour in San Juan, Argentina, but was eliminated in the qualifying round. On 4 June, in the bowl and pool final of the 2023 China Skateboarding Open in Lishui, Zheng won the gold medal with 32.20 points. In August 2023, at the 2022 National Roller Skating Championships, she won first place in the women's bowl pool skateboarding with a score of 30.27. On 4 November, in the women's skateboarding bowl final of the 1st National Youth Games in Nanning, China, she placed second with 64.68 points. From 2 to 3 December, at the 2023 Guangdong Youth Skateboarding Championship, she won the gold medal in the skateboarding bowl event.

On 16 May 2024, in the women's bowl skateboarding preliminaries of the 2024 Summer Olympics qualification series in Shanghai, Zheng scored 51.73 points, ranking her 20th among 44 contestants. On 24 June, following her performance at the women's bowl skateboarding event at the 2024 Summer Olympics qualifying series in Budapest, she qualified to take part in the Olympics. On 1 July, she was chosen for the Chinese national skateboarding team for the 2024 Summer Olympics at the age of 11, making her the youngest Chinese sportsperson in history to participate in the Olympics. In the preliminary contest on 6 August, Zheng scored 63.19 points, and was eliminated in the first round.

On April 12th, 2026, at the inaugural Asian Skateboarding Championships in Meishan, China, Zheng Haohao won bronze in the Women's Park final with a score of 83.50 points on her second attempt, her best run so far in her career. Finishing behind gold medalist Meng Lingyan and silver medalist Zou Mingke, resulting in a full podium sweep by the Chinese National Skateboarding Team in Women's Park.
