= Hayden Barton =

Australian rugby league footballer (born 2004)

Personal information
- Born: 10 July 2004 (age 22) Randwick, New South Wales, Australia
- Height: 188 cm (6 ft 2 in)
- Weight: 92 kg (14 st 7 lb)

Playing information
- Position: Second-row
Club
| Years | Team | Pld | T | G | FG | P |
|---|---|---|---|---|---|---|
| 2026 | Sydney Roosters | 1 | 0 | 0 | 0 | 0 |
- Source: RLP

Hayden Barton (born 10 July 2004) is an Australian rugby league footballer for the Sydney Roosters in the National Rugby League (NRL).

== Early life ==
Born in Sydney, Barton played junior rugby league for the Mascot juniors and Bondi United.

== Career ==
A second-rower, Barton started out in the Harold Matthews Cup with the Roosters. He won the club's Coach's Award for his performances in the 2023 SG Ball Cup and progressed to the Jersey Flegg Cup side the following year. In 2025, Barton gained regular selection for the Roosters in the NSW Cup, making 20 appearances.

Barton made his first-grade debut for the Roosters in the 2026 NRL season as one of a slew of additions to the side for their final round fixture against South Sydney at Allianz Stadium, where he was utilised off the bench.
