= Madeleine Larcheron =

French skateboarder (born 2006)

Personal information
- Nationality: French
- Born: 24 January 2006 (age 20) Paris, France

Sport
- Country: France
- Sport: Skateboarding
- Position: Goofy-footed
- Rank: 22nd (June 2021)
- Event: Park

Achievements and titles
- Regional finals: 2019 Vans Park Series Europa Regionals: Women's park – 4th
- National finals: 2019 Championat De France De Skateboard: Women's bowl – Silver; 2021 French Skateboarding Championships: Women's park – Gold

Madeleine Larcheron (born 24 January 2006) is a French skateboarder and the reigning French National Champion in women's park skateboarding. She competed in the World Skateboarding Championship in 2019, finishing 22nd.

Larcheron is set to compete in the women's park event at the 2020 Summer Olympics in Tokyo.

== Sponsors ==
The following companies sponsor Larcheron's skateboarding:

- Buzzz Skateshop
- Element Skateboards
- Triple8
- Vans
- Volcom
- 187 Killer Pads
