= Lola Tambling =

British skateboarder

- Tambling at Concrete Waves skatepark, Newquay, UK

Personal information
- Citizenship: British
- Born: 28 February 2008 (age 18) Cornwall, United Kingdom
- Home town: Saltash, United Kingdom

Sport
- Country: Great Britain
- Sport: Skateboarding
- Rank: 3rd
- Event: Park

Lola Tambling (born 23 February 2008) is a British skateboarder. She is the reigning 2025 British national champion in the women's park discipline, and was previously the 2022 and 2024 champion. She competed in the women's park event at the 2024 Olympic Games in Paris.

== Early life ==
Tambling is from Saltash in Cornwall, United Kingdom. Her parents are Martyn Tambling, a builder, and Stephanie Tambling. She became interested in skateboarding at the age of seven when her parents opened a skatepark. Seeing her father, a professional BMX rider, do tricks on his bike inspired her to do the same on her skateboard.

== Career ==
Tambling learned new skateboarding tricks from social media. In 2022 she became the British national skateboarding champion.

In 2023, she placed 6th at the Skateboarding World Championships in Sharjah. Her teammate, Tokyo 2020 Olympic medallist Sky Brown, won the event. Their placements in this event qualified them both for the 2024 Olympic Games.

Tambling and Brown were joined on the British Olympic skateboarding team by multiple X Games medallist Andy Macdonald. Both Tambling and Brown were 16 at the Games, while Macdonald was 51. Tambling and Brown were among the youngest members of Team GB at the 2024 Olympics. Tambling placed 15th overall in the preliminary round with a high score of 73.85 and, due to only the top eight qualifying, did not advance to the finals.

On 13 October 2024, Tambling won the British national championship for a second time.

On 17 August 2025, Tambling retained her national championship, making her a three-time British champion.
