= Zhang Xin (skateboarder) =

Chinese skateboarder

Personal information
- Native name: 张鑫 (Chinese)
- Nickname: Asta
- Nationality: Chinese
- Born: 1 December 1998 (age 27) Xiangtan, China
- Education: Nanjing Sport Institute
- Occupation: Skateboarder

Sport
- Country: China
- Sport: Skateboarding
- Position: Regular-footed
- Rank: 21st (June 2021)
- Event: Park
- Club: Nanjing Skateboarding Team

Zhang Xin (simplified Chinese: 张鑫; traditional Chinese: 張鑫; Western name: Asta Xin Zhang; born 1 December 1998) is a Chinese skateboarder. She has competed in women's park events at several World Skateboarding Championships, finishing 19th in 2018 and 25th in 2019.

Zhang placed fifteenth in the preliminary round of the women's park event at the 2021 Tokyo Olympics.
