= Sky Brown =

British-Japanese actress

Sky Brown スカイ・ブラウン
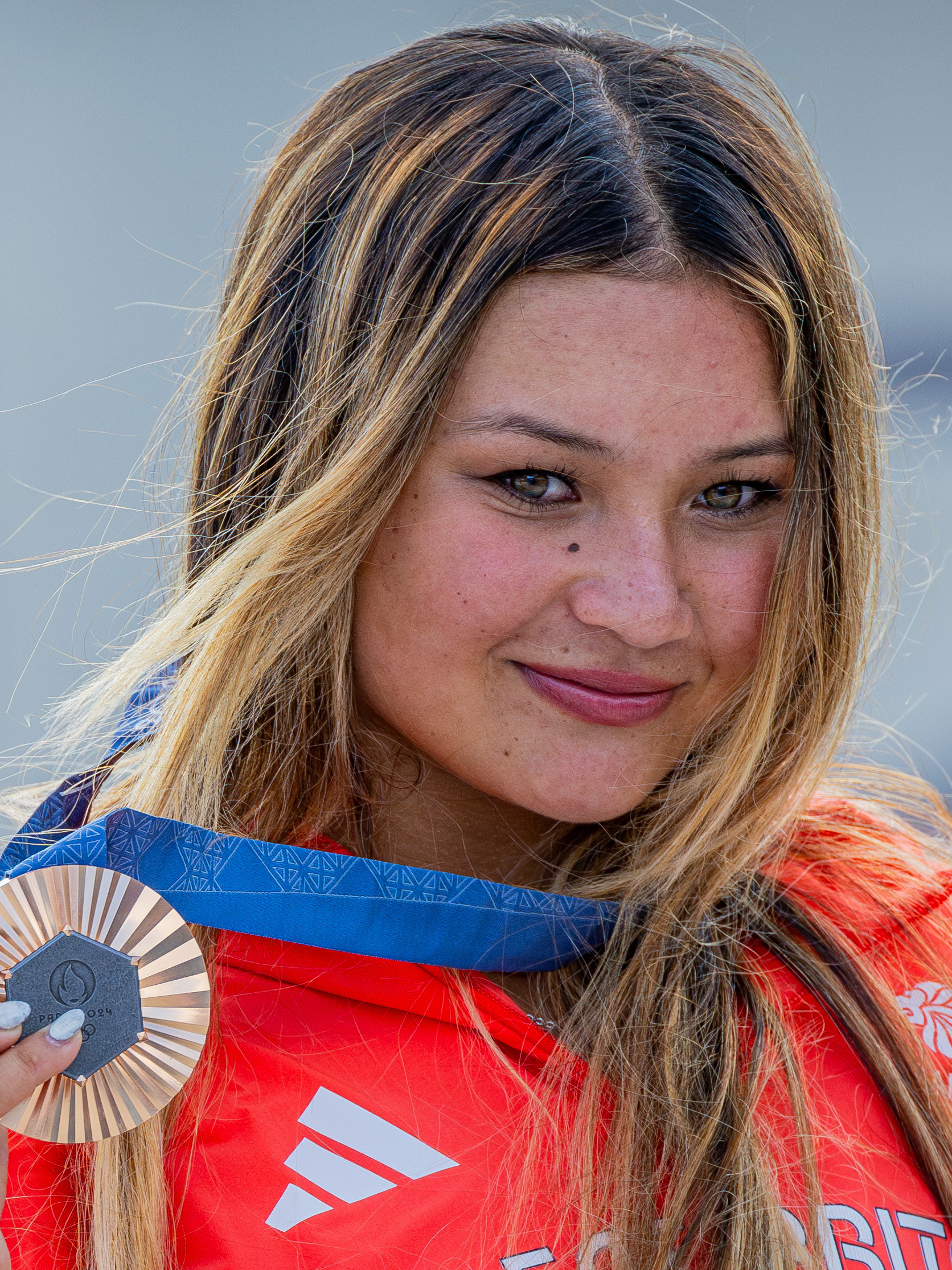
- Brown at the 2024 Summer Olympics

Personal information
- Born: 7 July 2008 (age 18) Miyazaki, Japan
- Years active: 2016–present

Japanese name
- Kanji: ブラウン 澄海
- Kana: ブラウン スカイ

Sport
- Country: Great Britain
- Sport: Skateboarding
- Position: Goofy footed
- Rank: 4th (2024)
- Event: Park
Medal record
Women's park skateboarding
Representing Great Britain
Olympic Games
Bronze medal – third place	2020 Tokyo	Park
Bronze medal – third place	2024 Paris	Park
World Championships
Bronze medal – third place	2019 São Paulo	Park
Gold medal – first place	2023 Sharjah	Park
Gold medal – first place	2025 São Paulo	Park
Silver medal – second place	2026 Rome	Park
X Games
Gold medal – first place	2021 California	Park
Gold medal – first place	2022 California	Park
Gold medal – first place	2026 Chiba	Park
Silver medal – second place	2024 Chiba	Park
Silver medal – second place	2026 Sacramento	Park
Dew Tour
Silver medal – second place	2021 Des Moines	Park
Gold medal – first place	2022 Des Moines	Park

Sky Brown (スカイ・ブラウン, Sukai Buraun; born 7 July 2008) is a British-Japanese actress, professional skateboarder and surfer who competes for Great Britain. She was the youngest professional skateboarder in the world, and has also won the American TV programme Dancing with the Stars: Juniors. She represented Great Britain at the 2020 Summer Olympics, where she won a bronze medal in the park skateboarding event, making her the country's youngest-ever medallist. She repeated this feat by winning bronze for a second time in park at the 2024 Summer Olympics. In addition, she won the same event at the 2023 and 2025 World Skateboarding Championship.

== Early life ==
Sky Brown was born in Miyazaki, Japan. Her mother, Mieko, is Japanese, and her father, Stuart, is British. She has a younger brother, Ocean Brown. In Japanese, her given name is written in katakana as スカイ (Sukai) or in kanji as 澄海 (Sukai); as is standard for Japanese surnames of foreign origin, her family name is written only in katakana.

Her British father lived in the United States for several years before moving to Japan. Brown lives in Miyazaki, but spends around half the year in the US. Her family are skateboarders, and her preschool had a skate park. She has a skating ramp in her back garden, as there are no skate parks in her home area of Takanabe, Miyazaki. In addition to skateboarding, Brown also surfs.

== Skateboarding career ==
Brown does not have a skateboarding coach; instead she learns tricks from YouTube. She sometimes practises with Shaun White, who won Olympic snowboarding medals.

=== 2016–2017: Early competitions ===
In 2016, at the age of 8, Brown took part in the Vans US Open, making her the youngest person ever to compete at the event. She fell off her skateboard in the heat. In 2017, she came second in the Asian Continental Finals, and she finished in the top 10 of the 2018 Vans Park Series.

=== 2018: Turning professional ===
In 2018, at the age of 10, Brown became a professional athlete, making her the youngest professional skateboarder in the world. The same year, she won the US TV show Dancing with the Stars: Juniors.

=== 2019: Competing for Team GB ===
In February 2019, she won the Simple Session event in Tallinn, Estonia.

In March 2019, Brown announced that she would compete for Great Britain, having previously said that she would compete for Japan. She said that she favoured the "more relaxed approach" of the British Skateboarding Association. She was one of five Britons awarded funding from UK Sport that year as they worked to qualify for the skateboarding events at the 2020 Summer Olympics, the first time the sport was included in the Games.

In 2019, Brown placed 3rd in the park event at the 2019 World Skateboarding Championship in São Paulo and became the first female to land a frontside 540 at the X Games. She finished 5th at the X Games skateboarding event.

=== 2020: Training injury ===
On 28 May 2020, while training in California, she suffered a "horrific" fall from a halfpipe ramp which left her with several skull fractures and a broken left wrist and hand. She was flown to a hospital and was reported as being unresponsive on arrival. Her father said afterwards that she was "lucky to be alive", whilst Brown herself said it was her worst fall yet. Nevertheless, she remained determined to push boundaries and compete for gold at the Tokyo Olympics.

=== 2021: X Games gold and Tokyo Olympics bronze ===
In July 2021, she won the X Games women's skateboarding park gold medal.

Brown represented Great Britain in skateboarding at the pandemic-delayed 2020 Summer Olympics in August 2021. Brown was the youngest British Summer Olympian ever, at the age of 13, beating Margery Hinton who was 13 years and 43 days when she competed in the 200 metre breaststroke event at the 1928 Summer Olympics. Brown was not the youngest competitor at the Games — Syrian table tennis player Hend Zaza and Japanese skateboarder Cocona Hiraki were younger.

Brown won the bronze medal in the women's park skateboarding event at the 2020 Summer Olympics and became Great Britain’s youngest ever medal winner, at the age of 13 years and 28 days. She fell in her first two runs at the event and scored 56.47 in her final attempt. Brown was not the youngest medallist at the Games, as 12-year-old Cocona Hiraki of Japan won silver in the same event.

In late 2021, it was announced that some of Brown's skateboards would be displayed at the renovated Young V&A in London.

=== 2022–2023 ===
In 2022, Brown retained her X Games title, and also won the Dew Tour event for the second year in a row. She won the park event at the World Skateboarding Championship in 2023, becoming the first British skateboarding world champion.

=== 2024: Paris Olympics bronze ===
In June 2024, Brown qualified for the park event at the 2024 Summer Olympics in Paris. She joined a team that consisted of 2022 British Champion Lola Tambling and 22-time Summer X Games medallist Andy Macdonald. This team was not only notable for their individual records, but also in the skaters' age gap, with both Tambling and Brown being 16 and Macdonald being 51 years old at the time of competing.

=== 2026: Rome World Cup silver ===
In June 2026, Brown came in second at World Skate Tour World Cup event in Rome losing to Japan's Mizuho Hasegawa after leading the finals until the final "Golden Run" with three runs scoring above a 90.

== Surfing career ==
In April 2021, Brown said that she was also considering trying to compete in surfing at the delayed 2020 Summer Olympics, though she ultimately only competed in skateboarding.

In March 2024, she competed at the ISA World Surfing Games in Puerto Rico, in hopes of qualifying to compete in surfing at the 2024 Summer Olympics, in addition to skateboarding, but was not successful in doing so after placing 3rd in her repechage heat. She did however finish 17th of the 113 female competitors and was the highest placed British athlete across both genders.

== Awards ==
On 19 December 2021, Brown won the 2021 BBC Young Sports Personality of the Year award; she was shortlisted again in 2022 and 2024. In April 2022, she won the Comeback of the Year award for 2021 at the Laureus World Sports Awards.

== Sponsorships ==
In 2019, Brown became the youngest-ever Nike-sponsored athlete in the world. She has featured in a Nike campaign alongside Serena Williams and Simone Biles. She is also supported by Almost Skateboards and Skateistan.

== Competition history ==
=== International competitions ===
Representing Great Britain
Year	Competition	Venue	Rank	Event	Notes
2019	World Championship	São Paulo, Brazil	3rd place, bronze medalist(s)	Park	—N/a
2021	Summer Olympics	Tokyo, Japan	3rd place, bronze medalist(s)	Park	—N/a
2023	World Championship	Sharjah, UAE	1st place, gold medalist(s)	Park	—N/a
2024	Summer Olympics	Paris, France	3rd place, bronze medalist(s)	Park	—N/a
2025	World Championship	São Paulo, Brazil	1st place, gold medalist(s)	Park	—N/a

=== Skateboarding contests ===
Year	Competition	Venue	Rank	Event	Notes
2019	X Games	Minneapolis, US	5	Park	—N/a
2021	Dew Tour	Des Moines, US	2nd place, silver medalist(s)	Park	—N/a
2021	X Games	Southern California, US	1st place, gold medalist(s)	Park	—N/a
2022	X Games	Southern California, US	1st place, gold medalist(s)	Park	—N/a
2022	Dew Tour	Des Moines, US	1st place, gold medalist(s)	Park	—N/a

== Filmography ==
Year	Title	Role	Notes
2018	Dancing with the Stars: Juniors	Herself	Contestant; winner
2019	Mani	Jade	Main role (season 4)
2020	The Drew Barrymore Show	Herself	Episode: "Tom Green, Tabitha Brown"
2020	Polly Pocket	Herself (voice)	2 episodes
2021	Attaway General	Jade	Episode: "Difference Of Opinion"
2022	The Tiny Chef Show	Herself	Episode: "Snap Pea Stir Fry"
2022	Hell's Kitchen: Battle of the Ages	Herself	Episode: "Clawing Their Way to the Top"
2025	Sneaks	Sky (voice)	

== See also ==
- Great Britain at the Olympics
- List of multi-sport athletes
