= Poppy Starr Olsen =

Australian professional skateboarder

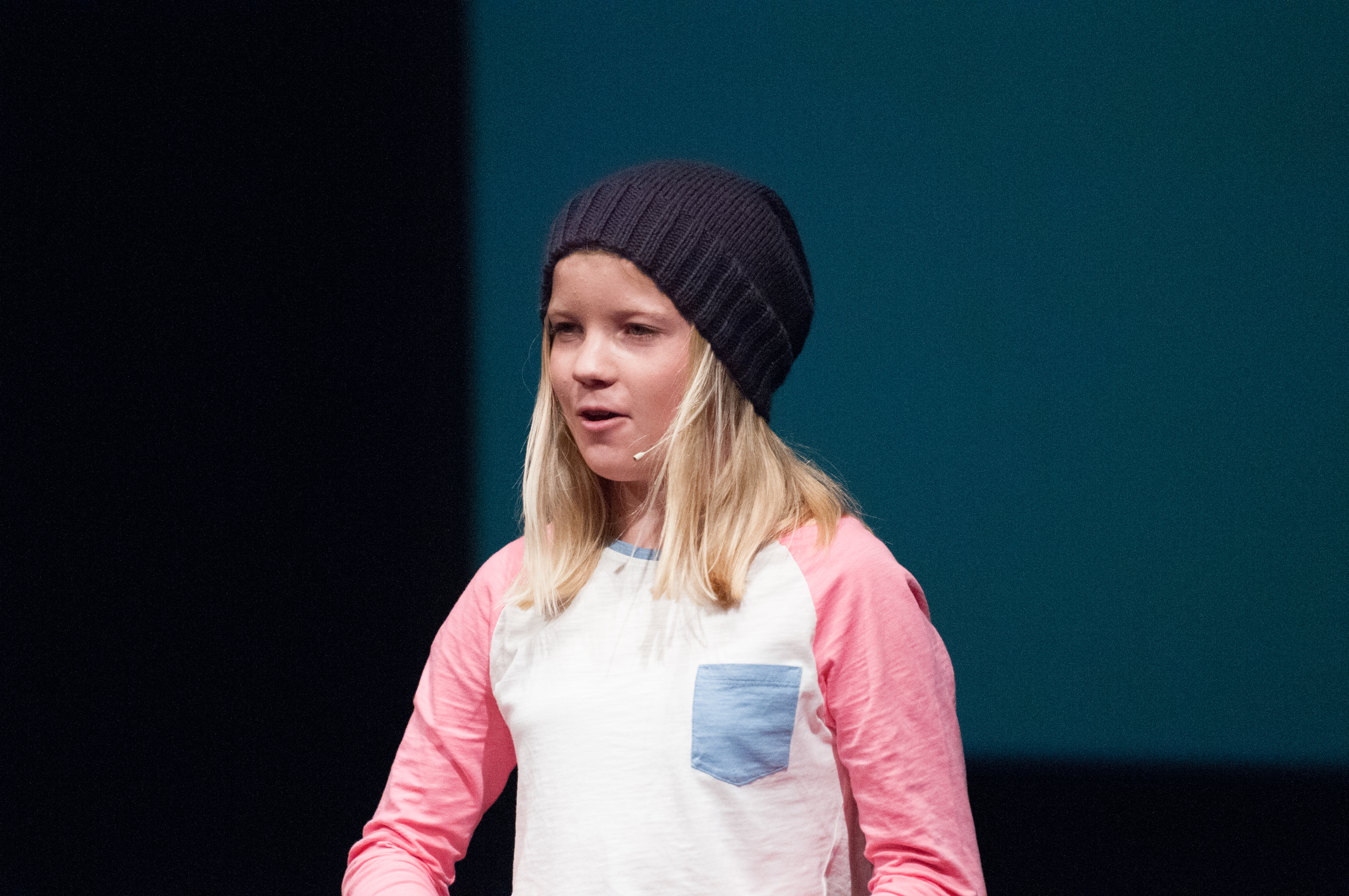
- Olsen speaking at TEDx Ultimo in 2014

Personal information
- Nationality: Australian
- Born: 1 June 2000 (age 26) Sydney, Australia
- Occupation: Professional skateboarder
- Website: poppystarr.com

Sport
- Country: Australia
- Sport: Skateboarding
- Position: Regular-footed
- Rank: 4th (June 2021)
- Events: Park, bowl

Achievements and titles
- Olympic finals: 2020 Summer Olympics: Women's park – 5th
- Regional finals: 2019 Vans Park Series Oceania Regionals: Women's park – Gold
- National finals: 2019 Skate Australia National Park Championships: Women's park – Gold; 2020 Skate Australia National Park Championships: Women's park – Gold
Medal record
Women's park skateboarding
Representing Australia
World Championships
Bronze medal – third place	2018 Nanjing	Park
X Games
Bronze medal – third place	2017 Minneapolis

Poppy Starr Olsen (born 1 June 2000) is an Australian regular-footed professional skateboarder.

== Skateboarding career ==
Olsen became world champion in the over-14 age group in 2014 and in the over-15 age group in 2015. In 2016, she won the professional division of the Vans Combi Classic and became the first female Australian to compete in the Summer X Games.

Olsen qualified for and competed in the X Games Minneapolis 2017, taking out a bronze medal in women's park.

In July 2021, Olsen was named as part of Australia's inaugural Olympic skateboarding team to compete at the 2020 Summer Olympics in Tokyo. She competed in the Skateboarding at the 2020 Summer Olympics – Women's park. She came sixth in the Preliminary Heats and therefore competed in the final. She finished fifth. Full details are in Australia at the 2020 Summer Olympics.
