= Julia Benedetti =

Spanish skateboarder

Julia Benedetti González (born 25 September 2004 in A Coruña) is a Spanish skateboarder. She has competed in women's park events at several World Skate Championships, finishing 26th in 2018 and 14th in 2019.

She competed in the women's park event at the 2020 Tokyo Olympics finishing 16th.
