= Fay De Fazio Ebert =

Canadian skateboarder (born 2009)

Fay DeFazio Ebert
Personal information
- Nickname: Fay All Day
- National team: Canada
- Born: November 19, 2009 (age 17) Toronto, Ontario, Canada
- Years active: 2021-present

Sport
- Country: Canada
- Sport: Skateboarding
- Position: Regular-footed
- Rank: 24th (Park; October 2023)
- Event: Park
- Coached by: Adam Higgins
Medal record
Women's skateboarding
Representing Canada
Pan American Games
Gold medal – first place	2023 Santiago	Park skateboarding

Fay DeFazio Ebert (born November 19, 2009) is a Canadian skateboarder. She is the youngest member of Canada's national skateboard team, for which she qualified at age 11 and is the reigning Pan American Games champion in the park event, winning gold in Santiago in 2023.

In August 2024, Fay De Fazio Ebert finished 20th in the preliminary round of the women's park event at the Paris Olympics.

== Sporting career ==
Ebert qualified for the Canadian national team in 2020, hoping to make a spot on the 2020 Summer Olympics team competing in Tokyo; she did not make the team for that event, but may be competing at the 2024 Summer Olympics in Paris as part of the Canadian park skateboarding team. If she does, she would be the youngest athlete to compete for Canada at the Olympics since Barbara Hounsell in 1964.

She practices four hours a day, usually six days a week.

Ebert represented Canada at the World Skate Olympic qualifier and participated in the 2019 skateboard world championships in Brazil; she was the youngest competitor at the event. On June 26, 2024, Ebert was named to Canada's 2024 Olympic team.

== Personal life ==
Ebert was born in the Toronto area and picked up the sport at age 8, during a March Break event held at a local skate club. She was immediately interested, getting her first skateboard the same day of the event and has been training weekly since then. Her parents are interactive game designers, living in the Toronto area. Saying she enjoys pressure, she admitted to the Toronto Star that the prospect of starting the ninth grade and high school was more daunting than competing in the Olympics. During her spare time, she enjoys art, playing her ukulele, and Minecraft.

Ebert earned the nickname "Fay All Day" from fellow skateboarders as she "can skate all day".
