= Lilly Stoephasius =

German skateboarder (born 2007)

Personal information
- Born: 5 June 2007 (age 19) Berlin, Germany
- Occupation: Professional skateboarder

Sport
- Country: Germany
- Sport: Skateboarding
- Rank: 17th
- Event: Park
- Club: 1. Berliner Skateboardverein
- Coached by: Oliver Stoephasius
Medal record
Women's skateboarding
Representing Germany
World Championships
Bronze medal – third place	2022 Buenos Aires	Vert

Lilly Stoephasius (born 5 June 2007) is a German skateboarder. She is a three-time German Champion in women's park skateboarding and represented Germany in the inaugural women's park event at the 2020 Summer Olympics.

== Skateboarding career ==
As soon as she could stand, Stoephasius' father put her on a skateboard. She was gifted a skateboard of her own at age three and began training once a week at age five. By 2018, her training regimen had increased to three or four times a week. Stoephasius skates for the 1. Berliner Skateboardverein ('First Berliner Skateboard Club') and her father, Oliver, is her coach. Her younger sister, Thora, is also an active skateboarder.

At the 2018 German Skateboarding Championship in Düsseldorf, Stoephasius became the German Champion in the women's park discipline at the age of eleven, a feat she repeated the following year. She competed extensively in 2019, most notably in July at the World Skate Vert Skateboarding World Championship in São Paulo, where she placed third, and in August at the Vans Park Series Europa Regionals in Chelles, France, where she won silver. Other competitions in 2019 included the World Skate Park Skateboarding World Championships in September, where she placed fifteenth, and the World Skate Oi STU Open in November, where she placed seventeenth.

As far back as November 2018, Stoephasius had set a goal to qualify for the 2020 Summer Olympics in Tokyo, where skateboarding would be included in the Olympic program for the first time. In 2021, she became German Champion in women's park for the third time. At the Dew Tour Women's Park Open in Des Moines, Iowa in May 2021, she qualified as the youngest German athlete to ever debut at the Olympic Games. In September 2019, among the top thirty ranked women's park skaters, nine would have been under the age of 14 at the originally scheduled date of the 2020 Summer Olympics.

== Miscellaneous ==
Stoephasius attends the Evangelische Schule Charlottenburg in Berlin. In 2019, Christoph Biemann filmed a segment for the bi-annual television quiz-show Frag doch mal die Maus ('Ask the Mouse') with Stoephasius' class after she submitted the question “If all of the students came to school by skateboard or bicycle or other CO_{2}-free method, how much CO_{2} could the sixth class save?" to the program.
