= Heili Sirviö =

Finnish-Australian skateboarder

Personal information
- Citizenship: Australian
- Born: 17 March 2011 (age 15) Finland

Sport
- Country: Finland
- Sport: Park skateboarding
- Rank: 16th
Medal record
Women's skateboarding
Representing Finland
X Games
Gold medal – first place	2025 Salt Lake City	Park
Bronze medal – third place	2024 Chiba	Park
Bronze medal – third place	2026 Chiba	Park

Heili Sirviö (born 17 March 2011) is a Finnish-Australian skateboarder. She represented Finland at the 2024 Summer Olympics in the women's park event.

== Early life and career ==
Sirviö was born in Finland. She moved to Australia with her family in 2016 and later received Australian citizenship. Her family later relocated to Los Angeles, California to provide her with better training opportunities.

Her journey into skateboarding began during the COVID-19 pandemic while she was living in Australia, where she discovered the sport as a way to alleviate boredom.

=== 2024 Summer Olympics ===
On 6 August 2024, she represented Finland at the 2024 Summer Olympics in the park event, making her the youngest Finn to ever participate in the Olympics at the age of 13. She finished 5th with a score of 88.89, falling short of her first Olympic medal podium.
