= Dora Varella =

Brazilian skateboarder

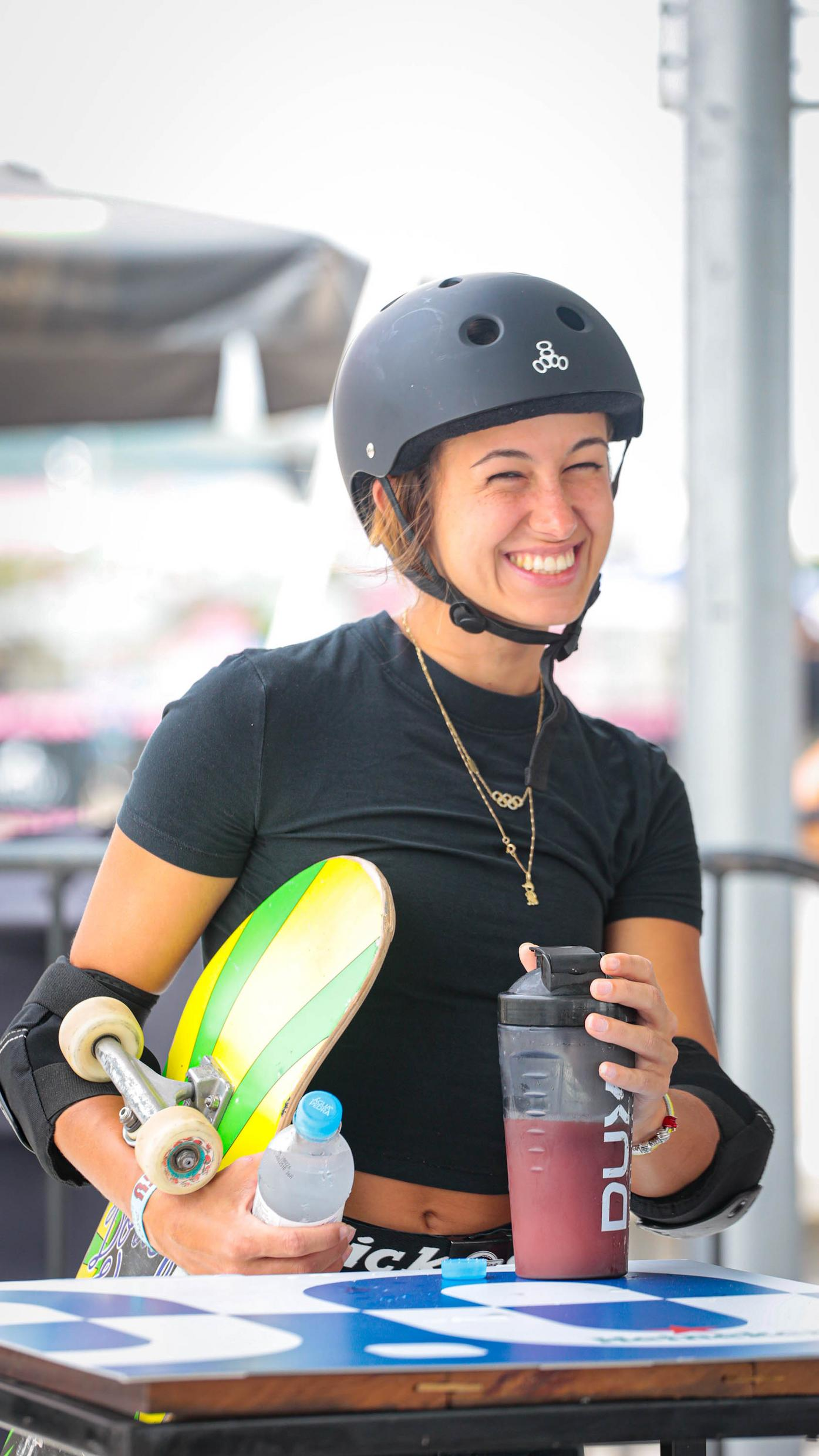
- Dora Varella in 2025

Personal information
- Full name: Dora Varella Gallacci Pereira
- Born: Dora Varella Gallacci Pereira; 31 July 2001 (age 25) São Paulo, Brazil
- Home town: São Paulo, Brazil
- Occupation: Professional skateboarder
- Website: doravarella.com.br (in Portuguese)

Sport
- Country: Brazil
- Sport: Skateboarding
- Position: Regular footed
- Rank: 9th (June 2021)
- Event: Park
- Turned pro: 2019
- Coached by: Edgard Pereira and Ítalo Penarrubia

Achievements and titles
- Olympic finals: 2020 Summer Olympics: Women's park – 7th 2024 Summer Olympics: Women's park – 4th

Dora Varella Gallacci Pereira (born 31 July 2001) is a Brazilian professional skateboarder. She has competed in women's park events at several World Skateboarding Championships, finishing 15th in 2018 and sixth in 2019.

== Early life ==
Varella began participating in the sport at the age of 10, after watching one of her cousins practise and asking her parents for a skateboard of her own. In January 2019, aged 17, she became a professional athlete affiliated with the Brazilian Confederation of Skateboarding.

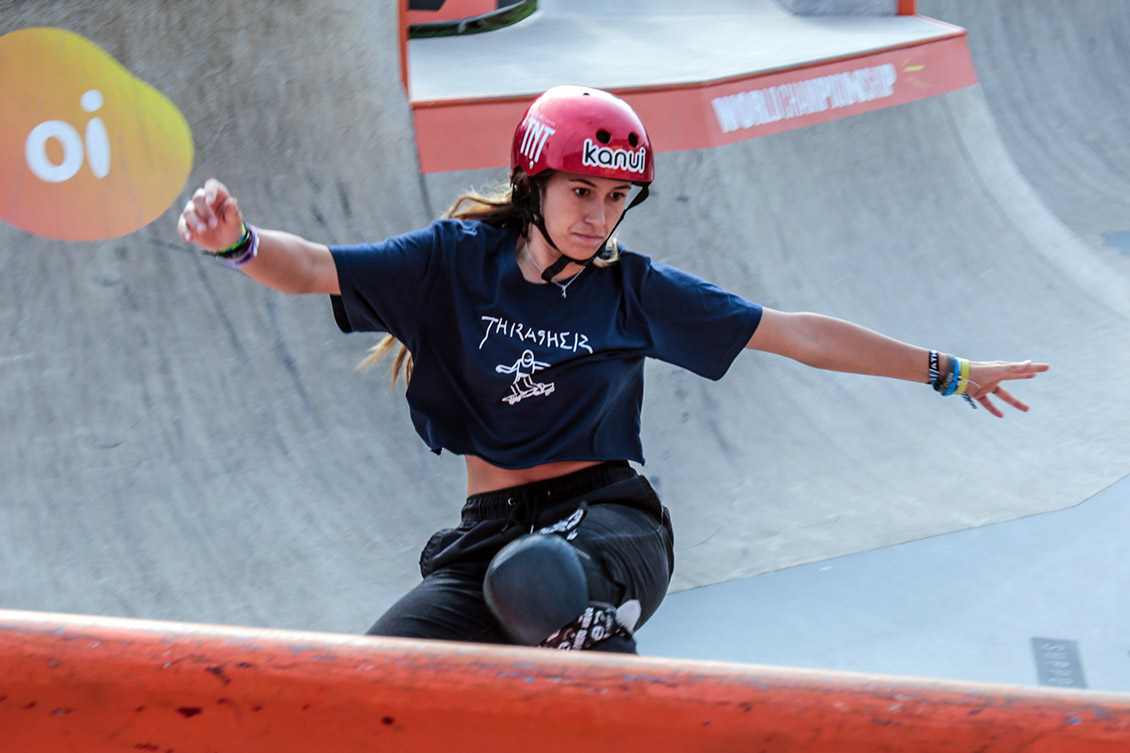
Dora Varella in 2019

== Career ==
=== 2016 ===
In 2016, Varella received the first invitation of her career to compete at the X Games.

=== 2021: Olympic debut ===
After the last Olympic qualifying championship held in Des Moines, Iowa, United States, in May 2021, Dora Varella officially qualified for the Tokyo 2020 Olympic Games.

Varella participated in the women's park event at the 2021 Tokyo Olympics, finishing seventh in the finals. Heading into the games, she ranked ninth in the Olympic World Skateboarding Rankings for women's park.

=== 2024 ===
Returning in the 2024 Paris Olympics, she finished fourth in the finals.

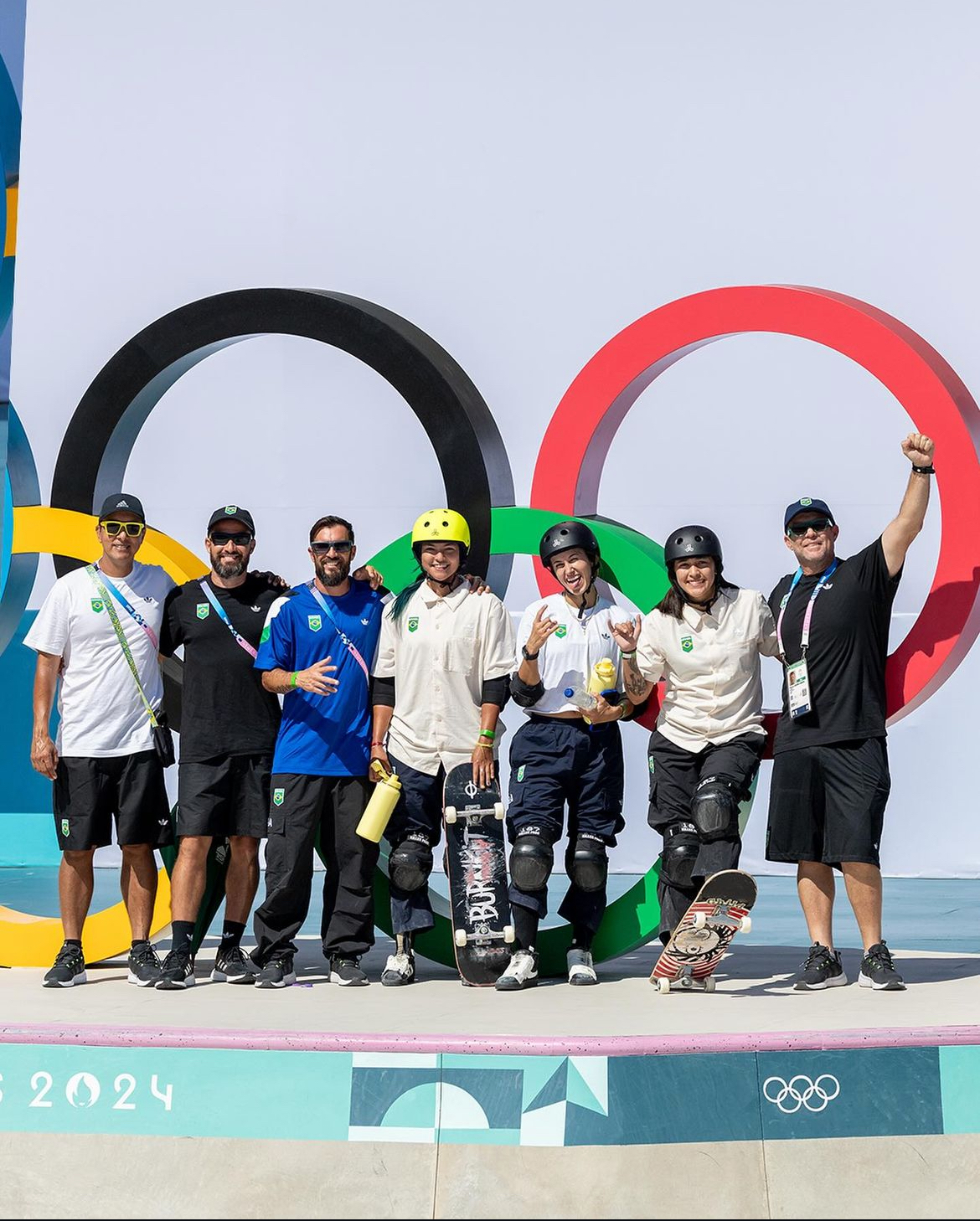
Varella (third from right to left) with the Brazilian women's skate park team at the 2024 Summer Olympics in Paris

=== 2025 ===
In November, Varella won the women’s title of the 2025 Mini Ramp Pro Attack in her hometown of São Paulo, with a final score of 86,45.

=== 2026 ===
In March, Varella competed at the 2025 world skateboarding championship, which had been postponed from the previous year and happened in her hometown of São Paulo. She finished her participation in ninth place in the semifinals, just short of qualifying for the final, with a score of 72.25, while the eighth qualified skateboarder, Japanese Hiraki Cocona, scored 72.44.

== Achievements ==
=== National ===
- Brazilian Bowl Championship – CBSK (2015)
- Vans Park Series Women's National Championships – Brazil (2017)
- Brazilian Park Championship (2020)
- STU National – Brazil (2021)
- STU National – Criciúma (2023)

=== International ===
- Girls Vans Combi Pool Classic – USA: category 14 & under (2016)
- Girls Vans Combi Pool Classic – USA: category 15 & over (2017 & 2018)
- STU Open Rio (2023)

=== Pan American ===
- Vans Park Series Women's Continental Championships – United States (2017 and 2018)
