= Yndiara Asp =

Brazilian skateboarder (born 1997)

Personal information
- Nickname: Yndi
- Born: 19 October 1997 (age 27); Florianópolis, Brazil
- Occupation: Professional skateboarder

Sport
- Country: Brazil
- Sport: Skateboarding
- Position: Goofy-footed
- Rank: 14th (June 2021)
- Event: Park

Achievements and titles
- Olympic finals: 2020 Summer Olympics: Women's park – 8th

Yndiara Asp (born 19 October 1997) is a Brazilian professional skateboarder, who represented Brazil in the 2021 Tokyo Olympics.

== Early life ==
Born in Santa Catarina, Yndiara began skateboarding at the age of 7, and started to pursue competitive events in the age of 15. She studied Physical education in the Federal University of Santa Catarina, but opted to drop out to pursue skateboarding professionally.

== Skateboarding ==
Yndiara has competed in women's park events at several World Skateboarding Championships, finishing 10th in 2018 and 36th in 2019. She has also competed at X Games, placing 4th in 2018.

She is placed eighth in the women's park event at the 2021 Tokyo Olympics, the first that featured skateboarding as an official sport.
