= Cocona Hiraki =

Japanese skateboarder (born 2008)

Personal information
- Born: 26 August 2008 (age 17) Kutchan, Hokkaido, Japan
- Home town: Tomakomai, Hokkaido, Japan
- Occupation: Skateboarder
- Years active: 2019–present

Japanese name
- Kanji: 開 心那
- Hiragana: ひらき ここな

Sport
- Country: Japan
- Sport: Skateboarding
- Position: Regular-footed
- Rank: 1st (February 2025)
- Event: Park
- Club: Hot Bowl Skate Park (Sapporo)

Achievements and titles
- Olympic finals: 2020 Summer Olympics: Women's park – Silver
- World finals: World Skateboarding Championship 2023: Women's park – Gold
- National finals: 3rd Japan National Skateboarding Championships 2019: Women's park – Gold
Medal record
Women's park skateboarding
Representing Japan
Olympic Games
Silver medal – second place	2020 Tokyo	Park
Silver medal – second place	2024 Paris	Park
World Championships
Gold medal – first place	2023 Ostia	Park
Silver medal – second place	2022 Sharjah	Park
X Games
Gold medal – first place	2023 Chiba	Park
Silver medal – second place	2019 Minneapolis	Park
Silver medal – second place	2022 Chiba	Park
Silver medal – second place	2025 Salt Lake City	Park
Bronze medal – third place	2022 California	Park
Dew Tour
Bronze medal – third place	2019 Long Beach	Park
Bronze medal – third place	2022 Des Moines	Park

Cocona Hiraki (開心那, Hiraki Kokona; also Kokona Hiraki, born 26 August 2008) is a Japanese skateboarder. She won a silver medal in the women's park event at the 2020 Tokyo Olympics, becoming the youngest Japanese athlete on record to participate in the Summer Olympic Games. She won a silver medal again in the women's park event at the 2024 Paris Olympics.

== Career ==
Hiraki began skateboarding at age 5. At age 9, she placed fourth in the women's park event at the 2nd Japan National Skateboarding Championships in May 2018, and participated in her first international event, the Vans Park Series Asia Continental Championship in August 2018, at which she placed first.

Hiraki made her global competition debut at age 10, finishing seventh in the women's event at the 2018 Park World Championship (also called the World Skate Tour (WST) Park World Championship) of the World Skateboarding Championship in Nanjing. Eight months later, she won silver in women's park at the X Games Minneapolis 2019 to become the youngest X Games medalist in history. She earned her first first-place finish on the global circuit at the Vans Park Series (VPS) Paris in 2019, several weeks before her eleventh birthday.

At the 2019 edition of the Park World Championship in São Paulo, she finished outside of the women's finals in eleventh place. Despite falling outside of the medal table at the 2021 Dew Tour in Des Moines, Iowa, US, Hiraki's fifth place finish at the event earned placement at sixth on World Skate's World Skateboarding Ranking and qualified her for the 2020 Summer Olympics.

Hiraki made history as Japan's youngest Summer Olympic Games participant and medalist when she won silver at the inaugural Olympic women's park event at the 2020 Summer Olympics in Tokyo on 4 August 2021.

During 2022, she won silver at the X Games Chiba 2022 in Chiba, Japan on 23 April, bronze at the X Games 2022 in Vista, California, US on 23 July, and bronze at the 2022 Dew Tour in Des Moines, Iowa, US on 30 July. and

Hiraki earned podium placement at five of the six qualification events for the 2024 Summer Olympics. Her results included a fifth-place finish at the World Skateboarding Tour (WST) Stop San Juan Park in San Juan, Argentina during May 2023, a third-place finish at the Olympic Qualification Series (OQS) Budapest in Budapest, Hungary during June 2024, and second place finishes at WST Park Dubai in Dubai, UAE during March 2024 and OQS Shanghai in Shanghai, China during May 2024. The highlights of her qualification events were a silver medal at the Park World Championships Sharjah 2022 in Sharjah, UAE on 13 February 2023 and a gold medal victory at the WST Park World Championship 2023 in Ostia, Rome, Italy on 8 October 2023.

At the X Games Chiba 2023, she won gold on the merits of her elimination round results after organizers cancelled the finals due to inclement weather in the form of incessant rain.

In June 2024, Hiraki was first on World Skate's World Skateboarding Ranking for women's park.

== Records ==
As of August 2024, Hiraki holds the following records:

- youngest person to medal in two different Summer Olympic Games – 15 years, 11 months, 9 days

- youngest person to win two silvers in two different Summer Olympic Games

- youngest X Games medalist – 10 years, 11 months, 7 days
- youngest Japanese athlete to participate in the Summer Olympic Games – 12 years, 9 months, 9 days

- youngest Japanese athlete to medal at the Summer Olympic Games
