= Chester Yacht Club =

Canadian yacht club in Nova Scotia

Coordinates: 44°32′11″N 64°14′31″W

- Founded: 1902
- Location: Chester, Nova Scotia
- Commodore: Jennifer Chandler
- Focus: Host to Chester Race Week and Opti Jam regatta Home to IOD and Bluenose fleets
- Website: chesteryachtclub.ca

Chester Yacht Club (CYC) is a private yacht club located in Chester, Nova Scotia, Canada, established in 1902. The Chester Yacht Club is home to Canada's largest keelboat regatta, Chester Race Week, which occurs every August. Notable members of the Chester Yacht Club include Olympians Jacob Saunders and Graeme Saunders, who started sailing with the club's junior sailing school in 2002, and philanthropist Sir Christopher Ondaatje, who owns a nearby island. The club is also active in one-design racing, highlighted by the Bluenose one-design sloop and International One Design (IOD) fleet.

== History ==
Although the first documented regatta in Chester took place in 1856, the first race that was "officially sanctioned" by the Chester Yacht Club was in 1901. After the CYC was incorporated in 1902, it became the hub for yacht racing in Chester. According to club historian Claudette Sapp, a brochure for the Hackmatack Inn from 1903 claimed that boats from Halifax, Yarmouth, Sydney, and Digby yacht clubs took part during Regatta Week.

In the early years, the CYC provided part-time employment for skilled boatmen from Big Tancook Island, relying extensively on professional skippers rather than amateurs or "Corinthians". A major figure in raising the profile and prestige of the Chester Yacht Club in those years was boat builder Amos Stevens, who developed an international reputation for his carvel and schooner building. Another prominent boat builder who produced many of CYC's "finest yachts" was Stevens's son-in-law and competitor, Reuben Heisler; his son, Benjamin Heisler, went on to launch the small-sized "Chester C-class" around 1936, and enabled the club to win many trophies into the 1960s.

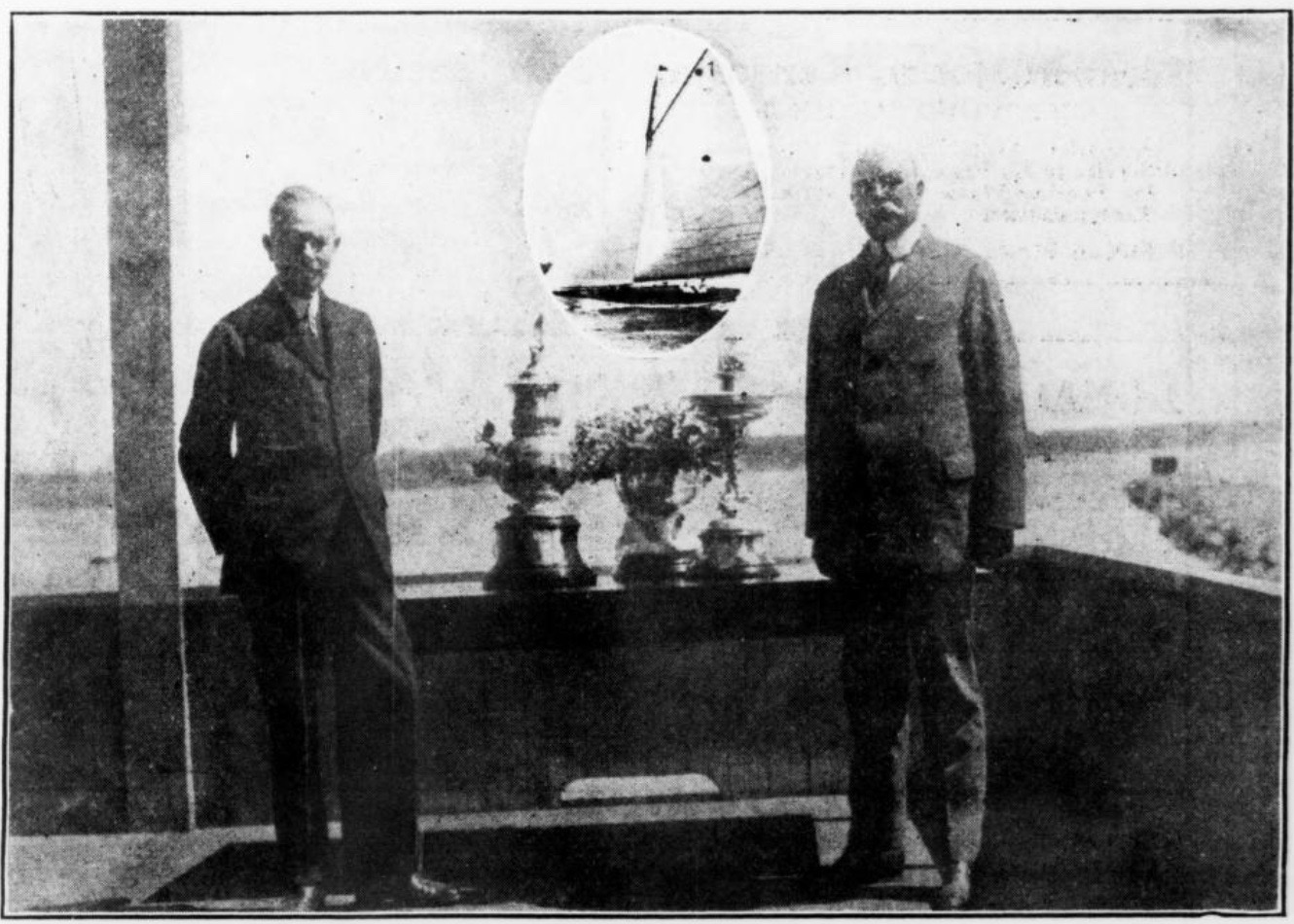
Lord Byng, governor general of Canada, with Chester Yacht Club's former Commodore J. Kemp Barlett and the three trophies won by the Dixie (inset) in 1923

During the 1920s, the Chester Yacht Club was very successful in racing, and developed an intense rivalry with the Royal Nova Scotia Yacht Squadron (RNSYS). One of the most prominent figures in CYC racing during this period was General J. Kemp Bartlett of Baltimore, Maryland, who served as commodore of the Chester Yacht Club. In 1923, Bartlett's sloop, the Dixie, won the Coronation Cup on Mahone Bay; the Wenonah Cup on Halifax Bay; and the Prince of Wales Cup, which it won again in 1924. In 1926, the first woman in history to win the Prince of Wales Cup was Mrs. Charles Stewart Wurts of Philadelphia, whose boat, the Hayseed IV, crossed the finish line in Halifax while flying the colors of the CYC. By 1928, the CYC had acquired the property it continues to use today, including the club house and wharf. In 1931, former Commodore Bartlett donated a cannon, which the Chester Yacht Club used for 70 years, and which 87-year-old Ben Heisler fired to start off Chester Race Week in 1994.

After World War II, the Chester Yacht Club made a concerted effort to promote the "Race Week" regatta, securing participation from the two Halifax yacht clubs and the Lunenburg Yacht Club. The CYC received its liquor license in 1952, expanded the club house, and hired cooks and bartenders, allowing it to entertain more visitors during racing events. The club house underwent a major renovation in 1968 and restoration in 2006. In 2013, club member Christopher Ondaatje wrote in Canadian Geographic that the Chester Yacht Club was a "cauldron of summer activity", hosting "lobster feasts and chicken roasts", in addition to Race Week and the junior sailing school.

== Junior sailing school ==
In the 1950s, the club encouraged junior sailors to helm both model yachts and the Bluenose. During the summer, the Chester Yacht Club sponsored a weekly model sailing derby for children. Each week, between 12 and 20 junior yachtsmen set their own sails and followed their model yachts in rowboats, under the supervision of a senior member of the Chester Yacht Club. In 1956, The Ottawa Citizen commented on the "international flavour" of CYC's model yacht race, due to the large number of American families who had summer homes in Chester. The club hired a sailing instructor and started the sailing school in 1966. More recently, CYC's Junior Sailing has offered Wet Feet and CANSail programs for Optimist and 420 dinghies.

In 2002, future Olympians Jacob and Graeme Saunders enrolled in the Chester Yacht Club junior sailing program. Ahead of the 2016 Summer Olympics, their first boat, the Green Dragon, was still docked at the CYC. In 2022, the Saunders brothers launched the Dinghy Locker Initiative together with the Chester Yacht Club to support young sailors in need. The program encourages donations of old sailing gear to bring down barriers to the sport and help families with limited resources to spend on equipment.

== Chester Race Week ==
By the 1960s, fibreglass boats increasingly replaced traditional wooden boats, fundamentally changing the "race courses, rating systems, trophies and classes of racing yachts", but Chester Race Week remained the highlight of the racing season for CYC. In the 1960s and 1970s, up to 140 boats gathered for the annual regatta. In 1991, the Montreal Gazette called it "the biggest regatta in the Maritimes."

The Chronicle Herald noted in 2012 that although most vessels at Chester Race Week were from Nova Scotia, New Brunswick and Prince Edward Island were typically well represented, with additional entries from Quebec, Newfoundland and Labrador, Saint Pierre and Miquelon, and New England. In 2013, The Globe and Mail reported that 130 boats from across North America were expected to compete in Chester Race Week, which the CYC billed as "Canada's largest keelboat regatta." During Race Week, Chester Yacht Club has been open to members of the public, who can watch the races from inside the club or from the dock.

== International competitions ==
In 2001, the Chester Yacht Club had five 29er skiffs competing in the qualifying races for the 29er World Championship held in Portsmouth Olympic Harbour. The Kingston Whig-Standard in Ontario noted that while CYC coach Greg Guthrie was keen to promote the 29er skiff, which had not yet been widely adopted in Canada, among the club's young sailors, the teens were also aware that they were "a little behind in the experience and the talent level that countries such as New Zealand and Great Britain have reached in the 29er."

In June 2009, the Chester Yacht Club IOD fleet placed seventh in the IOD World Championships in Sweden. By the 2011 season, the club had ten boats in its all-wood IOD fleet, which was founded by captain Rick Thompson.

In 2016, brothers Jacob and Graeme Saunders competed in the men's 470 event at the Summer Olympics in Rio de Janeiro, finishing in 22nd place. The CBC reported that "Chester Yacht Club is where the brothers call home", noting that they named the two-person dinghy they used to compete in the Olympics "Chester". In 2021, Jacob Saunders competed again in the 470 event at the 2020 Summer Olympics in Tokyo, together with Oliver Bone of RNSYS, placing 17th.

== Notable members ==
- Myra Freeman, former lieutenant governor of Nova Scotia
- Christopher Ondaatje, OC, CBE, businessman, philanthropist, adventurer
- Jacob Saunders, sailor in the 2016 Summer Olympics, men's 470 event, and the 2020 Summer Olympics, who is also a member of the Royal Nova Scotia Yacht Squadron
- Graeme Saunders, sailor in the 2016 Summer Olympics, men's 470 event
- Jim Spatz, businessman, philanthropist
