= Anton Dahlberg =

Swedish sailor (born 1985)

Personal information
- Full name: Anton Carl Diderik Dahlberg
- Nationality: Swedish
- Born: 10 May 1985 (age 41) Växjö, Sweden
- Height: 1.76 m (5 ft 9 in)
- Weight: 63 kg (139 lb)

Sport

Sailing career
- Class: 470
- Club: Royal Swedish Yacht Club
- Coach: Per Frykholm
Medal record
Men's sailing
Representing Sweden
Olympic Games
Silver medal – second place	2020 Tokyo	470
Bronze medal – third place	2024 Paris	470 mixed
World Championships
Gold medal – first place	2021 Vilamoura	470
Silver medal – second place	2017 Thessaloniki	470
Bronze medal – third place	2019 Enoshima	470
European Championships
Gold medal – first place	2018 Burgas	470
Gold medal – first place	2019 Sanremo	470
Gold medal – first place	2022 Çeşme	Mixed 470
Gold medal – first place	2023 Sanremo	Mixed 470

Anton Carl Diderik Dahlberg (born 10 May 1985) is a Swedish sailor, who specializes in the 470 class, a two-person dinghy. He has represented Sweden, along with his partner Sebastian Östling, in two editions of the Olympic Games (2008 and 2012), and with Fredrik Bergström in 2016 and 2020, winning an Olympic silver in 2020, and with Lovisa Karlsson in 2024, winning an Olympic bronze medal. He has been representing the Royal Swedish Yacht Club throughout most of his career.

Throughout his career he has been coached by Per Frykholm and Viktor Bergström.

== Sailing career ==
=== Early years ===
Dahlberg, born in Växjö, started sailing in Växjö Kappseglingsklubb on Helgasjön. He sailed the Optimist dinghy and finished 6th in both the 1999 and the 2000 Optimist World Championship, as well as fourth with the Swedish team in the team event at the 1999 edition. In 2000, he was a awarded the Gedda Trophy for the Swedish Junior Sailor of the Year by the Swedish Sailing Federation.

=== First two Olympic 470 campaigns, with Östling (2007–2012) ===
Anton Dahlberg and Sebastian Östling had gone to the same riksidrottsgymnasium, but started to sail together first when they both were studying at the Stockholm School of Economics. Dahlberg and Östling finished 35th out of 112 in the men's 470 event at the 2007 ISAF Sailing World Championships in Cascais, taking in a bullet in the first race of the opening series.

Dahlberg made his Olympic debut at the 2008 Summer Olympics in Beijing, together with crew member Östling in the men's 470 event class. The Swedish duo finished 15th in a ten-round opening series with a net score of 111, trailing Israelis Gideon Kliger and Udi Gal by a narrow, three-point gap in the final standings.

Dahlberg qualified to compete for the second time as a helmsman in the men's 470 class at the Olympics by finishing eleventh and receiving a nation spot at the ISAF World Championships in Perth, Western Australia. Teaming again with Östling in the opening series, the Swedish duo achieved four top 10 finishes to guarantee a spot in the final race, but fell short for the podium with an accumulated net score of 123 points and a tenth-place finish in a fleet of twenty-seven boats.

=== 470 Olympic silver medal with Bergström (2013–2021) ===
After the 2012 Summer Olympics, Dahlberg instead joined forces with former 470 Junior World Championship champion Fredrik Bergström for a 2016 Summer Olympics campaign. The two finished second in the 2014 Trofeo Princesa Sofía. At the 2014 ISAF Sailing World Championships in Santander, they finished 15th.

In November 2015, Dahlberg and Bergström were among the first batch of athletes selected by the Swedish Olympic Committee to represent Sweden at the 2016 Summer Olympics in Rio de Janeiro. At the Olympics, with a fourth place possible before the medal race, the Swedish duo finished sixth.

At the 2017 470 World Championships in Thessaloniki, Dahlberg and Bergström were in the lead before the medal race on the last day, ahead of Australian team Mathew Belcher and Will Ryan. Believing they were on the course side of the starting line at the time of the starting signal, they went back to start again and lost the race and the World championship title. In May 2018, they won the 470 European Championships in Burgas. The year after they defended their European Championship title in Sanremo in May.

At the 2021 470 World Championships in Vilamoura in March 2021, the Dahlberg and Bergström team won their first World championship title, ahead of Portuguese silver medallists Diogo Costa and Pedro Costa and Spanish bronze-medallist team Jordi Xammar and Nicolás Rodríguez.

Dahlberg and Bergström represented Sweden in the men's 470 event at the 2020 Olympics. On the first day of the Olympic regatta in Enoshima, the Swedish duo won the first race and finished 15th in the second. In the end of the series, Dahlberg and Bergström had taken the silver medal after securing the second place in the medal race ahead of Spanish duo Xammar and Rodríguez, who took the bronze. The Australian duo Belcher and Ryan claimed the gold medal.

=== Mixed 470 with Karlsson (since 2022) ===
After the 2020 Summer Olympics and the end of the men's 470 event in the Olympics, Dahlberg teamed up with Lovisa Karlsson, who had sailed in the women's event in the same Olympics, to campaign for the 2024 Summer Olympics. They made their first regatta together in the 2022 Semaine Olympique Française in Hyères, which they won.

In September 2022, Dahlberg and Karlsson won the 470 European Championships in Çeşme, Turkey. At the 2022 470 World Championship in Sdot Yam a month later, they finished 13th and therefore not qualified for the medal race.

Dahlberg and Karlsson successfully defended their 470 European Championships title in May 2023 in Sanremo, one point ahead of German crew Anna Markfort and Simon Diesch.

At the 2024 Olympic sailing event in Marseille, Dahlberg and Karlsson were sitting fourth ahead of the medal race in the event, and overtook Spain to win the bronze medal.

== Personal life ==
Anton Dahlberg is the son of Peder Dahlberg, who has won several Swedish championship titles in the 22m² Skerry cruiser class. Anton Dahlberg is married to Danish sailor and coach Alberte Lindberg, with whom he has one child, and lives in Klagshamn.

== Achievements ==
As of 27 September 2015

Year	Competition	Venue	Position	Event
1999	Optimist World Championships	Martinique, France	6th	Optimist class
1999	Optimist World Championships	Martinique, France	4th	Team racing
2000	Optimist World Championships	A Coruña, Spain	6th	Optimist class
2007	ISAF Sailing World Championships	Cascais, Portugal	35th	470 class
2008	470 World Championships	Melbourne, Australia	51st	470 class
2008	Olympic Games	Qingdao, China	15th	470 class
2009	470 World Championships	Rungsted, Denmark	24th	470 class
2010	470 World Championships	The Hague, the Netherlands	14th	470 class
2011	ISAF Sailing World Championships	Perth, Australia	11th	470 class
2012	Olympic Games	Weymouth and Portland, UK	10th	470 class
2013	470 World Championships	La Rochelle, France	20th	470 class
2014	ISAF Sailing World Championships	Santander, Spain	15th	470 class
