= Jacob Saunders =

Canadian sailor

Personal information
- Born: April 15, 1992 (age 34) Halifax, Nova Scotia, Canada
- Height: 176 cm (5 ft 9 in)

Sailing career
- Sport: Sailing
- Club: Chester Yacht Club; Royal Nova Scotia Yacht Squadron
- Class: 470

Achievements and titles
- Olympic finals: 2016 Summer Olympics; 2020 Summer Olympics

Jacob Saunders (born April 15, 1992) is a Canadian sailor. Along with his partner (and brother) Graeme Saunders, he competed at the 2016 Summer Olympics in the 470 event, finishing in 22nd place. He represented Canada at the 2020 Summer Olympics together with Oliver Bone of the Royal Nova Scotia Yacht Squadron, finishing in 17th place in the men's 470 event. He started his early training and career with the Chester Yacht Club, competing as Jacob Chaplin-Saunders.

== Early life and youth career ==
Saunders started sailing in the junior sailing program at Chester Yacht Club in 2002, along with his brother. He began competitive sailing at the age of 11, in the Optimist and 420 classes, and won two national titles in each. In 2007, he finished in second place out of 60 dinghies in the Optimist fleet at the Canadian Olympic-training regatta in Kingston, and was awarded the Bergeron-Rushton trophy as the top Canadian. At the age of 16, he began training in the 420 class with former Olympian Oliver Bone as his coach, and competed at the 2009 Youth Sailing World Championships in Brazil.

== International career ==
Jacob Saunders has competed in two Olympics as skipper in a two-person 470 class dinghy

Jacob started teaming up with his older brother Graeme in 2009. In 2011, they started competing in the 470 class, with Jacob at the helm as skipper and Graeme as crew, and participated in the 2011 Junior World Championships.

In January 2016, the Saunders brothers finished seventh at the Sailing World Cup in Miami. Placing second in the medal race, they qualified Canada for the men's 470 event at that year's Summer Olympics, but had to continue competing for their individual spots on Team Canada. At the world championships a few weeks later, they finished in 32nd place for the second straight year.

On June 3, 2016, the Saunders were named to Canada's Olympic Sailing team. The next day, they flew to the UK to take part in the Sail for Gold regatta in Weymouth. At the 2016 Olympics in Rio de Janeiro, they placed 22nd in the men's 470 event.

In 2017, Jacob competed at Chester Race Week, helming Dark 'n' Stormy to a first-place overall finish in the Bluenose class, with Erin Creaser on jib and David Mosher on main.

After a three-year hiatus from sailing to finish his engineering degree, Jacob was approached by his former coach and former Olympian Oliver Bone, and started training with him in the fall of 2019.

In January 2020, Saunders and Bone competed together for the first time at the Hempel World Cup Series in Miami. On the second day of the regatta, they missed two races due to catastrophic gear failure. Due to strong winds, their shroud snapped, the mast came down, and their mast partners were destroyed, requiring them to be towed after the first race. Nevertheless, they continued racing in the regatta using borrowed spare equipment, and earned a spot for Canada at the Olympics in the 470 event.

Saunders was about to leave for Spain to join Bone in competing in the 2020 470 World Championship in Spain, when their events were canceled due to the COVID-19 pandemic. After lockdown was lifted, they resumed training for nine to ten hours a week, sailing out of the Royal Nova Scotia Yacht Squadron in Halifax. They were later named to Canada's Olympic Sailing team in March 2021.

When racing resumed, Saunders and Bone competed at the 470 Class Open European Championships in Portugal in May 2021. They were coached for the Tokyo Olympics by Paralympic triple medallist Paul Tingley. Saunders and Bone finished in 17th place at the 2020 Summer Olympics, which took place in 2021.

== Honours and education ==
The Saunders brothers received Sail Canada's Nathan Cowan Memorial Award for Developing Sailors in 2012, and the Marvin McDill Memorial Award for the Canadian Sailing Team's Rookie of the Year in 2013.

Jacob Saunders earned a bachelor of engineering degree from Dalhousie University in 2019. In 2022, he told Sail Canada that he was retired from competitive sailing, but that he and his brother were working with the Chester Yacht Club to launch a "Dinghy Locker Initiative" to help young sailors in need.
