= Spain at the 2020 Summer Olympics =

- IOC code: ESP
- NOC: Spanish Olympic Committee
- Website: www.coe.es (in Spanish)

in Tokyo, Japan 23 July 2021 – 8 August 2021
- Competitors: 321 in 32 sports
- Flag bearers (opening): Mireia Belmonte; Saúl Craviotto
- Flag bearer (closing): Sandra Sánchez
- Medals Ranked 22nd: Gold 3 Silver 8 Bronze 6 Total 17

Summer Olympics appearances (overview)
- 1900; 1904–1912; 1920; 1924; 1928; 1932; 1936; 1948; 1952; 1956; 1960; 1964; 1968; 1972; 1976; 1980; 1984; 1988; 1992; 1996; 2000; 2004; 2008; 2012; 2016; 2020; 2024; 2028

Spain competed at the 2020 Summer Olympics in Tokyo, originally scheduled to take place from 24 July to 9 August 2020 but postponed to 23 July to 8 August 2021 because of the COVID-19 pandemic. Since the nation's official debut in 1920, Spanish athletes have appeared in every edition of the Summer Olympic Games, with the exception of the 1936 Summer Olympics in Berlin (from which they withdrew as a boycott due the fact that the Games were to be held on the Nazi Germany) and the 1956 Summer Olympics in Melbourne, as a part of the boycott against the Soviet invasion of Hungary. Spain competed in all sports except baseball, rugby sevens, wrestling and surfing.

The nation finished the Games with 17 total medals: three gold, eight silver, and six bronze, matching the overall tally of the 2016 Olympics. Its gold medal haul dropped from 7 to 3. Two of Spain's gold medals were in sports making their Olympic debut this year: karate (Sandra Sánchez, women's kata), and sport climbing (Alberto Ginés López, men's combined).

== Medalists ==
Medal	Name	Sport	Event	Date
Gold	Alberto Fernández; Fátima Gálvez	Shooting	Mixed trap team	31 July
Gold	Sandra Sánchez	Karate	Women's kata	5 August
Gold	Alberto Ginés López	Sport climbing	Men's combined	5 August
Silver	Adriana Cerezo	Taekwondo	Women's 49 kg	24 July
Silver	Maialen Chourraut	Canoeing	Women's slalom K-1	27 July
Silver	Rayderley Zapata	Gymnastics	Men's floor	1 August
Silver	Teresa Portela	Canoeing	Women's K-1 200 metres	3 August
Silver	Damián Quintero	Karate	Men's kata	6 August
Silver	Saúl Craviotto; Marcus Walz; Carlos Arévalo; Rodrigo Germade	Canoeing	Men's K-4 500 metres	7 August
Silver	Spain women's national water polo team: Marta Bach; Anni Espar; Clara Espar; Laura Ester; Judith Forca; Maica García Godoy; Irene González; Paula Leitón; Beatriz Ortiz; Pilar Peña; Elena Ruiz; Elena Sánchez; Roser Tarragó	Water polo	Women's tournament	7 August
Silver	Spain national under-24 football team: Marco Asensio; Dani Ceballos; Marc Cucurella; Álvaro Fernández; Eric García; Bryan Gil; Óscar Gil; Pedri González; Mikel Merino; Óscar Mingueza; Rafa Mir; Juan Miranda; Jon Moncayola; Dani Olmo; Mikel Oyarzabal; Javi Puado; Unai Simón; Carlos Soler; Pau Torres; Jesús Vallejo; Iván Villar; Martín Zubimendi	Football	Men's tournament	7 August
Bronze	David Valero	Cycling	Men's cross-country	26 July
Bronze	Pablo Carreño Busta	Tennis	Men's singles	31 July
Bronze	Ana Peleteiro	Athletics	Women's triple jump	1 August
Bronze	Joan Cardona Méndez	Sailing	Men's finn	3 August
Bronze	Jordi Xammar; Nicolás Rodríguez	Sailing	Men's 470	4 August
Bronze	Spain men's national handball team: Julen Aguinagalde; Rodrigo Corrales; Alex Dujshebaev; Raúl Entrerríos; Ángel Fernández; Adrià Figueras; Antonio García Robledo; Aleix Gómez; Gedeón Guardiola; Eduardo Gurbindo; Jorge Maqueda; Viran Morros; Gonzalo Pérez de Vargas; Miguel Sánchez-Migallón; Daniel Sarmiento; Ferran Solé	Handball	Men's tournament	7 August

Medals by sport
Sport	1st place, gold medalist(s)	2nd place, silver medalist(s)	3rd place, bronze medalist(s)	Total
Athletics	0	0	1	1
Canoeing	0	3	0	3
Cycling	0	0	1	1
Football	0	1	0	1
Gymnastics	0	1	0	1
Handball	0	0	1	1
Karate	1	1	0	2
Sailing	0	0	2	2
Shooting	1	0	0	1
Sport climbing	1	0	0	1
Taekwondo	0	1	0	1
Tennis	0	0	1	1
Water polo	0	1	0	1
Total	3	8	6	17

== Competitors ==
The following is the list of number of competitors participating in the Games. Note that reserves in athletics, equestrian, field hockey, football, handball and water polo are not counted as athletes; however, expanded rosters were considered for field hockey, football, handball and water polo, following the decision of IOC to make them more flexible regarding the possible impact of COVID-19 protocols:

Sport	Men	Women	Total
Archery	1	1	2
Artistic swimming	—N/a	8	8
Athletics	32	22	54
Badminton	1	1	2
Basketball	12	12	24
Boxing	4	0	4
Canoeing	10	5	15
Cycling	9	3	12
Diving	2	0	2
Equestrian	4	1	5
Fencing	1	0	1
Field hockey	16	16	32
Football	18	0	18
Golf	2	2	4
Gymnastics	5	4	9
Handball	14	14	28
Judo	3	4	7
Karate	1	1	2
Modern pentathlon	1	0	1
Rowing	4	2	6
Sailing	8	7	15
Shooting	1	1	2
Skateboarding	2	2	4
Sport climbing	1	0	1
Swimming	4	7	11
Table tennis	1	2	3
Taekwondo	3	1	4
Tennis	4	4	8
Triathlon	3	2	5
Volleyball	2	2	4
Water polo	12	12	24
Weightlifting	3	1	4
Total	184	137	321

== Archery ==
Spain qualified two archers: one for the men's individual recurve by winning the bronze medal and securing an outright berth available at the 2019 European Games in Minsk, Belarus; and another for the women's individual recurve by earning one of the four spots available at the Europe Continental Qualification Tournament in Antalya, Turkey.

Athlete	Event	Ranking round		Round of 64	Round of 32	Round of 16	Quarterfinals	Semifinals	Final / BM	
Athlete	Event	Score	Seed	Opposition Score	Opposition Score	Opposition Score	Opposition Score	Opposition Score	Opposition Score	Rank
Daniel Castro	Men's individual	650	44	Wei C-h (TPE); L 2–6	Did not advance					
Inés de Velasco	Women's individual	628	48	Kaufhold (USA); L 3–7	Did not advance					
Daniel Castro; Inés de Velasco	Mixed team	1278	21	—N/a		Did not advance				

== Artistic swimming ==
Spain fielded a squad of eight artistic swimmers to compete across all events by winning the silver medal and securing the second of three available spots in the women's team routine at the 2021 FINA Olympic Qualification Tournament in Barcelona, Spain.

Athlete	Event	Technical routine		Free routine (preliminary)			Free routine (final)		
Athlete	Event	Points	Rank	Points	Total (technical + free)	Rank	Points	Total (technical + free)	Rank
Alisa Ozhogina; Iris Tió	Duet	86.9281	9	88.300	175.2281	11 Q	88.6667	175.5948	10
Ona Carbonell; Berta Ferreras; Meritxell Mas; Alisa Ozhogina; Paula Ramírez; Sara Saldaña; Iris Tió; Blanca Toledano	Team	90.3780	7	—N/a			91.5333	181.9113	7

== Athletics ==
Spanish athletes achieved the entry standards, either by qualifying time or by world ranking, in the following track and field events (up to a maximum of 3 athletes in each event).: Although selected, Irene Sánchez-Escribano could not compete in the 3000 m steeplechase due to a last minute injury. 2016 silver medallist Orlando Ortega got injured while training already at Japan days before the competition and could not take place.

Key

- Note–Ranks given for track events are within the athlete's heat only
- Q = Qualified for the next round
- q = Qualified for the next round as a fastest loser or, in field events, by position without achieving the qualifying target
- NR = National record
- PB = Personal best
- N/A = Round not applicable for the event
- Bye = Athlete not required to compete in round

Track & road events
Men

Athlete	Event	Heat		Semifinal		Final	
Athlete	Event	Result	Rank	Result	Rank	Result	Rank
Óscar Husillos	400 m	48.05	7	Did not advance			
Adrián Ben	800 m	1:45.30	3 Q	1:44.30	4 q	1:45.96	5
Saúl Ordóñez	800 m	1:45.98	5	Did not advance			
Pablo Sánchez-Valladares	800 m	1:46.06	4	Did not advance			
Ignacio Fontes	1500 m	3:36.95	8 q	3:34.49	5 Q	3:38.56	13
Jesús Gómez	1500 m	3:47.27	12 qR	3:44.46	12	Did not advance	
Adel Mechaal	1500 m	3:36.74	6 Q	3:32.19 PB	4 Q	3:30.77 PB	5
Mohamed Katir	5000 m	13:30.10	1 Q	—N/a		13:06.60	8
Carlos Mayo	10000 m	—N/a				28:04.71	13
Asier Martínez	110 m hurdles	13.32	1 Q	13.27 PB	3 q	13.22 PB	6
Orlando Ortega	110 m hurdles	DNS		Did not advance			
Sergio Fernández	400 m hurdles	51.51	7	Did not advance			
Daniel Arce	3000 m steeplechase	8:38:09	13	—N/a		Did not advance	
Fernando Carro	3000 m steeplechase	DNF		—N/a		Did not advance	
Sebastián Martos	3000 m steeplechase	8:23.07	8	—N/a		Did not advance	
Javier Guerra	Marathon	—N/a				2:16:42	33
Ayad Lamdassem	Marathon	—N/a				2:10:16	5
Daniel Mateo	Marathon	—N/a				2:15:21	21
Diego García	20 km walk	—N/a				1:21:57	6
Miguel Ángel López	20 km walk	—N/a				1:27.12	31
Álvaro Martín	20 km walk	—N/a				1:21:46	4
Luis Manuel Corchete	50 km walk	—N/a				DNF	
Jesús Ángel García	50 km walk	—N/a				4:10:03	35
Marc Tur	50 km walk	—N/a				3:51:08	4

Women

Athlete	Event	Heat		Semifinal		Final	
Athlete	Event	Result	Rank	Result	Rank	Result	Rank
María Isabel Pérez	100 m	11.51	5	Did not advance			
Jaël Bestué	200 m	23.19 PB	4	Did not advance			
Aauri Lorena Bokesa	400 m	51.89	4 q	51.57 PB	8	Did not advance	
Natalia Romero	800 m	2:01.16 PB	6 q	2:01.52	8	Did not advance	
Esther Guerrero	1500 m	4:07.08	8	Did not advance			
Marta Pérez	1500 m	4:04.76 PB	7 q	4:01.69 PB	5 Q	4:00.12 PB	9
Lucía Rodríguez	5000 m	15:26.19 PB	16	—N/a		Did not advance	
Teresa Errandonea	100 m hurdles	13.15	6	Did not advance			
Carolina Robles	3000 m steeplechase	9:45.37	13 qR	—N/a		9:50.96	14
Marta Galimany	Marathon	—N/a				2:35:39	37
Elena Loyo	Marathon	—N/a				2:34:38	29
Laura Méndez Esquer	Marathon	—N/a				DNF	
Laura García-Caro	20 km walk	—N/a				1:37.48	34
Raquel González	20 km walk	—N/a				1:31.57	14
María Pérez	20 km walk	—N/a				1:30.05	4

Mixed

Athlete	Event	Heat		Final	
Athlete	Event	Result	Rank	Result	Rank
Aauri Lorena Bokesa; Laura Bueno; Bernat Erta; Samuel García	4 × 400 m relay	3:13.29 NR	6	Did not advance	

Field events
Men

Athlete	Event	Heat		Final	
Athlete	Event	Result	Rank	Result	Rank
Eusebio Cáceres	Long jump	7.98	7 q	8.18	4
Pablo Torrijos	Triple jump	15.87	25	Did not advance	
Lois Maikel Martínez	Discus throw	54.69	30	Did not advance	
Odei Jainaga	Javelin throw	73.11	29	Did not advance	
Javier Cienfuegos	Hammer throw	76.91	7 q	76.30	10

Women

Athlete	Event	Heat		Final	
Athlete	Event	Result	Rank	Result	Rank
Fátima Diame	Long jump	6.33	22	Did not advance	
Ana Peleteiro	Triple jump	14.62	2 Q	14.87 NR	3rd place, bronze medalist(s)
María Belén Toimil	Shot put	17.38	22	Did not advance	
Laura Redondo	Hammer throw	62.42	29	Did not advance	

Combined events – Men's decathlon

Athlete	Event	100 m	LJ	SP	HJ	400 m	110H	DT	PV	JT	1500 m	Final	Rank
Jorge Ureña	Result	10.66 PB	7.30	13.97	2.05	48.00 PB	14.13	43.70 PB	4.90	55.82	4:27.82	8322	9
Jorge Ureña	Points	938	886	727	850	909	958	740	880	675	759	8322	9

Combined events – Women's heptathlon

Athlete	Event	100H	HJ	SP	200 m	LJ	JT	800 m	Final	Rank
María Vicente	Result	13.54	1.77 =PB	12.70	23.50	6.18	37.04	2:16.99	6117	18
María Vicente	Points	1059	941	707	1029	905	611	865	6117	18

== Badminton ==
Spain entered two badminton players (one per gender) into the Olympic tournament. 2014 Youth Olympian Clara Azurmendi, with Pablo Abián playing in the badminton court at his fourth consecutive Games on the men's side, was automatically selected among the top 40 individual shuttlers in their respective singles events. based on the BWF World Race to Tokyo Rankings. Reigning Olympic champion Carolina Marín was initially chosen but pulled out from the Games due to a knee injury.

Athlete	Event	Group stage			Elimination	Quarterfinal	Semifinal	Final / BM	
Athlete	Event	Opposition Score	Opposition Score	Rank	Opposition Score	Opposition Score	Opposition Score	Opposition Score	Rank
Pablo Abián	Men's singles	Must (EST); W (21–7, 21–11)	Chen L (CHN); L (11–21, 10–21)	2	Did not advance				
Clara Azurmendi	Women's singles	An S-y (KOR); L (13–21, 8–21)	Adesokan (NGR); W (21–10, 21–2)	2	Did not advance				

== Basketball ==
Summary

Team	Event	Group stage				Quarterfinal	Semifinal	Final / BM	
Team	Event	Opposition Score	Opposition Score	Opposition Score	Rank	Opposition Score	Opposition Score	Opposition Score	Rank
Spain men's	Men's tournament	Japan; W 88–77	Argentina; W 81–71	Slovenia; L 87–95	2 Q	United States; L 81–95	Did not advance		
Spain women's	Women's tournament	South Korea; W 73–69	Serbia; W 85–70	Canada; W 76–66	1 Q	France; L 64–67	Did not advance		

=== Men's tournament ===
Spain men's basketball team qualified for the Games by reaching the semifinal stage and securing an outright berth as one of two highest-ranked squads from Europe at the 2019 FIBA Basketball World Cup in China.

Team roster

A 16-player roster was announced on 6 July 2021. The final squad was revealed on 19 July 2021.

Spain men's national basketball team roster
Players
Coaches

Pos.	No.	Name	Age – Date of birth	Height	Club	Ctr.
SF	3	Xabier López-Arostegui	24 – 19 May 1997	2.01 m (6 ft 7 in)	Valencia	(Spain)
F/C	4	Pau Gasol	41 – 6 July 1980	2.13 m (7 ft 0 in)	Barcelona	(Spain)
G/F	5	Rudy Fernández	36 – 4 April 1985	1.96 m (6 ft 5 in)	Real Madrid	(Spain)
PG	6	Sergio Rodríguez	35 – 12 June 1986	1.91 m (6 ft 3 in)	Olimpia Milano	(Italy)
PG	9	Ricky Rubio	30 – 21 October 1990	1.93 m (6 ft 4 in)	Minnesota Timberwolves	(United States)
SF	10	Víctor Claver	32 – 30 August 1988	2.07 m (6 ft 9 in)	Valencia	(Spain)
C	13	Marc Gasol	36 – 29 January 1985	2.10 m (6 ft 11 in)	Los Angeles Lakers	(United States)
C	14	Willy Hernangómez	27 – 27 May 1994	2.09 m (6 ft 10 in)	New Orleans Pelicans	(United States)
PF	16	Usman Garuba	19 – 9 March 2002	2.03 m (6 ft 8 in)	Real Madrid	(Spain)
SF	20	Alberto Abalde	25 – 15 December 1995	2.00 m (6 ft 7 in)	Real Madrid	(Spain)
G/F	21	Álex Abrines	27 – 1 August 1993	1.98 m (6 ft 6 in)	Barcelona	(Spain)
G	23	Sergio Llull	33 – 15 November 1987	1.92 m (6 ft 4 in)	Real Madrid	(Spain)

Head coach

- (Italy) Sergio Scariolo

Assistant coach(es)

- (Spain) Luis Guil
- (Spain) Ángel Sánchez

Legend

- Club – describes last
  club before the competition
- Age – describes age
  on 25 July 2021

Group play

Pos	Team	Pld	W	L	PF	PA	PD	Pts	Qualification
1	Slovenia	3	3	0	329	268	+61	6	Quarterfinals
2	Spain	3	2	1	256	243	+13	5	Quarterfinals
3	Argentina	3	1	2	268	276	−8	4	Quarterfinals
4	Japan (H)	3	0	3	235	301	−66	3	

Source: TOCOG and FIBA
Rules for classification: 1) classification points; 2) head-to-head results; 3) head-to-head game points difference; 4) head-to-head number of game points scored.
(H) Hosts

26 July 2021
21:00
v

Boxscore

Japan	77–88	Spain
Scoring by quarter: 14–18, 14–30, 28–21, 21–19
Pts: Hachimura 20; Rebs: Watanabe 8 Asts: Baba, Tanaka 5		Pts: Rubio 20; Rebs: Claver 9 Asts: Rubio 9

Saitama Super Arena, Saitama
Referees: Aleksandar Glišić (SRB), Mārtiņš Kozlovskis (LAT), Rabah Noujaim (LIB)

29 July 2021
21:00
v

Boxscore

Spain	81–71	Argentina
Scoring by quarter: 20–25, 20–9, 21–19, 20–18
Pts: Rubio 26; Rebs: P. Gasol 8 Asts: M. Gasol 5		Pts: Laprovittola 27; Rebs: Deck 8 Asts: Laprovittola 4

Saitama Super Arena, Saitama
Referees: Yohan Rosso (FRA), Maj Forsberg (DEN), Guilherme Locatelli (BRA)

1 August 2021
17:20
v

Boxscore

Spain	87–95	Slovenia
Scoring by quarter: 24–20, 20–21, 26–27, 17–27
Pts: Rubio 18; Rebs: Claver, M. Gasol 6 Asts: Rubio 9		Pts: Čančar 22; Rebs: Dončić, Tobey 14; Asts: Dončić 9

Saitama Super Arena, Saitama
Referees: Ademir Zurapović (BIH), Yohan Rosso (FRA), Matthew Kallio (CAN)

Quarterfinal

3 August 2021
13:40
v

Boxscore

Spain	81–95	United States
Scoring by quarter: 21–19, 22–24, 20–26, 18–26
Pts: Rubio 38; Rebs: W. Hernangómez 10; Asts: W. Hernangómez 3		Pts: Durant 29; Rebs: Booker 9 Asts: Booker, Holiday 5

Saitama Super Arena, Saitama
Referees: Guilherme Locatelli (BRA), Yohan Rosso (FRA), Michael Weiland (CAN)

=== Women's tournament ===
Spain women's basketball team qualified for the Olympics as one of three highest-ranked eligible squads from group B at the Belgrade meet of the 2020 FIBA Women's Olympic Qualifying Tournament.

Team roster

A 14-player roster was announced on 7 July 2021. The final squad was revealed on 11 July 2021.

Spain women's national basketball team – 2020 Summer Olympics roster
Players
Coaches

Pos.	No.	Name	Age – Date of birth	Height	Club	Ctr.
PG	5	Cristina Ouviña	30 – 18 September 1990	1.73 m (5 ft 8 in)	Valencia Basket	(Spain)
G	6	Silvia Domínguez	34 – 31 January 1987	1.65 m (5 ft 5 in)	Perfumerías Avenida	(Spain)
SF	7	Alba Torrens	31 – 30 August 1989	1.92 m (6 ft 4 in)	UMMC Ekaterinburg	(Russia)
PG	9	Laia Palau	41 – 10 September 1979	1.78 m (5 ft 10 in)	Uni Girona CB	(Spain)
SG	11	Leonor Rodríguez	29 – 21 October 1991	1.80 m (5 ft 11 in)	Perfumerías Avenida	(Spain)
PG	12	Maite Cazorla	24 – 18 June 1997	1.78 m (5 ft 10 in)	Perfumerías Avenida	(Spain)
PF	13	Tamara Abalde	32 – 6 February 1989	1.92 m (6 ft 4 in)	Porta XI Ensino	(Spain)
C	14	Raquel Carrera	19 – 31 October 2001	1.90 m (6 ft 3 in)	Valencia Basket	(Spain)
SF	18	Queralt Casas	28 – 18 November 1992	1.80 m (5 ft 11 in)	Valencia Basket	(Spain)
SF	22	María Conde	24 – 14 January 1997	1.86 m (6 ft 1 in)	USK Praha	(Czech Republic)
C	24	Laura Gil	29 – 24 April 1992	1.90 m (6 ft 3 in)	Valencia Basket	(Spain)
C	45	Astou Ndour	26 – 22 August 1994	1.98 m (6 ft 6 in)	Hatay BB	(Turkey)

Head coach

- (Spain) Lucas Mondelo

Assistant coach(es)

- (Spain) Roberto Hernández
- (Spain) Madelén Urieta

Legend

- Club – describes last
  club before the tournament
- Age – describes age
  on 26 July 2021

Group play

Pos	Team	Pld	W	L	PF	PA	PD	Pts	Qualification
1	Spain	3	3	0	234	205	+29	6	Quarterfinals
2	Serbia	3	2	1	207	214	−7	5	Quarterfinals
3	Canada	3	1	2	208	201	+7	4	
4	South Korea	3	0	3	183	212	−29	3	

Source: TOCOG and FIBA
Rules for classification: 1) classification points; 2) head-to-head results; 3) head-to-head game points difference; 4) head-to-head number of game points scored.

26 July 2021
10:00
v

Boxscore

South Korea	69–73	Spain
Scoring by quarter: 15–16, 20–17, 18–21, 16–19
Pts: Kang 26; Rebs: Park Ji-s. 10; Asts: Park H. 5		Pts: Ndour 28; Rebs: Gil 14; Asts: Ouviña 8

Saitama Super Arena, Saitama
Referees: Ferdinand Pascual (PHI), Andreia Silva (BRA), Kingsley Ojeaburu (NGR)

29 July 2021
17:20
v

Boxscore

Spain	85–70	Serbia
Scoring by quarter: 19–20, 22–24, 18–14, 26–12
Pts: Ndour 20; Rebs: Ndour 9 Asts: Ouviña 8		Pts: Brooks 16; Rebs: Anderson 8 Asts: three players 4

Saitama Super Arena, Saitama
Referees: Yohan Rosso (FRA), Maj Forsberg (DEN), Andreia Silva (BRA)

1 August 2021
10:00
v

Boxscore

Canada	66–76	Spain
Scoring by quarter: 13–23, 21–17, 13–20, 19–16
Pts: Nurse 14; Rebs: four players 6 Asts: Carleton 4		Pts: Ndour 20; Rebs: Ndour 11; Asts: Ouviña 7

Saitama Super Arena, Saitama
Referees: Yu Jung (TPE), Leandro Lezcano (ARG), Yevgeniy Mikheyev (KAZ)

Quarterfinal

4 August 2021
21:00
v

Boxscore

Spain	64–67	France
Scoring by quarter: 16–21, 14–15, 18–19, 16–12
Pts: Ndour 16; Rebs: Ndour 11; Asts: Gil 4		Pts: Johannès 18; Rebs: three players 5 Asts: Duchet 5

Saitama Super Arena, Saitama
Referees: Manuel Mazzoni (ITA), Andreia Silva (BRA), Scott Beker (AUS)

== Boxing ==
Spain entered four boxers into the Olympic tournament. Fourth-seeded Gabriel Escobar (men's flyweight), José Quiles (men's featherweight), Russian-born Gazimagomed Jalidov (men's light heavyweight), and Emmanuel Reyes (men's heavyweight) secured the spots on the Spanish squad in their respective weight divisions, either by winning the round of 16 match, advancing to the semifinal match, or scoring a box-off triumph, at the 2020 European Qualification Tournament in London and Paris.

Athlete	Event	Round of 32	Round of 16	Quarterfinals	Semifinals	Final	
Athlete	Event	Opposition Result	Opposition Result	Opposition Result	Opposition Result	Opposition Result	Rank
Gabriel Escobar	Men's flyweight	Quiroga (ARG); W 5–0	Asenov (BUL); W 4–1	Bibossinov (KAZ); L 2–3	Did not advance		
José Quiles	Men's featherweight	Walker (IRL); L 0–5	Did not advance				
Gazimagomed Jalidov	Men's light heavyweight	Bye	Aokuso (AUS); W 3–2	Khataev (ROC); L KO	Did not advance		
Enmanuel Reyes	Men's heavyweight	Bye	Levit (KAZ); W KO	La Cruz (CUB); L 1–4	Did not advance		

== Canoeing ==
=== Slalom ===
Spanish canoeists qualified boats in all four classes through the 2019 ICF Canoe Slalom World Championships in La Seu d'Urgell, Spain.

Athlete	Event	Preliminary						Semifinal		Final	
Athlete	Event	Run 1	Rank	Run 2	Rank	Best	Rank	Time	Rank	Time	Rank
Ander Elosegi	Men's C-1	103.78	8	101.51	4	101.51	7	103.15	3	106.59	8
David Llorente	Men's K-1	147.62	22	95.83	14	95.83	18	98.26	8	150.08	10
Núria Vilarrubla	Women's C-1	118.03	9	121.00	15	118.03	1	119.99	8	127.33	8
Maialen Chourraut	Women's K-1	108.25	6	105.13	5	105.13	5	107.92	7	106.63	2nd place, silver medalist(s)

=== Sprint ===
Spanish canoeists qualified four boats in the 2019 ICF Canoe Sprint World Championships in Szeged, Hungary, Meanwhile, three additional boats were awarded to the Spanish canoeists each in the men's C-2 1000 m, women's K-1 500 m, and women's C-1 200 m, respectively, with their top-two placements at the 2021 European Canoe Sprint Qualification Regatta. The team was announced on 15 May 2021, excepting the women's C-1 canoeist who would be decided later.

Men

Athlete	Event	Heats		Quarterfinals		Semifinals		Final	
Athlete	Event	Time	Rank	Time	Rank	Time	Rank	Time	Rank
Cayetano García	C-1 1000 m	4:34.418	4 q	4:31.929	5	Did not advance			
Pablo Martínez	C-1 1000 m	4:21.729	5 q	4:09.102	3	Did not advance			
Cayetano García; Pablo Martínez	C-2 1000 m	3:44.947	2 Q	Bye		3:28.594	4 FA	3:41.572	8
Carlos Arévalo	K-1 200 m	34.452	2 Q	Bye		35.207	3 FA	35.391	5
Saúl Craviotto	K-1 200 m	35.002	2 Q	Bye		35.934	4 FA	35.568	7
Francisco Cubelos; Íñigo Peña	K-2 1000 m	3:10.138	1 Q	Bye		3:19.133	4 FA	3:17.267	6
Carlos Arévalo; Saúl Craviotto; Rodrigo Germade; Marcus Walz	K-4 500 m	1:21.658	1 Q	—N/a		1:24.355	1 FA	1:22.445	2nd place, silver medalist(s)

Women

Athlete	Event	Heats		Quarterfinals		Semifinals		Final	
Athlete	Event	Time	Rank	Time	Rank	Time	Rank	Time	Rank
Antía Jácome	C-1 200 m	46.691	3 q	45.668	1 Q	47.414	4 FA	47.226	5
Teresa Portela	K-1 200 m	40.812	1 Q	Bye		38.858	4 FA	38.883	2nd place, silver medalist(s)
Isabel Contreras	K-1 500 m	1:49.256	4 q	1:51.235	1 Q	1:54.535	6 FC	1:55.728	19

Qualification Legend: Q = Qualify to semifinals; q = Qualify to quarterfinals; FA = Qualify to final (medal); FB = Qualify to final B (non-medal); FC = Qualify to final C (non-medal)

== Cycling ==
=== Road ===
Spain entered a squad of seven riders (five men and two women) to compete in their respective Olympic road races, by virtue of their top 6 national finish (for men) and top 22 (for women) in the UCI World Ranking.

Men

Athlete	Event	Time	Rank
Omar Fraile	Road race	Did not finish	
Jesús Herrada	Road race	6:16:53	62
Gorka Izagirre	Road race	6:11:46	23
Ion Izagirre	Road race	6:21:46	79
Ion Izagirre	Time trial	Did not finish	
Alejandro Valverde	Road race	6:15:38	42

Women

Athlete	Event	Time	Rank
Mavi García	Road race	3:54:31	12
Mavi García	Time trial	34:39.96	23
Ane Santesteban	Road race	3:56:04	28

=== Track ===
Following the completion of the 2020 UCI Track Cycling World Championships, Spanish riders accumulated spots for both men's madison and omnium, based on the country's results in the final UCI Olympic rankings.

Omnium

Athlete	Event	Scratch race		Tempo race		Elimination race		Points race		Total points	Rank
Athlete	Event	Rank	Points	Rank	Points	Rank	Points	Rank	Points	Total points	Rank
Albert Torres	Men's omnium	15	12	10	22	7	28	11	22	84	10

Madison

Athlete	Event	Points	Laps	Rank
Sebastián Mora; Albert Torres	Men's madison	14	0	6

=== Mountain biking ===
Spanish mountain bikers qualified for three quota places (two men's and one women's) into the Olympic cross-country race, as a result of the nation's sixth-place finish for men and twentieth for women, respectively, in the UCI Olympic Ranking List of 16 May 2021.

Athlete	Event	Time	Rank
Jofre Cullell	Men's cross-country	1:28:16	15
David Valero	Men's cross-country	1:25:48	3rd place, bronze medalist(s)
Rocío del Alba García	Women's cross-country	1:26:32	26

== Diving ==
Spain sent two divers into the Olympic competition by finishing among the top 18 in the men's springboard at the 2021 FINA World Cup in Tokyo, Japan.

Athlete	Event	Preliminary		Semifinal		Final	
Athlete	Event	Points	Rank	Points	Rank	Points	Rank
Alberto Arévalo	Men's 3 m springboard	322.85	26	Did not advance			
Nicolás García Boissier	Men's 3 m springboard	382.6	19	Did not advance			

== Equestrian ==
Spanish equestrians qualified a full squad in the team dressage competition by virtue of a top-six finish at the 2018 FEI World Equestrian Games in Tryon, North Carolina, United States. MeanwhIle, two riders were added to the Spanish roster based on the following results in the individual FEI Olympic rankings: a top two finish outside the group selection for Group B (South Western Europe) in eventing and a highest overall placement outside the group and continental selection in jumping.

=== Dressage ===
Athlete	Horse	Event	Grand Prix		Grand Prix Special		Grand Prix Freestyle		Overall	
Athlete	Horse	Event	Score	Rank	Score	Rank	Technical	Artistic	Score	Rank
Beatriz Ferrer-Salat	Elegance	Individual	72.096	18 q	—N/a		72.607	82.457	77.532	17
José Antonio García Mena	Sorento / Divina Royal^{TF}	Individual	69.146	32	—N/a		Did not advance			
Severo Jurado	Fendi T	Individual	68.370	38	—N/a		Did not advance			
Beatriz Ferrer-Salat; José Antonio García Mena; Severo Jurado	See above	Team	6749.5	8 Q	7198.5	7	—N/a		7198.5	7

Qualification Legend: Q = Qualified for the final; q = Qualified for the final as a lucky loser
TF = Substituted for the team final

=== Eventing ===
Athlete	Horse	Event	Dressage		Cross-country			Jumping						Total	
Athlete	Horse	Event	Dressage		Cross-country			Qualifier			Final			Total	
Athlete	Horse	Event	Penalties	Rank	Penalties	Total	Rank	Penalties	Total	Rank	Penalties	Total	Rank	Penalties	Rank
Francisco Gaviño	Source de la Faye	Individual	47.70	62	75.60	123.30	51	12.00	135.30	44	Did not advance			135.30	44

=== Jumping ===
Athlete	Horse	Event	Qualification		Final		
Athlete	Horse	Event	Penalties	Rank	Penalties	Time	Rank
Eduardo Álvarez Aznar	Legend	Individual	4	=31	Did not advance		

== Fencing ==
Spain entered one fencer into the Olympic competition, marking the country's return to the sport for the first time since 2008. Carlos Llavador claimed a spot in the men's foil as one of the two highest-ranked fencers vying for qualification from Europe in the FIE Adjusted Official Rankings.

Athlete	Event	Round of 64	Round of 32	Round of 16	Quarterfinal	Semifinal	Final / BM	
Athlete	Event	Opposition Score	Opposition Score	Opposition Score	Opposition Score	Opposition Score	Opposition Score	Rank
Carlos Llavador	Men's foil	Bye	Choupenitch (CZE); L 11–15	Did not advance				

== Field hockey ==
Summary

Key:

- FT – After full time.
- P – Match decided by penalty-shootout.

Team	Event	Group stage						Quarterfinal	Semifinal	Final / BM	
Team	Event	Opposition Score	Opposition Score	Opposition Score	Opposition Score	Opposition Score	Rank	Opposition Score	Opposition Score	Opposition Score	Rank
Spain men's	Men's tournament	Argentina; D 1–1	New Zealand; L 3–4	India; L 0–3	Japan; W 4–1	Australia; D 1–1	4 Q	Belgium; L 1–3	Did not advance		
Spain women's	Women's tournament	Australia; L 1–3	Argentina; L 0–3	New Zealand; W 2–1	China; W 2–0	Japan; W 2–1	2 Q	Great Britain; L 2–2 (0–2)	Did not advance		

=== Men's tournament ===
Spain men's field hockey team qualified for the Olympics by securing one of the seven tickets available and defeating France in a playoff at the Valencia leg of the 2019 FIH Olympic Qualifiers.

Team roster

The squad was announced on 5 July 2021. On 9 July, Joan Tarrés withdrew injured and was replaced by Llorenç Piera.

Head coach: (France) Fred Soyez

No.	Pos.	Player	Date of birth (age)	Caps	Goals	Club
1	GK	Quico Cortés	29 March 1983 (aged 38)	310	0	(Spain) Club Egara
2	DF	Alejandro Alonso	14 February 1999 (aged 22)	9	0	(Spain) Tenis
3	DF	Josep Romeu	22 May 1990 (aged 31)	142	24	(Spain) Club Egara
4	DF	Ricardo Sánchez	4 December 1992 (aged 28)	91	9	(Spain) Club de Campo
6	MF	Marc Salles	6 May 1987 (aged 34)	250	9	(Spain) Atlètic Terrassa
7	DF	Miquel Delas (Captain)	13 April 1984 (aged 37)	264	10	(Spain) Barcelona
8	MF	Quique González	29 April 1996 (aged 25)	119	17	(Spain) Club de Campo
9	MF	Álvaro Iglesias	1 March 1993 (aged 28)	147	34	(Spain) Club de Campo
10	FW	David Alegre	6 September 1984 (aged 36)	281	32	(Spain) Real Club de Polo
11	MF	Roc Oliva	18 July 1989 (aged 32)	175	18	(Spain) Real Club de Polo
12	DF	Marc Recasens	13 September 1999 (aged 21)	19	0	(Spain) Club Egara
13	DF	Llorenç Piera	4 November 1996 (aged 24)	41	0	(Spain) Real Club de Polo
17	FW	Xavi Lleonart	22 June 1990 (aged 31)	208	41	(Spain) Real Club de Polo
19	FW	José Basterra	3 January 1997 (aged 24)	8	2	(Spain) Club de Campo
21	MF	Viçens Ruiz	30 October 1991 (aged 29)	169	12	(Spain) Real Club de Polo
22	FW	Albert Béltran	23 October 1993 (aged 27)	88	27	(Spain) Atlètic Terrassa
25	FW	Pau Quemada	4 September 1983 (aged 37)	283	119	(Spain) Club Egara
27	MF	Marc Boltó	21 November 1995 (aged 25)	80	8	(Spain) Atlètic Terrassa

Group play

Pos	Team	Pld	W	D	L	GF	GA	GD	Pts	Qualification
1	Australia	5	4	1	0	22	9	+13	13	Quarter-finals
2	India	5	4	0	1	15	13	+2	12	Quarter-finals
3	Argentina	5	2	1	2	10	11	−1	7	Quarter-finals
4	Spain	5	1	2	2	9	10	−1	5	Quarter-finals
5	New Zealand	5	1	1	3	11	16	−5	4	
6	Japan (H)	5	0	1	4	10	18	−8	1	

Source: Tokyo 2020 and FIH
Rules for classification: 1) points; 2) matches won; 3) goal difference; 4) goals for; 5) head-to-head result; 6) field goals scored.
(H) Hosts

24 July 2021
12:15
v

Argentina	1–1	Spain
Mazzilli 23'	Report	Quemada 52'

South Pitch
Umpires:
Simon Taylor (NZL)
David Tomlinson (NZL)

25 July 2021
20:45
v

Spain	3–4	New Zealand
González 26'; Quemada 31'; Boltó 39'	Report	Jenness 14'; Tarrant 27'; Russell 48'; Smith 57'

North Pitch
Umpires:
Lim Hong Zhen (SGP)
Adam Kearns (AUS)

27 July 2021
10:00
v

India	3–0	Spain
Simranjeet 14'; Rupinder 15', 51'	Report

South Pitch
Umpires:
Jakub Mejzlík (CZE)
Peter Wright (RSA)

28 July 2021
20:45
v

Japan	1–4	Spain
Zendana 2'	Report	Lleonart 3', 55'; Quemada 23'; Alegre 28'

North Pitch
Umpires:
Lim Hong Zhen (SGP)
Martin Madden (GBR)

30 July 2021
10:00
v

Australia	1–1	Spain
Wickham 18'	Report	Quemada 60'

South Pitch
Umpires:
Javed Shaikh (IND)
Jakub Mejzlík (CZE)

Quarterfinal

1 August 2021
18:30
v

Belgium	3–1	Spain
Hendrickx 38', 57'; Boon 41'	Report	Alegre 26'

Umpires:
Adam Kearns (AUS)
Lim Hong Zhen (SGP)

=== Women's tournament ===
Spain women's field hockey team qualified for the Olympics by securing one of the seven tickets available and defeating South Korea in a playoff at the Valencia leg of the 2019 FIH Olympic Qualifiers.

Team roster

The squad was announced on 5 July 2021.

Head coach: (United Kingdom) Adrian Lock

No.	Pos.	Player	Date of birth (age)	Caps	Goals	Club
1	GK	María Ruiz	18 March 1990 (aged 31)	157	{{{goals}}}	(Spain) Club de Campo
2	MF	Laura Barrios	4 September 2000 (aged 20)	0	{{{goals}}}	(Spain) Club de Campo
4	MF	Clara Ycart	10 January 1999 (aged 22)	54	{{{goals}}}	(Spain) CD Terrassa
7	FW	Carlota Petchame	25 June 1990 (aged 31)	200	{{{goals}}}	(Spain) Junior
9	DF	María López García	16 February 1990 (aged 31)	193	{{{goals}}}	(Spain) Club de Campo
10	FW	Berta Bonastre	3 June 1992 (aged 29)	193	{{{goals}}}	(Spain) Club Egara
12	FW	Carmen Cano	31 December 1992 (aged 28)		{{{goals}}}	
13	FW	Belén Iglesias	6 July 1996 (aged 25)	53	{{{goals}}}	(Germany) Großflottbek
16	DF	Candela Mejías	27 January 1997 (aged 24)	22	{{{goals}}}	(Spain) Club de Campo
17	DF	Lola Riera	25 June 1991 (aged 30)	184	{{{goals}}}	(Spain) Complutense
18	MF	Júlia Pons	27 July 1994 (aged 26)	169	{{{goals}}}	(Spain) CD Terrassa
19	FW	Begoña García Grau	19 July 1995 (aged 26)	135	{{{goals}}}	(Spain) Club de Campo
20	DF	Xantal Giné	23 September 1992 (aged 28)		{{{goals}}}	
21	MF	Beatriz Pérez	4 May 1991 (aged 30)	206	{{{goals}}}	(Spain) Club de Campo
23	MF	Georgina Oliva (Captain)	18 July 1990 (aged 31)	235	{{{goals}}}	(Spain) Junior
24	MF	Alejandra Torres-Quevedo	30 September 1999 (aged 21)	43	{{{goals}}}	(Spain) Club de Campo
25	FW	Alicia Magaz	24 May 1994 (aged 27)	105	{{{goals}}}	(Spain) Club de Campo
29	MF	Lucía Jiménez	8 January 1997 (aged 24)	125	{{{goals}}}	(Spain) Complutense

Group play

Pos	Team	Pld	W	D	L	GF	GA	GD	Pts	Qualification
1	Australia	5	5	0	0	13	1	+12	15	Quarterfinals
2	Spain	5	3	0	2	9	8	+1	9	Quarterfinals
3	Argentina	5	3	0	2	8	8	0	9	Quarterfinals
4	New Zealand	5	2	0	3	8	7	+1	6	Quarterfinals
5	China	5	2	0	3	9	16	−7	6	
6	Japan (H)	5	0	0	5	6	13	−7	0	

Source: Tokyo 2020 and FIH
Rules for classification: 1) points; 2) matches won; 3) goal difference; 4) goals for; 5) head-to-head result; 6) field goals scored.
(H) Hosts

25 July 2021
10:00
v

Australia	3–1	Spain
Malone 31'; Chalker 32'; Stewart 37'	Report	Pérez 33'

South Pitch
Umpires:
Michelle Joubert (RSA)
Annelize Rostron (RSA)

26 July 2021
19:00
v

Argentina	3–0	Spain
Raposo 47'; Albertario 57'; Barrionuevo 59'	Report

South Pitch
Umpires:
Ayanna McClean (TTO)
Aleisha Neumann (AUS)

28 July 2021
11:45
v

New Zealand	1–2	Spain
Smith 35'	Report	Iglesias 8'; Riera 22'

North Pitch
Umpires:
Carolina de la Fuente (ARG)
Michelle Meister (GER)

29 July 2021
18:30
v

Spain	2–0	China
Pérez 4'; Bonastre 19'	Report

North Pitch
Umpires:
Michelle Meister (GER)
Irene Presenqui (ARG)

31 July 2021
10:00
v

Japan	1–4	Spain
Mori 6'	Report	Barrios 25'; García Grau 38'; Mejías 55'; Bonastre 57'

South Pitch
Umpires:
Sarah Wilson (GBR)
Maggie Giddens (USA)

Quarterfinal

2 August 2021
21:00
v

Spain	2–2	Great Britain
Iglesias 20'; Bonastre 51'	Report	Martin 17'; Balsdon 37'
Penalties
Ycart (penalty shoot-out missed); García Grau (penalty shoot-out missed); Oliva (penalty shoot-out missed); Pérez (penalty shoot-out missed)	0–2	(penalty shoot-out missed) Toman; (penalty shoot-out scored) Martin; (penalty shoot-out scored) Jones

Umpires:
Aleisha Neumann (AUS)
Annelize Rostron (RSA)

== Football ==
Summary

Key:

- A.E.T – After extra time.
- P – Match decided by penalty shoot-out.

Team	Event	Group stage				Quarterfinal	Semifinal	Final / BM	
Team	Event	Opposition Score	Opposition Score	Opposition Score	Rank	Opposition Score	Opposition Score	Opposition Score	Rank
Spain men's	Men's tournament	Egypt; D 0–0	Australia; W 1–0	Argentina; D 1–1	1	Ivory Coast; W 5–2	Japan; W 1–0	Brazil; L 1–2	2nd place, silver medalist(s)

=== Men's tournament ===
Spain men's football team qualified for the Games by reaching the semifinal stage and securing an outright berth at the 2019 UEFA European Under-21 Championship in Italy, signifying the country's return to the Olympic football scene for the first time since London 2012.

Team roster

Spain's 60-man preliminary squad was announced on 5 June 2021. The 22-man squad was announced on 29 June 2021, with Iván Villar replacing the injured Álex Domínguez.

Head coach: Luis de la Fuente

No.	Pos.	Player	Date of birth (age)	Caps	Goals	Club
1	GK	Unai Simón	11 June 1997 (aged 24)	1	0	(Royal Spanish Football Federation) Athletic Bilbao
2	DF	Óscar Mingueza	13 May 1999 (aged 22)	1	0	(Royal Spanish Football Federation) Barcelona
3	DF	Marc Cucurella	22 July 1998 (aged 23)	1	0	(Royal Spanish Football Federation) Getafe
4	DF	Pau Torres	16 January 1997 (aged 24)	1	0	(Royal Spanish Football Federation) Villarreal
5	DF	Jesús Vallejo (captain)	5 January 1997 (aged 24)	0	0	(Royal Spanish Football Federation) Granada
6	MF	Martín Zubimendi	2 February 1999 (aged 22)	1	0	(Royal Spanish Football Federation) Real Sociedad
7	FW	Marco Asensio*	21 January 1996 (aged 25)	1	0	(Royal Spanish Football Federation) Real Madrid
8	MF	Mikel Merino*	22 June 1996 (aged 25)	1	0	(Royal Spanish Football Federation) Real Sociedad
9	FW	Rafa Mir	18 June 1997 (aged 24)	1	0	(Royal Spanish Football Federation) Huesca
10	MF	Dani Ceballos*	7 August 1996 (aged 24)	1	0	(The Football Association) Arsenal
11	FW	Mikel Oyarzabal	21 April 1997 (aged 24)	1	0	(Royal Spanish Football Federation) Real Sociedad
12	DF	Eric García	9 January 2001 (aged 20)	1	0	(The Football Association) Manchester City
13	GK	Álvaro Fernández	13 April 1998 (aged 23)	1	0	(Royal Spanish Football Federation) Huesca
14	MF	Carlos Soler	2 January 1997 (aged 24)	1	1	(Royal Spanish Football Federation) Valencia
15	MF	Jon Moncayola	13 May 1998 (aged 23)	1	0	(Royal Spanish Football Federation) Osasuna
16	MF	Pedri	25 November 2002 (aged 18)	1	0	(Royal Spanish Football Federation) Barcelona
17	FW	Javi Puado	25 May 1998 (aged 23)	1	0	(Royal Spanish Football Federation) Espanyol
18	DF	Óscar Gil	26 April 1998 (aged 23)	1	0	(Royal Spanish Football Federation) Espanyol
19	MF	Dani Olmo	7 May 1998 (aged 23)	1	0	(German Football Association) RB Leipzig
20	DF	Juan Miranda	19 January 2000 (aged 21)	1	0	(Royal Spanish Football Federation) Betis
21	FW	Bryan Gil	11 February 2001 (aged 20)	1	0	(Royal Spanish Football Federation) Eibar
22	GK	Iván Villar	9 July 1997 (aged 24)	0	0	(Royal Spanish Football Federation) Celta Vigo

* Overage player.

Group play

Pos	Team	Pld	W	D	L	GF	GA	GD	Pts	Qualification
1	Spain	3	1	2	0	2	1	+1	5	Advance to knockout stage
2	Egypt	3	1	1	1	2	1	+1	4	Advance to knockout stage
3	Argentina	3	1	1	1	2	3	−1	4	
4	Australia	3	1	0	2	2	3	−1	3	

Source: TOCOG and FIFA
Rules for classification: Group stage tiebreakers
22 July 2021
16:30

Egypt	0–0	Spain
	Report (TOCOG); Report (FIFA)

Sapporo Dome, Sapporo
Referee: Adham Makhadmeh (Jordan)

25 July 2021
19:30

Australia	0–1	Spain
	Report (TOCOG); Report (FIFA)	Oyarzabal 81'

Sapporo Dome, Sapporo
Referee: Bamlak Tessema Weyesa (Ethiopia)

28 July 2021
20:00

Spain	1–1	Argentina
Merino 66'	Report (TOCOG); Report (FIFA)	Belmonte 87'

Saitama Stadium 2002, Saitama
Referee: Ismail Elfath (United States)

Quarterfinal

31 July 2021
17:00

Spain	5–2 (a.e.t.)	Ivory Coast
Olmo 30'; Mir 90+3', 117', 120+1'; Oyarzabal 98' (pen.)	Report (TOCOG); Report (FIFA)	Bailly 10'; Gradel 90+1'

Miyagi Stadium, Rifu
Attendance: 5,526
Referee: Jesús Valenzuela (Venezuela)

Semifinal

3 August 2021
20:00

Japan	0–1 (a.e.t.)	Spain
	Report (TOCOG); Report (FIFA)	Asensio 115'

Saitama Stadium 2002, Saitama
Referee: Kevin Ortega (Peru)

Gold medal match

7 August 2021
20:30

Brazil	2–1 (a.e.t.)	Spain
Cunha 45+2'; Malcom 108'	Report (TOCOG); Report (FIFA)	Oyarzabal 61'

International Stadium Yokohama, Yokohama
Attendance: 0 (Note: Played behind closed doors due to the COVID-19 pandemic in Japan)
Referee: Chris Beath (Australia)

== Golf ==
Spain entered four golfers (two per gender) into the Olympic tournament. Jon Rahm (world no. 1), Adri Arnaus (world no. 147), Carlota Ciganda (world no. 32), and Azahara Muñoz (world no. 84) qualified directly among the top 60 eligible players for their respective events based on the IGF World Rankings. Sergio García (world no. 48) and Rafa Cabrera-Bello (world no. 140) qualified but opted not to play. Later, Jon Rahm tested positive for COVID-19 and was replaced by Jorge Campillo

Athlete	Event	Round 1	Round 2	Round 3	Round 4	Total		
Athlete	Event	Score	Score	Score	Score	Score	Par	Rank
Adri Arnaus	Men's	68	69	74	67	278	−6	=38
Jorge Campillo	Men's	70	75	69	75	289	+5	59
Carlota Ciganda	Women's	68	73	70	69	280	−4	=29
Azahara Muñoz	Women's	69	76	73	72	290	+6	=50

== Gymnastics ==
=== Artistic ===
Spain fielded two full teams of four gymnasts each into the Olympic competition for the first time since Athens 2004. Both men's and women's squads secured each one of the remaining nine places in the team all-around at the 2019 World Championships in Stuttgart, Germany.

Men
Team

Athlete	Event	Qualification								Final							
Athlete	Event	Apparatus						Total	Rank	Apparatus						Total	Rank
Athlete	Event	F	PH	R	V	PB	HB	Total	Rank	F	PH	R	V	PB	HB	Total	Rank
Néstor Abad	Team	13.666	11.466	11.966	13.000	14.800	13.133	78.031	53	Did not advance							
Thierno Diallo	Team	12.233	12.900	13.000	12.833	14.000	11.100	76.066	56	Did not advance							
Nicolau Mir	Team	13.533	12.600	12.400	13.866	14.033	13.233	79.665	48	Did not advance							
Joel Plata	Team	13.500	13.433	13.300	13.966	14.633	12.466	81.298	37	Did not advance							
Total	Team	40.699	38.933	38.700	40.832	43.466	38.832	241.462	12	Did not advance							

Individual

Athlete	Event	Qualification								Final							
Athlete	Event	Apparatus						Total	Rank	Apparatus						Total	Rank
Athlete	Event	F	PH	R	V	PB	HB	Total	Rank	F	PH	R	V	PB	HB	Total	Rank
Rayderley Zapata	Floor	15.041	—N/a					15.041	4 Q	14.933	—N/a					14.933	2nd place, silver medalist(s)

Women
Team

Athlete	Event	Qualification						Final					
Athlete	Event	Apparatus				Total	Rank	Apparatus				Total	Rank
Athlete	Event	V	UB	BB	F	Total	Rank	V	UB	BB	F	Total	Rank
Laura Bechdejú	Team	13.533	12.700	12.666	12.300	51.199	53	Did not advance					
Marina González	Team	13.233	11.033	12.366	12.866	49.498	63	Did not advance					
Alba Petisco	Team	13.466	12.866	11.700	12.566	50.598	57	Did not advance					
Roxana Popa	Team	14.300	14.400	12.866	12.533	54.099	21 Q	Did not advance					
Total	Team	41.299	39.966	37.898	37.965	157.128	12	Did not advance					

Individual

Athlete	Event	Qualification						Final					
Athlete	Event	Apparatus				Total	Rank	Apparatus				Total	Rank
Athlete	Event	V	UB	BB	F	Total	Rank	V	UB	BB	F	Total	Rank
Roxana Popa	All-around	See team results						14.600	12.100	11.700	13.133	51.133	22

== Handball ==
Summary

Key:

- ET – After extra time.
- P – Match decided by penalty-shootout.

Team	Event	Group stage						Quarterfinal	Semifinal	Final / BM	
Team	Event	Opposition Score	Opposition Score	Opposition Score	Opposition Score	Opposition Score	Rank	Opposition Score	Opposition Score	Opposition Score	Rank
Spain men's	Men's tournament	Germany; W 28–27	Norway; W 28–27	Brazil; W 32–25	France; L 31–36	Argentina; W 36–27	2 Q	Sweden; W 34–33	Denmark; L 23–27	Egypt; W 33–31	3rd place, bronze medalist(s)
Spain women's	Women's tournament	Sweden; L 24–31	France; W 28–25	Brazil; W 27–23	Hungary; L 25–29	ROC; L 31–34	5	Did not advance			

=== Men's tournament ===
Spain men's handball team qualified for the Olympics by winning the gold medal and securing an outright berth at the final match of the 2020 European Men's Handball Championship in Stockholm, Sweden.

Team roster

The squad was announced on 14 July 2021. On 29 July, Viran Morros was replaced by Miguel Sánchez-Migallón.

Head coach: Jordi Ribera

No.	Pos.	Name	Date of birth (age)	Height	App.	Goals	Club
1	GK	Gonzalo Pérez de Vargas	10 January 1991 (aged 30)	1.89 m	113	10	(Spain) Barça
3	RB	Eduardo Gurbindo	8 November 1987 (aged 33)	1.95 m	121	167	(North Macedonia) RK Vardar
5	RB	Jorge Maqueda	6 February 1988 (aged 33)	1.97 m	139	353	(Hungary) Telekom Veszprém
6	LW	Ángel Fernández	16 September 1988 (aged 32)	1.93 m	60	180	(Spain) Barça
9	CB	Raúl Entrerríos	12 February 1981 (aged 40)	1.88 m	269	618	Not attached
10	RB	Alex Dujshebaev	17 December 1992 (aged 28)	1.88 m	99	264	(Poland) Łomża Vive Kielce
11	CB	Daniel Sarmiento	25 August 1983 (aged 37)	1.88 m	120	244	(France) Saint-Raphaël
12	GK	Rodrigo Corrales	24 January 1991 (aged 30)	2.00 m	72	3	(Hungary) Telekom Veszprém
13	P	Julen Aguinagalde	8 December 1982 (aged 38)	1.96 m	197	470	(Spain) CD Bidasoa
14	RW	Ferran Solé	25 August 1992 (aged 28)	1.93 m	50	213	(France) Paris Saint-Germain
17	P	Adrià Figueras	8 December 1988 (aged 32)	1.93 m	78	186	(France) C' Chartres MHB
24	LB	Viran Morros	15 December 1983 (aged 37)	1.99 m	228	166	(Germany) Füchse Berlin
26	LB	Antonio García Robledo	6 March 1984 (aged 37)	1.93 m	78	145	(Spain) BM Granollers
28	RW	Aleix Gómez	7 May 1997 (aged 24)	1.84 m	35	118	(Spain) Barça
30	P	Gedeón Guardiola	1 October 1984 (aged 36)	1.98 m	147	177	(Germany) TBV Lemgo
51	LW	Miguel Sánchez-Migallón	8 February 1995 (aged 26)	2.02 m	4	4	(Spain) CB Ciudad de Logroño

Group play

Pos	Team	Pld	W	D	L	GF	GA	GD	Pts	Qualification
1	France	5	4	0	1	162	148	+14	8 (Note: France 36–31 Spain)	Quarter-finals
2	Spain	5	4	0	1	155	142	+13	8	Quarter-finals
3	Germany	5	3	0	2	146	131	+15	6 (Note: Germany 28–23 Norway)	Quarter-finals
4	Norway	5	3	0	2	136	132	+4	6	Quarter-finals
5	Brazil	5	1	0	4	128	145	−17	2	
6	Argentina	5	0	0	5	125	154	−29	0	

Source: Tokyo 2020 and IHF
Rules for classification: 1) Points; 2) Head-to-head points; 3) Head-to-head goal difference; 4) Head-to-head goals scored; 5) Goal difference; 6) Goals scored; 7) Draw.
Notes:

24 July 2021; 16:15	Germany	27–28	Spain	Yoyogi National Gymnasium, Tokyo; Referees: Kurtagic, Wetterwik (SWE)
24 July 2021; 16:15	Weinhold 5	(13–12)	Figueras, Gómez 5	Yoyogi National Gymnasium, Tokyo; Referees: Kurtagic, Wetterwik (SWE)
24 July 2021; 16:15	2× (yellow card) 5× (suspension)	Report	2× (yellow card) 2× (suspension)	Yoyogi National Gymnasium, Tokyo; Referees: Kurtagic, Wetterwik (SWE)

26 July 2021; 16:15	Spain	28–27	Norway	Yoyogi National Gymnasium, Tokyo; Referees: Nikolov, Nachevski (MKD)
26 July 2021; 16:15	Figueras 10	(13–14)	Jøndal 9	Yoyogi National Gymnasium, Tokyo; Referees: Nikolov, Nachevski (MKD)
26 July 2021; 16:15	1× (yellow card) 5× (suspension)	Report	2× (yellow card) 2× (suspension)	Yoyogi National Gymnasium, Tokyo; Referees: Nikolov, Nachevski (MKD)

28 July 2021; 19:30	Brazil	25–32	Spain	Yoyogi National Gymnasium, Tokyo; Referees: Hansen, Madsen (DEN)
28 July 2021; 19:30	Silva 6	(16–18)	Solé 5	Yoyogi National Gymnasium, Tokyo; Referees: Hansen, Madsen (DEN)
28 July 2021; 19:30	4× (suspension)	Report	1× (yellow card) 1× (suspension)	Yoyogi National Gymnasium, Tokyo; Referees: Hansen, Madsen (DEN)

30 July 2021; 14:15	France	36–31	Spain	Yoyogi National Gymnasium, Tokyo; Referees: Horáček, Novotný (CZE)
30 July 2021; 14:15	Remili 9	(18–12)	Dujshebaev, Gómez 5	Yoyogi National Gymnasium, Tokyo; Referees: Horáček, Novotný (CZE)
30 July 2021; 14:15	2× (yellow card) 3× (suspension)	Report	1× (yellow card) 2× (suspension)	Yoyogi National Gymnasium, Tokyo; Referees: Horáček, Novotný (CZE)

1 August 2021; 14:15	Spain	36–27	Argentina	Yoyogi National Gymnasium, Tokyo; Referees: Kurtagic, Wetterwik (SWE)
1 August 2021; 14:15	Gómez 6	(17–12)	Pizarro 5	Yoyogi National Gymnasium, Tokyo; Referees: Kurtagic, Wetterwik (SWE)
1 August 2021; 14:15	3× (suspension)	Report	3× (suspension)	Yoyogi National Gymnasium, Tokyo; Referees: Kurtagic, Wetterwik (SWE)

Quarterfinal

3 August 2021; 13:15	Sweden	33–34	Spain	Yoyogi National Gymnasium, Tokyo; Referees: Schulze, Tönnies (GER)
3 August 2021; 13:15	Wanne 10	(20–18)	Gómez 8	Yoyogi National Gymnasium, Tokyo; Referees: Schulze, Tönnies (GER)
3 August 2021; 13:15	1× (yellow card) 4× (suspension)	Report	2× (yellow card) 3× (suspension)	Yoyogi National Gymnasium, Tokyo; Referees: Schulze, Tönnies (GER)

Semifinal

5 August 2021; 21:00	Spain	23–27	Denmark	Yoyogi National Gymnasium, Tokyo; Referees: Brunner, Salah (SUI)
5 August 2021; 21:00	Dujshebaev, Figueras 5	(10–14)	M. Hansen 12	Yoyogi National Gymnasium, Tokyo; Referees: Brunner, Salah (SUI)
5 August 2021; 21:00	1× (yellow card) 4× (suspension)	Report	2× (suspension)	Yoyogi National Gymnasium, Tokyo; Referees: Brunner, Salah (SUI)

Bronze medal game

7 August 2021; 17:00	Egypt	31–33	Spain	Yoyogi National Gymnasium, Tokyo; Referees: Schulze, Tönnies (GER)
7 August 2021; 17:00	El-Ahmar, Shebib 7	(16–19)	Gómez 8	Yoyogi National Gymnasium, Tokyo; Referees: Schulze, Tönnies (GER)
7 August 2021; 17:00	2× (suspension)	Report	2× (yellow card) 4× (suspension) 1× (red card)	Yoyogi National Gymnasium, Tokyo; Referees: Schulze, Tönnies (GER)

=== Women's tournament ===
Spain women's handball team qualified for the Olympics by securing a top-two finish at the Llíria leg of the 2020 IHF Olympic Qualification Tournament.

Team roster

- Women's team event – 1 team of 15 players

Group play

Pos	Team	Pld	W	D	L	GF	GA	GD	Pts	Qualification
1	Sweden	5	3	1	1	152	133	+19	7 (Note: Sweden 36–24 ROC)	Quarter-finals
2	ROC	5	3	1	1	148	149	−1	7	Quarter-finals
3	France	5	2	1	2	139	135	+4	5	Quarter-finals
4	Hungary	5	2	0	3	142	149	−7	4 (Note: Hungary 29–25 Spain)	Quarter-finals
5	Spain	5	2	0	3	135	142	−7	4	
6	Brazil	5	1	1	3	133	141	−8	3	

Source: Tokyo 2020 and IHF
Rules for classification: 1) Points; 2) Head-to-head points; 3) Head-to-head goal difference; 4) Head-to-head goals scored; 5) Goal difference; 6) Goals scored; 7) Draw.
Notes:

25 July 2021; 19:30	Spain	24–31	Sweden	Yoyogi National Gymnasium, Tokyo; Referees: Koo, Lee (KOR)
25 July 2021; 19:30	Pena 7	(9–13)	Hansson 6	Yoyogi National Gymnasium, Tokyo; Referees: Koo, Lee (KOR)
25 July 2021; 19:30	1× (yellow card) 3× (suspension)	Report	2× (suspension)	Yoyogi National Gymnasium, Tokyo; Referees: Koo, Lee (KOR)

27 July 2021; 21:30	France	25–28	Spain	Yoyogi National Gymnasium, Tokyo; Referees: Brunner, Salah (SUI)
27 July 2021; 21:30	Coatanea, Pineau 5	(12–12)	Martín 6	Yoyogi National Gymnasium, Tokyo; Referees: Brunner, Salah (SUI)
27 July 2021; 21:30	2× (yellow card) 3× (suspension)	Report	2× (yellow card) 5× (suspension)	Yoyogi National Gymnasium, Tokyo; Referees: Brunner, Salah (SUI)

29 July 2021; 11:00	Spain	27–23	Brazil	Yoyogi National Gymnasium, Tokyo; Referees: Hansen, Madsen (DEN)
29 July 2021; 11:00	Pena 7	(13–13)	De Paula 8	Yoyogi National Gymnasium, Tokyo; Referees: Hansen, Madsen (DEN)
29 July 2021; 11:00	1× (yellow card) 1× (suspension)	Report	1× (yellow card) 3× (suspension)	Yoyogi National Gymnasium, Tokyo; Referees: Hansen, Madsen (DEN)

31 July 2021; 19:30	Hungary	29–25	Spain	Yoyogi National Gymnasium, Tokyo; Referees: Fonseca, Santos (POR)
31 July 2021; 19:30	Klujber, Vámos 6	(14–11)	Gutiérrez Bermejo, Martín 5	Yoyogi National Gymnasium, Tokyo; Referees: Fonseca, Santos (POR)
31 July 2021; 19:30	1× (yellow card) 5× (suspension)	Report	2× (suspension)	Yoyogi National Gymnasium, Tokyo; Referees: Fonseca, Santos (POR)

2 August 2021; 14:15	Spain	31–34	ROC	Yoyogi National Gymnasium, Tokyo; Referees: Hansen, Madsen (DEN)
2 August 2021; 14:15	López 7	(17–18)	Vyakhireva 7	Yoyogi National Gymnasium, Tokyo; Referees: Hansen, Madsen (DEN)
2 August 2021; 14:15	1× (yellow card) 1× (suspension)	Report	2× (suspension)	Yoyogi National Gymnasium, Tokyo; Referees: Hansen, Madsen (DEN)

== Judo ==
Spain qualified seven judoka (three men and four women) for each of the following weight classes at the Games. Six of them, highlighted by Georgian-born and two-time world champion Nikoloz Sherazadishvili (men's middleweight, 90 kg) and Rio 2016 Olympians Francisco Garrigós (men's extra-lightweight, 60 kg) and María Bernabéu (women's middleweight, 70 kg), were selected among the top 18 judoka of their respective weight classes based on the IJF World Ranking List of 28 June 2021, while Cristina Cabaña (women's half-middleweight, 73 kg) accepted a continental berth from Europe as the nation's top-ranked judoka outside of direct qualifying position.

Men

Athlete	Event	Round of 64	Round of 32	Round of 16	Quarterfinals	Semifinals	Repechage	Final / BM	
Athlete	Event	Opposition Result	Opposition Result	Opposition Result	Opposition Result	Opposition Result	Opposition Result	Opposition Result	Rank
Francisco Garrigós	−60 kg	—N/a	Bye	Mkheidze (FRA); L 00–01	Did not advance				
Alberto Gaitero	−66 kg	—N/a	Zantaraia (UKR); L 00–10	Did not advance					
Nikoloz Sherazadishvili	−90 kg	Bye	Gantulg (MGL); W 01–00	Nyman (SWE); W 10–00	Igolnikov (ROC); L 00–10	Did not advance	Bobonov (UZB); L 00–01	Did not advance	7

Women

Athlete	Event	Round of 32	Round of 16	Quarterfinals	Semifinals	Repechage	Final / BM	
Athlete	Event	Opposition Result	Opposition Result	Opposition Result	Opposition Result	Opposition Result	Opposition Result	Rank
Julia Figueroa	−48 kg	Şentürk (TUR); W 10–00	Rishony (ISR); L 00–10	Did not advance				
Ana Pérez Box	−52 kg	Kocher (SUI); L 00–01	Did not advance					
Cristina Cabaña	−63 kg	Watanabe (PHI); W 10–00	Trstenjak (SLO); L 00–10	Did not advance				
María Bernabéu	−70 kg	Taimazova (RUS); L 00–01	Did not advance					

== Karate ==
Spain entered two karateka into the inaugural Olympic tournament. Defending European Games champions Damián Quintero and Sandra Sánchez qualified directly for their respective individual kata categories by finishing among the top four karateka at the end of the combined WKF Olympic Rankings.

Kata

Athlete	Event	Elimination round		Ranking round		Final / BM	
Athlete	Event	Score	Rank	Score	Rank	Opposition Result	Rank
Damián Quintero	Men's kata	27.37	1 Q	27.28	1 Q	Kiyuna (JPN); L 27.66–28.72	2nd place, silver medalist(s)
Sandra Sánchez	Women's kata	27.43	1 Q	27.86	1 Q	Shimizu (JPN); W 28.06–27.88	1st place, gold medalist(s)

== Modern pentathlon ==
Spain entered one modern pentathlete into the Olympic competition for the first time since Beijing 2008. Aleix Heredia finished sixth of the top eight modern pentathletes vying for qualification in the men's event based on the UIPM World Rankings of 1 June 2021.

Athlete	Event	Fencing (épée one touch)				Swimming (200 m freestyle)			Riding (show jumping)			Combined: shooting/running (10 m air pistol)/(3200 m)			Total points	Final rank
Athlete	Event	RR	BR	Rank	MP points	Time	Rank	MP points	Time	Rank	MP points	Time	Rank	MP points	Total points	Final rank
Aleix Heredia	Men's	16–19	4	23	200	2:07.78	33	295	14	15	286	11:34.52	23	606	1387	23

== Rowing ==
Spain qualified three boats for each of the following rowing classes into the Olympic regatta, with the majority of crews confirming Olympic places for their boats at the 2019 FISA World Championships in Ottensheim, Austria.

Athlete	Event	Heats		Repechage		Semifinals		Final	
Athlete	Event	Time	Rank	Time	Rank	Time	Rank	Time	Rank
Jaime Canalejo; Javier García	Men's pair	6:53.33	4 R	6:47.06	1 SA/B	6:16.25	3 FA	6:25.25	6
Manel Balastegui; Caetano Horta	Men's lightweight double sculls	6:38.72	4 R	6:45.71	2 SA/B	6:15.49	5 FB	6:15.45	7
Aina Cid; Virginia Díaz	Women's pair	7:23.14	3 SA/B	Bye		6:50.63	3 FA	7:00.05	6

Qualification Legend: FA=Final A (medal); FB=Final B (non-medal); FC=Final C (non-medal); FD=Final D (non-medal); FE=Final E (non-medal); FF=Final F (non-medal); SA/B=Semifinals A/B; SC/D=Semifinals C/D; SE/F=Semifinals E/F; QF=Quarterfinals; R=Repechage

== Sailing ==
Spanish sailors qualified one boat in each of the following classes through the 2018 Sailing World Championships, the class-associated Worlds, and the continental regattas.

At the end of 2019 season, the Royal Spanish Sailing Federation announced the first set of sailors to compete at the Enoshima regatta, namely windsurfer Blanca Manchón, Rio 2016 Olympian Jordi Xammar and his new partner Nicolás Rodríguez in the men's 470 class. The 49er, 49erFX, and Nacra 17 crews, highlighted by London 2012 gold medalist Támara Echegoyen, were named on 19 February 2020, with the women's 470 crew joining them before the end of March 2020. Ángel Granda (men's RS:X) was added to the list of confirmed Spanish athletes for the rescheduled Games on 16 March 2021, with Cristina Pujol (women's Laser Radial) rounded out the selection a month later.

Men

Athlete	Event	Race													Net points	Final rank
Athlete	Event	1	2	3	4	5	6	7	8	9	10	11	12	M*	Net points	Final rank
Ángel Granda	RS:X	2	3	13	14	13	17	15	9	10	~~18~~	7	8	10	118	10
Joel Rodríguez	Laser	21	4	23	13	9	25	9	10	~~27~~	21	—N/a		EL	135	16
Joan Cardona	Finn	3	3	5	3	2	3	~~13~~	7	8	5	—N/a		6	51	3rd place, bronze medalist(s)
Nicolás Rodríguez; Jordi Xammar	470	10	1	10	6	~~14~~	1	3	2	5	7	—N/a		10	55	3rd place, bronze medalist(s)
Diego Botín; Iago López	49er	5	1	2	5	4	10	~~15~~	2	5	4	12	6	7	70	4

Women

Athlete	Event	Race													Net points	Final rank
Athlete	Event	1	2	3	4	5	6	7	8	9	10	11	12	M*	Net points	Final rank
Blanca Manchón	RS:X	7	7	12	14	13	~~16~~	14	9	14	14	10	10	EL	124	11
Cristina Pujol	Laser Radial	1	23	23	28	24	26	30	~~33~~	20	4	—N/a		EL	179	23
Patricia Cantero; Silvia Mas	470	11	13	3	6	14	15	8	~~17~~	1	10	—N/a		EL	81	11
Paula Barceló; Támara Echegoyen	49erFX	2	10	~~22~~	2	3	3	13	4	5	19	12	4	12	89	4

Mixed

Athlete	Event	Race													Net points	Final rank
Athlete	Event	1	2	3	4	5	6	7	8	9	10	11	12	M*	Net points	Final rank
Florián Trittel; Tara Pacheco	Nacra 17	4	6	6	10	6	3	7	1	7	9	~~13~~	3	14	76	6

M = Medal race; EL = Eliminated – did not advance into the medal race

== Shooting ==
Spanish shooters achieved quota places for the following events by virtue of their best finishes at the 2018 ISSF World Championships, the 2019 ISSF World Cup series, European Championships or Games, and European Qualifying Tournament, as long as they obtained a minimum qualifying score (MQS) by 31 May 2020.

Athlete	Event	Qualification		Final	
Athlete	Event	Points	Rank	Points	Rank
Alberto Fernández	Men's trap	122	9	Did not advance	
Fátima Gálvez	Women's trap	116	14	Did not advance	
Alberto Fernández; Fátima Gálvez	Mixed trap team	148	1 Q	41	1st place, gold medalist(s)

== Skateboarding ==
Spain entered four skateboarders (two men and two women) to compete across all events at the Games. Danny León, Jaime Mateu, and Julia Benedetti were automatically selected among the top 16 eligible skateboarders in the men's and women's park, respectively, based on the World Skate Olympic Rankings of 30 June 2021. Andrea Benítez later replaced the skateboarder Candy Jacobs after she tested positive in COVID-19 and had to withdraw from the Games.

Athlete	Event	Qualification		Final	
Athlete	Event	Points	Rank	Points	Rank
Danny León	Men's park	73.24	9	Did not advance	
Jaime Mateu	Men's park	69.18	10	Did not advance	
Julia Benedetti	Women's park	27.76	16	Did not advance	
Andrea Benítez	Women's street	5.96	15	Did not advance	

== Sport climbing ==
Spain entered one sport climber into the Olympic tournament. Alberto Ginés qualified directly for the men's combined event, by advancing to the final and securing one of the six provisional berths at the IFSC World Olympic Qualifying Event in Toulouse, France.

Athlete	Event	Qualification									Final								
Athlete	Event	Speed		Boulder		Lead			Total	Rank	Speed		Boulder		Lead			Total	Rank
Athlete	Event	Best	Place	Result	Place	Hold	Time	Place	Total	Rank	Best	Place	Result	Place	Hold	Time	Place	Total	Rank
Alberto Ginés López	Men's	6.32	7	1T1z 12 4	14	41+	—	3	294.00	6 Q	6.42	1	0T3z 0 9	7	38+	—	4	28	1st place, gold medalist(s)

== Swimming ==
Spanish swimmers further achieved qualifying standards in the following events (up to a maximum of 2 swimmers in each event at the Olympic Qualifying Time (OQT), and potentially 1 at the Olympic Selection Time (OST)): To assure their selection to the Spanish roster, swimmers must attain the Olympic qualifying cut in the final (or in heat-declared winner races on time for long-distance freestyle) of each individual pool event at one of three domestic meets sanctioned by FINA and the Royal Spanish Swimming Federation (RFEN): the International Castalia-Castellón Trophy (8–9 December 2020 in Castellón), the Spanish Open (24–28 March 2021 in Sabadell), and the European Championships (17–23 May 2021 in Budapest), if necessary and available.

Additionally, open water swimmers Alberto Martínez and Paula Ruiz secured their berths, the first at the 2019 FINA World Championships in Gwangju, South Korea, and the later at the 2021 FINA Olympic Marathon Swim Qualifier in Setúbal, Portugal .

Men

Athlete	Event	Heat		Semifinal		Final	
Athlete	Event	Time	Rank	Time	Rank	Time	Rank
Nicolás García	200 m backstroke	1:57.62	13 Q	1:56.35	5 Q	1:59.06	8
Hugo González	100 m backstroke	53.45	9 Q	53.05	7 Q	52.78	6
Hugo González	200 m individual medley	1:57.61	11 Q	1:57.96	11	Did not advance	
Alberto Martínez	10 km open water	—N/a				1:53:16.4	18
Joan Lluís Pons	400 m individual medley	4:12.67	15	—N/a		Did not advance	

Women

Athlete	Event	Heat		Semifinal		Final	
Athlete	Event	Time	Rank	Time	Rank	Time	Rank
Mireia Belmonte	800 m freestyle	8:26.71	14	—N/a		Did not advance	
Mireia Belmonte	1500 m freestyle	16:11.68	15	—N/a		Did not advance	
Mireia Belmonte	400 m individual medley	4:35.88	4 Q	—N/a		4:35.13	4
Marina García	200 m breaststroke	2:26.21	22	Did not advance			
Lidón Muñoz	50 m freestyle	25.10	23	Did not advance			
Lidón Muñoz	100 m freestyle	54.97	27	Did not advance			
Jimena Pérez	800 m freestyle	8:33.98	21	—N/a		Did not advance	
Jimena Pérez	1500 m freestyle	16:15.99	18	—N/a		Did not advance	
Paula Ruiz	10 km open water	—N/a				2:03:17.6	16
Jessica Vall	100 m breaststroke	1:07.07	18	Did not advance			
Jessica Vall	200 m breaststroke	2:23.31	10 Q	2:24.87	13	Did not advance	
África Zamorano	200 m backstroke	2:10.72	14 Q	2:10.42	13	Did not advance	
África Zamorano	200 m individual medley	2:13.81	20	Did not advance			
Mireia Belmonte; Lidón Muñoz; Jessica Vall; África Zamorano	4 × 100 m medley relay	4:04.14	16	—N/a		Did not advance	

== Table tennis ==
Spain entered three athletes into the table tennis competition at the Games. Álvaro Robles scored a second-stage final triumph to secure one of the five available places in the men's singles, while Maria Xiao booked the last of four women's singles spots with a third-stage final victory at the European Qualification Tournament in Odivelas, Portugal. Three-time Olympian Galia Dvorak was automatically selected among the top ten table tennis players vying for qualification to join Xiao in the same event based on the ITTF Olympic Rankings of 1 June 2021.

Athlete	Event	Preliminary	Round 1	Round 2	Round 3	Round of 16	Quarterfinals	Semifinals	Final / BM	
Athlete	Event	Opposition Result	Opposition Result	Opposition Result	Opposition Result	Opposition Result	Opposition Result	Opposition Result	Opposition Result	Rank
Álvaro Robles	Men's singles	Bye	Alto (ARG); W 4–1	Jorgić (SLO); L 3–4	Did not advance					
Galia Dvorak	Women's singles	Bye	Liu (USA); L 1–4	Did not advance						
María Xiao	Women's singles	Bye	Lavrova (KAZ); W 4–0	Soo (HKG); W 4–2	Feng Tw (SIN); L 1–4	Did not advance				

== Taekwondo ==
Spain entered four athletes into the taekwondo competition at the Games. Rio 2016 Olympian Jesús Tortosa (men's 58 kg), Javier Pérez (men's 68 kg), and Raúl Martínez (men's 80 kg) qualified directly for their respective weight classes by finishing among the top five taekwondo practitioners at the end of the WT Olympic Rankings, although Jesús Tortosa was later replaced by Adrián Vicente following a technical decision of the Spanish Federation of Taekwondo. Meanwhile, 17-year-old Adriana Cerezo scored a semifinal victory in the women's flyweight category (49 kg) to book the remaining spot on the Spanish taekwondo squad at the 2021 European Qualification Tournament in Sofia, Bulgaria.

Athlete	Event	Round of 16	Quarterfinals	Semifinals	Repechage	Final / BM	
Athlete	Event	Opposition Result	Opposition Result	Opposition Result	Opposition Result	Opposition Result	Rank
Adrián Vicente	Men's −58 kg	Bragança (POR); W 24–9	Jang J (KOR); L 19–24	Did not advance			
Javier Pérez	Men's −68 kg	Wael (EGY); L 20–22	Did not advance				
Raúl Martínez	Men's −80 kg	Kanaet (CRO); L 15–21	Did not advance				
Adriana Cerezo	Women's −49 kg	Bogdanović (SRB); W 12–4	Wu Jy (CHN); W 33–2	Yıldırım (TUR); W 39–19	Bye	Wongpattanakit (THA); L 10–11	2nd place, silver medalist(s)

== Tennis ==
Spain entered eight tennis players (four per gender) into the Olympic tournament. Pablo Carreño (world no. 12), Alejandro Davidovich (world no. 35), and Pablo Andújar (world no. 70), with Roberto Carballés (world no. 100) replacing the world-number-three tennis player and two-time gold medalist Rafael Nadal to take the fourth slot, qualified directly among the top 56 eligible players in the men's singles based on the ATP World Rankings. Garbiñe Muguruza (world no. 13), Paula Badosa (world no. 33), and Sara Sorribes (world no. 53), with the veteran Carla Suárez Navarro earning her fourth consecutive trip to the Games, occupied the four of the 56 available slots to compete in the women's singles based on their WTA World Rankings of 13 June 2021.

Men

Athlete	Event	Round of 64	Round of 32	Round of 16	Quarterfinals	Semifinals	Final / BM	
Athlete	Event	Opposition Score	Opposition Score	Opposition Score	Opposition Score	Opposition Score	Opposition Score	Rank
Pablo Andújar	Singles	Humbert (FRA); L 6–7^{(3–7)}, 1–6	Did not advance					
Roberto Carballés	Singles	Basilashvili (GEO); L 3–6, 2–6	Did not advance					
Pablo Carreño	Singles	Sandgren (USA); W 7–5, 6–2	Čilić (CRO); W 5–7, 6–4, 6–4	Koepfer (GER); W 7–6^{(9–7)}, 6–3	Medvedev (ROC); W 6–2, 7–6^{(7–5)}	Khachanov (ROC); L 3–6, 3–6	Djokovic (SRB); W 6–4, 6–7^{(6–8)}, 6–3	3rd place, bronze medalist(s)
Alejandro Davidovich	Singles	Sousa (POR); W 6–3, 6–0	Millman (AUS); W 6–4, 6–7^{(4–7)}, 6–3	Djokovic (SRB); L 3–6, 1–6	Did not advance			
Pablo Andújar; Roberto Carballés	Doubles	—N/a	Musetti / Sonego (ITA); L 5–7, 4–6	Did not advance				
Pablo Carreño; Alejandro Davidovich	Doubles	—N/a	Cabal / Farah (COL); L 2–6, 4–6	Did not advance				

Women

Athlete	Event	Round of 64	Round of 32	Round of 16	Quarterfinals	Semifinals	Final / BM	
Athlete	Event	Opposition Score	Opposition Score	Opposition Score	Opposition Score	Opposition Score	Opposition Score	Rank
Paula Badosa	Singles	Mladenovic (FRA); W 6–7^{(4–7)}, 6–3, 6–0	Świątek (POL); W 6–3, 7–6^{(7–4)}	Podoroska (ARG); W 6–2, 6–3	Vondroušová (CZE); L 3–6, ret	Did not advance		
Garbiñe Muguruza	Singles	Kudermetova (ROC); W 7–5, 7–5	Wang (CHN); W 6–3, 6–0	Van Uytvanck (BEL); W 6–4, 6–1	Rybakina (KAZ); L 5–7, 1–6	Did not advance		
Sara Sorribes	Singles	Barty (AUS); W 6–4, 6–3	Ferro (FRA); W 6–1, 6–4	Pavlyuchenkova (ROC); L 1–6, 3–6	Did not advance			
Carla Suárez Navarro	Singles	Jabeur (TUN); W 6–4, 6–1	Plíšková (CZE); L 3–6, 7–6^{(7–0)}, 1–6	Did not advance				
Paula Badosa; Sara Sorribes	Doubles	—N/a	Olmos / Zarazúa (MEX); W 6–2, 6–7^{(4–7)}, [10–7]	Krejčíková / Siniaková (CZE); L 6–2, 5–7, [5–10]	Did not advance			
Garbiñe Muguruza; Carla Suárez Navarro	Doubles	—N/a	Mertens / Van Uytvanck (BEL); W 6–3, 7–6^{(7–4)}	Bencic / Golubic (SUI); L 6–3, 1–6, [9–11]	Did not advance			

== Triathlon ==
Spain entered five triathletes (three men and two women) to compete at the Olympics. London 2012 silver medalist Javier Gómez Noya, along with Rio 2016 Olympians Fernando Alarza and Mario Mola, was selected among the top 26 triathletes vying for qualification in the men's event based on the individual ITU World Rankings of 15 June 2021, with Miriam Casillas and rookie Anna Godoy taking the two slots on the women's side.

Athlete	Event	Time						Rank
Athlete	Event	Swim (1.5 km)	Trans 1	Bike (40 km)	Trans 2	Run (10 km)	Total	Rank
Fernando Alarza	Men's	18:20	0:38	56:09	0:33	30:42	1:46:22	12
Javier Gómez Noya	Men's	18:22	0:38	56:05	0:33	32:08	1:47:46	25
Mario Mola	Men's	18:21	0:38	56:06	0:33	30:38	1:46:13	10
Miriam Casillas	Women's	19:46	0:42	1:04:50	0:34	36:00	2:01:52	21
Anna Godoy	Women's	20:12	0:44	Lapped				

Relay

Athlete	Event	Time						Rank
Athlete	Event	Swim (300 m)	Trans 1	Bike (7 km)	Trans 2	Run (2 km)	Total group	Rank
Fernando Alarza	Mixed relay	4:05	0:39	9:51	0:26	5:32	20:33	—N/a
Mario Mola	Mixed relay	4:05	0:36	9:51	0:27	5:29	20:28	—N/a
Miriam Casillas	Mixed relay	4:33	0:38	10:50	0:31	6:50	23:22	—N/a
Anna Godoy	Mixed relay	3:46	0:40	10:38	0:31	6:33	22:08	—N/a
Total	Mixed relay	—N/a					1:26:31	10

== Volleyball ==
=== Beach ===
Spain women's beach volleyball pair qualified for the Games by advancing to the final match and securing an outright berth at the 2019 FIVB World Olympic Qualifying Tournament in Haiyang, China; Meanwhile, the men's beach volleyball pair received an automatic spot for the tournament by virtue of their nation's top 15 placement in the FIVB Olympic Rankings of 13 June 2021.

Athlete	Event	Preliminary round				Repechage	Round of 16	Quarterfinals	Semifinals	Final / BM	
Athlete	Event	Opposition Score	Opposition Score	Opposition Score	Rank	Opposition Score	Opposition Score	Opposition Score	Opposition Score	Opposition Score	Rank
Adrián Gavira; Pablo Herrera	Men's	Leshukov / Semenov (ROC); L (19–21, 20–22)	Mol / Sørum (NOR); L (17–21, 22–24)	McHugh / Schumann (AUS); W (21–16, 21–16)	3 R	Kantor / Łosiak (POL); W (31–29, 19–21, 15–7)	Krasilnikov / Stoyanovskiy (ROC); L (20–22, 17–21)	Did not advance			
Elsa Baquerizo; Liliana Fernández	Women's	Keizer / Meppelink (NED); W (19–21, 21–18, 16–14)	Klineman / Ross (USA); L (13–21, 16–21)	Wang Xx / Xue C (CHN); L (13–21, 10–21)	3 R	Ishii / Murakami (JPN); W (21–15, 21–10)	Pavan / Humana-Paredes (CAN); L (13–21, 13–21)	Did not advance			

== Water polo ==
Summary

Key:
- FT – After full time.
- P – Match decided by penalty-shootout.

Team	Event	Group stage						Quarterfinal	Semifinal	Final / BM	
Team	Event	Opposition Score	Opposition Score	Opposition Score	Opposition Score	Opposition Score	Rank	Opposition Score	Opposition Score	Opposition Score	Rank
Spain men's	Men's tournament	Serbia; W 13–12	Montenegro; W 8–6	Kazakhstan; W 16–4	Australia; W 16–5	Croatia; W 8–4	1 Q	United States; W 12–8	Serbia; L 9–10	Hungary; L 5–9	4
Spain women's	Women's tournament	South Africa; W 29–4	Canada; W 14–10	Netherlands; L 13–14	Australia; W 15–9	—N/a	1 Q	China; W 11–7	Hungary; W 8–6	United States; L 5–14	2nd place, silver medalist(s)

=== Men's tournament ===
Spain men's water polo team qualified for the Olympics by advancing to the final match and securing an outright berth at the 2019 FINA World Championships in Gwangju, South Korea.

Team roster

Spain's final squad was announced on 9 July 2021.

Head coach: David Martín

No.	Player	Pos.	L/R	Height	Weight	Date of birth (age)	Apps	OG/ Goals	Club	Ref
1	Daniel López	GK	R	1.90 m (6 ft 3 in)	90 kg (198 lb)	16 July 1980 (aged 41)	348	2/0	(Spain) Barceloneta	
2	Alberto Munárriz	D	R	1.97 m (6 ft 6 in)	106 kg (234 lb)	19 May 1994 (aged 27)	128	1/9	(Spain) Barceloneta	
3	Álvaro Granados	D	R	1.92 m (6 ft 4 in)	86 kg (190 lb)	8 October 1998 (aged 22)	68	1/0	(Spain) Barceloneta	
4	Bernat Sanahuja	D	R	1.92 m (6 ft 4 in)	86 kg (190 lb)	21 October 2000 (aged 20)	23	0/0	(Spain) Sabadell	
5	Miguel de Toro	CF	R	2.02 m (6 ft 8 in)	110 kg (243 lb)	16 August 1993 (aged 27)	73	0/0	(Spain) Barceloneta	
6	Marc Larumbe	D	R	1.93 m (6 ft 4 in)	94 kg (207 lb)	30 May 1994 (aged 27)	84	0/0	(Spain) Barceloneta	
7	Martin Famera	CB	R	2.00 m (6 ft 7 in)	109 kg (240 lb)	4 November 1988 (aged 32)	5	0/0	(Spain) Barceloneta	
8	Francisco Fernández	D	R	1.85 m (6 ft 1 in)	84 kg (185 lb)	21 June 1986 (aged 35)	153	1/2	(Spain) Barceloneta	
9	Roger Tahull	CF	R	1.96 m (6 ft 5 in)	104 kg (229 lb)	11 May 1997 (aged 24)	65	1/3	(Spain) Barcelona	
10	Felipe Perrone (C)	D	R	1.83 m (6 ft 0 in)	96 kg (212 lb)	27 February 1986 (aged 35)	172	3/42	(Spain) Barceloneta	
11	Blai Mallarach	D	L	1.87 m (6 ft 2 in)	87 kg (192 lb)	21 August 1987 (aged 33)	285	2/13	(Spain) Barceloneta	
12	Alejandro Bustos	CB	R	1.93 m (6 ft 4 in)	106 kg (234 lb)	17 March 1997 (aged 24)	10	0/0	(Spain) Barceloneta	
13	Unai Aguirre	GK	R	1.92 m (6 ft 4 in)	81 kg (179 lb)	14 July 2002 (aged 19)	3	0/0	(Spain) Barcelona	
Average				1.92 m (6 ft 4 in)	95 kg (209 lb)	28 years, 211 days	109			

Note: Age as of 23 July 2021
Source: Spain Men | Tokyo 2020 Olympics Archived 2021-07-22 at the Wayback Machine

Group play

Pos	Team	Pld	W	D	L	GF	GA	GD	Pts	Qualification
1	Spain	5	5	0	0	61	31	+30	10	Quarterfinals
2	Croatia	5	3	0	2	62	46	+16	6 (Note: Croatia 14–12 Serbia)	Quarterfinals
3	Serbia	5	3	0	2	70	46	+24	6	Quarterfinals
4	Montenegro	5	2	0	3	54	56	−2	4 (Note: Australia 10–15 Montenegro)	Quarterfinals
5	Australia	5	2	0	3	49	60	−11	4	
6	Kazakhstan	5	0	0	5	35	92	−57	0	

Source: Tokyo 2020 and FINA
Rules for classification: 1) Points; 2) Head-to-head points; 3) Head-to-head goal difference; 4) Head-to-head goals scored; 5) Goal difference.
Notes:

25 July 2021; 18:20 v	Report	Serbia	12–13	Spain	Tokyo Tatsumi International Swimming Center; Referees: Michael Goldenberg (USA), Georgios Stavridis (GRE)
25 July 2021; 18:20 v	Report	Score by quarters: 3–3, 3–5, 3–2, 3–3			Tokyo Tatsumi International Swimming Center; Referees: Michael Goldenberg (USA), Georgios Stavridis (GRE)
25 July 2021; 18:20 v	Report	four players 2	Goals	Munarriz 4	Tokyo Tatsumi International Swimming Center; Referees: Michael Goldenberg (USA), Georgios Stavridis (GRE)

27 July 2021; 11:30 v	Report	Montenegro	6–8	Spain	Tokyo Tatsumi International Swimming Center; Referees: Sébastien Dervieux (FRA), Georgios Stavridis (GRE)
27 July 2021; 11:30 v	Report	Score by quarters: 2–3, 1–2, 2–2, 1–1			Tokyo Tatsumi International Swimming Center; Referees: Sébastien Dervieux (FRA), Georgios Stavridis (GRE)
27 July 2021; 11:30 v	Report	Matković 3	Goals	three players 2	Tokyo Tatsumi International Swimming Center; Referees: Sébastien Dervieux (FRA), Georgios Stavridis (GRE)

29 July 2021; 11:30 v	Report	Spain	16–4	Kazakhstan	Tokyo Tatsumi International Swimming Center; Referees: Michael Goldenberg (USA), Dion Willis (RSA)
29 July 2021; 11:30 v	Report	Score by quarters: 3–0, 3–0, 5–2, 5–2			Tokyo Tatsumi International Swimming Center; Referees: Michael Goldenberg (USA), Dion Willis (RSA)
29 July 2021; 11:30 v	Report	Granados 5	Goals	Vuksanović 2	Tokyo Tatsumi International Swimming Center; Referees: Michael Goldenberg (USA), Dion Willis (RSA)

31 July 2021; 11:30 v	Report	Australia	5–16	Spain	Tokyo Tatsumi International Swimming Center; Referees: Adrian Alexandrescu (ROU), Sébastien Dervieux (FRA)
31 July 2021; 11:30 v	Report	Score by quarters: 2–4, 1–4, 2–5, 0–3			Tokyo Tatsumi International Swimming Center; Referees: Adrian Alexandrescu (ROU), Sébastien Dervieux (FRA)
31 July 2021; 11:30 v	Report	Edwards, Younger 2	Goals	Granados 4	Tokyo Tatsumi International Swimming Center; Referees: Adrian Alexandrescu (ROU), Sébastien Dervieux (FRA)

2 August 2021; 15:30 v	Report	Spain	8–4	Croatia	Tokyo Tatsumi International Swimming Center; Referees: Georgios Stavridis (GRE), György Kun (HUN)
2 August 2021; 15:30 v	Report	Score by quarters: 2–1, 1–0, 4–2, 1–1			Tokyo Tatsumi International Swimming Center; Referees: Georgios Stavridis (GRE), György Kun (HUN)
2 August 2021; 15:30 v	Report	Granados 2	Goals	Bukić 2	Tokyo Tatsumi International Swimming Center; Referees: Georgios Stavridis (GRE), György Kun (HUN)

Quarterfinal

4 August 2021; 14:00 v	Report	United States	8–12	Spain	Tokyo Tatsumi International Swimming Center; Referees: Michiel Zwart (NED), György Kun (HUN)
4 August 2021; 14:00 v	Report	Score by quarters: 3–3, 3–3, 0–1, 2–5			Tokyo Tatsumi International Swimming Center; Referees: Michiel Zwart (NED), György Kun (HUN)
4 August 2021; 14:00 v	Report	Daube 3	Goals	four players 2	Tokyo Tatsumi International Swimming Center; Referees: Michiel Zwart (NED), György Kun (HUN)

Semifinal

6 August 2021; 19:50 v	Report	Serbia	10–9	Spain	Tokyo Tatsumi International Swimming Center; Referees: Adrian Alexandrescu (ROU), Michiel Zwart (NED)
6 August 2021; 19:50 v	Report	Score by quarters: 2–0, 2–5, 1–2, 5–2			Tokyo Tatsumi International Swimming Center; Referees: Adrian Alexandrescu (ROU), Michiel Zwart (NED)
6 August 2021; 19:50 v	Report	Mandić 3	Goals	three players 2	Tokyo Tatsumi International Swimming Center; Referees: Adrian Alexandrescu (ROU), Michiel Zwart (NED)

Bronze medal game

8 August 2021; 13:40 v	Report	Hungary	9–5	Spain	Tokyo Tatsumi International Swimming Center; Referees: Arkadiy Voevodin (RUS), Georgios Stavridis (GRE)
8 August 2021; 13:40 v	Report	Score by quarters: 3–3, 2–2, 1–0, 3–0			Tokyo Tatsumi International Swimming Center; Referees: Arkadiy Voevodin (RUS), Georgios Stavridis (GRE)
8 August 2021; 13:40 v	Report	Vámos 2	Goals	Munárriz 2	Tokyo Tatsumi International Swimming Center; Referees: Arkadiy Voevodin (RUS), Georgios Stavridis (GRE)

=== Women's tournament ===
Spain women's water polo team qualified for the Olympics by advancing to the final match and securing an outright berth, as the next highest-ranked squad, at the 2019 FINA World Championships in Gwangju, South Korea.

Team roster

Spain's final squad was announced on 9 July 2021.

Head coach: Miki Oca

No.	Player	Pos.	L/R	Height	Weight	Date of birth (age)	Apps	OG/ Goals	Club	Ref
1	Laura Ester	GK	R	1.72 m (5 ft 8 in)	58 kg (128 lb)	22 January 1990 (aged 31)	309	2/0	(Spain) Sabadell	
2	Marta Bach	CB	R	1.76 m (5 ft 9 in)	67 kg (148 lb)	17 February 1993 (aged 28)	232	2/0	(Spain) Mataró	
3	Anni Espar	D	R	1.80 m (5 ft 11 in)	66 kg (146 lb)	8 January 1993 (aged 28)	259	2/22	(Spain) Mataró	
4	Beatriz Ortiz	D	R	1.76 m (5 ft 9 in)	64 kg (141 lb)	21 June 1995 (aged 26)	118	1/6	(Spain) Terrassa	
5	Elena Ruiz	D	R	1.70 m (5 ft 7 in)	66 kg (146 lb)	29 October 2004 (aged 16)	0	0/0	(Spain) Rubí	
6	Irene González	CB	R	1.70 m (5 ft 7 in)	64 kg (141 lb)	23 July 1996 (aged 25)	18	0/0	(Spain) Sabadell	
7	Clara Espar	D	R	1.77 m (5 ft 10 in)	68 kg (150 lb)	29 September 1994 (aged 26)	133	1/0	(Spain) Mediterrani	
8	Pili Peña (C)	D	L	1.75 m (5 ft 9 in)	63 kg (139 lb)	4 April 1986 (aged 35)	433	2/8	(Spain) Terrassa	
9	Judith Forca	D	L	1.73 m (5 ft 8 in)	70 kg (154 lb)	7 June 1996 (aged 25)	116	1/7	(Spain) Sabadell	
10	Roser Tarragó	D	R	1.71 m (5 ft 7 in)	62 kg (137 lb)	25 March 1993 (aged 28)	189	2/20	(Spain) Mediterrani	
11	Maica García	CF	R	1.88 m (6 ft 2 in)	90 kg (198 lb)	17 October 1990 (aged 30)	322	2/20	(Spain) Sabadell	
12	Paula Leitón	CF	R	1.89 m (6 ft 2 in)	98 kg (216 lb)	27 April 2000 (aged 21)	111	1/2	(Spain) Terrassa	
13	Elena Sánchez	GK	R	1.77 m (5 ft 10 in)	64 kg (141 lb)	22 October 1994 (aged 26)	88	0/0	(Spain) Mataró	
Average				1.76 m (5 ft 9 in)	69 kg (152 lb)	26 years, 354 days	179			

Note: Age as of 23 July 2021
Source: Spain Women | Tokyo 2020 Olympics Archived 2021-07-22 at the Wayback Machine

Group play

Pos	Team	Pld	W	D	L	GF	GA	GD	Pts	Qualification
1	Spain	4	3	0	1	71	37	+34	6 (Note: Spain 2 Pts, +5 GD; Netherlands 2 Pts, −2 GD; Australia 2 Pts, −3 GD. Spain first and after that the head-to head results between Australia and Netherlands (15–12) came into effect.)	Quarterfinals
2	Australia	4	3	0	1	46	33	+13	6	Quarterfinals
3	Netherlands	4	3	0	1	75	41	+34	6	Quarterfinals
4	Canada	4	1	0	3	48	39	+9	2	Quarterfinals
5	South Africa	4	0	0	4	7	97	−90	0	

Source: Tokyo 2020 and FINA
Rules for classification: 1) Points; 2) Head-to-head points; 3) Head-to-head goal difference; 4) Head-to-head goals scored; 5) Goal difference.
Notes:

24 July 2021; 18:20 v	Report	South Africa	4–29	Spain	Tokyo Tatsumi International Swimming Center; Referees: Asumi Tsuzaki (JPN), Ursula Wengenroth (SUI)
24 July 2021; 18:20 v	Report	Score by quarters: 2–5, 1–9, 1–5, 0–10			Tokyo Tatsumi International Swimming Center; Referees: Asumi Tsuzaki (JPN), Ursula Wengenroth (SUI)
24 July 2021; 18:20 v	Report	Wedderburn 2	Goals	Ruiz 5	Tokyo Tatsumi International Swimming Center; Referees: Asumi Tsuzaki (JPN), Ursula Wengenroth (SUI)

26 July 2021; 19:50 v	Report	Spain	14–10	Canada	Tokyo Tatsumi International Swimming Center; Referees: Georgios Stavridis (GRE), Nenad Periš (CRO)
26 July 2021; 19:50 v	Report	Score by quarters: 4–2, 2–2, 3–2, 5–3			Tokyo Tatsumi International Swimming Center; Referees: Georgios Stavridis (GRE), Nenad Periš (CRO)
26 July 2021; 19:50 v	Report	Ortiz 4	Goals	Lemay-Lavoie 3	Tokyo Tatsumi International Swimming Center; Referees: Georgios Stavridis (GRE), Nenad Periš (CRO)

28 July 2021; 19:50 v	Report	Netherlands	14–13	Spain	Tokyo Tatsumi International Swimming Center; Referees: Sébastien Dervieux (FRA), Michael Goldenberg (USA)
28 July 2021; 19:50 v	Report	Score by quarters: 2–3, 3–2, 3–2, 6–6			Tokyo Tatsumi International Swimming Center; Referees: Sébastien Dervieux (FRA), Michael Goldenberg (USA)
28 July 2021; 19:50 v	Report	Van de Kraats 6	Goals	A. Espar 4	Tokyo Tatsumi International Swimming Center; Referees: Sébastien Dervieux (FRA), Michael Goldenberg (USA)

30 July 2021; 19:50 v	Report	Spain	15–9	Australia	Tokyo Tatsumi International Swimming Center; Referees: Sébastien Dervieux (FRA), Arkadii Voevodin (RUS)
30 July 2021; 19:50 v	Report	Score by quarters: 3–3, 4–3, 4–1, 4–2			Tokyo Tatsumi International Swimming Center; Referees: Sébastien Dervieux (FRA), Arkadii Voevodin (RUS)
30 July 2021; 19:50 v	Report	Ortiz 5	Goals	Kearns, Webster 2	Tokyo Tatsumi International Swimming Center; Referees: Sébastien Dervieux (FRA), Arkadii Voevodin (RUS)

Quarterfinal

3 August 2021; 15:30 v	Report	Spain	11–7	China	Tokyo Tatsumi International Swimming Center; Referees: Sébastien Dervieux (FRA), Michael Goldenberg (USA)
3 August 2021; 15:30 v	Report	Score by quarters: 5–2, 4–3, 2–1, 0–1			Tokyo Tatsumi International Swimming Center; Referees: Sébastien Dervieux (FRA), Michael Goldenberg (USA)
3 August 2021; 15:30 v	Report	Forca 4	Goals	Deng 2	Tokyo Tatsumi International Swimming Center; Referees: Sébastien Dervieux (FRA), Michael Goldenberg (USA)

Semifinal

5 August 2021; 19:50 v	Report	Spain	8–6	Hungary	Tokyo Tatsumi International Swimming Center; Referees: Nenad Periš (CRO), Vojin Putniković (SRB)
5 August 2021; 19:50 v	Report	Score by quarters: 2–0, 3–2, 3–2, 0–2			Tokyo Tatsumi International Swimming Center; Referees: Nenad Periš (CRO), Vojin Putniković (SRB)
5 August 2021; 19:50 v	Report	A. Espar 3	Goals	Szilágyi 3	Tokyo Tatsumi International Swimming Center; Referees: Nenad Periš (CRO), Vojin Putniković (SRB)

Gold medal game

7 August 2021; 16:30 v	Report	Spain	5–14	United States	Tokyo Tatsumi International Swimming Center; Referees: Nenad Periš (CRO), Sébastien Dervieux (FRA)
7 August 2021; 16:30 v	Report	Score by quarters: 1–4, 3–3, 0–5, 1–2			Tokyo Tatsumi International Swimming Center; Referees: Nenad Periš (CRO), Sébastien Dervieux (FRA)
7 August 2021; 16:30 v	Report	García 2	Goals	Musselman 3	Tokyo Tatsumi International Swimming Center; Referees: Nenad Periš (CRO), Sébastien Dervieux (FRA)

== Weightlifting ==
Spain entered four weightlifters (three men and one woman) into the Olympic competition. Three-time medalist Lidia Valentín (women's 87 kg) and rookie Marcos Ruiz (men's +109 kg) finished among the top eight entrants in their respective weight categories based on the IWF Absolute World Rankings, with Rio 2016 Olympian David Sánchez and two-time Olympian Andrés Mata dominating the field of weightlifters vying for qualification from Europe in the men's 73 and 81 kg categories, respectively, based on the IWF Absolute Continental Rankings.

Athlete	Event	Snatch		Clean & jerk		Total	Rank
Athlete	Event	Result	Rank	Result	Rank	Total	Rank
David Sánchez	Men's –73 kg	149	9	177	9	323	10
Andrés Mata	Men's –81 kg	158	9	189	8	347	8
Marcos Ruiz	Men's +109 kg	180	5	215	9	395	8
Lidia Valentín	Women's –87 kg	103	9	122	11	225	10
