= Graeme Saunders =

Graeme Saunders may refer to:

- Graeme Saunders (footballer) (born 1938), Australian rules footballer for North Melbourne
- Graeme Saunders (sailor) (born 1990), Canadian Olympic sailor
