= Fredrik Bergström (sailor) =

Swedish sailor (born 1990)

Personal information
- Full name: Carl Fredrik Bergström
- Nationality: Swedish
- Born: 9 July 1990 (age 35) Onsala, Sweden
- Height: 181 cm (5 ft 11 in)
- Weight: 64 kg (141 lb)

Sailing career
- Sport: Sailing
- Club: Royal Swedish Yacht Club
- Class: 470
Medal record
Men's sailing
Representing Sweden
Olympic Games
Silver medal – second place	2020 Tokyo	Men's 470
World Championships
Gold medal – first place	2021 Vilamoura	Men's 470
Silver medal – second place	2017 Thessaloniki	Men's 470
Bronze medal – third place	2019 Enoshima	Men's 470
European Championships
Gold medal – first place	2018 Burgas	Men's 470
Gold medal – first place	2019 Sanremo	Men's 470

Carl Fredrik Bergström (born 9 July 1990) is a Swedish competitive sailor. He competed at the 2016 Summer Olympics in Rio de Janeiro in the men's 470, where he, with partner Anton Dahlberg, finished in 6th place. At the 2020 Summer Olympics, he and Dahlberg won a silver medal in the men's 470.

Bergström was born in Onsala, and represents the Royal Swedish Yacht Club.

== Sailing career ==
=== 470 Olympic silver medal with Dahlberg (2013–2021) ===
Fredrik Bergström, the 2011 470 Junior World Championship champion, joined forces with two-time Olympian Anton Dahlberg for a 2016 Summer Olympics campaign. The two finished second in the 2014 Trofeo Princesa Sofía. At the 2014 ISAF Sailing World Championships in Santander, they finished 15th.

In November 2015, Dahlberg and Bergström were among the first batch of athletes selected by the Swedish Olympic Committee to represent Sweden at the 2016 Summer Olympics in Rio de Janeiro. At the Olympics, with a fourth place possible before the medal race, the Swedish duo finished sixth.

At the 2017 470 World Championships in Thessaloniki, Dahlberg and Bergström were in the lead before the medal race on the last day, ahead of Australian team Mathew Belcher and Will Ryan. Believing they were on the course side of the starting line at the time of the starting signal, they went back to start again and lost the race and the World championship title. In May 2018, they won the 470 European Championships in Burgas. The year after they defended their European Championship title in Sanremo in May.

At the 2021 470 World Championships in Vilamoura in March 2021, the Dahlberg and Bergström team won their first World championship title, ahead of Portuguese silver medallists Diogo Costa and Pedro Costa and Spanish bronze-medallist team Jordi Xammar and Nicolás Rodríguez.

Dahlberg and Bergström represented Sweden in the men's 470 event at the 2020 Olympics. On the first day of the Olympic regatta in Enoshima, the Swedish duo won the first race and finished 15th in the second. In the end of the series, Dahlberg and Bergström had taken the silver medal after securing the second place in the medal race ahead of Spanish duo Xammar and Rodríguez, who took the bronze. The Australian duo Belcher and Ryan claimed the gold medal.
