= Fredrik Bergström =

Fredrik Bergström may refer to:

- Fredrik Bergström (badminton) (born 1975), Swedish badminton player
- Fredrik Bergström (sailor) (born 1990), Swedish sailor
