= Sailing at the 2020 Summer Olympics – Men's 470 =

Men's 470 at the Games of the XXXII Olympiad
- Line drawing of the 470
- Venue: Enoshima Yacht Harbor
- Dates: 28 July – 4 August 2021

Medalists
1st place, gold medalist(s)		Mathew Belcher; Will Ryan	Australia
2nd place, silver medalist(s)		Anton Dahlberg; Fredrik Bergström	Sweden
3rd place, bronze medalist(s)		Jordi Xammar; Nicolás Rodríguez	Spain

The men's 470 was a sailing event at the 2020 Summer Olympics, in the 470 dinghy that took place between 28 July and 4 August 2021 at Enoshima Yacht Harbor. 11 races (the last one a medal race) will be held. 19 teams have qualified for the event.

Medals were presented by IOC Member for Paraguay Camilo Pérez López Moreira and World Sailing Athlete Commission Chair Mrs Duriye Ozlem Akdurak.

== Schedule ==
Wed 28 Jul	Thu 29 Jul	Fri 30 Jul	Sat 31 Jul	Sun 1 Aug	Mon 2 Aug	Tue 3 Aug	Wed 4 Aug
Race 1 Race 2	Race 3 Race 4	Race 5 Race 6	Rest day	Race 7 Race 8	Rest day	Race 9 (Note: Race 9 and 10 were originally planned to take place August 2, but were postponed because of light winds.); Race 10	Medal race

== Results ==
Results of individual races
Pos	Crew	Country	I	II	III	IV	V	VI	VII	VIII	IX	X	MR	Tot	Pts
1st place, gold medalist(s)	Mathew Belcher; Will Ryan	Australia	2	5	1	1	4	3	2	1	2	8^{†}	2	31	23
2nd place, silver medalist(s)	Anton Dahlberg; Fredrik Bergström	Sweden	1	15^{†}	8	5	6	11	1	5	3	1	4	60	45
3rd place, bronze medalist(s)	Jordi Xammar; Nicolás Rodríguez	Spain	10	1	10	6	14^{†}	1	3	2	5	7	10	69	55
4	Paul Snow-Hansen; Daniel Willcox	New Zealand	6	2	7	7	5	7	13^{†}	8	6	3	6	70	57
5	Luke Patience; Chris Grube	Great Britain	3	8	2	4	10^{†}	5	9	6	7	10	16	80	70
6	Giacomo Ferrari; Giulio Calabrò	Italy	9	9	12	9	9	4	14^{†}	3	10	2	14	95	81
7	Keiju Okada; Jumpei Hokazono	Japan	7	4	4	11	13	9	5	4	15^{†}	13	12	97	82
8	Panagiotis Mantis; Pavlos Kagialis	Greece	5	6	3	DSQ 20^{†}	15	12	8	7	4	6	18	104	84
9	Stuart McNay; David Hughes	United States	8	12^{†}	9	10	8	8	7	9	8	11	8	98	86
10	Deniz Çınar; Ateş Çınar	Turkey	11	14	5	3	2	10	17^{†}	13	11	4	20	110	93
11	Kevin Peponnet; Jérémie Mion	France	4	7	11	13	12	2	11	11	13	16^{†}		100	87
12	Pavel Sozykin; Denis Gribanov	ROC	14	13	6	12	16^{†}	6	6	10	9	12		104	90
13	Xu Zangjun; Wang Yang	China	15^{†}	11	13	8	11	14	4	15	14	5		110	95
14	Park Gun-woo; Cho Sung-min	South Korea	17^{†}	16	14	15	3	17	15	14	1	9		121	104
15	Diogo Costa; Pedro Costa	Portugal	13	10	15	14	1	13	10	16	12	17^{†}		121	104
16	Henrique Haddad; Bruno Bethlem	Brazil	16	3	17	2	18	19^{†}	12	17	16	15		137	118
17	Jacob Saunders; Oliver Bone	Canada	12	17^{†}	16	16	7	15	16	12	17	14		142	125
18	Tyler Paige; Adrian Hoesch	American Samoa	18	19^{†}	18	17	17	16	19	18	18	18		178	159
19	Matias Montinho; Paixão Afonso	Angola	DNF 20^{†}	18	19	18	19	18	18	19	19	19		187	167

Scoring system: low-point system;
Legend: – Qualified for medal race(s); DNF – Did not finish; DSQ – Disqualified; † – Discarded race not counted in the overall result;
