= 2021 470 World Championships =

2021 World Championships
- Location: Vilamoura, Portugal
- Dates: 5 to 13 March 2021

The 2021 470 World Championships were held from 5 to 13 March 2021 in Vilamoura, Portugal.

== Medal summary ==
Event	Gold	Silver	Bronze
Men details	Sweden; Anton Dahlberg; Fredrik Bergström	Portugal; Diogo Costa; Pedro Costa	Spain; Jordi Xammar; Nicolás Rodríguez
Women details	Spain; Silvia Mas; Patricia Cantero	Netherlands; Afrodite Zegers; Lobke Berkhout	Italy; Elena Berta; Bianca Caruso
Mixed details	Israel; Gil Cohen; Noam Homri	Israel; Tal Sade; Noa Lasri	Great Britain; Amy Seabright; James Taylor
