= Jumpei Hokazono =

Japanese sailor

Personal information
- Nationality: Japanese
- Born: 20 March 1991 (age 35) Hioki, Japan

Sport
- Sport: Sailing

Jumpei Hokazono (外薗 潤平, Hokazono Junpei, born 20 March 1991) is a Japanese sailor. He competed in the men's 470 event at the 2020 Summer Olympics.
