= Wang Yang (sailor) =

Chinese sailor

Personal information
- Nationality: Chinese
- Born: 9 July 1993 (age 31)

Sport
- Sport: Sailing

Wang Yang (born 9 July 1993) is a Chinese sailor. He competed in the men's 470 event at the 2020 Summer Olympics.
