= Sebastian Östling =

Swedish sailor

Personal information
- Full name: John Sebastian Östling
- Nationality: Swedish
- Born: 2 June 1984 (age 42) Onsala, Kungsbacka, Sweden
- Height: 1.80 m (5 ft 11 in)
- Weight: 71 kg (157 lb)

Sailing career
- Sport: Sailing
- Club: Royal Swedish Yacht Club
- Coached by: Per Frykholm
- Class: 470

John Sebastian Östling (born 2 June 1984 in Onsala, Kungsbacka) is a Swedish sailor, who specializes in the 470 class, a two-person dinghy. He represented Sweden, along with his partner Anton Dahlberg, in two editions of the Olympic Games (2008 and 2012), and has also been training representing Royal Swedish Yacht Club throughout most of his sporting career under his personal coach and mentor Per Frykholm.

== Saling career ==
=== Olympic 470 campaigns with Dahlberg (2007–2012) ===
Sebastian Östling and Anton Dahlberg had gone to the same riksidrottsgymnasium, but started to sail together first when they both were studying at the Stockholm School of Economics. Dahlberg and Östling finished 35th out of 112 in the men's 470 event at the 2007 ISAF Sailing World Championships in Cascais, taking in a bullet in the first race of the opening series.

Östling made his Olympic debut at the 2008 Summer Olympics in Beijing, where he paired up with skipper Dahlberg in the men's 470 class. The Swedish duo finished 15th in a ten-round opening series with a net score of 111, trailing Israelis Gideon Kliger and Udi Gal by a narrow, three-point gap from the final standings.

At the 2012 Summer Olympics in London, Östling competed for the second time as a crew member in the men's 470 class by finishing eleventh and receiving a berth from the ISAF World Championships in Perth, Western Australia. Teaming again with Dahlberg in the opening series, the Swedish duo mounted four top 10 finishes to guarantee a spot in the final race, but fell short for the podium with an accumulated net score of 123 points and a tenth-place finish in a fleet of twenty-seven boats.

=== Olympic 470 campaign with Molund ===
Östling then paired with Johan Molund aiming for the 2016 Summer Olympics. The duo won the 2015 Delta Lloyd Regatta in Medemblik.

== Results ==
As of 27 September 2015

Year	Competition	Venue	Position	Event
1997	Optimist World Championships	Carrickfergus, UK	68th	Optimist class
1999	Optimist World Championships	Martinique, France	39th	Optimist class
2007	ISAF Sailing World Championships	Cascais, Portugal	35th	470 class
2008	470 World Championships	Melbourne, Australia	51st	470 class
2008	Olympic Games	Qingdao, China	15th	470 class
2009	470 World Championships	Rungsted, Denmark	24th	470 class
2010	470 World Championships	The Hague, the Netherlands	14th	470 class
2011	ISAF Sailing World Championships	Perth, Australia	11th	470 class
2012	Olympic Games	Weymouth and Portland, UK	10th	470 class
2013	49er World Championships	Marseille, France	73rd	49er class
