= Graeme Saunders (footballer) =

Australian rules footballer

Personal information
- Full name: Graeme Saunders
- Born: 26 July 1938 (age 88)
- Original team: Sunshine
- Height: 179 cm (5 ft 10 in)
- Weight: 78 kg (172 lb)

Playing career^{1}
Years	Club	Games (Goals)
1961–62	North Melbourne	10 (0)
- ^{1} Playing statistics correct to the end of 1962.

Graeme Saunders (born 26 July 1938) is a former Australian rules footballer who played with North Melbourne in the Victorian Football League (VFL).
