= Graeme Saunders (sailor) =

Canadian sailor

Personal information
- Born: July 19, 1990 (age 36) Halifax, Nova Scotia, Canada
- Home town: Chester, Nova Scotia, Canada
- Height: 178 cm (5 ft 10 in)

Sailing career
- Sport: Sailing
- Club: Chester Yacht Club
- Class: 470

Achievements and titles
- Olympic finals: 2016 Summer Olympics

Graeme Saunders (born July 19, 1990) is a Canadian sailor. Along with his partner (and brother) Jacob Saunders, he competed at the 2016 Summer Olympics, finishing in 22nd place in the men's 470 event. He started his early training at the Chester Yacht Club and has also competed as Graeme Chaplin-Saunders.

== Early life and education ==
Saunders first enrolled in the junior sailing program at Chester Yacht Club in his hometown of Chester, Nova Scotia, in 2002. Competing in the 420 class, he won provincial and Atlantic Canadian events.

Graeme started sailing with his younger brother, Jacob, in 2009; they started competing together in the two-person 470 class in 2011. Graeme worked crew, while Jacob took the helm as skipper. The Saunders brothers received Sail Canada's Nathan Cowan Memorial Award for Developing Sailors in 2012, and received the Marvin McDill Memorial Award for the Canadian Sailing Team's Rookie of the Year in 2013. In 2014, Graeme Saunders completed a degree in Commerce at Dalhousie University.

== Career ==
In January 2016, Graeme and Jacob placed second in the 470 medal race at the Sailing World Cup in Miami, finishing 7th overall. Their performance secured a place for Canada in the men's 470 event at the 2016 Summer Olympics, but the brothers had to continue competing for their individual spots on Team Canada. At the world championships a few weeks later, they finished in 32nd place, their best performance, for the second year in a row.

On June 3, 2016, Graeme and Jacob Saunders were named to Canada's Olympic Sailing team. Before the Olympics, they took part in the Sail for Gold regatta in Weymouth. At the 2016 Olympics in Rio de Janeiro, they placed 22nd in the men's 470 event.
