= Patricia Cantero =

Spanish sailor

Personal information
- Full name: Patricia Cantero Reina
- Born: 22 August 1989 (age 36)
- Spouse: Tom Etheridge (27 July 2024)

Sport
- Country: Spain
- Sport: Sailing
Medal record
Women's sailing
Representing Spain
World Championships
Gold medal – first place	2021 Vilamoura	470

Patricia Cantero Reina (born 22 August 1989) is a Spanish competitive sailor.

She competed at the 2021 470 World Championships in Vilamoura, winning a gold medal in the women's 470 class, along with Silvia Mas Depares.
