= Silvia Mas =

Spanish sailor (born 1996)

Personal information
- Full name: Silvia Mas Depares
- Born: 23 August 1996 (age 29) Barcelona
- Height: 160 cm (5 ft 3 in)
- Weight: 55 kg (121 lb)

Sport
- Country: Spain
- Sport: Sailing
Medal record
Women's sailing
Representing Spain
World Championships
Gold medal – first place	2021 Vilamoura	470

Silvia Mas Depares (born 23 August 1996) is a Spanish competitive sailor.

== Life ==
She was born in Barcelona and she competed at the 2021 470 World Championships in Vilamoura, winning a gold medal in the women's 470 class, along with Patricia Cantero Reina.

After the 2024 Olympics, she is then committed to join a team for the (first) women's Americas Cup in 2024. The team consists of Mas, Támara Echegoyen, María Cantero, Neus Ballester and Paula Barceló.
