= Oliver Bone =

Canadian sailor

Personal information
- Full name: Oliver Bone
- Nationality: Canada
- Born: April 29, 1981 (age 45) Montreal, Quebec, Canada
- Height: 1.80 m (5 ft 11 in)
- Weight: 69 kg (152 lb)

Sailing career
- Sport: Sailing
- Club: Royal Nova Scotia Yacht Squadron
- Class: Dinghy

Oliver Bone (born April 29, 1981) is a Canadian sailor, who specialized in two-person dinghy (470) class. He represented Canada, along with his partner Stéphane Locas, at the 2008 Summer Olympics, finishing last from a fleet of twenty-nine entries. Currently, Bone trains for the Royal Nova Scotia Yacht Squadron in Halifax, Nova Scotia.

Bone qualified as a crew member for the Canadian squad in the men's 470 class at the 2008 Summer Olympics in Beijing, by placing twenty-ninth and receiving a berth from the World Championships in Melbourne, Australia. Teaming with skipper Stéphane Locas in the eleven-race series, the Canadian duo struggled to catch up with the rest of the boats for most of the legs that sat them at the far bottom of the leaderboard with 205 net points.

He represented Canada at the 2020 Summer Olympics.
