= Royal Nova Scotia Yacht Squadron =

Canadian yacht club in Halifax

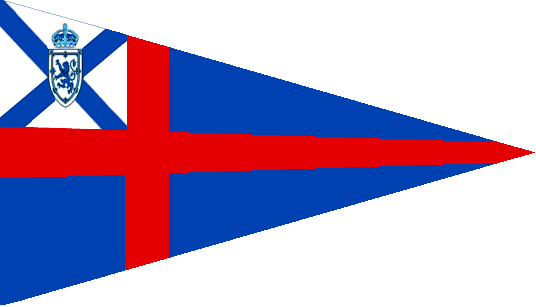
- Burgee of Royal Nova Scotia Yacht Squadron
- Abbreviation: RNSYS
- Formation: 1837
- Headquarters: Halifax, Nova Scotia, Canada
- Location: 44°37′16.1″N 63°34′55″W
- Website: www.rnsys.com

The Royal Nova Scotia Yacht Squadron (RNSYS) is a yacht club, the oldest in the Americas, and is located on the Northwest Arm of Halifax Harbour in Halifax, Nova Scotia.

== History ==
Originally established as the Halifax Yacht Club in 1837, the club was granted permission by Queen Victoria to use "Royal" in its name in 1861. That year, the Prince of Wales presented the club with its most prestigious trophy, the Prince of Wales Cup. In 1862, it received its first Admiralty warrant, allowing its yachts to display the blue ensign for privileges including exemption from harbour dues.

On November 25, 1875, a group of yacht-owning members broke off and formed the Nova Scotia Yacht Squadron, following a dispute over racing rules. In November 1880, the Admiralty finally acknowledged that nearly all the yachts from the Royal Halifax Yacht Club had moved over to the Nova Scotia Yacht Squadron, and granted the Squadron's request for a warrant. The club was re-named the Royal Nova Scotia Yacht Squadron in 1880.

== Organization ==
The Royal Nova Scotia Yacht Squadron has been incorporated as a not-for-profit society in Nova Scotia, Canada, and has legal status to operate in Nova Scotia.

The Yacht Squadron is home to the RNSYS race teams coached by head coach Agustin Ferrario, as well as 2012 Olympian Danielle Dube, and 2004 and 2008 Olympian Lisa Ross, the Squadron has sent at least one youth sailor to every ISAF Youth Worlds since 2010. In 2013, the RNSYS sent 5 Youth sailors to Youth Worlds.

RNSYS has, since 1905, partnered with the Boston Yacht Club of Marblehead, Massachusetts in organizing the Marblehead to Halifax Ocean Race held biennially in odd-numbered years. It is believed to be the world’s longest-running offshore ocean race. The Squadron hosted the International Federation of Disabled Sailing (IFDS) World Championships in 2014, and has become a centre of excellence for disabled sailing.

== See also ==
- List of Canadian organizations with royal patronage
- Armdale Yacht Club
- Dartmouth Yacht Club
