= Nicolás Rodríguez (sailor) =

Spanish sailor

Personal information
- Full name: Nicolás Rodríguez García-Paz
- Born: 30 April 1991 (age 35) Vigo, Spain
- Height: 179 cm (5 ft 10 in)
- Weight: 71 kg (157 lb)

Sailing career
- Sport: Sailing
- Classes: 470; 420; 49er
Medal record
Men's sailing
Representing Spain
Olympic Games
Bronze medal – third place	2020 Tokyo	470

Nicolás Rodríguez García-Paz (born 30 April 1991) is a Spanish sailor. Rodríguez and Jordi Xammar won a bronze medal for Spain at the 2020 Summer Olympics in the men's 470 event.
