= Pedro Costa (sailor) =

Portuguese sailor

Personal information
- Full name: Pedro Eurico Vaz de Bacelar da Fonseca e Costa
- Nationality: Portugal
- Born: 11 May 1996 (age 29) Porto
- Height: 1.73 m (5 ft 8 in)
- Parents: Fernando Luís Lopes da Fonseca e Costa (father); Maria Cecília de Sousa Carneiro Vaz de Bacelar (mother)

Sport
- Sport: Sailing

Pedro Costa (born 11 May 1996) is a Portuguese sailor. He competed in the 2020 Summer Olympics.

Costa placed second in the 2021 470 World Championships with Diogo Costa, qualifying the pair for the 2020 Olympics.
