= Spain at the 2024 Summer Olympics =

- IOC code: ESP
- NOC: Spanish Olympic Committee
- Website: www.coe.es (in Spanish)

in Paris, France 26 July 2024 – 11 August 2024
- Competitors: 383 (190 men and 193 women) in 31 sports
- Flag bearers (opening): Marcus Cooper Walz & Támara Echegoyen
- Flag bearers (closing): Jordan Díaz & María Pérez
- Medals Ranked 15th: Gold 5 Silver 4 Bronze 9 Total 18

Summer Olympics appearances (overview)
- 1900; 1904–1912; 1920; 1924; 1928; 1932; 1936; 1948; 1952; 1956; 1960; 1964; 1968; 1972; 1976; 1980; 1984; 1988; 1992; 1996; 2000; 2004; 2008; 2012; 2016; 2020; 2024; 2028

Spain competed at the 2024 Summer Olympics in Paris from 26 July to 11 August 2024. Spanish athletes have appeared in every edition of the Summer Olympic Games from 1920 onwards, except for the 1936 Summer Olympics in Nazi Germany because the nation's government was part of the anti-fascist boycott.

Spanish athletes competed in all sports except breaking, rugby sevens, weightlifting and wrestling.

== Medalists ==
Medal	Name	Sport	Event	Date
Gold	Diego Botín; Florián Trittel	Sailing	Men's 49er	2 August
Gold	Álvaro Martín; María Pérez	Athletics	Mixed marathon walk relay	7 August
Gold	Spain national under-23 football team: Álex Baena; Pablo Barrios; Adrián Bernabé; Sergio Camello; Pau Cubarsí; Eric García; Joan García; Sergio Gómez; Miguel Gutiérrez; Alejandro Iturbe; Diego López; Fermín López; Juan Miranda; Cristhian Mosquera; Samu Omorodion; Aimar Oroz; Jon Pacheco; Marc Pubill; Abel Ruiz; Juanlu Sánchez; Arnau Tenas; Beñat Turrientes	Football	Men's tournament	9 August
Gold	Jordan Díaz	Athletics	Men's triple jump	9 August
Gold	Spain women's national water polo team: Paula Camus; Paula Crespí; Anni Espar; Laura Ester; Judith Forca; Maica García; Paula Leitón; Beatriz Ortiz; Pili Peña; Nona Pérez; Isabel Piralkova; Elena Ruiz; Martina Terré	Water polo	Women's tournament	10 August
Silver	María Pérez	Athletics	Women's 20 km walk	1 August
Silver	Carlos Alcaraz	Tennis	Men's singles	4 August
Silver	Spain women's national 3x3 team: Gracia Alonso de Armiño; Juana Camilión; Vega Gimeno; Sandra Ygueravide	Basketball	Women's 3×3 tournament	5 August
Silver	Ayoub Ghadfa	Boxing	Men's super heavyweight	10 August
Bronze	Francisco Garrigós	Judo	Men's −60 kg	27 July
Bronze	Álvaro Martín	Athletics	Men's 20 km walk	1 August
Bronze	Pau Echaniz	Canoeing	Men's slalom K-1	1 August
Bronze	Cristina Bucșa; Sara Sorribes	Tennis	Women's doubles	4 August
Bronze	Enmanuel Reyes	Boxing	Men's heavyweight	4 August
Bronze	Meritxell Ferré Marina García Polo Lilou Lluis Meritxell Mas; Alisa Ozhogina Paula Ramírez Iris Tió Blanca Toledano	Artistic swimming	Team event	7 August
Bronze	Diego Domínguez; Joan Antoni Moreno	Canoeing	Men's C-2 500 m	8 August
Bronze	Carlos Arévalo; Saúl Craviotto; Rodrigo Germade; Marcus Walz	Canoeing	Men's K-4 500 m	8 August
Bronze	Spain men's national handball team: Agustín Casado; Rodrigo Corrales; Alex Dujshebaev; Daniel Dujshebaev; Daniel Fernández; Adrià Figueras; Imanol Garciandia; Aleix Gómez; Jorge Maqueda; Kauldi Odriozola; Gonzalo Pérez de Vargas; Javier Rodríguez; Miguel Sánchez-Migallón; Abel Serdio; Ian Tarrafeta	Handball	Men's tournament	11 August

Medals by sport
Sport	1st place, gold medalist(s)	2nd place, silver medalist(s)	3rd place, bronze medalist(s)	Total
Athletics	2	1	1	4
Football	1	0	0	1
Sailing	1	0	0	1
Water polo	1	0	0	1
Boxing	0	1	1	2
Tennis	0	1	1	2
Basketball	0	1	0	1
Canoeing	0	0	3	3
Artistic swimming	0	0	1	1
Handball	0	0	1	1
Judo	0	0	1	1
Total	5	4	9	18

Medals by gender
Gender	1st place, gold medalist(s)	2nd place, silver medalist(s)	3rd place, bronze medalist(s)	Total
Male	3	2	7	12
Female	1	2	2	5
Mixed	1	0	0	1
Total	5	4	9	18

Medals by date
Date	1st place, gold medalist(s)	2nd place, silver medalist(s)	3rd place, bronze medalist(s)	Total
27 July	0	0	1	1
1 August	0	1	2	3
2 August	1	0	0	1
4 August	0	1	2	3
5 August	0	1	0	1
7 August	1	0	1	2
8 August	0	0	2	2
9 August	2	0	0	2
10 August	1	1	0	2
11 August	0	0	1	1
Total	5	4	9	18

Multiple medalists
Name	Sport	1st place, gold medalist(s)	2nd place, silver medalist(s)	3rd place, bronze medalist(s)	Total
María Pérez	Athletics	1	1	0	2
Álvaro Martín	Athletics	1	0	1	2

== Competitors ==
The following is the provisional list of number of competitors in the Games. Note that alternate athletes (AP) are not counted:

Sport	Men	Women	Total
Archery	1	1	2
Artistic swimming	0	8	8
Athletics	26	32	58
Badminton	1	1	2
Basketball	12	16	28
Boxing	5	1	6
Canoeing	12	9	21
Cycling	7	2	9
Diving	2	2	4
Equestrian	8	0	8
Fencing	1	1	2
Field hockey	16	16	32
Football	18	18	36
Golf	2	2	4
Gymnastics	6	11	17
Handball	14	14	28
Judo	5	4	9
Modern pentathlon	0	1	1
Rowing	6	3	9
Sailing	6	7	13
Shooting	2	2	4
Skateboarding	2	4	6
Sport climbing	1	1	2
Surfing	1	2	3
Swimming	9	11	20
Table tennis	1	1	2
Taekwondo	2	2	4
Tennis	6	2	8
Triathlon	3	2	5
Volleyball	2	4	6
Water polo	13	13	26
Total	190	193	383

Additional 23 alternate athletes (AP) were entered in artistic swimming, athletics, equestrian, field hockey, football and handball.

== Archery ==
Two Spanish archers qualified for the mixed team recurve, along with the men's and women's individual recurve, by winning the gold medal at the 2023 European Games in Kraków, Poland.

Athlete	Event	Ranking round		Round of 64	Round of 32	Round of 16	Quarterfinals	Semifinals	Final / BM	
Athlete	Event	Score	Seed	Opposition Score	Opposition Score	Opposition Score	Opposition Score	Opposition Score	Opposition Score	Rank
Pablo Acha	Men's individual	662	33	Lin Z-s (TPE); L 2–6	Did not advance					
Elia Canales	Women's individual	662	16	Havers (GBR); L 0–6	Did not advance					
Pablo Acha; Elia Canales	Mixed team	1324	13 Q	—N/a		China; W 6–2	India; L 3–5	Did not advance		

== Artistic swimming ==
Spain fielded a squad of eight artistic swimmers to compete across all events by securing one of five available spots in the women's team routine at the 2024 World Aquatics Championships in Doha, Qatar.

Athlete	Event	Technical routine		Free routine		Acrobatic routine		Total	Rank
Athlete	Event	Points	Rank	Points	Rank	Points	Rank	Total	Rank
Alisa Ozhogina; Iris Tió	Duet	254.0816	7	267.4021	8	—N/a		521.4837	7
Meritxell Ferré; Marina García Polo; Lilou Lluís Valette; Meritxell Mas; Alisa Ozhogina; Paula Ramírez; Iris Tió; Blanca Toledano	Team	287.1475	2	346.4644	4	267.1200	4	900.7319	3rd place, bronze medalist(s)

== Athletics ==
Spanish track and field athletes achieved the entry standards for Paris 2024, either by passing the direct qualifying mark (or time for track and road races) or by world ranking, in the events listed below (a maximum of 3 athletes each). Additionally, Spain qualified two teams for the mixed marathon walk relay through their corresponding top ten finish at the 2024 World Athletics Race Walking Team Championships in Antalya, Turkey, as well as two relay teams through the 2024 World Athletics Relays held in Nassau, Bahamas; with a third relay team later qualifying through the World Athletics Top List. The marathon squad was first announced on 19 March 2024 and the race walk team was later presented on 14 June 2024; on 8 July 2024 the full final squad was announced. The following selected relay only athletes did not get to compete at the Games: Manuel Guijarro, (men's 4 × 400 m), Paula García, Esther Navero (women's 4 × 100 m), Bárbara Camblor (women's 4 × 400 m), Alberto Amezcua, Antía Chamosa and Raquel González (mixed race walk).

Key

- Note–Ranks given for track events are within the athlete's heat only
- Q = Qualified for the next round
- q = Qualified for the next round as a fastest loser or, in field events, by position without achieving the qualifying target
- R = Qualified for the Repechage
- NR = National record
- PB = Personal best
- SB = Season best
- N/A = Round not applicable for the event
- Bye = Athlete not required to compete in round

Track & road events
Men

Athlete	Event	Heat		Repechage		Semifinal		Final	
Athlete	Event	Result	Rank	Result	Rank	Result	Rank	Result	Rank
Mohamed Attaoui	800 m	1:44.81	1 Q	Bye		1:43.69	4 q	1:42.08	5
Adrián Ben	800 m	1:45.03	4 R	1:45.37	2	Did not advance			
Josué Canales	800 m	1:46.48	5 R	1:44.65	4	Did not advance			
Ignacio Fontes	1500 m	3:37.50	7 R	3:35.04	8	Did not advance			
Mario García Romo	1500 m	3:37.90	10 R	3:37.01	11	Did not advance			
Adel Mechaal	1500 m	3:35.81	9 R	3:42.79	14	Did not advance			
Adel Mechaal	5000 m	DNS		—N/a				Did not advance	
Thierry Ndikumwenayo	5000 m	DNF qR		—N/a				13:24.07	15
Thierry Ndikumwenayo	10000 m	—N/a						26:49.49 NR	9
Abdessamad Oukhelfen	10000 m	—N/a						28:21.90	23
Enrique Llopis	110 m hurdles	13.28	2 Q	Bye		13.17	2 Q	13.20	4
Asier Martínez	110 m hurdles	13.47	4 R	13.46	2 Q	13.35	5	Did not advance	
Daniel Arce	3000 m steeplechase	8:18.31	4 Q	—N/a				8:13.80	10
Julio Arenas; Iñaki Cañal; David García Zurita; Óscar Husillos	4 × 400 m relay	3:01.60	6	—N/a				Did not advance	
Ibrahim Chakir	Marathon	—N/a						2:11:44	34
Tariku Novales	Marathon	—N/a						2:25:50 SB	68
Yago Rojo	Marathon	—N/a						2:12:43 SB	41
Diego García	20 km walk	—N/a						1:23:10	33
Álvaro Martín	20 km walk	—N/a						1:19:11	3rd place, bronze medalist(s)
Paul McGrath	20 km walk	—N/a						1:20:32	17

Women

Athlete	Event	Heat		Repechage		Semifinal		Final	
Athlete	Event	Result	Rank	Result	Rank	Result	Rank	Result	Rank
Jaël Bestué	200 m	23.17	4 R	23.22	2	Did not advance			
Lorea Ibarzábal	800 m	2:00.71	6 R	1:59.81	3	Did not advance			
Lorena Martín	800 m	2:02.52	7 R	2:03.04	7	Did not advance			
Esther Guerrero	1500 m	4:06.60	10 R	4:03.15	3 Q	4:01.94	7	Did not advance	
Águeda Marqués	1500 m	4:01.60 PB	9 R	4:07.05	3 Q	4:01.90	6 Q	4:00.31 PB	11
Marta Pérez	1500 m	4:04.94	6 Q	Bye		3:57.75 NR	8	Did not advance	
Marta García Alonso	5000 m	15:08.87	10	—N/a				Did not advance	
Carolina Robles	3000 m steeplechase	9:22.48	7	—N/a				Did not advance	
Irene Sánchez-Escribano	3000 m steeplechase	9:17.39 PB	5 Q	—N/a				9:10.43 PB	11
Jaël Bestué; Sonia Molina-Prados; María Isabel Pérez; Paula Sevilla	4 × 100 m relay	42.77 SB	7	—N/a				Did not advance	
Carmen Avilés; Blanca Hervás; Eva Santidrián; Berta Segura	4 × 400 m relay	3:28.29	5	—N/a				Did not advance	
Majida Maayouf	Marathon	—N/a						2:28.35 SB	17
Ester Navarrete	Marathon	—N/a						2:32:07	42
Meritxell Soler	Marathon	—N/a						2:29:56	25
Laura García-Caro	20 km walk	—N/a						1:28:12	7
Cristina Montesinos	20 km walk	—N/a						1:29:11	10
María Pérez	20 km walk	—N/a						1:26:19 SB	2nd place, silver medalist(s)

Mixed

Athlete	Event	Final	
Athlete	Event	Result	Rank
Miguel Ángel López; Cristina Montesinos	Marathon walk relay	2:56.10	9
Álvaro Martín; María Pérez	Marathon walk relay	2:50:31	1st place, gold medalist(s)

Field events
Men

Athlete	Event	Heat		Final	
Athlete	Event	Result	Rank	Result	Rank
Jordan Díaz	Triple jump	17.24	2 Q	17.86	1st place, gold medalist(s)

Women

Athlete	Event	Heat		Final	
Athlete	Event	Result	Rank	Result	Rank
Fátima Diame	Long jump	6.52	15	Did not advance	
Tessy Ebosele	Long jump	6.09	30	Did not advance	
Ana Peleteiro	Triple jump	14.36	5 Q	14.59	6
María Belén Toimil	Shot put	16.83	25	Did not advance	
Yulenmis Aguilar	Javelin throw	61.95	9 q	62.78	6

Combined events – Men's decathlon

Athlete	Event	100 m	LJ	SP	HJ	400 m	110H	DT	PV	JT	1500 m	Final	Rank
Jorge Ureña	Result	10.87	7.05	13.77	1.96	48.08 (SB)	14.29	40.92	NM	57.93	4:42.18	7096	20
Jorge Ureña	Points	890	826	714	767	905	937	683	0	707	667	7096	20

== Badminton ==
Spain entered two badminton players (one per gender) into the Olympic tournament. Rio 2016 Olympic champion Carolina Marín, with Pablo Abián playing in the badminton court at his fifth consecutive Games on the men's side, were automatically selected among the top 40 individual shuttlers in their respective singles events, based on the BWF World "Race to Paris" Rankings, which were closed on 28 April 2024.

Athlete	Event	Group stage			Elimination	Quarter-final	Semi-final	Final / BM	
Athlete	Event	Opposition Score	Opposition Score	Rank	Opposition Score	Opposition Score	Opposition Score	Opposition Score	Rank
Pablo Abián	Men's singles	Nettasinghe (SRI); W 21–9, 21–19	Lee Z J (MAS); L 10–21, 13–21	2	Did not advance				
Carolina Marín	Women's singles	Stadelmann (SUI); W 21–11, 21–19	Darragh (IRL); W 21–5, 21–5	1 Q	Zhang (USA); W 12–21, 21–9, 21–18	Ohori (JPN); W 21–13, 21–14	He (CHN); L 21–14, 10–8 ret	Tunjung (INA); L WO	4

== Basketball ==
=== 5x5 basketball ===
Summary

Team	Event	Group stage				Quarterfinal	Semifinal	Final / BM	
Team	Event	Opposition Score	Opposition Score	Opposition Score	Rank	Opposition Score	Opposition Score	Opposition Score	Rank
Spain men's	Men's tournament	Australia; L 80–92	Greece; W 84–77	Canada; L 85–88	4	Did not advance			10
Spain women's	Women's tournament	China; W 90–89	Puerto Rico; W 63–62	Serbia; W 70–62	1 Q	Belgium; L 66–79	Did not advance		5

==== Men's tournament ====
Spanish men's basketball team qualified for the games by winning the 2024 FIBA Men's Olympic Qualifying Tournament in Valencia, Spain.

Team roster The roster was announced on 9 July 2024.

Spain Men's National Basketball Team – 2024 Summer Olympics roster
Players
Coaches

Pos.	No.	Name	Age – Date of birth	Height	Club	Ctr.
PG	2	Lorenzo Brown	33 – 26 August 1990	1.96 m (6 ft 5 in)	Panathinaikos	(Greece)
PF	4	Jaime Pradilla	23 – 3 January 2001	2.05 m (6 ft 9 in)	Valencia	(Spain)
SF	5	Rudy Fernández (C)	39 – 4 April 1985	1.96 m (6 ft 5 in)	Real Madrid	(Spain)
SF	6	Xabier López-Arostegui	27 – 19 May 1997	2.01 m (6 ft 7 in)	Valencia	(Spain)
PF	7	Santi Aldama	23 – 10 January 2001	2.11 m (6 ft 11 in)	Memphis Grizzlies	(United States)
SG	8	Darío Brizuela	29 – 8 November 1994	1.85 m (6 ft 1 in)	Barcelona	(Spain)
PG	9	Alberto Díaz	30 – 23 April 1994	1.90 m (6 ft 3 in)	Unicaja	(Spain)
PF	10	Juancho Hernangómez	28 – 28 September 1995	2.06 m (6 ft 9 in)	Panathinaikos	(Greece)
C	14	Willy Hernangómez	30 – 27 May 1994	2.11 m (6 ft 11 in)	Barcelona	(Spain)
C	16	Usman Garuba	22 – 9 March 2002	2.03 m (6 ft 8 in)	Golden State Warriors	(United States)
SG	21	Álex Abrines	30 – 1 August 1993	1.98 m (6 ft 6 in)	Barcelona	(Spain)
SG	23	Sergio Llull	36 – 15 November 1987	1.90 m (6 ft 3 in)	Real Madrid	(Spain)

Head coach

- (Italy) Sergio Scariolo

Assistant coach(es)

- (Spain) Luis Guil
- (Spain) Angel Sanchez-Cañete

Legend

- (C) Team captain
- Club – describes last
  club before the competition
- Age – describes age
  on 27 July 2024

Group play

Pos	Team	Pld	W	L	PF	PA	PD	Pts	Qualification
1	Canada	3	3	0	267	247	+20	6	Quarterfinals
2	Australia	3	1	2	246	250	−4	4 (Note: Australia 3 Pts, +6 PD; Greece 3 Pts, −1 PD; Spain 3 Pts, −5 PD.)	Quarterfinals
3	Greece	3	1	2	233	241	−8	4	Quarterfinals
4	Spain	3	1	2	249	257	−8	4	

Source: FIBA
Rules for classification: 1) classification points; 2) head-to-head results; 3) head-to-head game points difference; 4) head-to-head number of game points scored.
Notes:

27 July 2024
11:00

Report

Australia	92–80	Spain
Scoring by quarter: 31–21, 18–21, 20–18, 23–20
Pts: Landale 20; Rebs: Landale 9 Asts: Giddey 8		Pts: Aldama 27; Rebs: Garuba 7 Asts: Brown 7

Stade Pierre-Mauroy, Lille
Attendance: 26,991
Referees: Gatis Saliņš (LAT), Omar Bermúdez (MEX), Juan Fernández (ARG)

30 July 2024
11:00

Report

Spain	84–77	Greece
Scoring by quarter: 21–22, 28–13, 13–21, 22–21
Pts: Aldama 19; Rebs: Aldama 12; Asts: Brown 10		Pts: Antetokounmpo 27; Rebs: Antetokounmpo 11; Asts: Calathes 7

Stade Pierre-Mauroy, Lille
Attendance: 26,980
Referees: Ademir Zurapović (BIH), Mārtiņš Kozlovskis (LAT), Julio Anaya (PAN)

2 August 2024
17:15

Report

Canada	88–85	Spain
Scoring by quarter: 19–19, 30–19, 15–18, 24–29
Pts: Gilgeous-Alexander 20; Rebs: Brooks, Murray 4 Asts: Murray 6		Pts: Brizuela 17; Rebs: Aldama 11; Asts: three players 4

Stade Pierre-Mauroy, Lille
Attendance: 26,133
Referees: Ademir Zurapović (BIH), Julio Anaya (PAN), Gatis Saliņš (LAT)

==== Women's tournament ====
Spanish women's basketball team qualified for the Olympics as one of three highest-ranked eligible squads at the Tournament 4 groups, at the 2024 Olympic Qualifying Tournaments in Sopron, Hungary.

Team roster

A 15-player roster was announced on 7 June 2024. The final roster was revealed on 9 July 2024.

Spain women's national basketball team – 2024 Summer Olympics roster
Players
Coaches

Pos.	No.	Name	Age – Date of birth	Height	Club	Ctr.
PG	4	Mariona Ortiz	32 – 28 February 1992	1.82 m (6 ft 0 in)	Basket Zaragoza	(Spain)
PF	6	Laura Gil	32 – 24 April 1992	1.90 m (6 ft 3 in)	CB Avenida	(Spain)
SF	7	Alba Torrens	34 – 30 August 1989	1.92 m (6 ft 4 in)	Valencia Basket	(Spain)
PF	8	María Araújo	26 – 1 August 1997	1.82 m (6 ft 0 in)	Çukurova Basketbol	(Turkey)
SF	9	Queralt Casas	31 – 18 November 1992	1.80 m (5 ft 11 in)	Valencia Basket	(Spain)
PG	10	Leticia Romero	29 – 28 May 1995	1.72 m (5 ft 8 in)	Valencia Basket	(Spain)
SG	11	Leonor Rodríguez	32 – 21 October 1991	1.80 m (5 ft 11 in)	CB Avenida	(Spain)
PG	12	Maite Cazorla	27 – 18 June 1997	1.78 m (5 ft 10 in)	USK Praha	(Czech Republic)
F	13	Andrea Vilaró	31 – 9 May 1993	1.79 m (5 ft 10 in)	CB Avenida	(Spain)
C	17	Megan Gustafson	27 – 13 December 1996	1.90 m (6 ft 3 in)	Las Vegas Aces	(United States)
C	20	Paula Ginzo	26 – 16 February 1998	1.89 m (6 ft 2 in)	CB Jairis	(Spain)
SF	22	María Conde	27 – 14 January 1997	1.86 m (6 ft 1 in)	USK Praha	(Czech Republic)

Head coach

- (Spain) Miguel Méndez

Assistant coach(es)

- (Spain) Luis Rey

Legend

- (C) Team captain
- (C) Team captain
- Club – describes last
  club before the tournament
- Age – describes age
  on 28 July 2024

Group play

Pos	Team	Pld	W	L	PF	PA	PD	Pts	Qualification
1	Spain	3	3	0	223	213	+10	6	Quarterfinals
2	Serbia	3	2	1	201	184	+17	5	Quarterfinals
3	China	3	1	2	228	229	−1	4	
4	Puerto Rico	3	0	3	175	201	−26	3	

Source: FIBA
Rules for classification: 1) classification points; 2) head-to-head results; 3) head-to-head game points difference; 4) head-to-head number of game points scored.

28 July 2024
13:30

Report

Spain	90–89 (OT)	China
Scoring by quarter: 13–22, 20–15, 20–22, 23–17, Overtime: 14–13
Pts: Gustafson 29; Rebs: Gustafson 8 Asts: Casas 8		Pts: Li Y. 31; Rebs: Li Y. 15; Asts: Li M. 11

Stade Pierre-Mauroy, Lille
Attendance: 27,021
Referees: Viola Györgyi (NOR), Maripier Malo (CAN), Péter Praksch (HUN)

31 July 2024
11:00

Report

Puerto Rico	62–63	Spain
Scoring by quarter: 9–18, 16–21, 19–5, 18–19
Pts: Guirantes 15; Rebs: Hollingshed 12; Asts: Guirantes 4		Pts: Gustafson 18; Rebs: Gustafson 13; Asts: Ortiz

Stade Pierre-Mauroy, Lille
Attendance: 23,942
Referees: Andrés Bartel (URU), Maripier Malo (CAN), Yevgeniy Mikheyev (KAZ)

3 August 2024
13:30

Report

Serbia	62–70	Spain
Scoring by quarter: 13–16, 15–21, 10–18, 24–15
Pts: Anderson 18; Rebs: Stanković 5 Asts: Anderson 7		Pts: Conde 15; Rebs: Gustafson 9 Asts: Gil 7

Stade Pierre-Mauroy, Lille
Attendance: 26,595
Referees: Takaki Kato (JPN), Viola Györgyi (NOR), Yann Davidson (MAD)

Quarterfinal

7 August 2024
14:30

Report

Spain	66–79	Belgium
Scoring by quarter: 26–26, 11–22, 12–19, 17–12
Pts: Gustafson 21; Rebs: Gustafson 7 Asts: Gil, Ortiz 3		Pts: Linskens, Meesseman 19; Rebs: Meesseman 9 Asts: Delaere, Vanloo 7

Accor Arena, Paris
Attendance: 11,852
Referees: Matthew Kallio (CAN), Jenna Reneau (USA), Maripier Malo (CAN)

=== 3×3 basketball ===
Summary

Team	Event	Group stage								Quarterfinal	Semifinal	Final / BM	
Team	Event	Opposition Score	Opposition Score	Opposition Score	Opposition Score	Opposition Score	Opposition Score	Opposition Score	Rank	Opposition Score	Opposition Score	Opposition Score	Rank
Spain women's	Women's tournament	Azerbaijan; W 18–16	France; W 17–12	China; L 11–14	United States; L 11–17	Australia; W 21–17	Canada; W 22–20	Germany; L 15–18	2 Q	Bye	United States; W 18–16	Germany; L 16–17	2nd place, silver medalist(s)

==== Women's tournament ====
The Spanish women's 3x3 team qualified for the Olympics by finishing in the top three at the 2024 Olympic Qualifying Tournament held in Debrecen, Hungary.

Team roster

The roster was revealed on 7 July 2024.

- Gracia Alonso de Armiño
- Juana Camilión
- Vega Gimeno
- Sandra Ygueravide

Group play

Pos	Team	Pld	W	L	PF	PA	PD	Qualification
1	Germany	7	6	1	117	100	+17	Semifinals
2	Spain	7	4 (Note: Spain 2–1; United States 2–1; Canada 1–2; Australia 1–2. Sorted by points scored after first tie broken.)	3	115	114	+1	Semifinals
3	United States	7	4	3	108	109	−1	Play-ins
4	Canada	7	4	3	129	112	+17	Play-ins
5	Australia	7	4	3	127	122	+5	Play-ins
6	China	7	2 (Note: China 1–1; France 1–1; Azerbaijan 1–1. Sorted by points scored.)	5	107	123	−16	Play-ins
7	Azerbaijan	7	2	5	106	123	−17	
8	France (H)	7	2	5	99	105	−6	

Source: FIBA
Rules for classification: 1) Wins; 2) Head-to-head record; 3) Points scored.
(H) Hosts
Notes:

30 July 2024
21:00

Boxscore

Spain	18–16	Azerbaijan
Pts: Gimeno, Alonso de Armiño 5		Pts: Hayes 10

Place de la Concorde, Paris
Referees: Edmond Ho (HKG), Dorothy Okatch (BOT)

31 July 2024
21:00

Boxscore

France	12–17	Spain
Pts: four players 3		Pts: Ygueravide 9

Place de la Concorde, Paris
Referees: Shi Qirong (CHN), Kim Ga-in (KOR)

1 August 2024
18:00

Boxscore

China	14–11	Spain
Pts: Wang 5		Pts: Camilión 7

Place de la Concorde, Paris
Referees: Vlad Ghizdareanu (ROU), Marek Maliszewski (POL)

1 August 2024
21:30

Boxscore

Spain	11–17	United States
Pts: Gimeno 5		Pts: Howard, Van Lith 5

Place de la Concorde, Paris
Referees: Shi Qirong (CHN), Marek Maliszewski (POL)

2 August 2024
12:30

Boxscore

Australia	17–21	Spain
Pts: Whittle 7		Pts: Gimeno, Ygueravide 9

Place de la Concorde, Paris
Referees: Marek Maliszewski (POL), Deanna Jackson (USA)

2 August 2024
21:00

Boxscore

Canada	20–22 (OT)	Spain
Pts: M. Plouffe 11		Pts: Ygueravide 10

Place de la Concorde, Paris
Referees: Shi Qirong (CHN), Markos Michaelides (SUI)

3 August 2024
18:00

Boxscore

Spain	15–18	Germany
Pts: Alonso de Armiño 5		Pts: Greinacher, Reichert 5

Place de la Concorde, Paris
Referees: Najib Chajiddine (FRA), Shi Qirong (CHN)

Semifinal

5 August 2024
17:30

Boxscore

Spain	18–16 (OT)	United States
Pts: Ygueravide 9		Pts: Van Lith 8

Place de la Concorde, Paris
Referees: Shi Qirong (CHN), Marek Maliszewski (POL)

Gold medal game

5 August 2024
22:00

Boxscore

Germany	17–16	Spain
Pts: Greinacher 5		Pts: Camilión 6

Place de la Concorde, Paris
Referees: Edmond Ho (HKG), Brigitta Csabai-Kaskötő (HUN)

== Boxing ==
Spain entered six boxers into the Olympic tournament. Tokyo 2020 Olympian José Quiles (men's featherweight), with Laura Fuertes (women's flyweight) slated to become the country's first female boxer in history at the Games, secured the spots on the Spanish squad in their respective weight divisions by advancing to the semifinal match at the 2023 European Games in Nowy Targ, Poland. Enmanuel Reyes (men's heavyweight) later qualified through the 2024 World Boxing Olympic Qualification Tournament 1 in Busto Arsizio, Italy, and Rafael Lozano (men's flyweight), Oier Ibarretxe (men's lightweight) and Ayoub Ghadfa (men's super heavyweight) also qualified through the 2024 World Boxing Olympic Qualification Tournament 2 in Bangkok, Thailand.

Athlete	Event	Round of 32	Round of 16	Quarterfinals	Semifinals	Final	
Athlete	Event	Opposition Result	Opposition Result	Opposition Result	Opposition Result	Opposition Result	Rank
Rafael Lozano	Men's 51 kg	Bye	Chothia (AUS); W 4–1	Alcántara (DOM); L 2–3	Did not advance		5
José Quiles	Men's 57 kg	Bye	Sabyrkhan (KAZ); W 4–1	Khalokov (UZB); L 0–5	Did not advance		5
Oier Ibarretxe	Men's 63.5 kg	Mukhammedsabyr (KAZ); L 0–5	Did not advance				
Enmanuel Reyes	Men's 92 kg	—N/a	Han (CHN); W 4–1	Schelstaete (BEL); W 5–0	Alfonso (AZE); L 1–4	Did not advance	3rd place, bronze medalist(s)
Ayoub Ghadfa	Men's +92 kg	—N/a	Kunkabayev (KAZ); W 3–2	Chaloyan (ARM); W 5–0	Aboudou Moindze (FRA); W 5–0	Jalolov (UZB); L 0–5	2nd place, silver medalist(s)
Laura Fuertes	Women's 50 kg	Herrera (MEX); L 2–3	Did not advance				

== Canoeing ==
=== Slalom ===
Spanish canoeists qualified boats in four classes through the 2023 ICF Canoe Slalom World Championships in Lee Valley, Great Britain. On 7 April 2024, the Royal Spanish Canoeing Federation (RFEP) announced the canoeists selected for the Games, and on 9 June 2024, Manuel Ochoa earned an extra quota in Kayak Cross through reaching the final at the 2024 ICF Kayak Cross Global Qualification Tournament held in Prague, Czech Republic.

==== Canoe slalom ====
Athlete	Event	Preliminary						Semifinal		Final	
Athlete	Event	Run 1	Rank	Run 2	Rank	Best	Rank	Time	Rank	Time	Rank
Miquel Travé	Men's C-1	92.19	5	143.45	18	92.19	6 Q	96.69	2 Q	97.92	5
Pau Echaniz	Men's K-1	87.84	9	88.37	7	87.84	12 Q	96.11	12 Q	88.87	3rd place, bronze medalist(s)
Miren Lazkano	Women's C-1	109.49	10	113.60	15	109.49	15 Q	116.27	10 Q	116.97	10
Maialen Chourraut	Women's K-1	101.06	17	96.33	11	96.33	13 Q	106.21	11 Q	157.67	12

==== Kayak cross ====
Athlete	Event	Time trial	Rank	Round 1	Repechage	Heat	Quarterfinal	Semifinal	Final	
Athlete	Event	Time trial	Rank	Position	Position	Position	Position	Position	Position	Rank
Manuel Ochoa	Men's KX-1	68.66	10	1 Q	Bye	1 Q	4	Did not advance		14
Miquel Travé	Men's KX-1	68.70	11	1 Q	Bye	4	Did not advance			25
Maialen Chourraut	Women's KX-1	75.23	19	3 R	2 Q	2 Q	3	Did not advance		12
Miren Lazkano	Women's KX-1	74.77	15	1 Q	Bye	3	Did not advance			17

=== Sprint ===
Spanish canoeists qualified eight boats at the 2023 ICF Canoe Sprint World Championships in Duisburg, Germany, with some of the canoeists later selected during the national trials held by the RFEP in April 2024. An additional boat (men's C-1) was later qualified at the 2024 European Canoe Sprint Qualifier held in Szeged, Hungary.

Men

Athlete	Event	Heats		Quarterfinals		Semifinals		Final	
Athlete	Event	Time	Rank	Time	Rank	Time	Rank	Time	Rank
Pablo Crespo	C-1 1000 m	4:05.05	5 q	3:50.24	2 Q	4:03.04	8 FB	3:50.54	12
Diego Domínguez; Joan Antoni Moreno	C-2 500 m	1:37.78	2 Q	Bye		1:40.23	4 FA	1:41.18	3rd place, bronze medalist(s)
Francisco Cubelos	K-1 1000 m	3:28.40	3 q	3:33.74	2 Q	3:30.52	5 FB	3:28.10	11
Adrián del Río	K-1 1000 m	3:33.81	5 q	3:30.39	1 Q	3:31.07	6 FB	3:29.42	12
Carlos Arévalo; Rodrigo Germade	K-2 500 m	1:28.85	2 Q	Bye		1:28.49	5 FB	1:30.08	9
Adrián del Río; Marcus Walz	K-2 500 m	1:35.26	3 q	1:29.12	1 Q	1:27.24	2 FA	1:27.38	4
Carlos Arévalo; Saúl Craviotto; Rodrigo Germade; Marcus Walz	K-4 500 m	1:20.60	2 Q	Bye		1:19.98	3 FA	1:20.05	3rd place, bronze medalist(s)

Women

Athlete	Event	Heats		Quarterfinals		Semifinals		Final	
Athlete	Event	Time	Rank	Time	Rank	Time	Rank	Time	Rank
María Corbera	C-1 200 m	47.74	2 Q	Bye		45.78	5 FB	45.45	9
Antía Jácome	C-1 200 m	47.35	2 Q	Bye		45.62	3 FA	44.78	4
María Corbera; Antía Jácome	C-2 500 m	1:55.63	2 Q	Bye		1:56.55	2 FA	1:56.65	6
Estefanía Fernández	K-1 500 m	1:54.74	6 q	1:51.24	2 Q	1:56.20	7	Did not advance	
Begoña Lazkano	K-1 500 m	1:55.54	4 q	1:53.83	4 Q	1:52.87	7	Did not advance	
Carolina García; Sara Ouzande	K-2 500 m	1:49.01	5 q	1:42.03	3 Q	1:40.23	6 FB	DNF	16
Estefanía Fernández; Carolina García; Sara Ouzande; Teresa Portela	K-4 500 m	1:32.92	2 FA	—N/a		Bye		1:34.51	6

Qualification Legend: Q = Qualify to semifinals; q = Qualify to quarterfinals; FA = Qualify to final (medal); FB = Qualify to final B (non-medal); FC = Qualify to final C (non-medal)

== Cycling ==
=== Road ===
Spain entered a squad of five riders (three men and two women) to compete in their respective Olympic road races, by virtue of their top 10 national finish (for men) and top 20 (for women) in the UCI World Ranking.

Men

Athlete	Event	Time	Rank
Alex Aranburu	Road race	6:21:47	18
Juan Ayuso	Road race	6:21:54	22
Oier Lazkano	Road race	6:23:16	35
Oier Lazkano	Time trial	39:08.86	26

Women

Athlete	Event	Time	Rank
Mireia Benito	Time trial	43:48.10	22
Mireia Benito	Road race	4:10:20	63
Mavi García	Road race	4:00:46	6

=== Track ===
Spanish riders accumulated spots for both men's madison and omnium, based on the country's results in the final UCI Olympic rankings.

Omnium

Athlete	Event	Scratch race		Tempo race		Elimination race		Points race	Total points	Rank
Athlete	Event	Rank	Points	Rank	Points	Rank	Points	Points	Total points	Rank
Albert Torres	Men's omnium	8	26	7	28	13	16	57	127	4

Madison

Athlete	Event	Points	Laps	Rank
Sebastián Mora; Albert Torres	Men's madison	15	−20	8

=== Mountain biking ===
Spanish mountain bikers qualified for two men's quota places into the Olympic cross-country race, as a result of the nation's top-eight finish for men in the final UCI Olympic ranking. On 28 May 2024, the two selected bikers were confirmed by the Royal Spanish Cycling Federation (RFEC).

Athlete	Event	Time	Rank
Jofre Cullell	Men's cross-country	1:32:13	24
David Valero	Men's cross-country	1:28:49	10

== Diving ==
Spanish divers secured a quota place for the Games by advancing to the top twelve final of the women's individual platform at the 2023 World Aquatics Championships in Fukuoka, Japan; another quota in the men's synchronized springboard by achieving the top four in the final at the 2024 World Aquatics Championships in Doha, Qatar; and finally, a reallocated quota in the women's springboard.

Athlete	Event	Preliminary		Semifinal		Final	
Athlete	Event	Points	Rank	Points	Rank	Points	Rank
Adrián Abadía; Nicolás García	Men's 3 m synchronized springboard	—N/a				361.62	6
Valeria Antolino	Women's 3 m springboard	297.70	7 Q	284.25	10 Q	292.95	8
Ana Carvajal	Women's 10 m platform	285.60	12 Q	276.90	14	Did not advance	

== Equestrian ==
Spanish equestrians have qualified full squads in both the team dressage competition (through the 2023 European Championships in Riesenbeck, Germany) and the team jumping competition (through the 2023 European Championships in Milan, Italy). Additionally, they earned two individual quotas in the eventing competition through the Olympic Ranking finished at the end of 2023. In dressage, José Daniel Martín was originally selected to compete with 'Malagueño LXIII', but he was later forced to withdrawn his horse, so Claudio Castilla with 'Hi Rico Do Sobral' replaced them.

=== Dressage ===
Athlete	Horse	Event	Grand Prix		Grand Prix Special		Grand Prix Freestyle		Overall	
Athlete	Horse	Event	Score	Rank	Score	Rank	Technical	Artistic	Score	Rank
Borja Carrascosa	Frizzantino FRH	Individual	70.823	28	—N/a		Did not advance			
Claudio Castilla	Hi Rico Do Sobral	Individual	69.829	36	—N/a		Did not advance			
Juan Antonio Jiménez	Euclides Mor	Individual	60.031	59	—N/a		Did not advance			
Borja Carrascosa; Claudio Castilla; Juan Antonio Jiménez	See above	Team	200.683	13	Did not advance		—N/a		Did not advance	

Qualification Legend: Q = Qualified for the final; q = Qualified for the final as a lucky loser
TF = Substituted for the team final

=== Eventing ===
Athlete	Horse	Event	Dressage		Cross-country			Jumping						Total	
Athlete	Horse	Event	Dressage		Cross-country			Qualifier			Final			Total	
Athlete	Horse	Event	Penalties	Rank	Penalties	Total	Rank	Penalties	Total	Rank	Penalties	Total	Rank	Penalties	Rank
Esteban Benítez	Utrera AA 35 1	Individual	39.90	58	29.00	68.90	50	29.20	98.10	49	Did not advance			98.10	49
Carlos Díaz	Taraje CP 21.10	Individual	30.20	24	17.60	47.80	35	Withdrawn							

=== Jumping ===
Athlete	Horse	Event	Qualification			Final		
Athlete	Horse	Event	Penalties	Time	Rank	Penalties	Time	Rank
Eduardo Álvarez Aznar	Rockfeller de Pleville Bois Margot	Individual	Retired					
Sergio Álvarez Moya	Puma HS	Individual	13	79.75	60	Did not advance		
Ismael García Roque	Tirano	Individual	4	76.97	39	Did not advance		
Eduardo Álvarez Aznar; Sergio Álvarez Moya; Ismael García Roque	See above	Team	21	231.90	11	Did not advance		

== Fencing ==
Spain entered two fencers into the Olympic competition. Lucía Martín-Portugués secured a spot in the women's sabre as one of the two highest-ranked fencers vying for qualification from Europe in the FIE Adjusted Official Rankings, while Carlos Llavador later received a reallocated quota from FIE in the men's foil.

Athlete	Event	Round of 64	Round of 32	Round of 16	Quarterfinal	Semifinal	Final / BM	
Athlete	Event	Opposition Score	Opposition Score	Opposition Score	Opposition Score	Opposition Score	Opposition Score	Rank
Carlos Llavador	Men's foil	—N/a	Ha (KOR); W 15–13	Hamza (EGY); L 12–15	Did not advance			
Lucía Martín-Portugués	Women's sabre	—N/a	Márton (HUN); L 8–15	Did not advance				

== Field hockey ==
Summary

Key:

- FT – After full-time.
- P – Match decided by penalty-shootout.

Team	Event	Group stage						Quarterfinal	Semifinal	Final / BM	
Team	Event	Opposition Score	Opposition Score	Opposition Score	Opposition Score	Opposition Score	Rank	Opposition Score	Opposition Score	Opposition Score	Rank
Spain men's	Men's tournament	Great Britain; L 0–4	Germany; W 2–0	France; D 3–3	South Africa; W 3–0	Netherlands; L 3–5	4 Q	Belgium; W 3–2	Netherlands; L 0–4	India; L 1–2	4
Spain women's	Women's tournament	Great Britain; W 2–1	United States; D 1–1	Argentina; L 2–1	South Africa; W 1–0	Australia; L 1–3	3 Q	Belgium; L 0–2	Did not advance		7

=== Men's tournament ===
Spain men's national field hockey team qualified for the Olympics after a top three finish at the 2024 FIH Olympic Qualifiers in Valencia, Spain.

Team roster

Spain announced their squad on 13 June 2024.

Head coach: (Argentina) Maximiliano Caldas

No.	Pos.	Player	Date of birth (age)	Caps	Club
2	DF	Alejandro Alonso	14 February 1999 (aged 25)	93	(Spain) Tenis
5	DF	Jordi Bonastre	7 August 2000 (aged 23)	73	(Spain) Atlètic Terrassa
6	DF	Xavier Gispert	1 April 1999 (aged 25)	77	(Spain) Club Egara
7	FW	Rafael Vilallonga	28 November 2001 (aged 22)	48	(Spain) Club de Campo
8	MF	Pepe Cunill	9 July 2001 (aged 23)	60	(Spain) Atlètic Terrassa
9	FW	Álvaro Iglesias (Captain)	1 March 1993 (aged 31)	231	(Spain) Club de Campo
10	FW	José Basterra	3 January 1997 (aged 27)	73	(Spain) Club de Campo
11	MF	Gerard Clapés	13 September 2000 (aged 23)	67	(Netherlands) Oranje-Rood
12	FW	Marc Reyné	18 May 1999 (aged 25)	65	(Spain) Real Club de Polo
14	MF	Marc Miralles	14 November 1997 (aged 26)	115	(Netherlands) Bloemendaal
15	GK	Luis Calzado	15 November 2000 (aged 23)	41	(Spain) Real Club de Polo
17	DF	Marc Recasens	13 September 1999 (aged 24)	90	(Spain) Real Club de Polo
18	MF	Joaquín Menini	18 August 1991 (aged 32)	63	(Netherlands) Rotterdam
19		Marc Vizcaino	30 April 1999 (aged 25)	21	(Spain) Atlètic Terrassa
21	FW	Borja Lacalle	21 May 2001 (aged 23)	56	(Spain) Club de Campo
23	MF	Eduard de Ignacio-Simó	3 March 2000 (aged 24)	27	(Spain) CD Terrassa
24	DF	Ignacio Rodríguez	12 June 1996 (aged 28)	120	(Spain) Club de Campo
26	FW	Bruno Font	15 November 2004 (aged 19)	25	(Spain) Junior FC

Group play

Pos	Team	Pld	W	D	L	GF	GA	GD	Pts	Qualification
1	Germany	5	4	0	1	16	6	+10	12	Advance to quarter-finals
2	Netherlands	5	3	1	1	16	9	+7	10	Advance to quarter-finals
3	Great Britain	5	2	2	1	11	7	+4	8	Advance to quarter-finals
4	Spain	5	2	1	2	11	12	−1	7	Advance to quarter-finals
5	South Africa	5	1	1	3	11	17	−6	4	
6	France (H)	5	0	1	4	8	22	−14	1	

Source: FIH
Rules for classification: 1) points; 2) matches won; 3) goal difference; 4) goals for; 5) head-to-head result; 6) field goals scored.
(H) Hosts

27 July 2024
10:00
v

Great Britain	4–0	Spain
Park 13'; Furlong 16', 48'; Shipperley 58'	Report

Pitch 1
Umpires:
Steve Rogers (AUS)
Raghu Prasad (IND)

28 July 2024
17:00
v

Germany	0–2	Spain
	Report	Basterra 32'; Cunill 53'

Pitch 1
Umpires:
Jonas van 't Hek (NED)
Martin Madden (GBR)

30 July 2024
10:00
v

Spain	3–3	France
Iglesias 28'; Vilallonga 32'; Cunill 51'	Report	Clément 8', 13'; Martin-Brisac 45'

Pitch 1
Umpires:
Lim Hong Zhen (SGP)
Coen van Bunge (NED)

31 July 2024
19:45
v

Spain	3–0	South Africa
Reyne 25', 53'; Basterra 37'	Report

Pitch 1
Umpires:
Gareth Greenfield (NZL)
Ben Göntgen (GER)

2 August 2024
10:30
v

Netherlands	5–3	Spain
Janssen 19', 53'; Hoedemakers 40', 48'; Wortelboer 43'	Report	Basterra 7'; Reyné 15'; Miralles 48'

Pitch 2
Umpires:
Dan Barstow (GBR)
Sean Rapaport (RSA)

Quarterfinal

4 August 2024
12:30
v

Belgium	2–3	Spain
De Sloover 41'; Hendrickx 58'	Report	Basterra 40'; Reyné 55'; Miralles 57'

Pitch 1
Umpires:
Gabriel Labate (ARG)
Jonas van 't Hek (NED)

Semifinal

6 August 2024
14:00
v

Netherlands	4–0	Spain
Janssen 12'; Brinkman 20' van Dam 32'; Telgenkamp 50'	Report

Pitch 1
Umpires:
Ben Göntgen (GER)
Martin Madden (GBR)

Bronze medal game

8 August 2024
14:00
v

(bronze) India	2–1	Spain
Harmanpreet 30', 33'	Report	Miralles 18'

Pitch 1
Umpires:
Coen van Bunge (NED)
Ben Göntgen (GER)

=== Women's tournament ===
Spain women's national field hockey team qualified for the Olympics after a top three finish at the 2024 FIH Olympic Qualifiers in Valencia, Spain.

Team roster

The squad was announced on 29 June 2024.

Head coach: Carlos García Cuenca

No.	Pos.	Player	Date of birth (age)	Caps	Goals	Club
2	DF	Laura Barrios	4 September 2000 (aged 23)	54	6	(Spain) RC Polo
4	FW	Sara Barrios	4 September 2000 (aged 23)	42	7	(Spain) RC Polo
7	MF	Júlia Strappato	16 January 2000 (aged 24)	41	0	(Spain) Club de Campo
8	MF	Lucía Jiménez	8 January 1997 (aged 27)	179	23	(Germany) Mannheim
9	DF	María López (Captain)	16 February 1990 (aged 34)	249	43	(Spain) Club de Campo
10	FW	Belén Iglesias	6 July 1996 (aged 28)	105	23	(Spain) Club de Campo
11	FW	Marta Segú	22 June 1995 (aged 29)	115	37	(Spain) RC Polo
13	DF	Constanza Amundson	12 February 1998 (aged 26)	41	1	(Spain) RC Polo
14	FW	Blanca Pérez	17 September 2003 (aged 20)	10	0	(Spain) Club de Campo
17	DF	Lola Riera	25 June 1991 (aged 33)	205	146	(Spain) Sanse Complutense
19	FW	Begoña García	19 July 1995 (aged 29)	173	42	(Spain) Club de Campo
20	DF	Xantal Giné	23 September 1992 (aged 31)	202	15	(Spain) RC Polo
21	MF	Beatriz Pérez	4 May 1991 (aged 33)	261	53	(Spain) Club de Campo
24	MF	Alejandra Torres-Quevedo	30 September 1999 (aged 24)	93	7	(Spain) Club de Campo
26	GK	Clara Pérez	26 July 2001 (aged 23)	25	0	(Spain) Atlètic Terrassa
30	FW	Patricia Álvarez	4 March 1998 (aged 26)	39	7	(Spain) RC Polo

Group play

Pos	Team	Pld	W	D	L	GF	GA	GD	Pts	Qualification
1	Australia	5	4	1	0	15	5	+10	13	Quarter-finals
2	Argentina	5	4	1	0	16	7	+9	13	Quarter-finals
3	Spain	5	2	1	2	6	7	−1	7	Quarter-finals
4	Great Britain	5	2	0	3	8	12	−4	6	Quarter-finals
5	United States	5	1	1	3	5	13	−8	4	
6	South Africa	5	0	0	5	4	10	−6	0	

Source: FIH
Rules for classification: 1) points; 2) matches won; 3) goal difference; 4) goals for; 5) head-to-head result; 6) field goals scored.

28 July 2024
13:15
v

Great Britain	1–2	Spain
Ansley 4'	Report	L. Barrios 4'; Riera 9'

Pitch 2
Umpires:
Annelize Rostron (RSA)
Liu Xiaoying (CHN)

29 July 2024
13:15
v

Spain	1–1	United States
García 20'	Report	Gladieux 14'

Pitch 2
Umpires:
Cookie Tan (SGP)
Rachel Williams (GBR)

31 July 2024
10:00
v

Argentina	2–1	Spain
Gorzelany 6'; Trinchinetti 21'	Report	Riera 34'

Pitch 1
Umpires:
Hannah Harrison (GBR)
Alison Keogh (IRE)

1 August 2024
17:30
v

Spain	1–0	South Africa
Iglesias 15'	Report

Pitch 2
Umpires:
Emi Yamada (JPN)
Hannah Harrison (GBR)

3 August 2024
12:45
v

Australia	3–1	Spain
Arnott 2'; Kershaw 55'; Nobbs 59'	Report	Riera 43'

Pitch 1
Umpires:
Ayanna McClean (TTO)
Amber Church (NZL)

Quarterfinal

5 August 2024
20:00
v

Belgium	2–0	Spain
Marien 46'; Englebert 49'	Report

Pitch 1
Umpires:
Alison Keogh (IRE)
Ayanna McClean (TTO)

== Football ==
Summary

Key:

- A.E.T – After extra time.
- P – Match decided by penalty-shootout.

Team	Event	Group Stage				Quarterfinal	Semifinal	Final / BM	
Team	Event	Opposition Score	Opposition Score	Opposition Score	Rank	Opposition Score	Opposition Score	Opposition Score	Rank
Spain men's	Men's tournament	Uzbekistan; W 2–1	Dominican Republic; W 3–1	Egypt; L 1–2	2 Q	Japan; W 3–0	Morocco; W 2–1	France; W 5–3 (a.e.t.)	1st place, gold medalist(s)
Spain women's	Women's tournament	Japan; W 2–1	Nigeria; W 1–0	Brazil; W 2–0	1 Q	Colombia; W 2–2 (a.e.t.) 4–2^{P}	Brazil; L 2–4	Germany; L 0–1	4

=== Men's tournament ===
Spain men's football team qualified for the Olympics by advancing to the semifinals of the 2023 UEFA European Under-21 Championship in Georgia and Romania.

Team roster

Spain announced their initial 22-men squad on 26 June 2024. The final squad was announced on 10 July.

Head coach: Santi Denia

No.	Pos.	Player	Date of birth (age)	Caps	Goals	Club
1	GK	Arnau Tenas	30 May 2001 (aged 23)	0	0	(French Football Federation) Paris Saint-Germain
2	DF	Marc Pubill	20 June 2003 (aged 21)	0	0	(Royal Spanish Football Federation) Almería
3	DF	Juan Miranda*	19 January 2000 (aged 24)	5	0	(Royal Spanish Football Federation) Real Betis
4	DF	Eric García	9 January 2001 (aged 23)	7	0	(Royal Spanish Football Federation) Girona
5	DF	Pau Cubarsí	22 January 2007 (aged 17)	0	0	(Royal Spanish Football Federation) Barcelona
6	MF	Pablo Barrios	15 June 2003 (aged 21)	0	0	(Royal Spanish Football Federation) Atlético Madrid
7	FW	Diego López	13 May 2002 (aged 22)	0	0	(Royal Spanish Football Federation) Valencia
8	MF	Beñat Turrientes	31 January 2002 (aged 22)	0	0	(Royal Spanish Football Federation) Real Sociedad
9	FW	Abel Ruiz* (captain)	28 January 2000 (aged 24)	0	0	(Portuguese Football Federation) Braga
10	MF	Álex Baena	20 July 2001 (aged 23)	0	0	(Royal Spanish Football Federation) Villarreal
11	FW	Fermín López	11 May 2003 (aged 21)	0	0	(Royal Spanish Football Federation) Barcelona
12	DF	Jon Pacheco	8 January 2001 (aged 23)	0	0	(Royal Spanish Football Federation) Real Sociedad
13	GK	Joan García	4 May 2001 (aged 23)	0	0	(Royal Spanish Football Federation) Espanyol
14	MF	Aimar Oroz	27 November 2001 (aged 22)	0	0	(Royal Spanish Football Federation) Osasuna
15	DF	Miguel Gutiérrez	27 July 2001 (aged 22)	0	0	(Royal Spanish Football Federation) Girona
16	MF	Adrián Bernabé	26 May 2001 (aged 23)	0	0	(Italian Football Federation) Parma
17	FW	Sergio Gómez*	4 September 2000 (aged 23)	0	0	(The Football Association) Manchester City
18	FW	Samu Aghehowa	5 May 2004 (aged 20)	0	0	(Royal Spanish Football Federation) Alavés
19	DF	Cristhian Mosquera	27 June 2004 (aged 20)	0	0	(Royal Spanish Football Federation) Valencia
20	DF	Juanlu Sánchez	15 August 2003 (aged 20)	0	0	(Royal Spanish Football Federation) Sevilla
21	FW	Sergio Camello	10 February 2001 (aged 23)	0	0	(Royal Spanish Football Federation) Rayo Vallecano
22	GK	Alejandro Iturbe	2 September 2003 (aged 20)	0	0	(Royal Spanish Football Federation) Atlético Madrid

* Overage player.

Group play

Pos	Team	Pld	W	D	L	GF	GA	GD	Pts	Qualification
1	Egypt	3	2	1	0	3	1	+2	7	Advance to knockout stage
2	Spain	3	2	0	1	6	4	+2	6	Advance to knockout stage
3	Dominican Republic	3	0	2	1	2	4	−2	2	
4	Uzbekistan	3	0	1	2	2	4	−2	1	

Source: FIFA
Rules for classification: Group stage tiebreakers
24 July 2024
15:00

Uzbekistan	1–2	Spain
Shomurodov 45+3' (pen.)	Report	Pubill 28'; Gómez 62'

Parc des Princes, Paris
Attendance: 33,732
Referee: Dahane Beida (Mauritania)

27 July 2024
15:00

Dominican Republic	1–3	Spain
Montes de Oca 38'	Report	López 24'; Baena 55'; Gutiérrez 70'

Stade de Bordeaux, Bordeaux
Attendance: 16,099
Referee: Adel Al-Naqbi (United Arab Emirates)

30 July 2024
15:00

Spain	1–2	Egypt
Aghehowa 90'	Report	Adel 40', 62'

Stade de Bordeaux, Bordeaux
Attendance: 12,180
Referee: Drew Fischer (Canada)

Quarterfinal

2 August 2024
17:00

Japan	0–3	Spain
	Report	López 11', 73'; Ruiz 86'

Stade de Lyon, Décines-Charpieu
Attendance: 19,111
Referee: Dahane Beida (Mauritania)

Semi-final

5 August 2024
18:00

Morocco	1–2	Spain
Rahimi 37' (pen.)	Report	López 65'; Juanlu 86'

Stade de Marseille, Marseille
Attendance: 59,882
Referee: Ilgiz Tantashev (Uzbekistan) (substituted off) 17'
Glenn Nyberg (Sweden) (substituted on) 17'

Gold medal match

9 August 2024
18:00

France	3–5 (a.e.t.)	Spain
Millot 11'; Akliouche 79'; Mateta 90+3' (pen.)	Report	López 18', 25'; Baena 28'; Camello 100', 120+1'

Parc des Princes, Paris
Attendance: 44,260
Referee: Ramon Abatti (Brazil)

=== Women's tournament ===
Spain women's football team qualified for the Olympics by advancing to the final of the 2023–24 UEFA Women's Nations League.

Team roster

Spain named a squad of 18 players and 4 alternates for the tournament on 3 July 2024.

Head coach: Montserrat Tomé

No.	Pos.	Player	Date of birth (age)	Caps	Goals	Club
1	GK	Misa Rodríguez	23 July 1999 (aged 25)	23	0	(Royal Spanish Football Federation) Real Madrid
2	DF	Ona Batlle	10 June 1999 (aged 25)	48	2	(Royal Spanish Football Federation) Barcelona
3	MF	Teresa Abelleira	9 January 2000 (aged 24)	33	3	(Royal Spanish Football Federation) Real Madrid
4	DF	Irene Paredes (captain)	4 July 1991 (aged 33)	107	12	(Royal Spanish Football Federation) Barcelona
5	DF	Oihane Hernández	4 May 2000 (aged 24)	23	1	(Royal Spanish Football Federation) Real Madrid
6	MF	Aitana Bonmatí	18 January 1998 (aged 26)	64	25	(Royal Spanish Football Federation) Barcelona
7	MF	Athenea del Castillo	24 October 2000 (aged 23)	45	12	(Royal Spanish Football Federation) Real Madrid
8	FW	Mariona Caldentey	19 March 1996 (aged 28)	73	26	(Royal Spanish Football Federation) Barcelona
9	FW	Salma Paralluelo	13 November 2003 (aged 20)	26	12	(Royal Spanish Football Federation) Barcelona
10	FW	Jenni Hermoso	9 May 1990 (aged 34)	117	56	(Mexican Football Federation) Tigres UANL
11	MF	Alexia Putellas	4 February 1994 (aged 30)	119	30	(Royal Spanish Football Federation) Barcelona
12	MF	Patricia Guijarro	17 May 1998 (aged 26)	54	11	(Royal Spanish Football Federation) Barcelona
13	GK	Cata Coll	23 April 2001 (aged 23)	12	0	(Royal Spanish Football Federation) Barcelona
14	DF	Laia Aleixandri	25 August 2000 (aged 23)	29	2	(The Football Association) Manchester City
15	MF	Eva Navarro	27 January 2001 (aged 23)	23	5	(Royal Spanish Football Federation) Atlético Madrid
16	DF	Laia Codina	22 January 2000 (aged 24)	15	2	(The Football Association) Arsenal
17	FW	Lucía García	14 July 1998 (aged 26)	48	11	(The Football Association) Manchester United
18	DF	Olga Carmona	12 June 2000 (aged 24)	42	3	(Royal Spanish Football Federation) Real Madrid
19	MF	Vicky López	26 July 2006 (aged 17)	4	0	(Royal Spanish Football Federation) Barcelona
20	DF	María Méndez	10 April 2001 (aged 23)	8	2	(Royal Spanish Football Federation) Levante
21	FW	Alba Redondo	27 August 1996 (aged 27)	37	14	(Royal Spanish Football Federation) Levante
22	GK	Elene Lete	7 May 2002 (aged 22)	1	0	(Royal Spanish Football Federation) Real Sociedad

Group play

Pos	Team	Pld	W	D	L	GF	GA	GD	Pts	Qualification
1	Spain	3	3	0	0	5	1	+4	9	Advance to knockout stage
2	Japan	3	2	0	1	6	4	+2	6	Advance to knockout stage
3	Brazil	3	1	0	2	2	4	−2	3	Advance to knockout stage
4	Nigeria	3	0	0	3	1	5	−4	0	

Source: FIFA
Rules for classification: Group stage tiebreakers
25 July 2024
17:00

Spain	2–1	Japan
Bonmatí 22'; Caldentey 74'	Report	Fujino 13'

Stade de la Beaujoire, Nantes
Attendance: 10,377
Referee: Bouchra Karboubi (Morocco)

28 July 2024
19:00

Spain	1–0	Nigeria
Putellas 85'	Report

Stade de la Beaujoire, Nantes
Attendance: 11,079
Referee: Tori Penso (United States)

31 July 2024
17:00

Brazil	0–2	Spain
	Report	Del Castillo 68'; Putellas 90+17'

Stade de Bordeaux, Bordeaux
Attendance: 14,497
Referee: Espen Eskås (Norway)

Quarterfinal

3 August 2024
17:00

Spain	2–2 (a.e.t.)	Colombia
Hermoso 79'; Paredes 90+7'	Report	Ramírez 12'; Santos 52'
Penalties
Caldentey (penalty scored); Navarro (penalty scored); Paralluelo (penalty scored); Bonmatí (penalty scored)	4–2	(penalty missed) Usme; (penalty scored) Vanegas; (penalty missed) Salazar; (penalty scored) Carabalí

Stade de Lyon, Décines-Charpieu
Attendance: 10,355
Referee: Katia García (Mexico)

Semi-final

6 August 2024
21:00

Brazil	4–2	Spain
Paredes 6' (o.g.); Gabi Portilho 45+4'; Adriana 71'; Kerolin 90+1'	Report	Duda Sampaio 85' (o.g.); Paralluelo 90+12'

Stade de Marseille, Marseille
Attendance: 14,201
Referee: Rebecca Welch (Great Britain)

Bronze medal match

9 August 2024
15:00

Spain	0–1	Germany
	Report	Gwinn 65' (pen.)

Stade de Lyon, Décines-Charpieu
Attendance: 10,995
Referee: Katia García (Mexico)

== Golf ==
Spain entered two men and two women into the Olympic tournament as they qualified directly among the top 60 eligible players per gender category, based on their corresponding IGF World Rankings.

Athlete	Event	Round 1	Round 2	Round 3	Round 4	Total		
Athlete	Event	Score	Score	Score	Score	Score	Par	Rank
David Puig	Men's	69	69	70	75	283	−1	T40
Jon Rahm	Men's	67	66	66	70	269	−15	T5
Azahara Muñoz	Women's	78	69	69	69	285	−3	T13
Carlota Ciganda	Women's	73	78	75	75	301	+13	T49

== Gymnastics ==
=== Artistic ===
The Spanish men's squad secured one of the remaining nine places in the team all-around at the 2023 World Championships in Antwerp, Belgium. Additionally, Spain secured two individual places for the women's all-around event at the same championships, and a third one at the 2024 FIG Artistic Gymnastics World Cup series.

Men
Team

Athlete	Event	Qualification								Final							
Athlete	Event	Apparatus						Total	Rank	Apparatus						Total	Rank
Athlete	Event	F	PH	R	V	PB	HB	Total	Rank	F	PH	R	V	PB	HB	Total	Rank
Néstor Abad	Team	14.000	13.166	13.600	14.500	10.766	13.300	79.332	35	Did not advance							
Thierno Diallo	Team	—N/a	~~11.866~~	—N/a		12.966	~~12.933~~	—N/a		Did not advance							
Nicolau Mir	Team	~~13.666~~	12.666	~~12.966~~	~~12.733~~	~~7.466~~	13.333	72.830	44	Did not advance							
Joel Plata	Team	14.166	13.566	13.433	12.933	12.433	13.666	80.197	27	Did not advance							
Ray Zapata	Team	14.600 Q	—N/a	13.900	14.300	—N/a				Did not advance							
Total	Team	42.766	39.398	40.933	41.733	36.165	40.299	241.294	12	Did not advance							

Individual

Athlete	Event	Qualification								Final							
Athlete	Event	Apparatus						Total	Rank	Apparatus						Total	Rank
Athlete	Event	F	PH	R	V	PB	HB	Total	Rank	F	PH	R	V	PB	HB	Total	Rank
Ray Zapata	Floor	14.600	—N/a						3 Q	14.333	—N/a					14.333	7

Women
Individual

Athlete	Event	Qualification						Final					
Athlete	Event	Apparatus				Total	Rank	Apparatus				Total	Rank
Athlete	Event	F	V	UB	BB	Total	Rank	F	V	UB	BB	Total	Rank
Laura Casabuena	All-around	13.033	13.066	13.133	12.166	51.398	35	Did not advance					
Ana Pérez	All-around	12.866	13.066	13.033	11.800	50.765	45	Did not advance					
Alba Petisco	All-around	11.800	13.466	13.400	12.633	51.299	36	Did not advance					

=== Rhythmic ===
Spain entered a squad of rhythmic gymnasts to compete in the group all-around competition, following the nation's successful third-place finish in the qualifying round at the 2022 World Championships in Sofia, Bulgaria. Additionally, Spain also entered two individual gymnasts through achieving the top-20 in the individual all-round of the 2023 World Championships in Valencia, Spain.

Athlete	Event	Qualification						Final					
Athlete	Event	Hoop	Ball	Clubs	Ribbon	Total	Rank	Hoop	Ball	Clubs	Ribbon	Total	Rank
Alba Bautista	Individual	31.100	28.100	30.800	27.650	117.650	20	Did not advance					
Polina Berezina	Individual	29.700	32.750	32.450	30.200	125.100	15	Did not advance					

Athletes	Event	Qualification				Final			
Athletes	Event	5 apps	3+2 apps	Total	Rank	5 apps.	3+2 apps	Total	Rank
Ana Arnau; Inés Bergua; Mireia Martínez; Patricia Pérez; Salma Solaun	Group	30.400	30.000	60.400	10	Did not advance			

=== Trampoline ===
Spain entered two gymnasts in trampoline, one in the men's event and another in the women's event, through the 2023–24 Trampoline World Cup series.

Athlete	Event	Qualification		Final	
Athlete	Event	Score	Rank	Score	Rank
David Vega	Men's	55.620	14	Did not advance	
Noemí Romero	Women's	54.250	9	Did not advance	

== Handball ==
Summary

Key:

- ET: After extra time
- P – Match decided by penalty-shootout.

Team	Event	Group Stage						Quarterfinal	Semifinal	Final / BM	
Team	Event	Opposition Score	Opposition Score	Opposition Score	Opposition Score	Opposition Score	Rank	Opposition Score	Opposition Score	Opposition Score	Rank
Spain men's	Men's tournament	Slovenia; W 25–22	Sweden; L 26–29	Japan; W 37–33	Germany; L 31–33	Croatia; W 32–31	3 Q	Egypt; W 29–28^{ET}	Germany; L 24–25	Slovenia; W 23–22	3rd place, bronze medalist(s)
Spain women's	Women's tournament	Brazil; L 18–29	Angola; L 21–26	Netherlands; L 24–29	Hungary; L 24–27	France; L 24–32	6	Did not advance			12

=== Men's tournament ===
Spain men's national handball team qualified for the Olympics by securing a top two spot at the Tournament 1 of the 2024 IHF Men's Olympic Qualification Tournaments in Granollers, Spain.

Team roster

A 21-player roster was announced on 10 June 2024. The final squad was revealed on 7 July 2024. On 18 July 2024, Jorge Maqueda replaced Joan Cañellas due to an injury.

Head coach: Jordi Ribera

No.	Pos.	Name	Date of birth (age)	Height	App.	Goals	Club
1	GK	Gonzalo Pérez de Vargas	10 January 1991 (aged 33)	1.90 m	179	18	(Spain) Barça
5	RB	Jorge Maqueda	6 February 1988 (aged 36)	1.95 m	202	497	(Poland) Industria Kielce
10	RB	Alex Dujshebaev	17 December 1992 (aged 31)	1.87 m	152	442	(Poland) Industria Kielce
12	GK	Rodrigo Corrales	24 January 1991 (aged 33)	2.02 m	128	4	(Hungary) Telekom Veszprém
17	P	Adrià Figueras	31 August 1988 (aged 35)	1.92 m	124	335	(France) C' Chartres Métropole
18	RB	Imanol Garciandia	30 April 1995 (aged 29)	2.02 m	50	131	(Hungary) OTP Bank-Pick Szeged
20	P	Abel Serdio	16 April 1994 (aged 30)	1.95 m	40	88	(Poland) Orlen Wisła Płock
25	LB	Agustín Casado	21 May 1996 (aged 28)	1.90 m	46	119	(Hungary) Telekom Veszprém
28	RW	Aleix Gómez	7 May 1997 (aged 27)	1.80 m	83	320	(Spain) Barça
36	CB	Ian Tarrafeta	4 January 1999 (aged 25)	1.88 m	45	101	(France) Pays d'Aix UC
51	LW	Miguel Sánchez-Migallón	8 February 1995 (aged 29)	2.00 m	45	30	(Portugal) SL Benfica
59	LB	Daniel Dujshebaev	4 July 1997 (aged 27)	1.97 m	86	186	(Poland) Industria Kielce
62	RW	Kauldi Odriozola	7 January 1997 (aged 27)	1.83 m	60	170	(France) HBC Nantes
70	LW	Daniel Fernández	28 March 2001 (aged 23)	1.76 m	35	113	(Germany) TVB Stuttgart
99	P	Javier Rodríguez Moreno	22 July 2002 (aged 22)	2.00 m	4	6	(Spain) Barça

Group play

Pos	Team	Pld	W	D	L	GF	GA	GD	Pts	Qualification
1	Germany	5	4	0	1	162	144	+18	8	Quarterfinals
2	Slovenia	5	3	0	2	140	142	−2	6 (Note: Slovenia 2 Pts, +2 GD; Spain 2 Pts, 0 GD; Sweden 2 Pts, −2 GD.)	Quarterfinals
3	Spain	5	3	0	2	151	148	+3	6	Quarterfinals
4	Sweden	5	3	0	2	158	139	+19	6	Quarterfinals
5	Croatia	5	2	0	3	148	156	−8	4	
6	Japan	5	0	0	5	143	173	−30	0	

Source: Olympics Paris 2024 rankings
Rules for classification: 1) Points; 2) Head-to-head points; 3) Head-to-head goal difference; 4) Head-to-head goals scored; 5) Goal difference; 6) Goals scored; 7) Draw.
Notes:

27 July 2024; 09:00	Spain	25–22	Slovenia	Paris Expo Porte de Versailles, Paris; Attendance: 5,776; Referees: C. Bonaventura, J. Bonaventura (FRA)
27 July 2024; 09:00	Gómez 7	(8–11)	Bombač 5	Paris Expo Porte de Versailles, Paris; Attendance: 5,776; Referees: C. Bonaventura, J. Bonaventura (FRA)
27 July 2024; 09:00	3× (suspension)	Report	5× (suspension)	Paris Expo Porte de Versailles, Paris; Attendance: 5,776; Referees: C. Bonaventura, J. Bonaventura (FRA)

29 July 2024; 16:00	Sweden	29–26	Spain	Paris Expo Porte de Versailles, Paris; Attendance: 5,764; Referees: Horáček, Novotný (CZE)
29 July 2024; 16:00	three players 5	(11–11)	Fernández 7	Paris Expo Porte de Versailles, Paris; Attendance: 5,764; Referees: Horáček, Novotný (CZE)
29 July 2024; 16:00	1× (yellow card) 4× (suspension)	Report	1× (yellow card) 5× (suspension)	Paris Expo Porte de Versailles, Paris; Attendance: 5,764; Referees: Horáček, Novotný (CZE)

31 July 2024; 14:00	Spain	37–33	Japan	Paris Expo Porte de Versailles, Paris; Attendance: 5,813; Referees: Pavićević, Ražnatović (MNE)
31 July 2024; 14:00	Odriozola 6	(20–18)	Fujisaka, Yasuhira 7	Paris Expo Porte de Versailles, Paris; Attendance: 5,813; Referees: Pavićević, Ražnatović (MNE)
31 July 2024; 14:00	1× (yellow card)	Report	1× (yellow card) 1× (suspension)	Paris Expo Porte de Versailles, Paris; Attendance: 5,813; Referees: Pavićević, Ražnatović (MNE)

2 August 2024; 16:00	Germany	33–31	Spain	Paris Expo Porte de Versailles, Paris; Attendance: 5,774; Referees: Nachevski, Nikolov (MKD)
2 August 2024; 16:00	Uščins 8	(20–18)	Gómez 10	Paris Expo Porte de Versailles, Paris; Attendance: 5,774; Referees: Nachevski, Nikolov (MKD)
2 August 2024; 16:00	5× (suspension)	Report	3× (suspension)	Paris Expo Porte de Versailles, Paris; Attendance: 5,774; Referees: Nachevski, Nikolov (MKD)

4 August 2024; 21:00	Spain	32–31	Croatia	Paris Expo Porte de Versailles, Paris; Attendance: 5,723; Referees: Horáček, Novotný (CZE)
4 August 2024; 21:00	Rodríguez 6	(20–15)	Klarica 7	Paris Expo Porte de Versailles, Paris; Attendance: 5,723; Referees: Horáček, Novotný (CZE)
4 August 2024; 21:00	2× (suspension)	Report	1× (yellow card) 6× (suspension)	Paris Expo Porte de Versailles, Paris; Attendance: 5,723; Referees: Horáček, Novotný (CZE)

Quarterfinal

7 August 2024
09:30
Spain
29–28 (ET)
Egypt
Stade Pierre-Mauroy, Lille
Attendance: 25,697
Referees: Horáček, Novotný (CZE)
Gómez 9
(8–12)
Y. El-Deraa 8
2× (suspension)
Report
5× (suspension)

FT: 25–25 ET: 4–3

Semi-final

9 August 2024; 16:30	Germany	25–24	Spain	Stade Pierre-Mauroy, Lille; Attendance: 22,745; Referees: Nachevski, Nikolov (MKD)
9 August 2024; 16:30	Uščins 6	(12–12)	Fernández 5	Stade Pierre-Mauroy, Lille; Attendance: 22,745; Referees: Nachevski, Nikolov (MKD)
9 August 2024; 16:30	1× (yellow card) 1× (suspension)	Report	1× (yellow card) 1× (suspension)	Stade Pierre-Mauroy, Lille; Attendance: 22,745; Referees: Nachevski, Nikolov (MKD)

Bronze medal game

11 August 2024; 09:00	Spain	23–22	Slovenia	Stade Pierre-Mauroy, Lille; Attendance: 17,242; Referees: Hansen, Madsen (DEN)
11 August 2024; 09:00	Gómez 5	(12–12)	Dolenec 6	Stade Pierre-Mauroy, Lille; Attendance: 17,242; Referees: Hansen, Madsen (DEN)
11 August 2024; 09:00	2× (yellow card) 2× (suspension)	Report	3× (suspension)	Stade Pierre-Mauroy, Lille; Attendance: 17,242; Referees: Hansen, Madsen (DEN)

=== Women's tournament ===
Spain women's national handball team qualified for the Olympics by securing a top two spot at the Tournament 2 of the 2024 IHF Women's Olympic Qualification Tournaments in Torrevieja, Spain.

Team roster

A 20-player squad was announced on 4 June 2024. The final roster was revealed on 11 July 2024. Carmen Campos replaced Alicia Fernández due to an injury on 24 July 2024.

Head coach: Ambros Martín

No.	Pos.	Name	Date of birth (age)	Height	App.	Goals	Club
1	GK	Nicole Wiggins	9 August 2000 (aged 23)	1.78 m	22	1	(France) OGC Nice
2	RW	Marta López	4 February 1990 (aged 34)	1.68 m	143	316	(Romania) CS Rapid București
6	CB	Carmen Campos	10 July 1995 (aged 29)	1.71 m	69	154	(Germany) Borussia Dortmund
8	CB	Silvia Arderíus	11 July 1990 (aged 34)	1.68 m	95	111	(Spain) CBF Málaga
15	RW	Maitane Etxeberria	15 January 1997 (aged 27)	1.68 m	92	166	(Spain) BM Bera Bera
16	GK	Mercedes Castellanos	21 July 1988 (aged 36)	1.84 m	98	4	(Spain) CBF Málaga
17	LW	Jennifer Gutiérrez	20 February 1995 (aged 29)	1.69 m	102	264	(Slovenia) RK Krim
22	LB	Lara González Ortega	22 February 1992 (aged 32)	1.84 m	176	183	(Romania) CS Rapid București
23	RB	Paula Arcos	21 December 2001 (aged 22)	1.72 m	56	135	(Norway) Vipers Kristiansand
24	P	Lysa Tchaptchet	20 December 2001 (aged 22)	1.83 m	48	62	(Denmark) Odense Håndbold
33	P	Kaba Gassama	16 August 1997 (aged 26)	1.84 m	68	104	(Germany) HB Ludwigsburg
34	CB	Alicia Fernández	21 December 1992 (aged 31)	1.72 m	101	227	(Romania) CS Rapid București
58	RB	María Prieto O'Mullony	3 October 1997 (aged 26)	1.72 m	25	64	(Spain) BM Aula Cultural
86	LB	Alexandrina Cabral	5 May 1986 (aged 38)	1.75 m	163	741	Unattached
99	RB	Mireya González	18 July 1991 (aged 33)	1.78 m	121	246	(Romania) HC Dunărea Brăila

Group play

Pos	Team	Pld	W	D	L	GF	GA	GD	Pts	Qualification
1	France (H)	5	5	0	0	159	124	+35	10	Quarterfinals
2	Netherlands	5	4	0	1	152	137	+15	8	Quarterfinals
3	Hungary	5	2	1	2	137	140	−3	5	Quarterfinals
4	Brazil	5	2	0	3	127	119	+8	4	Quarterfinals
5	Angola	5	1	1	3	131	154	−23	3	
6	Spain	5	0	0	5	111	143	−32	0	

Source: Olympics Paris 2024 rankings
Rules for classification: 1) Points; 2) Head-to-head points; 3) Head-to-head goal difference; 4) Head-to-head goals scored; 5) Goal difference; 6) Goals scored; 7) Draw.
(H) Hosts

25 July 2024; 14:00	Spain	18–29	Brazil	Paris Expo Porte de Versailles, Paris; Attendance: 5,765; Referees: Kurtagic, Wetterwik (SWE)
25 July 2024; 14:00	López 5	(10–15)	De Paula, Matieli 6	Paris Expo Porte de Versailles, Paris; Attendance: 5,765; Referees: Kurtagic, Wetterwik (SWE)
25 July 2024; 14:00	5× (suspension)	Report	5× (suspension)	Paris Expo Porte de Versailles, Paris; Attendance: 5,765; Referees: Kurtagic, Wetterwik (SWE)

28 July 2024; 19:00	Angola	26–21	Spain	Paris Expo Porte de Versailles, Paris; Attendance: 5,748; Referees: A. Konjičanin, D. Konjičanin (BIH)
28 July 2024; 19:00	Nenganga 7	(14–15)	Campos 6	Paris Expo Porte de Versailles, Paris; Attendance: 5,748; Referees: A. Konjičanin, D. Konjičanin (BIH)
28 July 2024; 19:00	4× (suspension) 1× (red card)	Report	3× (suspension) 1× (red card)	Paris Expo Porte de Versailles, Paris; Attendance: 5,748; Referees: A. Konjičanin, D. Konjičanin (BIH)

30 July 2024; 14:00	Netherlands	29–24	Spain	Paris Expo Porte de Versailles, Paris; Attendance: 5,834; Referees: Hansen, Madsen (DEN)
30 July 2024; 14:00	Van Wetering 5	(14–12)	Arcos 6	Paris Expo Porte de Versailles, Paris; Attendance: 5,834; Referees: Hansen, Madsen (DEN)
30 July 2024; 14:00	1× (yellow card) 1× (suspension)	Report	1× (yellow card) 2× (suspension)	Paris Expo Porte de Versailles, Paris; Attendance: 5,834; Referees: Hansen, Madsen (DEN)

1 August 2024; 14:00	Spain	24–27	Hungary	Paris Expo Porte de Versailles, Paris; Attendance: 5,816; Referees: Kuttler, Merz (GER)
1 August 2024; 14:00	Cabral 6	(12–14)	Klujber 6	Paris Expo Porte de Versailles, Paris; Attendance: 5,816; Referees: Kuttler, Merz (GER)
1 August 2024; 14:00	1× (yellow card) 2× (suspension)	Report	3× (suspension)	Paris Expo Porte de Versailles, Paris; Attendance: 5,816; Referees: Kuttler, Merz (GER)

3 August 2024; 11:00	Spain	24–32	France	Paris Expo Porte de Versailles, Paris; Attendance: 5,841; Referees: Kuttler, Merz (GER)
3 August 2024; 11:00	Cabral 5	(9–17)	Toublanc 6	Paris Expo Porte de Versailles, Paris; Attendance: 5,841; Referees: Kuttler, Merz (GER)
3 August 2024; 11:00	1× (yellow card) 4× (suspension)	Report	1× (suspension)	Paris Expo Porte de Versailles, Paris; Attendance: 5,841; Referees: Kuttler, Merz (GER)

== Judo ==
Spain qualified eight judoka (five men and three women) for each of the following weight classes at the Games by virtue of their top-18 finish in the IJF World Ranking List, while Cristina Cabaña (women's half-middleweight, 73 kg) earned a continental berth from Europe as the nation's top-ranked judoka outside of direct qualifying position. On 28 May 2024, the Royal Spanish Federation of Judo and Associated Sports (RFEJYDA) announced the full squad of nine judoka selected for the Olympic tournament.

Men

Athlete	Event	Round of 32	Round of 16	Quarterfinals	Semifinals	Repechage	Final / BM	
Athlete	Event	Opposition Result	Opposition Result	Opposition Result	Opposition Result	Opposition Result	Opposition Result	Rank
Francisco Garrigós	−60 kg	Bye	Verstraeten (BEL); W 01–00	Nagayama (JPN); W 10–00	Smetov (KAZ); L 00–10	—N/a	Sardalashvili (GEO); W 01–00	3rd place, bronze medalist(s)
David García Torné	−66 kg	Kyrgyzbayev (KAZ); L 00–01	Did not advance					17
Salvador Cases	−73 kg	Njie (GAM); W 10–00	Erdenebayar (MGL); L 00–01	Did not advance				9
Tristani Mosakhlishvili	−90 kg	Ustopiriyon (TJK); W 01–00	Sherov (KGZ); W 10–00	Macedo (BRA); W 01–00	Bekauri (GEO); L 00–10	—N/a	Tselidis (GRE); L 00–01	5
Nikoloz Sherazadishvili	−100 kg	Bye	Vég (HUN); W 10–01	Eich (SUI); L 00–01	—N/a	Wolf (JPN); W 10–00	Turoboyev (UZB); L 00–10	5

Women

Athlete	Event	Round of 32	Round of 16	Quarterfinals	Semifinals	Repechage	Final / BM	
Athlete	Event	Opposition Result	Opposition Result	Opposition Result	Opposition Result	Opposition Result	Opposition Result	Rank
Laura Martínez	−48 kg	Vargas (CHI); W 01–00	Nikolić (SRB); W 10–00	Abuzhakynova (KAZ); W 10–00	Bavuudorjiin (MGL); L 00–10	—N/a	Boukli (FRA); L 00–01	5
Ariane Toro	−52 kg	Sosorbaram (MGL); L 00–10	Did not advance					17
Cristina Cabaña	−63 kg	Quadros (BRA); L 00–10	Did not advance					17
Ai Tsunoda	−70 kg	Bye	Pogačnik (SLO); W 01–00	Matić (CRO); L 00–10	—N/a	Niizoe (JPN); W 10–00	Polleres (AUT); L 00–10	5

Mixed

Athlete	Event	Round of 32	Round of 16	Quarterfinals	Semifinals	Repechage	Final / BM	
Athlete	Event	Opposition Result	Opposition Result	Opposition Result	Opposition Result	Opposition Result	Opposition Result	Rank
Ariane Toro; Cristina Cabaña; Ai Tsunoda; David García Torné; Salvador Cases; Tristani Mosakhlishvili; Nikoloz Sherazadishvili	Team	Refugee Olympic Team; W 4–0	Japan; L 3–4	Did not advance				9

== Modern pentathlon ==
Spanish modern pentathletes confirmed a single quota place for the Games. Laura Heredia secured her selection in the women's event by winning a silver medal and finishing among the eight highest-ranked modern pentathletes eligible for qualification at the 2023 European Games in Krakow, Poland.

Athlete	Event		Fencing (épée one touch)				Swimming (200 m freestyle)			Riding (show jumping)			Combined: shooting/running (10 m laser pistol)/(3000 m)			Total points	Final rank
Athlete	Event		RR	BR	Rank	MP points	Time	Rank	MP points	Penalties	Rank	MP points	Time	Rank	MP points	Total points	Final rank
Laura Heredia	Women's	Semifinal	17–18	4	7	214	2:21.47	15	268	0	1	300	11:25.00	3	615	1397	2 Q
Laura Heredia	Women's	Final	17–18	2	10	212	2:24.14	16	262	EL	17	0	10:50.73	2	650	1124	17

== Rowing ==
Spain qualified one boat for each of the following rowing classes into the Olympic regatta, confirming Olympic places for their boats at the 2023 FISA World Championships in Belgrade, Serbia, and at the 2024 Final Qualification Regatta in Lucerne, Switzerland.

Men

Athlete	Event	Heats		Repechage		Semifinals		Final	
Athlete	Event	Time	Rank	Time	Rank	Time	Rank	Time	Rank
Rodrigo Conde; Aleix García	Double sculls	6:16.71	2 Q	—N/a		6:14.91	2 FA	6:20:59	5
Dennis Carracedo; Caetano Horta	Lightweight double sculls	6:28.92	2 Q	—N/a		6:35.05	4 FB	6:19.90	8
Jaime Canalejo; Javier García	Coxless pair	6:32.28	1 Q	—N/a		6:36.30	3 FA	6:29.60	5

Women

Athlete	Event	Heats		Repechage		Quarterfinals		Semifinals		Final	
Athlete	Event	Time	Rank	Time	Rank	Time	Rank	Time	Rank	Time	Rank
Virginia Díaz	Single sculls	7:37.30	2 QF	—N/a		7:34.01	3 SA/B	7:37.52	6 FB	7:34.61	12
Esther Briz; Aina Cid	Coxless pair	7:24.09	4 R	7:36.98	2 Q	—N/a		7:30.36	5 FB	7:07.08	7

Qualification Legend: FA=Final A (medal); FB=Final B (non-medal); FC=Final C (non-medal); FD=Final D (non-medal); FE=Final E (non-medal); FF=Final F (non-medal); SA/B=Semifinals A/B; SC/D=Semifinals C/D; SE/F=Semifinals E/F; QF=Quarterfinals; R=Repechage

== Sailing ==
Spanish sailors qualified one boat in each of the following classes through the 2023 Sailing World Championships in The Hague, in the Netherlands, and the later world and continental qualifiers. In October 2023, the Royal Spanish Sailing Federation (RFEV) confirmed the names of the first sailors selected for the Games, while the rest were later confirmed in April 2024.

Elimination events

Athlete	Event	Race																													Final rank
Athlete	Event	1	2	3	4	5	6	7	8	9	10	11	12	13	14	Total	Rank	QF	SF1	SF2	SF3	SF4	SF5	SF6	F1	F2	F3	F4	F5	F6	Final rank
Ignacio Baltasar	Men's IQFoil	15	5	13	10	17	11	~~25~~	4	8	12	~~25~~	5	3	—N/a	103	11	Did not advance													11
Pilar Lamadrid	Women's IQFoil	~~25~~	1	~~24~~	14	12	14	20	19	7	2	11	13	4	23	140	15	Did not advance													15
Gisela Pulido	Women's Formula Kite	11	11	6	~~12~~	10	10	—N/a								48	12	—N/a	Did not advance												12

Medal race events

Athlete	Event	Race													Net points	Final rank
Athlete	Event	1	2	3	4	5	6	7	8	9	10	11	12	M*	Net points	Final rank
Joaquín Blanco	Men's ILCA 7	14	35	12	20	25	10.2	~~44~~	5	—N/a				EL	121.2	21
Ana Moncada	Women's ILCA 6	30	39	1	24	29	36	~~44~~	23	9	—N/a			EL	191	29
Diego Botín; Florián Trittel	Men's 49er	~~16~~	6	4	5	11	2	3	2	2	15	12	6	1	70	1st place, gold medalist(s)
Támara Echegoyen; Paula Barceló	Women's 49erFX	~~19~~	15	14	12	4	17	13	7	4	16	11	1	EL	114	12

Mixed

Athlete	Event	Race													Net points	Final rank
Athlete	Event	1	2	3	4	5	6	7	8	9	10	11	12	M*	Net points	Final rank
Jordi Xammar; Nora Brugman	470	5	~~6~~	5	3	6	3	3	6	—N/a				9	49	4
Tara Pacheco; Andrés Barrio	Nacra 17	12	8	1	9	15	12	8	9	17	~~20~~	16	6	EL	113	11

M = Medal race; EL = Eliminated – did not advance into the medal race

== Shooting ==
Spanish shooters achieved quota places for the following events based on their results at the 2022 and 2023 ISSF World Championships, 2022, 2023, and 2024 European Championships, 2023 European Games, 2024 ISSF World Olympic Qualification Tournament and ISSF World Olympic Rankings.

Athlete	Event	Qualification		Final	
Athlete	Event	Points	Rank	Points	Rank
Alberto Fernández	Men's trap	121	14	Did not advance	
Andrés García	Men's trap	118	22	Did not advance	
Fátima Gálvez	Women's trap	122	2 Q	23	5
Mar Molné	Women's trap	123	1 Q	27	4

== Skateboarding ==
Spain skateboarders achieved quota places for the following events by virtue of their combined results at the Olympic World Skateboarding Rankings and the 2024 Olympic Qualifier Series. Daniela Terol received a reallocated quota just prior to the Games inauguration due to the withdrawal of Colombian Jazmín Álvarez due to an injury.

Men

Athlete	Event	Qualification		Final	
Athlete	Event	Points	Rank	Points	Rank
Alain Kortabitarte	Men's park	75.46	19	Did not advance	
Danny León	Men's park	56.25	20	Did not advance	

Women

Athlete	Event	Qualification		Final	
Athlete	Event	Points	Rank	Points	Rank
Julia Benedetti	Women's park	70.27	17	Did not advance	
Naia Laso	Women's park	82.49	7 Q	86.28	7
Natalia Muñoz	Women's street	214.70	14	Did not advance	
Daniela Terol	Women's street	220.38	13	Did not advance	

== Sport climbing ==
Spain qualified two climbers for the Olympic Games, as both Tokyo 2020 Olympic champion Alberto Ginés and Leslie Romero qualified thanks to their top results at the 2024 Olympic Qualifier Series.

Boulder & lead combined

Athlete	Event	Qualification						Final					
Athlete	Event	Boulder		Lead		Total	Rank	Boulder		Lead		Total	Rank
Athlete	Event	Result	Place	Result	Place	Total	Rank	Result	Place	Result	Place	Total	Rank
Alberto Ginés	Men's	28.7	14	72.0	1	100.7	4 Q	24.1	7	92.1	3	116.2	7

Speed

Athlete	Event	Seeding		Round of 16	Quarterfinals	Semifinals	Final / BM	
Athlete	Event	Time	Rank	Opposition Time	Opposition Time	Opposition Time	Opposition Time	Rank
Leslie Romero	Women's	6.89	8	Sallsabillah (INA); W 7.26–fall	Miroslaw (POL); L 7.06–6.35	Did not advance		8

== Surfing ==
Spanish surfers confirmed three shortboard quota places for Tahiti. Nadia Erostarbe, Janire González and Andy Criere qualified for the Games, thanks to their top-8 position (for women) and top-6 position (for men); among surfers not previously qualified, at the 2024 ISA World Surfing Games in Arecibo, Puerto Rico.

Athlete	Event	Round 1		Round 2	Round 3	Quarterfinal	Semifinal	Final / BM	
Athlete	Event	Score	Rank	Opposition Result	Opposition Result	Opposition Result	Opposition Result	Opposition Result	Rank
Andy Criere	Men's shortboard	12.00	3 Q2	Cleland (MEX); L 4.43–15.17	Did not advance				17
Nadia Erostarbe	Women's shortboard	18.83	1 Q3	—N/a	Matsuda (JPN); W 8.34–5.84	Weston-Webb (BRA); L 6.34–8.10	Did not advance		5
Janire González	Women's shortboard	2.43	3 Q2	Lelior (ISR); L 2.80–11.00	Did not advance				17

== Swimming ==
Spanish swimmers achieved the entry standards in the events listed below for Paris 2024 (a maximum of two swimmers under the Olympic Qualifying Time (OST) and potentially at the Olympic Consideration Time (OCT)). Additionally, they secured two quotas in the women's marathon thanks to their top-15 results at the 2024 World Aquatics Championships in Doha, Qatar. The full swimming squad was confirmed by the Royal Spanish Swimming Federation (RFEN) on 22 June 2024, with the two times Olympic swimmer Jessica Vall and Laura Cabanes both being later invited by World Aquatics due to their OCT.

Men

Athlete	Event	Heat		Semifinal		Final	
Athlete	Event	Time	Rank	Time	Rank	Time	Rank
Sergio de Celis	100 m freestyle	48.49	19	Did not advance			
Carlos Garach	800 m freestyle	7:50.07	18	Did not advance			
Carlos Garach	1500 m freestyle	15:20.84	22	—N/a		Did not advance	
Carlos Garach	10 km open water	—N/a				DNF	
Hugo González	100 m backstroke	53.68	14 Q	52.95	8 Q	52.73	6
Hugo González	200 m backstroke	1:57.08	6 Q	1:56.52	8 Q	1:55.47	6
Hugo González	200 m individual medley	DNS		Did not advance			
Mario Mollà	100 m butterfly	52.27	25	Did not advance			
Arbidel González	200 m butterfly	1:55.86	14 Q	1:56.26	16	Did not advance	
César Castro; Sergio de Celis; Luís Domínguez; Mario Mollà	4 × 100 m freestyle relay	3:13.19 NR	9	—N/a		Did not advance	
César Castro; Luís Domínguez; Carlos Garach; Ferran Julià	4 × 200 m freestyle relay	7:11.62	13	—N/a		Did not advance	
Sergio de Celis; Carles Coll; Hugo González; Mario Mollà	4 × 100 m medley relay	DSQ		—N/a		Did not advance	

Women

Athlete	Event	Heat		Semifinal		Final	
Athlete	Event	Time	Rank	Time	Rank	Time	Rank
Carmen Weiler	100 m backstroke	59.57 NR	8 Q	59.72	9	Did not advance	
Carmen Weiler	200 m backstroke	2:10.09	12 Q	2:09.99	13	Did not advance	
África Zamorano	200 m backstroke	2:10.40	15 Q	2:10.63	14	Did not advance	
Jessica Vall	100 m breaststroke	1:08.78	27	Did not advance			
Jessica Vall	200 m breaststroke	2:24.52	9 Q	2:26.22	16	Did not advance	
Laura Cabanes	100 m butterfly	59.40	25	Did not advance			
Laura Cabanes	200 m butterfly	2:10.82	16 Q	2:10.60	16	Did not advance	
Emma Carrasco	200 m individual medley	2:11.54	12 Q	2:12.25	15	Did not advance	
Emma Carrasco	400 m individual medley	4:43.13	12	Did not advance			
María de Valdés	10 km open water	—N/a				2:07:02.4	17
Ángela Martínez	10 km open water	—N/a				2:06:15.3	10
Ainhoa Campabadal; María Daza; Alba Herrero; Paula Juste	4 × 200 m freestyle relay	8:00.23	15	—N/a		Did not advance	

== Table tennis ==
Spain qualified the mixed double's pair through the 2024 ITTF World Mixed Doubles Olympics Qualification held in Havířov, Czech Republic; one men's singles quota based on continental ranking and one women's singles quota based on the final ITTF World Rankings.

Athlete	Event	Preliminary	Round 1	Round 2	Round of 16	Quarterfinals	Semifinals	Final / BM	
Athlete	Event	Opposition Result	Opposition Result	Opposition Result	Opposition Result	Opposition Result	Opposition Result	Opposition Result	Rank
Álvaro Robles	Men's singles	Bye	Habesohn (AUT); W 4–2	Calderano (BRA); L 2–4	Did not advance				
María Xiao	Women's singles	Bye	Meshref (EGY); L 1–4	Did not advance					
Álvaro Robles; María Xiao	Mixed doubles	—N/a			Ishiy / Takahashi (BRA); W 4–2	Wong / Doo (HKG); L 2–4	Did not advance		

== Taekwondo ==
Spain entered four athletes into the taekwondo competition into the Games. Three of them qualified through the direct qualification for their respective weight classes by finishing among the top five taekwondo practitioners at the end of the WT Olympic Rankings. Meanwhile, the fourth athlete, Cecilia Castro, qualified for the Games after her semifinal victory at the 2024 European Olympic Qualification Tournament in Sofia, Bulgaria.

Men

Athlete	Event	Qualification	Round of 16	Quarterfinals	Semifinals	Repechage	Final / BM	
Athlete	Event	Opposition Result	Opposition Result	Opposition Result	Opposition Result	Opposition Result	Opposition Result	Rank
Adrián Vicente	−58 kg	Bye	Yaser Ismail (PLE); W 8–3, 9–7	Magomedov (AZE); L 5–11, 11–13	—N/a	Woolley (IRL); W 10–9, 2–2	Jendoubi (TUN); L 3–11, 1–12	5
Javier Pérez	−68 kg	Bye	Tubtimdang (THA); W 7–1, 2–2	Alaphilippe (FRA); W 2–1, 4–5, 4–2	Rashitov (UZB); L 3–7, 3–3	—N/a	Pontes (BRA); L 3–3, 6–4, 3–4	5

Women

Athlete	Event	Qualification	Round of 16	Quarterfinals	Semifinals	Repechage	Final / BM	
Athlete	Event	Opposition Result	Opposition Result	Opposition Result	Opposition Result	Opposition Result	Opposition Result	Rank
Adriana Cerezo	−49 kg	Bye	Grippoli (URU); W 11–4, 7–0	Nematzadeh (IRI); L 0–2, 2–7	Did not advance			9
Cecilia Castro	−67 kg	—N/a	Shehata (EGY); L 1–0, 0–2, 1–4	Did not advance				9

== Tennis ==
Spain entered eight tennis players (six men and two women) into the Olympic tournament. Four men have guaranteed their participation as one of the top-56 eligible players in the ATP World Rankings, while two women did the same as the top-56 eligible players in the WTA World Rankings, which were completed on 10 June 2024. Additionally, Marcel Granollers secured a spot in the men's doubles event as one of the top-10 players in the doubles ranking. The team was announced on 12 June 2024, while Pablo Carreño was later replaced by Pedro Martínez and Alejandro Davidovich by Jaume Munar in the singles event.

Men

Athlete	Event	Round of 64	Round of 32	Round of 16	Quarterfinals	Semifinals	Final / BM	
Athlete	Event	Opposition Score	Opposition Score	Opposition Score	Opposition Score	Opposition Score	Opposition Score	Rank
Carlos Alcaraz	Singles	Habib (LBN); W 6–3, 6–1	Griekspoor (NED); W 6–1, 7–6^{(7–3)}	Safiullin (AIN); W 6–4, 6–2	Paul (USA); W 6–3, 7–6^{(9–7)}	Auger-Aliassime (CAN); W 6–1, 6–1	Djokovic (SRB); L 6–7^{(3–7)}, 6–7^{(2–7)}	2nd place, silver medalist(s)
Pedro Martínez	Singles	Vavassori (ITA); L 4–6, 6–4, 4–6	Did not advance					33
Jaume Munar	Singles	Zverev (GER); L 2–6, 2–6	Did not advance					33
Rafael Nadal	Singles	Fucsovics (HUN); W 6–1, 4–6, 6–4	Djokovic (SRB); L 1–6, 4–6	Did not advance				17
Carlos Alcaraz; Rafael Nadal	Doubles	—N/a	González / Molteni (ARG); W 7–6^{(7–4)}, 6–4	Griekspoor / Koolhof (NED); W 6–4, 6–7^{(2–7)}, [10–2]	Krajicek / Ram (USA); L 2–6, 4–6	Did not advance		5
Pablo Carreño; Marcel Granollers	Doubles	—N/a	Bolelli / Vavassori (ITA); W 2–6, 7–6^{(7–5)}, [10–7]	Ebden / Peers (AUS); L 2–6, 5–7	Did not advance			9

Women

Athlete	Event	Round of 64	Round of 32	Round of 16	Quarterfinals	Semifinals	Final / BM	
Athlete	Event	Opposition Score	Opposition Score	Opposition Score	Opposition Score	Opposition Score	Opposition Score	Rank
Cristina Bucșa	Singles	Martić (CRO); W 6–4, 6–3	Fernandez (CAN); L 6–7^{(4–7)}, 3–6	Did not advance				17
Sara Sorribes	Singles	Krejčíková (CZE); L 6–4, 0–6, 6–7^{(2–7)}	Did not advance					33
Cristina Bucșa; Sara Sorribes	Doubles	—N/a	Bronzetti / Cocciaretto (ITA); W 6–1, 6–2	Carlé / Podoroska (ARG); W 6–3, 6–4	L Kichenok / N Kichenok (UKR); W 6–3, 2–6, [12–10]	Andreeva / Shnaider (AIN); L 1–6, 2–6	Muchová / Nosková (CZE); W 6–2, 6–2	3rd place, bronze medalist(s)

Mixed

Athlete	Event	Round of 16	Quarterfinals	Semifinals	Final / BM	
Athlete	Event	Opposition Score	Opposition Score	Opposition Score	Opposition Score	Rank
Marcel Granollers; Sara Sorribes	Doubles	Ebden / Perez (AUS); L 3–6, 4–6	Did not advance			9

== Triathlon ==
Spain confirmed five quota places in the triathlon events for Paris, based on the final Individual Olympic Qualification Rankings completed in May 2024. The selected triathletes were announced by the Spanish Triathlon Federation (FETRI) on 6 June 2024.

Individual

Athlete	Event	Time						Rank
Athlete	Event	Swim (1.5 km)	Trans 1	Bike (40 km)	Trans 2	Run (10 km)	Total	Rank
Alberto González	Men's	20:23	0:46	52:15	0:22	30:36	1:44:22	8
Roberto Sánchez	Men's	23:02	0:51	54:28	0:23	30:45	1:49:29	36
Antonio Serrat	Men's	22:03	0:52	53:57	0:24	31:26	1:48:42	32
Miriam Casillas	Women's	26:03	0:58	59:14	0:27	35:04	2:01:46	33
Anna Godoy	Women's	23:33	0:57	58:17	0:29	34:57	1:58:13	17

Relay

Athlete	Event	Time						Rank
Athlete	Event	Swim (300 m)	Trans 1	Bike (7 km)	Trans 2	Run (2 km)	Total group	Rank
Alberto González	Mixed relay	4:03	1:06	9:44	0:23	5:02	20:18	—N/a
Anna Godoy	Mixed relay	5:02	1:05	10:30	0:26	5:39	22:42	—N/a
Antonio Serrat	Mixed relay	4:35	1:03	9:42	0:24	5:02	20:45	—N/a
Miriam Casillas	Mixed relay	5:25	1:10	10:25	0:26	6:19	23:45	—N/a
Total	Mixed relay	—N/a					1:27.30	9

== Volleyball ==
=== Beach ===
Spain qualified three pairs (two men and four women) for the Games by virtue of their corresponding top-17 placement in the FIVB Beach Volleyball Olympic Ranking completed in June 2024.

Athletes	Event	Preliminary round				Round of 16	Quarterfinal	Semifinal	Final / BM	
Athletes	Event	Opposition Score	Opposition Score	Opposition Score	Rank	Opposition Score	Opposition Score	Opposition Score	Opposition Score	Rank
Adrián Gavira; Pablo Herrera	Men's	Boermans / De Groot (NED); L (15–21, 15–21)	Krou / Gauthier-Rat (FRA); W (23–21, 21–23, 15–8)	Evans / Budinger (USA); W (21–18, 21–11)	2 Q	Bryl / Łosiak (POL); W (23–21, 21–18)	Mol / Sørum (NOR); L (16–21, 17–21)	Did not advance		5
Daniela Álvarez; Tania Moreno	Women's	Hüberli / Brunner (SUI); L (12–21, 19–21)	Placette / Richard (FRA); W (21–12, 21–15)	Ludwig / Lippmann (GER); W (21–16, 21–19)	2 Q	Stam / Schoon (NED); W (18–21, 21–19, 15–13)	Melissa / Brandie (CAN); L (18–21, 18–21)	Did not advance		5
Liliana Fernández; Paula Soria	Women's	Gottardi / Menegatti (ITA); W (24–22, 9–21, 16–14)	Ana Patricia / Duda (BRA); L (12–21, 13–21)	Abdelhady / Elghobashy (EGY); W (21–18, 21–14)	2 Q	Hüberli / Brunner (SUI); L (21–23, 16–21)	Did not advance			9

== Water polo ==
Summary

Key:
- FT – After full time.
- P – Match decided by penalty-shootout.

Team	Event	Group stage						Quarterfinal	Semifinal	Final / BM	
Team	Event	Opposition Score	Opposition Score	Opposition Score	Opposition Score	Opposition Score	Rank	Opposition Score	Opposition Score	Opposition Score	Rank
Spain men's	Men's tournament	Australia; W 9–5	Hungary; W 10–7	Serbia; W 15–11	Japan; W 23–8	France; W 10–8	1 Q	Croatia; L 8–10	Italy; W 11–9 (5°-8°)	Greece; L 13–15 (5°-6°)	6
Spain women's	Women's tournament	France; W 15–6	United States; W 13–11	Greece; W 10–8	Italy; W 13–11	—N/a	1 Q	Canada; W 18–8	Netherlands; W 5–4^{P} FT: 14–14	Australia; W 11–9	1st place, gold medalist(s)

=== Men's tournament ===
Spain men's national water polo team qualified for the Olympics by winning the 2024 European Championship in Zagreb and Dubrovnik, Croatia.

Team roster

The roster was announced on 8 July 2024.

Head coach: David Martín

- 1 Unai Aguirre GK
- 2 Alberto Munárriz D
- 3 Álvaro Granados D
- 4 Bernat Sanahuja D
- 5 Miguel de Toro CF
- 6 Marc Larumbe D
- 7 Martin Faměra CB
- 8 Sergi Cabanas CB
- 9 Roger Tahull CF
- 10 Felipe Perrone (c) D
- 11 Unai Biel D
- 12 Alejandro Bustos CB
- 13 Eduardo Lorrio GK

Group play

Pos	Team	Pld	W	PSW	PSL	L	GF	GA	GD	Pts	Qualification
1	Spain	5	5	0	0	0	67	39	+28	15	Quarterfinals
2	Australia	5	3	0	0	2	44	42	+2	9 (Note: Australia 9–8 Hungary)	Quarterfinals
3	Hungary	5	3	0	0	2	62	54	+8	9	Quarterfinals
4	Serbia	5	2	0	0	3	58	63	−5	6	Quarterfinals
5	France (H)	5	1	0	0	4	50	60	−10	3 (Note: France 14–13 Japan)	
6	Japan	5	1	0	0	4	60	83	−23	3	

Source: Olympics
Rules for classification: 1) Points; 2) Head-to-head points; 3) Head-to-head goal difference; 4) Head-to-head goals scored; 5) Goal difference.
(H) Host
Notes:

28 July 2024; 10:30 v	Report	Australia	5–9	Spain	Paris Aquatic Centre, Paris; Referees: Georgios Stavridis (GRE), Darren Spiritosanto (USA)
28 July 2024; 10:30 v	Report	Score by quarters: 1–2, 2–3, 1–3, 1–1			Paris Aquatic Centre, Paris; Referees: Georgios Stavridis (GRE), Darren Spiritosanto (USA)
28 July 2024; 10:30 v	Report	Lambie, Maksimovic 2	Goals	Munárriz 3	Paris Aquatic Centre, Paris; Referees: Georgios Stavridis (GRE), Darren Spiritosanto (USA)

30 July 2024; 21:05 v	Report	Spain	10–7	Hungary	Paris Aquatic Centre, Paris; Referees: Boris Margeta (SLO), Rafaele Colombo (ITA)
30 July 2024; 21:05 v	Report	Score by quarters: 2–1, 2–2, 4–3, 2–1			Paris Aquatic Centre, Paris; Referees: Boris Margeta (SLO), Rafaele Colombo (ITA)
30 July 2024; 21:05 v	Report	three players 2	Goals	Angyal 2	Paris Aquatic Centre, Paris; Referees: Boris Margeta (SLO), Rafaele Colombo (ITA)

1 August 2024; 12:05 v	Report	Serbia	11–15	Spain	Paris Aquatic Centre, Paris; Referees: Adrian Alexandrescu (ROU), Rafaele Colombo (ITA)
1 August 2024; 12:05 v	Report	Score by quarters: 3–4, 3–3, 3–3, 2–5			Paris Aquatic Centre, Paris; Referees: Adrian Alexandrescu (ROU), Rafaele Colombo (ITA)
1 August 2024; 12:05 v	Report	Mandić 4	Goals	Granados 4	Paris Aquatic Centre, Paris; Referees: Adrian Alexandrescu (ROU), Rafaele Colombo (ITA)

3 August 2024; 10:30 v	Report	Spain	23–8	Japan	Paris Aquatic Centre, Paris; Referees: Michiel Zwart (NED), Darren Spiritosanto (USA)
3 August 2024; 10:30 v	Report	Score by quarters: 4–0, 6–2, 7–4, 6–2			Paris Aquatic Centre, Paris; Referees: Michiel Zwart (NED), Darren Spiritosanto (USA)
3 August 2024; 10:30 v	Report	Sanahuja 5	Goals	Okawa 2	Paris Aquatic Centre, Paris; Referees: Michiel Zwart (NED), Darren Spiritosanto (USA)

5 August 2024; 20:05 v	Report	France	8–10	Spain	Paris La Défense Arena, Paris; Referees: Georgios Stavridis (GRE), Veselin Mišković (MNE)
5 August 2024; 20:05 v	Report	Score by quarters: 1–3, 2–2, 4–2, 1–3			Paris La Défense Arena, Paris; Referees: Georgios Stavridis (GRE), Veselin Mišković (MNE)
5 August 2024; 20:05 v	Report	Crousillat 3	Goals	Munárriz, Sanahuja 3	Paris La Défense Arena, Paris; Referees: Georgios Stavridis (GRE), Veselin Mišković (MNE)

Quarterfinal

7 August 2024; 14:00 v	Report	Croatia	10–8	Spain	Paris La Défense Arena, Paris; Referees: Boris Margeta (SLO), Darren Spiritosanto (USA)
7 August 2024; 14:00 v	Report	Score by quarters: 2–0, 4–3, 2–2, 2–3			Paris La Défense Arena, Paris; Referees: Boris Margeta (SLO), Darren Spiritosanto (USA)
7 August 2024; 14:00 v	Report	three players 2	Goals	three players 2	Paris La Défense Arena, Paris; Referees: Boris Margeta (SLO), Darren Spiritosanto (USA)

5–8th place classification semi-final

9 August 2024; 13:00 v	Report	Italy	9–11	Spain	Paris La Défense Arena, Paris; Referees: Michiel Zwart (NED), Sébastien Dervieux (FRA)
9 August 2024; 13:00 v	Report	Score by quarters: 0–4, 3–2, 3–3, 3–2			Paris La Défense Arena, Paris; Referees: Michiel Zwart (NED), Sébastien Dervieux (FRA)
9 August 2024; 13:00 v	Report	Echenique, Iocchi Gratta 2	Goals	Granados, Perrone 3	Paris La Défense Arena, Paris; Referees: Michiel Zwart (NED), Sébastien Dervieux (FRA)

Fifth place game

11 August 2024; 09:00 v	Report	Greece	15–13	Spain	Paris La Défense Arena, Paris; Referees: Frank Ohme (GER), Rafaele Colombo (ITA)
11 August 2024; 09:00 v	Report	Score by quarters: 2–2, 6–4, 4–1, 3–6			Paris La Défense Arena, Paris; Referees: Frank Ohme (GER), Rafaele Colombo (ITA)
11 August 2024; 09:00 v	Report	three players 3	Goals	Sanahuja 3	Paris La Défense Arena, Paris; Referees: Frank Ohme (GER), Rafaele Colombo (ITA)

=== Women's tournament ===
Spain women's national water polo team qualified for the Olympics by advancing to the final match and securing an outright berth at the 2023 World Aquatics Championships in Fukuoka, Japan.

Team roster

The roster was announced on 8 July 2024.

Head coach: Miki Oca

- 1 Laura Ester GK
- 2 Isabel Piralkova D
- 3 Anni Espar D
- 4 Beatriz Ortiz D
- 5 Nona Pérez D
- 6 Paula Crespí CB
- 7 Elena Ruiz D
- 8 Pili Peña (c) W
- 9 Judith Forca W
- 10 Paula Camus CB
- 11 Maica García Godoy CF
- 12 Paula Leitón CF
- 13 Martina Terré GK

Group play

Pos	Team	Pld	W	PSW	PSL	L	GF	GA	GD	Pts	Qualification
1	Spain	4	4	0	0	0	51	36	+15	12	Quarterfinals
2	United States	4	3	0	0	1	53	27	+26	9	Quarterfinals
3	Italy	4	1	0	0	3	34	40	−6	3 (Note: Greece 3 Pts, +3 GD; Italy 3 Pts, +3 GD; France 3 Pts, −6 GD. Italy ranked above Greece due to more goals scored.)	Quarterfinals
4	Greece	4	1	0	0	3	33	41	−8	3	Quarterfinals
5	France (H)	4	1	0	0	3	24	51	−27	3	

Source: Olympics
Rules for classification: 1) Points; 2) Head-to-head points; 3) Head-to-head goal difference; 4) Head-to-head goals scored; 5) Goal difference.
(H) Host
Notes:

27 July 2024; 18:30 v	Report	Spain	15–6	France	Paris Aquatic Centre, Paris; Referees: Hélène Painchaud (CAN), Zhang Liang (CHN)
27 July 2024; 18:30 v	Report	Score by quarters: 6–3, 3–1, 3–1, 3–1			Paris Aquatic Centre, Paris; Referees: Hélène Painchaud (CAN), Zhang Liang (CHN)
27 July 2024; 18:30 v	Report	Ruiz 4	Goals	Dhalluin 3	Paris Aquatic Centre, Paris; Referees: Hélène Painchaud (CAN), Zhang Liang (CHN)

29 July 2024; 15:35 v	Report	United States	11–13	Spain	Paris Aquatic Centre, Paris; Referees: Adrian Alexandrescu (ROU), Andrej Franulović (CRO)
29 July 2024; 15:35 v	Report	Score by quarters: 3–2, 2–4, 4–5, 2–2			Paris Aquatic Centre, Paris; Referees: Adrian Alexandrescu (ROU), Andrej Franulović (CRO)
29 July 2024; 15:35 v	Report	Raney 2	Goals	Ortiz 5	Paris Aquatic Centre, Paris; Referees: Adrian Alexandrescu (ROU), Andrej Franulović (CRO)

31 July 2024; 20:05 v	Report	Spain	10–8	Greece	Paris Aquatic Centre, Paris; Referees: Adrian Alexandrescu (ROU), Veselin Mišković (MNE)
31 July 2024; 20:05 v	Report	Score by quarters: 2–2, 3–3, 4–2, 1–1			Paris Aquatic Centre, Paris; Referees: Adrian Alexandrescu (ROU), Veselin Mišković (MNE)
31 July 2024; 20:05 v	Report	Forca 4	Goals	Eleftheriadou, Plevritou 2	Paris Aquatic Centre, Paris; Referees: Adrian Alexandrescu (ROU), Veselin Mišković (MNE)

4 August 2024; 15:35 v	Report	Italy	11–13	Spain	Paris Aquatic Centre, Paris; Referees: Andrej Franulović (CRO), Frank Ohme (GER)
4 August 2024; 15:35 v	Report	Score by quarters: 0–2, 4–3, 3–4, 4–4			Paris Aquatic Centre, Paris; Referees: Andrej Franulović (CRO), Frank Ohme (GER)
4 August 2024; 15:35 v	Report	Marletta 3	Goals	Espar 3	Paris Aquatic Centre, Paris; Referees: Andrej Franulović (CRO), Frank Ohme (GER)

Quarterfinal

6 August 2024; 14:00 v	Report	Canada	8–18	Spain	Paris La Défense Arena, Paris; Referees: Aurely Blanchard (FRA), Natalia Markopoulou (GRE)
6 August 2024; 14:00 v	Report	Score by quarters: 2–6, 2–4, 0–3, 4–5			Paris La Défense Arena, Paris; Referees: Aurely Blanchard (FRA), Natalia Markopoulou (GRE)
6 August 2024; 14:00 v	Report	Bakoc 5	Goals	Ruiz 4	Paris La Défense Arena, Paris; Referees: Aurely Blanchard (FRA), Natalia Markopoulou (GRE)

Semifinal

8 August 2024; 14:35 v	Report	Netherlands	18–19 (PSO)	Spain	Paris La Défense Arena, Paris; Referees: Boris Margeta (SLO), Alessia Ferrari (ITA)
8 August 2024; 14:35 v	Report	Score by quarters: 1–6, 4–4, 6–1, 3–3 PSO: 4–5			Paris La Défense Arena, Paris; Referees: Boris Margeta (SLO), Alessia Ferrari (ITA)
8 August 2024; 14:35 v	Report	Van de Kraats 4	Goals	Forca 5	Paris La Défense Arena, Paris; Referees: Boris Margeta (SLO), Alessia Ferrari (ITA)

Gold medal game

10 August 2024; 15:35 v	Report	Australia	9–11	Spain	Paris La Défense Arena, Paris; Referees: Nóra Debreceni (HUN), Andrej Franulović (CRO)
10 August 2024; 15:35 v	Report	Score by quarters: 2–2, 0–1, 3–4, 4–4			Paris La Défense Arena, Paris; Referees: Nóra Debreceni (HUN), Andrej Franulović (CRO)
10 August 2024; 15:35 v	Report	Williams 5	Goals	Ortiz 4	Paris La Défense Arena, Paris; Referees: Nóra Debreceni (HUN), Andrej Franulović (CRO)

== See also ==
- Spain at the 2024 Summer Paralympics
- Spain at the 2024 Winter Youth Olympics
