= Isabel Piralkova =

Spanish water polo player (born 2005)

Personal information
- Full name: Isabel Piralkova Coello
- Born: 23 June 2005 (age 21) Arenys de Mar, Spain
- Height: 173 cm (5 ft 8 in)
Medal record
Women's water polo
Representing Spain
Olympic Games
| Gold medal – first place | 2024 Paris | Team |

Isabel Piralkova Coello (Note: In this Spanish name, the first or paternal surname is Piralkova and the second or maternal family name is Coello.) (born 23 June 2005) is a Spanish water polo player. She represented Spain at the 2024 Summer Olympics.
