= Ismael García Roque =

Spanish equestrian

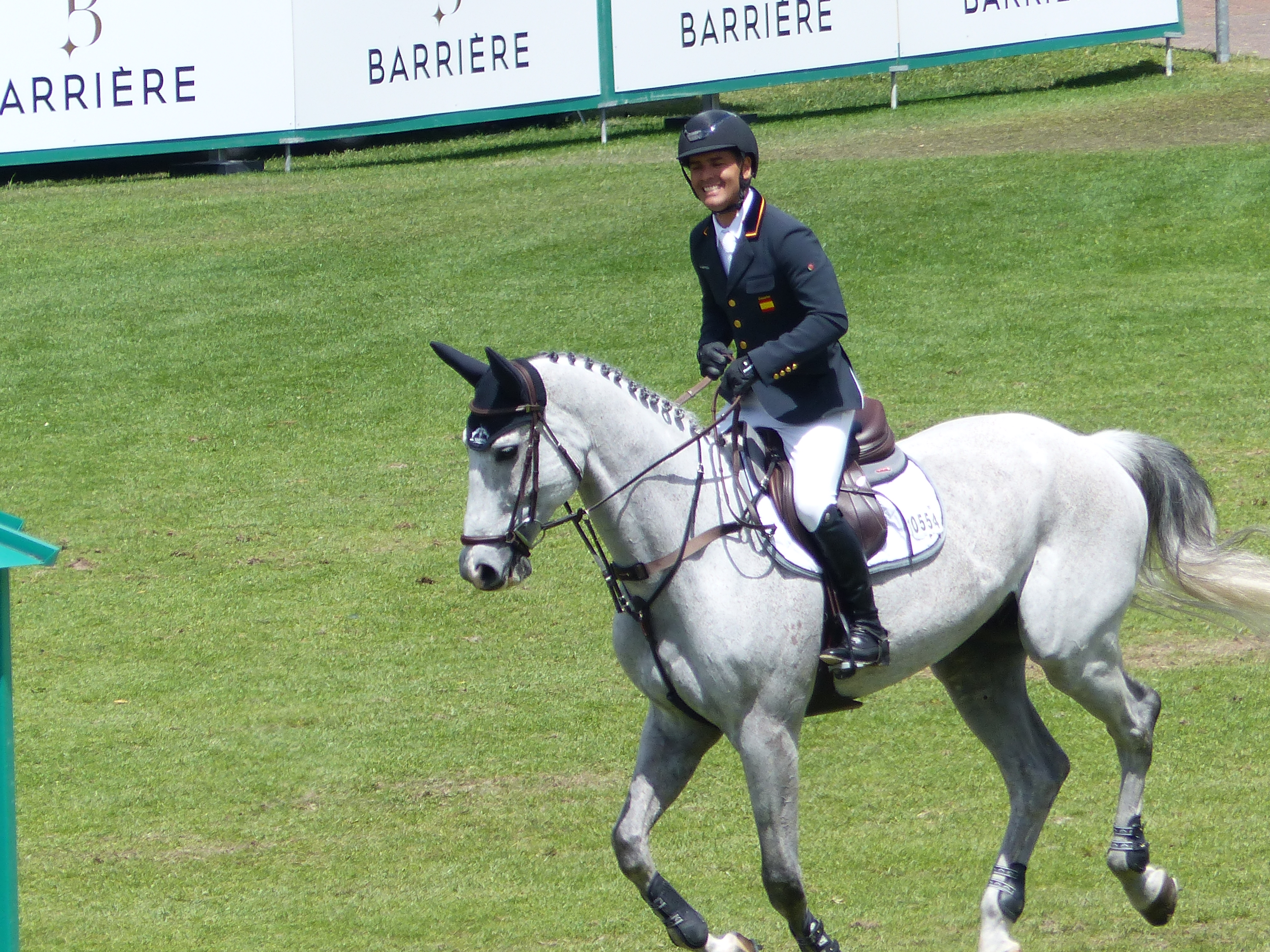
- 2024

Personal information
- Born: 4 October 1981 (age 44) Las Palmas de Gran Canaria, Spain

Sport
- Country: Spain
- Sport: Equestrian
- Event: Show jumping

Achievements and titles
- Olympic finals: 2024 Summer Olympics

Ismael García Roque (Note: In this Spanish name, the first or paternal surname is García and the second or maternal family name is Roque.) (born 4 October 1984 in Las Palmas) is a Spanish equestrian. He competed in the team jumping competition at the 2024 Summer Olympics, where he finished 11th with the Spanish team. He also represented Spain at the 2022 FEI World Championships in Herning, Denmark and at the 2021 FEI European Championships in Riesenbeck.
