= 2020 Pan American Taekwondo Olympic Qualification Tournament =

Taekwondo competition

The 2020 Pan American Taekwondo Olympic Qualification Tournament for the Tokyo Olympic Games took place in Palacio de los Deportes, Heredia, Costa Rica. The tournament was held from 11 to 12 March 2020. Each country may enter a maximum of 2 male and 2 female divisions with only one athlete in each division. The winner and runner-up athletes per division qualify for the Olympic Games under their NOC.

== Qualification summary ==
NOC	Men				Women				Total
NOC	−58kg	−68kg	−80kg	+80kg	−49kg	−57kg	−67kg	+67kg	Total
Argentina	X								1
Brazil		X	X				X		3
Chile						X			1
Colombia	X				X				2
Cuba				X					1
Dominican Republic		X	X					X	3
Haiti							X		1
Mexico				X				X	2
Puerto Rico					X				1
United States						X			1
Total: 10 NOCs	2	2	2	2	2	2	2	2	16

== Men ==
=== −58 kg ===
12 March

Round of 16
José Barahona (ESA)	1
Dylan Iturra (CHI)	28
Jefferson Ochoa (COL)	13
Jorge Martínez (NCA)	1
Jean-Maurice Young (TTO)	2
Heiner Oviedo (CRC)	27
Franco Moreno (PER)	12
Adrián Miranda (ECU)	13
Yohandri Granado (VEN)	21
Rabbin Vicente (HON)	11

Quarterfinals
Brandon Plaza (MEX)	31
Dylan Iturra (CHI)	17
Jefferson Ochoa (COL)	27
Heiner Oviedo (CRC)	7
Joan Nuñez (PUR)	6
Adrián Miranda (ECU)	12
Yohandri Granado (VEN)	0
Lucas Guzmán (ARG)	2

Semifinals
Brandon Plaza (MEX)	27
Jefferson Ochoa (COL)	32
Adrián Miranda (ECU)	0
Lucas Guzmán (ARG)	21

3rd place
Brandon Plaza (MEX)	26
Adrián Miranda (ECU)	4

=== −68 kg ===
11 March

Round of 16
Edival Pontes (BRA)	30
Carlos Giménez (PAR)	6
Brandon Sealy (JAM)	13
Federico González (URU)	16
Sohwon Kim (HAI)	11
Franco Ríos (BOL)	12
Zahyon Klaber (ARU)	6
Andrew Park (CAN)	14
Bernardo Pié (DOM)	29
César Aguilar (GUA)	6
Justin Choy (GUY)	5
Alexander Ortiz (PER)	17
Juan Soto (CRC)	15
Carlos Caicedo (ECU)	8
Derrick Pascal (CAY)	0
Ignacio Morales (CHI)	22

Quarterfinals
Edival Pontes (BRA)	22
Federico González (URU)	6
Franco Ríos (BOL)	1
Andrew Park (CAN)	14
Bernardo Pié (DOM)	22
Alexander Ortiz (PER)	14
Juan Soto (CRC)	12
Ignacio Morales (CHI)	34

Semifinals
Edival Pontes (BRA)	30
Andrew Park (CAN)	19
Bernardo Pié (DOM)	17
Ignacio Morales (CHI)	8

3rd place
Andrew Park (CAN)	23
Ignacio Morales (CHI)	28

=== −80 kg ===
12 March

Round of 16
Nathan Fradl (ARU)	13
Isiah Pollard (TTO)	15
Miguel Ferrera (HON)	33
Rossel Blanco (CAY)	9
Cristhian Santacruz (PAR)	9
Elvis Barbosa (PUR)	22
Jaysen Ishida (USA)	15
Yadier Limonta (CUB)	10
Miguel Trejos (COL)	26
Jonatan Rodríguez (URU)	5
David Robleto (NCA)	RSC
Kenroy Clarke (JAM)
Adrian Spellen (GUY)	8
Moisés Hernández (DOM)	29

Quarterfinals
Ícaro Miguel Soares (BRA)	22
Isiah Pollard (TTO)	3
Miguel Ferrera (HON)	RSC
Elvis Barbosa (PUR)
Jaysen Ishida (USA)	20
Miguel Trejos (COL)	26
David Robleto (NCA)	0
Moisés Hernández (DOM)	20

Semifinals
Ícaro Miguel Soares (BRA)	33
Miguel Ferrera (HON)	10
Miguel Trejos (COL)	7
Moisés Hernández (DOM)	13

3rd place
Miguel Ferrera (HON)	16
Miguel Trejos (COL)	43

=== +80 kg ===
11 March

Quarterfinals
Martín Sio (ARG)	11
Marc-André Bergeron (CAN)	9
Jonathan Healy (USA)	35
Marco Escobar (ESA)	3
Carlos Rivas (VEN)	7
Rafael Alba (CUB)	16

Semifinals
Carlos Sansores (MEX)	16
Martín Sio (ARG)	13
Jonathan Healy (USA)	5
Rafael Alba (CUB)	30

3rd place
Martín Sio (ARG)
Jonathan Healy (USA)	WD

== Women ==
=== −49 kg ===
12 March

Round of 16
Monica Pimentel (ARU)	11
Sofia Tournier (ARG)	9
Josipa Kafadar (CAN)	10
Solansh Vargas (NCA)	1
Dayana Muñoz (ECU)	9
Victoria Stambaugh (PUR)	15
Daniela Souza (MEX)	14
Jireh Hurtado (BOL)	7
Riccy Talbott (HON)	0
Julissa Diez Canseco (PER)	14
Yuliena Pedroza (GUA)	8
Virginia Dellán (VEN)	9

Quarterfinals
Talisca Reis (BRA)	7
Monica Pimentel (ARU)	4
Josipa Kafadar (CAN)	2
Victoria Stambaugh (PUR)	4
Daniela Souza (MEX)	5
Julissa Diez Canseco (PER)	8
Virginia Dellán (VEN)	10
Andrea Ramírez (COL)	30

Semifinals
Talisca Reis (BRA)	4
Victoria Stambaugh (PUR)	5
Julissa Diez Canseco (PER)	12
Andrea Ramírez (COL)	14

3rd place
Talisca Reis (BRA)	18
Julissa Diez Canseco (PER)	1

=== −57 kg ===
11 March

Round of 16
Rose Milove Senexant (HAI)	2
Alisson Montano (ESA)	14

Quarterfinals
Anastasija Zolotic (USA)	30
Alisson Montano (ESA)	10
Coralia Abadía (GUA)	14
Nishy Lee Lindo (CRC)	19
Fernanda Aguirre (CHI)	13
Gianella Évolo (ARG)	13
Mell Mina (ECU)	12
Carolena Carstens (PAN)	34

Semifinals
Anastasija Zolotic (USA)	25
Nishy Lee Lindo (CRC)	10
Fernanda Aguirre (CHI)	21
Carolena Carstens (PAN)	20

3rd place
Nishy Lee Lindo (CRC)	WD
Carolena Carstens (PAN)

=== −67 kg ===
12 March

Round of 16
Eliana Vásquez (PER)	16
Fabiola Escobar (ESA)	6

Quarterfinals
Milena Titoneli (BRA)	22
Eliana Vásquez (PER)	0
Arlettys Acosta (CUB)	6
Claudia Gallardo (CHI)	2
Katherine Alvarado (CRC)	7
Madelyn Rodríguez (DOM)	10
Aliyah Shipman (HAI)	14
Katherine Dumar (COL)	8

Semifinals
Milena Titoneli (BRA)	7
Arlettys Acosta (CUB)	5
Madelyn Rodríguez (DOM)	5
Aliyah Shipman (HAI)	15

3rd place
Arlettys Acosta (CUB)	9
Madelyn Rodríguez (DOM)	2

=== +67 kg ===
11 March

Quarterfinals		Semifinals		3rd place
Briseida Acosta (MEX)	9
Yamitsi Carbonell (CUB)	5	Briseida Acosta (MEX)	15
Keyla Ávila (HON)	9	Keyla Ávila (HON)	5
Carolina Fernández (VEN)	3			Keyla Ávila (HON)	0
Crystal Weekes (PUR)	18			Crystal Weekes (PUR)	17
Megan Lawrence (TTO)	3	Crystal Weekes (PUR)	3
Leonor Esteban (NCA)	0	Katherine Rodríguez (DOM)	8
Katherine Rodríguez (DOM)	7
