= Taekwondo at the 2023 Central American and Caribbean Games =

Taekwondo competition

- Venue: Centro Olímpico Juan Pablo Duarte
- Location: Santo Domingo, Dominican Republic
- Dates: 4–7 July

The taekwondo competition at the 2023 Central American and Caribbean Games is scheduled to be held from 4 to 7 July at the Centro Olímpico Juan Pablo Duarte in Santo Domingo, Dominican Republic. Taekwondo is among seven sports which will be contested in the Dominican Republic.

For the first time ever, a team kyorugui event will be held for men and women. Athletes qualified to compete at the games at a qualification tournament held in Costa Rica in February 2023.

== Medal table ==
* Host nation (El Salvador)

Rank	Nation	Gold	Silver	Bronze	Total
1	Colombia (COL)	3	6	1	10
2	Mexico (MEX)	3	2	2	7
3	Costa Rica (CRC)	3	1	2	6
4	Cuba (CUB)	2	1	4	7
5	Dominican Republic (DOM)	1	2	4	7
6	Centro Caribe Sports (CCS)	1	0	1	2
7	Nicaragua (NCA)	1	0	0	1
8	Puerto Rico (PUR)	0	1	3	4
9	Haiti (HAI)	0	1	1	2
10	Venezuela (VEN)	0	0	4	4
11	Panama (PAN)	0	0	3	3
12	Aruba (ARU)	0	0	1	1
12	El Salvador (ESA)*	0	0	1	1
12	Jamaica (JAM)	0	0	1	1
Totals (14 entries)		14	14	28	56

== Medal summary ==
=== Men's events ===
Event	Gold	Silver	Bronze
-58 kg	Brandon Plaza (MEX)	Jefferson Ochoa (COL)	Yohandri Granado (VEN) David Fuentes (CCS)
-68 kg	Bernardo Pie (DOM)	David Paz (COL)	Adrian Benitez (PUR) Iker Casas (MEX)
-80 kg	Miguel Trejos (COL)	Alejandro Flores (CRC)	Moisés Hernández (DOM) Bradon Sealy (JAM)
+80 kg	Rafael Alba (CUB)	Carlos Sansores (MEX)	Luis Alvarez (VEN) Luis Soto (COL)
Team Kyorugui	Mexico (MEX); Carlos Navarro; Jose Nava; Jose Pastor; Iker Casas	Colombia (COL); Damian Gil; Jhon Garrido; Juan Valencia; David Paz	Cuba (CUB); Kelvin Calderon; Guillermo Perez; Luis Cortina; Akely Matos Dominican Republic (DOM); Maickol Orozco; Wander Gonzalez; Luisito Pie; Moisés Hernández
Individual Poomsae	Elian Ortega (NCA)	Isaac Velez (COL)	Juan Calderon (CRC) Miguel Ramos (PUR)

=== Women's events ===
Event	Gold	Silver	Bronze
-49 kg	Andrea Ramírez (COL)	Daniela Souza (MEX)	Karoline Castillo (PAN) Virginia Dellan (VEN)
-57 kg	Nishy Lindo (CRC)	Andrialis Bonilla (DOM)	Tamara Robles (CUB) Carolena Carstens (PAN)
-67 kg	Arlettys Acosta (CUB)	Ava Soon Lee (HAI)	Naishka Roman (PUR) Leslie Soltero (MEX)
+67 kg	Gloria Mosquera (COL)	Crystal Weekes (PUR)	Aliyah Shipman (HAI) Katherine Rodríguez (DOM)
Team Kyorugui	Mexico (MEX); Jazmin Chavez; Itzel Velazquez; Victoria Heredia; Fabiola Villegas	Dominican Republic (DOM); Nahomy Víctor; Vanessa Corporan; Mayerlin Mejía; Madelyn Rodríguez	Costa Rica (CRC); Avril Blanco; Marcela Diaz; Angelique Ramirez; Nishy Lindo Cuba (CUB); Zalaris Cortez; Elianet Crespo; Marlyn Pérez; Tamara Robles
Individual Poomsae	Maria Salas (CRC)	Karen Suache (COL)	Jenniffer Baez (ARU) Daniela Rodriguez (PAN)

=== Mixed events ===
Event	Gold	Silver	Bronze
Pairs Poomsae Recognized	Costa Rica (CRC); Juan Calderon; Maria Salas	Colombia (COL); Karen Suache; Isaac Velez	Cuba (CUB); Tania Delgado; Dario Navarro Dominican Republic (DOM); Joel Vilorio; Ana Peña
Pairs Poomsae Freestyle	Centro Caribe Sports (CCS); Maria Higueros; Hector Morales	Cuba (CUB); Tania Delgado; Dario Navarro	El Salvador (ESA); Monica Campos; Elias Ruiz Venezuela (VEN); Bryan Gonzalez; Fernanda Melillo

== See also ==
- Taekwondo at the 2023 Pan American Games
