= Colombia at the 2020 Summer Olympics =

- IOC code: COL
- NOC: Colombian Olympic Committee
- Website: www.olimpicocol.co (in Spanish)

in Tokyo, Japan July 23, 2021 – August 8, 2021
- Competitors: 70 in 18 sports
- Flag bearers (opening): Caterine Ibargüen; Yuberjen Martínez
- Flag bearer (closing): Ingrit Valencia
- Medals Ranked 66th: Gold 0 Silver 4 Bronze 1 Total 5

Summer Olympics appearances (overview)
- 1932; 1936; 1948; 1952; 1956; 1960; 1964; 1968; 1972; 1976; 1980; 1984; 1988; 1992; 1996; 2000; 2004; 2008; 2012; 2016; 2020; 2024

Colombia competed at the 2020 Summer Olympics in Tokyo. Originally scheduled to take place from 24 July to 9 August 2020, the Games were postponed to 23 July to 8 August 2021, because of the COVID-19 pandemic. It was the nation's twentieth appearance at the Summer Olympics, with the exception of Helsinki 1952. For the first time since Beijing 2008, the nation has been failed to win a single Olympic gold medal.

== Medalists ==
Medal	Name	Sport	Event	Date
Silver	Luis Javier Mosquera	Weightlifting	Men's 67 kg	25 July
Silver	Mariana Pajón	Cycling	Women's BMX racing	30 July
Silver	Anthony Zambrano	Athletics	Men's 400 metres	5 August
Silver	Sandra Arenas	Athletics	Women's 20 kilometres walk	6 August
Bronze	Carlos Ramírez	Cycling	Men's BMX racing	30 July

Medals by sport
Sport	1st place, gold medalist(s)	2nd place, silver medalist(s)	3rd place, bronze medalist(s)	Total
Athletics	0	2	0	2
Cycling	0	1	1	2
Weightlifting	0	1	0	1
Total	0	4	1	5

Medals by gender
Gender	1st place, gold medalist(s)	2nd place, silver medalist(s)	3rd place, bronze medalist(s)	Total	Percentage
Female	0	2	0	2	40%
Male	0	2	1	3	60%
Mixed	0	0	0	0	0%
Total	0	4	1	5	100%

== Competitors ==
The following is the list of number of competitors participating in the Games:

Sport	Men	Women	Total
Archery	1	1	2
Artistic swimming	—	2	2
Athletics	17	9	26
Boxing	4	2	6
Cycling	7	2	9
Diving	3	0	3
Equestrian	1	0	1
Fencing	0	1	1
Golf	1	1	2
Gymnastics	1	0	1
Judo	0	1	1
Shooting	1	0	1
Skateboarding	1	0	1
Swimming	1	1	2
Taekwondo	1	1	2
Tennis	3	1	4
Weightlifting	2	1	3
Wrestling	3	0	3
Total	47	23	70

== Archery ==
One Colombian archer secured an Olympic place in the women's individual recurve by advancing to the semifinal match, as the highest-ranked athlete not already qualified, at the 2019 Pan American Games in Lima, Peru. Another Colombian archer scored a gold-medal triumph to book one of three available spots in the men's individual recurve at the 2021 Pan American Qualification Tournament in Monterrey, Mexico.

Athlete	Event	Ranking round		Round of 64	Round of 32	Round of 16	Quarterfinals	Semifinals	Final / BM	
Athlete	Event	Score	Seed	Opposition Score	Opposition Score	Opposition Score	Opposition Score	Opposition Score	Opposition Score	Rank
Daniel Pineda	Men's individual	639	58	Wei Sx (CHN); L 0–6	Did not advance					
Valentina Acosta	Women's individual	627	50	Bettles (GBR); L 4–6	Did not advance					
Daniel Pineda; Valentina Acosta	Mixed team	1266	26	—N/a		Did not advance				

== Artistic swimming ==
Colombia fielded a squad of two artistic swimmers to compete in the women's duet event, by finishing ninth and securing the last of the eight available spots at the 2021 FINA Olympic Qualification Tournament in Barcelona, Spain.

Athlete	Event	Technical routine		Free routine (preliminary)			Free routine (final)		
Athlete	Event	Points	Rank	Points	Total (technical + free)	Rank	Points	Total (technical + free)	Rank
Estefanía Álvarez; Mónica Arango	Duet	82.0526	18	81.9667	164.0193	18	Did not advance		

== Athletics ==
Colombian athletes further achieved the entry standards, either by qualifying time or by world ranking, in the following track and field events (up to a maximum of 3 athletes in each event):

Key

- Note–Ranks given for track events are within the athlete's heat only
- Q = Qualified for the next round
- q = Qualified for the next round as a fastest loser or, in field events, by position without achieving the qualifying target
- NR = National record
- N/A = Round not applicable for the event
- Bye = Athlete not required to compete in round

Track & road events
Men

Athlete	Event	Heat		Semifinal		Final	
Athlete	Event	Result	Rank	Result	Rank	Result	Rank
Bernardo Baloyes	200 m	DNS		Did not advance			
Jhon Perlaza	400 m	46.55	6	Did not advance			
Anthony Zambrano	400 m	44.87	1 Q	43.93 AR	2 Q	44.08	2nd place, silver medalist(s)
Carlos San Martín	3000 m steeplechase	8:33.47	12	—N/a		Did not advance	
Carlos Lemos; Diego Palomeque; Raúl Mena; Jhon Perlaza; Jhon Solís; Anthony Zambrano	4 × 400 m relay	3:03.20	8	—N/a		Did not advance	
Iván Darío González	Marathon	—N/a				DNF	-
Jeison Suárez	Marathon	—N/a				2:13:29	15
Éider Arévalo	20 km walk	—N/a				1:24:10	18
Jhon Castañeda	20 km walk	—N/a				1:26:41	27
Manuel Esteban Soto	20 km walk	—N/a				1:23:32	14
José Leonardo Montaña	50 km walk	—N/a				3:53:50	11
Diego Pinzón	50 km walk	—N/a				3:57:54	18
Jorge Armando Ruiz	50 km walk	—N/a				3:55:30	13

Women

Athlete	Event	Heat		Semifinal		Final	
Athlete	Event	Result	Rank	Result	Rank	Result	Rank
Melissa Gonzalez	400 m hurdles	55.32 NR	2 Q	57.47	6	Did not advance	
Angie Orjuela	Marathon	—N/a				2:40:04	55
Sandra Arenas	20 km walk	—N/a				1:29:37	2nd place, silver medalist(s)
Yeseida Carrillo	20 km walk	—N/a				DNF	
Sandra Galvis	20 km walk	—N/a				1:35:36	25

Field events

Athlete	Event	Qualification		Final	
Athlete	Event	Distance	Position	Distance	Position
Mauricio Ortega	Men's discus throw	64.49	6 q	64.08	7
Caterine Ibargüen	Women's triple jump	14.37	7 q	14.25	10
Yosiris Urrutia	Women's triple jump	13.16	27	Did not advance	
María Lucelly Murillo	Women's javelin throw	54.98	27	Did not advance	

Combined events – Women's heptathlon

Athlete	Event	100H	HJ	SP	200 m	LJ	JT	800 m	Final	Rank
Evelis Aguilar	Result	13.89	1.68	13.42	24.05	6.29	44.85	2:10.45	6214 SB	14
Evelis Aguilar	Points	994	830	755	976	940	761	958	6214 SB	14

== Boxing ==
Colombia entered six boxers (four men and two women) to compete in each of the following weight classes into the Olympic tournament. With the cancellation of the 2021 Pan American Qualification Tournament in Buenos Aires, Rio 2016 Olympians Ceiber Ávila (men's featherweight), Jorge Vivas (men's light heavyweight), and medalists Yuberjen Martínez (men's flyweight) and Ingrit Valencia (women's flyweight), along with two rookies (Salcedo and Arias), finished among the top five of their respective weight divisions to secure their places on the Colombian squad based on the IOC's Boxing Task Force Rankings for the Americas.

Athlete	Event	Round of 32	Round of 16	Quarterfinals	Semifinals	Final	
Athlete	Event	Opposition Result	Opposition Result	Opposition Result	Opposition Result	Opposition Result	Rank
Yuberjen Martínez	Men's flyweight	Mahommed (BOT); W 0–5	Panghal (IND); W 1–4	Tanaka (JPN); L 1–4	Did not advance		
Ceiber Ávila	Men's featherweight	Al-Wadi (JOR); W 0–5	Mulenga (ZAM); W 3–2	Takyi (GHA); L 2–3	Did not advance		
Jorge Vivas	Men's light heavyweight	Whittaker (GBR); L 1–4	Did not advance				
Cristian Salcedo	Men's super heavyweight	Bye	Peró (CUB); L 0–5	Did not advance			
Ingrit Valencia	Women's flyweight	Bye	Kom (IND); W 3–2	Namiki (JPN); L 0–5	Did not advance		
Yeni Arias	Women's featherweight	Bye	Petrova (BUL); W 3–2	Petecio (PHI); L 0–5	Did not advance		

== Cycling ==
=== Road ===
Colombia entered a squad of six riders (five men and one woman) to compete in their respective Olympic road races, by virtue of their top 50 national finish (for men) and her top 100 individual finish (for women) in the UCI World Ranking.

Athlete	Event	Time	Rank
Esteban Chaves	Men's road race	6:15:38	45
Sergio Higuita	Men's road race	6:21:46	81
Nairo Quintana	Men's road race	6:21:46	69
Rigoberto Urán	Men's road race	6:06:33	8
Rigoberto Urán	Men's time trial	57:18.69	8
Paula Patiño	Women's road race	3:55:15	22

=== Track ===
Following the completion of the 2020 UCI Track Cycling World Championships, Colombia entered one rider to compete in the men's sprint and keirin based on his final individual UCI Olympic rankings.

Sprint

Athlete	Event	Qualification		Round 1	Repechage 1	Round 2	Repechage 2	Round 3	Repechage 3	Quarterfinals	Semifinals	Final	
Athlete	Event	Time Speed (km/h)	Rank	Opposition Time Speed (km/h)	Opposition Time Speed (km/h)	Opposition Time Speed (km/h)	Opposition Time Speed (km/h)	Opposition Time Speed (km/h)	Opposition Time Speed (km/h)	Opposition Time Speed (km/h)	Opposition Time Speed (km/h)	Opposition Time Speed (km/h)	Rank
Kevin Quintero	Men's sprint	9.626; 74.797	16	Wakimoto (JPN); L	Awang (MAS); Mitchell (NZL); L	Did not advance							

Keirin

Athlete	Event	Round 1	Repechage	Quarterfinals	Semifinals	Final
Athlete	Event	Rank	Rank	Rank	Rank	Rank
Kevin Quintero	Men's keirin	3 R	2 Q	1 Q	6 FB	11

=== BMX ===
Colombian riders qualified for three quota places (two men and one woman) in the BMX at the Olympics, as a result of the nation's fifth-place finish for men and sixth for women in the UCI BMX Olympic Qualification Ranking List of 1 June 2021.

Athlete	Event	Quarterfinal		Semifinal		Final	
Athlete	Event	Points	Rank	Points	Rank	Result	Rank
Vincent Pelluard	Men's race	14	4 Q	17	6	Did not advance	10
Carlos Ramírez	Men's race	11	3 Q	10	2 Q	40.572	3rd place, bronze medalist(s)
Mariana Pajón	Women's race	3	1 Q	8	2 Q	44.448	2nd place, silver medalist(s)

== Diving ==
Colombia entered three divers into the Olympic competition by virtue of a top twelve finish in the men's springboard at the 2019 FINA World Championships and by winning the gold medal in the same event at the 2019 Pan American Games in Lima, Peru.

Athlete	Event	Preliminary		Semifinal		Final	
Athlete	Event	Points	Rank	Points	Rank	Points	Rank
Sebastián Morales	Men's 3 m springboard	400.85	15 Q	324.95	18	Did not advance	
Daniel Restrepo	Men's 3 m springboard	411.50	14 Q	329.30	17	Did not advance	
Sebastian Villa	Men's 10 m platform	407.30	10 Q	341.40	18	Did not advance	

== Equestrian ==
Colombia entered one equestrian rider into the Olympic competition by finishing among the top ten and securing the second of four available slots in the individual jumping at the 2019 Pan American Games in Lima, Peru.

=== Jumping ===
Athlete	Horse	Event	Qualification		Final		
Athlete	Horse	Event	Penalties	Rank	Penalties	Time	Rank
Roberto Terán	Dez' Ooktoff	Individual	9	=47	Did not advance		

== Fencing ==
Colombia entered one fencer into the Olympic competition. Set to compete at her third consecutive Games, Saskia Loretta van Erven Garcia claimed a spot in the women's foil as the top-ranked fencer vying for qualification from the Americas in the FIE Adjusted Official Rankings.

Athlete	Event	Round of 64	Round of 32	Round of 16	Quarterfinal	Semifinal	Final / BM	
Athlete	Event	Opposition Score	Opposition Score	Opposition Score	Opposition Score	Opposition Score	Opposition Score	Rank
Saskia Loretta van Erven Garcia	Women's foil	Bye	Zagidullina (ROC); L 8–15	Did not advance				

== Golf ==
Colombia entered two golfers (one per gender) into the Olympic tournament. Sebastián Muñoz (world no. 67) and Rio 2016 Olympian Mariajo Uribe (world no. 306) qualified directly among the top 60 eligible players for their respective events based on the IGF World Rankings.

Athlete	Event	Round 1	Round 2	Round 3	Round 4	Total		
Athlete	Event	Score	Score	Score	Score	Score	Par	Rank
Sebastián Muñoz	Men's	67	69	66	67	269	−15	=4
Mariajo Uribe	Women's	73	77	70	70	290	+6	=49

== Gymnastics ==
=== Trampoline ===
Colombia qualified one gymnast for the men's trampoline by winning the gold medal at the 2021 Pan American Championships in Rio de Janeiro.

Athlete	Event	Qualification		Final	
Athlete	Event	Score	Rank	Score	Rank
Ángel Hernández	Men's	105.930	9	Did not advance	

== Judo ==
Colombia qualified one judoka for the women's middleweight category (70 kg) at the Games. Set to compete at her fourth straight Games, London 2012 bronze medalist Yuri Alvear accepted a continental berth from the Americas as the nation's top-ranked judoka outside of direct qualifying position in the IJF World Ranking List of June 28, 2021. She was forced to withdraw due to an injury.

Athlete	Event	Round of 32	Round of 16	Quarterfinals	Semifinals	Repechage	Final / BM	
Athlete	Event	Opposition Result	Opposition Result	Opposition Result	Opposition Result	Opposition Result	Opposition Result	Rank
Luz Álvarez	Women's –48 kg	Rishony (ISR); L 00–10	Did not advance					

== Shooting ==
Colombia granted an invitation from ISSF to send Bernardo Tobar Prado in the men's rapid fire pistol to the Olympics, as long as the minimum qualifying score (MQS) was fulfilled by June 6, 2021.

Athlete	Event	Qualification		Final	
Athlete	Event	Points	Rank	Points	Rank
Bernardo Tobar Prado	Men's 25 m rapid fire pistol	546	26	Did not advance	

== Skateboarding ==
Colombia entered one skateboarder into the Olympic tournament. Jhancarlos González was automatically selected among the top 16 eligible skateboarders in the men's street based on the World Skate Olympic Rankings of June 30, 2021.

Athlete	Event	Qualification		Final	
Athlete	Event	Result	Rank	Result	Rank
Jhancarlos González	Men's street	23.57	15	Did not advance	

== Swimming ==
Colombia received a universality invitation from FINA to send two top-ranked swimmers (one per gender) in their respective individual events to the Olympics, based on the FINA Points System of June 28, 2021.

Athlete	Event	Heat		Semifinal		Final	
Athlete	Event	Time	Rank	Time	Rank	Time	Rank
Jorge Murillo	Men's 100 m breaststroke	1:00.62	31	Did not advance			
Jorge Murillo	Men's 200 m breaststroke	2:13.46	30	Did not advance			
Isabella Arcila	Women's 50 m freestyle	25.41	27	Did not advance			
Isabella Arcila	Women's 100 m backstroke	1:02.28	32	Did not advance			

== Taekwondo ==
Colombia entered two athletes into the taekwondo competition at the Games. Jefferson Ochoa (men's 58 kg) and 2019 Pan American Games bronze medalist Andrea Ramirez (women's 49 kg), secured the spots on the Colombian squad with a top two finish each in their respective weight classes at the 2020 Pan American Qualification Tournament in San José, Costa Rica.

Athlete	Event	Qualification	Round of 16	Quarterfinals	Semifinals	Repechage	Final / BM	
Athlete	Event	Opposition Result	Opposition Result	Opposition Result	Opposition Result	Opposition Result	Opposition Result	Rank
Jefferson Ochoa	Men's −58 kg	—N/a	Hadipour (IRI); L 22–19	Did not advance				
Andrea Ramírez	Women's −49 kg	Bye	Tomić (CRO); W 25–5	Yıldırım (TUR); L 30–31	Did not advance			

== Tennis ==
Colombia entered four tennis players into the Olympic tournament. Juan Sebastián Cabal and Robert Farah qualified directly for the men's doubles by virtue of their combined top 10 placement in the ATP World Rankings of 14 June 2021. Following the consequent withdrawals of several tennis players, Daniel Elahi Galán (world no. 111) and Camila Osorio (world no. 94) filled the available slots allocated by the original entrants in their respective singles events based on the ATP and WTA World Rankings of June 14, 2021.

Athlete	Event	Round of 64	Round of 32	Round of 16	Quarterfinals	Semifinals	Final / BM	
Athlete	Event	Opposition Score	Opposition Score	Opposition Score	Opposition Score	Opposition Score	Opposition Score	Rank
Daniel Elahi Galán	Men's singles	Safwat (EGY); W 7–5, 6–1	Zverev (GER); L 6–2, 6–2	Did not advance				
Juan Sebastián Cabal; Robert Farah	Men's doubles	—N/a	Carreño / Davidovich (ESP); W 6–2, 6–4	Marach / Oswald (AUT); W 6–4, 6–1	Daniell / Venus (NZL); L 3–6, 6–3, [7–10]	Did not advance		
Camila Osorio	Women's singles	Golubic (SUI); L 4–6, 1–6	Did not advance					

== Weightlifting ==
Colombia entered three weightlifters (two men and one woman) into the Olympic competition. Rio 2016 bronze medalist Luis Javier Mosquera (men's 67 kg) and rookie Brayan Rodallegas (men's 81 kg), with Mercedes Pérez (women's 64 kg) going to her third straight Games on the women's side, secured one of the top eight slots each in their respective weight divisions based on the IWF Absolute World Ranking.

Athlete	Event	Snatch		Clean & Jerk		Total	Rank
Athlete	Event	Result	Rank	Result	Rank	Total	Rank
Luis Javier Mosquera	Men's −67 kg	151 AM	1	180	2	331 AM	2nd place, silver medalist(s)
Brayan Rodallegas	Men's −81 kg	163	4	196	5	359	5
Mercedes Pérez	Women's –64 kg	101	6	126	5	227	4

== Wrestling ==
Colombia qualified three wrestlers for each of the following classes into the Olympic competition. One of them finished among the top six to book Olympic spots in the men's freestyle 86 kg at the 2019 World Championships, while two more licenses were awarded to Colombian wrestlers, who progressed to the top two finals of the men's freestyle 57 kg and men's Greco-Roman 67 kg, respectively, at the 2020 Pan American Qualification Tournament in Ottawa, Canada.

Key:

- VT (ranking points: 5–0 or 0–5) – Victory by fall.
- VB (ranking points: 5–0 or 0–5) – Victory by injury (VF for forfeit, VA for withdrawal or disqualification)
- PP (ranking points: 3–1 or 1–3) – Decision by points – the loser with technical points.
- PO (ranking points: 3–0 or 0–3) – Decision by points – the loser without technical points.
- ST (ranking points: 4–0 or 0–4) – Great superiority – the loser without technical points and a margin of victory of at least 8 (Greco-Roman) or 10 (freestyle) points.
- SP (ranking points: 4–1 or 1–4) – Technical superiority – the loser with technical points and a margin of victory of at least 8 (Greco-Roman) or 10 (freestyle) points.

Freestyle

Athlete	Event	Round of 16	Quarterfinal	Semifinal	Repechage	Final / BM	
Athlete	Event	Opposition Result	Opposition Result	Opposition Result	Opposition Result	Opposition Result	Rank
Óscar Tigreros	Men's −57 kg	Kumar (IND); L 1–4 ^{ST}	Did not advance		Vangelov (BUL); L 0–5 ^{VT}	Did not advance	10
Carlos Izquierdo	Men's −86 kg	Amine (SMR); L 1–4 ^{SP}	Did not advance				12

Greco-Roman

Athlete	Event	Round of 16	Quarterfinal	Semifinal	Repechage	Final / BM	
Athlete	Event	Opposition Result	Opposition Result	Opposition Result	Opposition Result	Opposition Result	Rank
Julián Horta	Men's −67 kg	Reza (IRI); L 0–4 ^{ST}	Did not advance		Stäbler (GER); L 0–4 ^{ST}	Did not advance	17

== See also ==
- Colombia at the 2019 Pan American Games
- Colombia at the 2020 Winter Youth Olympics
