= Taekwondo at the 2018 Central American and Caribbean Games =

Taekwondo competition

- Venue: Coliseo Colegio Marymount
- Location: (Colombia) Barranquilla
- Dates: 20–23 July

The taekwondo competition at the 2018 Central American and Caribbean Games was held in Barranquilla, Colombia from 20 to 23 July at the Coliseo Colegio Marymount.

== Medal summary ==
=== Men's events ===
Event	Gold	Silver	Bronze
-54 kg	César Rodríguez (MEX)	Edward Espinosa (DOM)	Nelson Acajabón (GUA); Heiner Oviedo (CRC)
-58 kg	Brandon Plaza (MEX)	Luisito Pié (DOM)	Oscar Pearson (CRC); Jefferson Ochoa (COL)
-63 kg	Bernardo Pié (DOM)	Juan Soto (CRC)	Iker Casas (MEX); Miguel Aguiar (CUB)
-68 kg	José Nava (MEX)	Andrés Zelaya (GUA)	Edgar Contreras (VEN); Ruddy Mateo (DOM)
-74 kg	José Cobas (CUB)	René Lizárraga (MEX)	Neyder Lozano (COL); Yorfren Benavides (VEN)
-80 kg	Moisés Hernández (DOM)	Uriel Adriano (MEX)	Erlandi Mustelier (CUB); Elvis Barbosa (PUR)
-87 kg	Rafael Alba (CUB)	Brian Ruidíaz (PUR)	Bryan Salazar (MEX); Alan Rodríguez (ESA)
+87 kg	Robelis Despaigne (CUB)	Carlos Sansores (MEX)	Fraily Mora (DOM); Juan Álvarez (PUR)
Individual Poomsae	Isaac Vélez (COL)	Vaslav Ayala (MEX)	Elián Ortega (NCA); Ignacio Madrigal (CRC)
Team Poomsae	Colombia (COL); Isaac Vélez; Juan Bustamante; Luis Álvarez	Guatemala (GUA); Dany Coy Chen; José Ixtacuy; José Najera	Mexico (MEX); Vaslav Ayala; Leonardo Juárez; Marco Arroyo Nicaragua (NCA); Jerry Mansell; Beeyker Quintero; Elián Ortega

=== Women's events ===
Event	Gold	Silver	Bronze
-46 kg	Andrea Ramírez (COL)	Brenda Costa (MEX)	Virginia Dellan (VEN); Alexandra Degross (PUR)
-49 kg	Daniela Souza (MEX)	Elizabeth Zamora (GUA)	Victoria Stambaugh (PUR); Ibeth Rodríguez (COL)
-53 kg	Tamara Robles (CUB)	Carolena Carstens (PAN)	Linda Torres (MEX); Laura García (COL)
-57 kg	Paulina Armeria (MEX)	Adriana Martínez (VEN)	Coralia Abadia (GUA); Katherine Toro (COL)
-62 kg	Glienys Castillo (CUB)	Anel Félix (MEX)	Alexmar Sulbaran (VEN); Madelyn Rodríguez (DOM)
-67 kg	Arlettys Acosta (CUB)	Katherine Alvardo (CRC)	Deysy Montes de Oca (DOM); Victoria Heredia (MEX)
-73 kg	Crystal Weekes (PUR)	Glenhis Hernández (CUB)	Carolina Fernández (VEN); Sandra Vanegas (COL)
+73 kg	Katherine Rodríguez (DOM)	Briseida Acosta (MEX)	Gloria Mosquera (COL); Keyla Ávila (HON)
Individual Poomsae	Daniela Rodríguez (MEX)	María Guillén (CRC)	Arelis Medina (PUR); Karen Suache (COL)
Team Poomsae	Mexico (MEX); Daniela Rodríguez; Paula Fregoso; Ana Ibáñez	Colombia (COL); Karen Suache; Valeria Bravo; Estefanía Palacio	El Salvador (ESA); Celia Argueta; Mónica Campos; Laura Vázquez Puerto Rico (PUR); Ana Figueroa; Arelis Medina; Fabiola Ruiz

=== Mixed events ===
Event	Gold	Silver	Bronze
Pairs Poomsae	Mexico (MEX); Daniela Rodríguez; Vaslav Ayala	Colombia (COL); Isaac Vélez; Karen Suache	Costa Rica (CRC); María Guillén; Ignacio Madrigal Puerto Rico (PUR); Arelis Medina; José Torres

== Medal table ==
* Host nation (Colombia)

Rank	Nation	Gold	Silver	Bronze	Total
1	Mexico (MEX)	8	7	5	20
2	Cuba (CUB)	6	1	2	9
3	Colombia (COL)*	3	2	8	13
4	Dominican Republic (DOM)	3	2	4	9
5	Puerto Rico (PUR)	1	1	7	9
6	Costa Rica (CRC)	0	3	4	7
7	Guatemala (GUA)	0	3	2	5
8	Venezuela (VEN)	0	1	5	6
9	Panama (PAN)	0	1	0	1
10	El Salvador (ESA)	0	0	2	2
10	Nicaragua (NCA)	0	0	2	2
12	Honduras (HON)	0	0	1	1
Totals (12 entries)		21	21	42	84
