= Taekwondo at the 2023 Pan American Games – Women's Kyorugi team =

Women's kyorugi team at the 2023 Pan American Games
- Venue: Contact Sports Center
- Date: October 24, 2023
- Competitors: 26 from 12 nations

Medalists
Gold medal	Dominican Republic
Silver medal	Mexico
Bronze medal	Brazil
Bronze medal	Cuba

The women's kyorugi team competition of the taekwondo events at the 2023 Pan American Games in Santiago, Chile, was held on October 24 at the Contact Sports Center.

== Rosters ==
12 NOCs competed in teams composed of three athletes each.

Team	Athletes		
Argentina	Giulia Sendra	Carla Godoy	Victoria Rivas
Brazil	Sandy Macedo	Caroline Santos	Gabriele Siqueira
Canada	Skylar Park	Angelique Orozco	Ashley Kraayeveld
Chile	Claudia Gallardo	Javiera López	Deisy Guelet
Colombia	Laura Ramírez	Andrea Ramírez	Gloria Mosquera
Cuba	Arlettys Acosta	Frislaidis Martínez	Marlyn Pérez
Dominican Republic	Katherine Rodríguez	Madelyn Rodríguez	Mayerlin Mejia
Ecuador	Mell Mina	Dayana Folleco	Carla Tito
Mexico	Victoria Heredia	Fabiola Villegas	Leslie Soltero
Peru	Eliana Vasquez	Camila Caceres	Alessandra Suarez
Puerto Rico	Naishka Roman	Crystal Weekes	Victoria Stambaugh
United States	Caitlyn Cox	Kristina Teachout	Madelynn Gorman-Shore
Venezuela	Alexmar Sulbaran	Virginia Dellan	Carolina Fernandez

== Results ==
=== Bracket ===
Round of 16
Puerto Rico	66
Venezuela	72
Brazil	32
Ecuador	24
Peru	1
Canada	0
Colombia	32
Argentina	24

Quarterfinals
Mexico	82
Venezuela	37
Brazil	57
Chile	16
Cuba	72
Peru	30
Colombia	66
Dominican Republic	63

Semifinals
Mexico	61
Brazil	60
Cuba	31
Dominican Republic	33

Gold medal match
Mexico	44
Dominican Republic	54
