= Taekwondo at the 2019 Pan American Games =

- Taekwondo pictogram
- Venue: Polideportivo Callao
- Dates: July 27–29, 2019
- No. of events: 12 (5 men, 5 women, 2 mixed)
- Competitors: 140 from 26 nations

Taekwondo competitions at the 2019 Pan American Games in Lima, Peru were held between July 26 to 29, 2019 at the Polideportivo Villa El Salvador, which also hosted the volleyball competitions.

12 medal events were contested. Eight of these events were in Kyorugi (four per gender). This edition marked the premiere of the pomsae events. These events were added after the request of the Organizing Committee as it understood that the chances of medal at this sport were very low for the host country. A total of 140 athletes were scheduled to compete.

== Medal table ==
* Host nation (Peru)

Rank	Nation	Gold	Silver	Bronze	Total
1	United States	4	1	4	9
2	Mexico	4	1	2	7
3	Brazil	2	2	3	7
4	Colombia	1	1	2	4
5	Argentina	1	0	0	1
6	Canada	0	3	2	5
7	Peru*	0	2	1	3
8	Cuba	0	1	2	3
9	Dominican Republic	0	1	1	2
10	Chile	0	0	2	2
11	Costa Rica	0	0	1	1
11	Ecuador	0	0	1	1
11	Puerto Rico	0	0	1	1
Totals (13 entries)		12	12	22	46

== Medalists ==
=== Kyorugi ===
Men

Event	Gold	Silver	Bronze
58 kg	Lucas Guzmán; Argentina	Brandon Plaza; Mexico	David Kim; United States
58 kg	Lucas Guzmán; Argentina	Brandon Plaza; Mexico	Paulo Ricardo Melo; Brazil
68 kg	Edival Pontes; Brazil	Bernardo Pié; Dominican Republic	Hervan Nkogho; Canada
68 kg	Edival Pontes; Brazil	Bernardo Pié; Dominican Republic	Ignacio Morales; Chile
80 kg	Miguel Trejos; Colombia	Ícaro Miguel Soares; Brazil	José Cobas; Cuba
80 kg	Miguel Trejos; Colombia	Ícaro Miguel Soares; Brazil	Moisés Hernández; Dominican Republic
+80 kg	Jonathan Healy; United States	Rafael Alba; Cuba	Carlos Sansores; Mexico
+80 kg	Jonathan Healy; United States	Rafael Alba; Cuba	Maicon Andrade; Brazil

Women

Event	Gold	Silver	Bronze
49 kg	Daniela Souza; Mexico	Talisca Reis; Brazil	Monique Rodriguez; United States
49 kg	Daniela Souza; Mexico	Talisca Reis; Brazil	Andrea Ramírez; Colombia
57 kg	Anastasija Zolotic; United States	Skylar Park; Canada	Nishy Lee Lindo; Costa Rica
57 kg	Anastasija Zolotic; United States	Skylar Park; Canada	Fernanda Aguirre; Chile
67 kg	Milena Titoneli; Brazil	Paige McPherson; United States	Katherine Dumar; Colombia
67 kg	Milena Titoneli; Brazil	Paige McPherson; United States	Arlettys Acosta; Cuba
+67 kg	Briseida Acosta; Mexico	Gloria Mosquera; Colombia	Madelynn Gorman-Shore; United States
+67 kg	Briseida Acosta; Mexico	Gloria Mosquera; Colombia	Raiany Fidelis; Brazil

=== Poomsae ===
Event	Gold	Silver	Bronze
Men's individual	Alex Lee; United States	Hugo del Castillo; Peru	Marco Arroyo; Mexico
Men's individual	Alex Lee; United States	Hugo del Castillo; Peru	Abbas Assadian Jr; Canada
Women's individual	Paula Fregoso; Mexico	Marcella Castillo; Peru	Karyn Real; United States
Women's individual	Paula Fregoso; Mexico	Marcella Castillo; Peru	Claudia Cárdenas; Ecuador
Mixed pairs	Mexico; Leonardo Juárez; Ana Ibáñez	Canada; Jinsu Ha; Michelle Lee	Peru; Renzo Saux; Ariana Vera
Freestyle teams	United States; Ethan Sun; Sae-Jin Yi; Kayrn Real; Andrew Lee; Alex Lee	Canada; Mark Bush; AJ Assadian; Jinsu Ha; Valerie Ho; Michelle Lee	Puerto Rico; Miguel Rivera; Luis Colón; Bryan Ribera; Fabiola Ruiz; Arelis Medina

== Participating nations ==
A total of 26 countries qualified athletes. The number of athletes a nation entered is in parentheses beside the name of the country.

- Argentina (5)
- Aruba (1)
- Barbados (1)
- Brazil (8)
- Canada (13)
- Chile (5)
- Colombia (8)
- Costa Rica (4)
- Cuba (7)
- Dominican Republic (7)
- Ecuador (7)
- Guatemala (6)
- Guyana (1)
- Haiti (1)
- Honduras (3)
- Jamaica (1)
- Mexico (13)
- Nicaragua (2)
- Panama (1)
- Peru (13)
- Puerto Rico (10)
- Suriname (1)
- Trinidad and Tobago (1)
- United States (13)
- Uruguay (1)
- Venezuela (7)

== Qualification ==
A total of 140 taekwondo athletes will qualify to compete. Each nation may enter a maximum of 13 athletes (eight in Kyorugi and five in Poomsae). The host nation, Peru, automatically qualifies the maximum number of athletes (13) and is entered in each event. There will also nine wild card spots awarded in Kyorugi. The spots were awarded at the qualification tournament held in Santo Domingo in March 2019.

== See also ==
- Taekwondo at the 2020 Summer Olympics
