= 2019 World Taekwondo Championships – Women's flyweight =

Women's flyweight at the 2019 World Championships
- Venue: Manchester Arena
- Dates: 17–18 May 2019
- Competitors: 49 from 49 nations

Medalists
gold medal	Panipak Wongpattanakit	Thailand
silver medal	Wu Jingyu	China
bronze medal	Rukiye Yıldırım	Turkey
bronze medal	Kristina Tomić	Croatia

The women's flyweight is a competition featured at the 2019 World Taekwondo Championships, and was held at the Manchester Arena in Manchester, United Kingdom on 17 and 18 May. Flyweights were limited to a maximum of 49 kilograms in body mass.

== Results ==
Legend

- W — Won by withdrawal

=== Finals ===
Semifinals		Final
Panipak Wongpattanakit (THA)	25
Rukiye Yıldırım (TUR)	14	Panipak Wongpattanakit (THA)	21
Wu Jingyu (CHN)	30	Wu Jingyu (CHN)	6
Kristina Tomić (CRO)	12

=== Top half ===
==== Section 1 ====
Round of 64
Jessica Canabal (PHI)	5
Martina Corelli (ITA)	19
Madinabonu Mannopova (UZB)	23
Aqila Aulia Ramadani (INA)	3
Yunisha Rai (NEP)	7
Nahid Kiani (IRI)	34
Rabab Ouhadi (MAR)	13
Apostolia Tsantoukla (GRE)	7
Tania García (ESP)	20
Amnah Chehade (SWE)	0

Round of 32
Panipak Wongpattanakit (THA)	22
Martina Corelli (ITA)	2
Madinabonu Mannopova (UZB)	4
Nahid Kiani (IRI)	6
Miyu Yamada (JPN)	18
Rabab Ouhadi (MAR)	11
Tania García (ESP)	15
Camila Rodríguez (COL)	5

Round of 16
Panipak Wongpattanakit (THA)	28
Nahid Kiani (IRI)	7
Miyu Yamada (JPN)	28
Tania García (ESP)	35

Quarterfinals
Panipak Wongpattanakit (THA)	17
Tania García (ESP)	6

==== Section 2 ====
Round of 64
María José Calderón (CRC)	34
Yuliena Pedroza (GUA)	54
Ela Aydin (GER)	23
María Belén Bucheli (ECU)	3
Alexandra Lecorps (HAI)	2
Julissa Diez Canseco (PER)	27
Lam Siu Wai (HKG)	8
Kayla Morales (USA)	7

Round of 32
Rukiye Yıldırım (TUR)	25
Yuliena Pedroza (GUA)	5
Ela Aydin (GER)	17
Natalia Antipenko (RUS)	12
Victoria Stambaugh (PUR)	9
Julissa Diez Canseco (PER)	6
Lam Siu Wai (HKG)	5
Maddison Moore (GBR)	28

Round of 16
Rukiye Yıldırım (TUR)	23
Ela Aydin (GER)	18
Victoria Stambaugh (PUR)	1
Maddison Moore (GBR)	4^{W}

Quarterfinals
Rukiye Yıldırım (TUR)	47
Maddison Moore (GBR)	9

=== Bottom half ===
==== Section 3 ====
Round of 64
Jhuang Tien-yu (TPE)	17
Daiana Vázquez (ARG)	2
Josipa Kafadar (CAN)	15
Katerina Andreou (CYP)	0
Ana Coelho (POR)	7
Bouma Coulibaly (CIV)	28
Anna El-Haddad (LBN)
Avishag Semberg (ISR)	W

Round of 32
Vanja Stanković (SRB)	6
Jhuang Tien-yu (TPE)	8
Josipa Kafadar (CAN)	5
Wu Jingyu (CHN)	17
Daniela Souza (MEX)	42
Bouma Coulibaly (CIV)	22
Avishag Semberg (ISR)	8
Talisca Reis (BRA)	7

Round of 16
Jhuang Tien-yu (TPE)	6
Wu Jingyu (CHN)	20
Daniela Souza (MEX)	12
Avishag Semberg (ISR)	10

Quarterfinals
Wu Jingyu (CHN)	25
Daniela Souza (MEX)	8

==== Section 4 ====
Round of 64
Oleksandra Danshina (UKR)	24
Yania Aguirre (CUB)	18
Ikram Dhahri (TUN)	23
Shantelle Mendoza (DEN)	3
Park Hye-jin (KOR)	25
Tamzin Christoffel (AUS)	5
Sarah Adidou (FRA)	17
Nikol Chorbanova (BUL)	4

Round of 32
Nour Abdelsalam (EGY)	16
Oleksandra Danshina (UKR)	15
Ikram Dhahri (TUN)	9
Dominika Hronová (CZE)	7
Patimat Abakarova (AZE)	30
Park Hye-jin (KOR)	17
Sarah Adidou (FRA)	6
Kristina Tomić (CRO)	28

Round of 16
Nour Abdelsalam (EGY)	2
Ikram Dhahri (TUN)	3
Patimat Abakarova (AZE)	3
Kristina Tomić (CRO)	12

Quarterfinals
Ikram Dhahri (TUN)	10
Kristina Tomić (CRO)	14
