= 2021 Pan American Taekwondo Championships =

21st edition of Pan American Taekwondo Championships in Mexico in June 2021

- Venue: Hotel Barceló Riviera Maya
- Location: Cancún, Mexico
- Dates: 3–4 June

The 2021 Pan American Taekwondo Championships, the 21st edition of the Pan American Taekwondo Championships, was held in Cancún, Mexico from 3 to 4 June 2021.

== Medal summary ==
=== Men ===
Event	Gold	Silver	Bronze
−54 kg	Melvy Álvarez; United States	César Rodríguez; Mexico	Paulo Melo; Brazil
−54 kg	Melvy Álvarez; United States	César Rodríguez; Mexico	Victor Santos; Brazil
−58 kg	Brandon Plaza; Mexico	Jefferson Ochoa; Colombia	David Kim; United States
−58 kg	Brandon Plaza; Mexico	Jefferson Ochoa; Colombia	Jorge Ramos; Chile
−63 kg	Carlos Navarro; Mexico	Alejandro Chang; United States	Victor Souza; Brazil
−63 kg	Carlos Navarro; Mexico	Alejandro Chang; United States	Cristián Olivero; Chile
−68 kg	David Paz; Colombia	Iker Casas; Mexico	Ignacio Morales; Chile
−68 kg	David Paz; Colombia	Iker Casas; Mexico	Hervan Nkogho; Canada
−74 kg	René Lizárraga; Mexico	Luis Colon; Puerto Rico	Rubén Nava; Mexico
−74 kg	René Lizárraga; Mexico	Luis Colon; Puerto Rico	Joaquín Churchill; Chile
−80 kg	Carl Nickolas; United States	Miguel Trejos; Colombia	Moisés Hernandez; Dominican Republic
−80 kg	Carl Nickolas; United States	Miguel Trejos; Colombia	Lucas Ostapiv; Brazil
−87 kg	Ícaro Miguel Soares; Brazil	Bryan Salazar; Mexico	Dallas Parker; United States
−87 kg	Ícaro Miguel Soares; Brazil	Bryan Salazar; Mexico	Jordan Stewart; Canada
+87 kg	Rafael Alba; Cuba	Jonathan Healy; United States	Robson Maia; Brazil
+87 kg	Rafael Alba; Cuba	Jonathan Healy; United States	Carlos Sansores; Mexico

=== Women ===
Event	Gold	Silver	Bronze
−46 kg	Andrea Ramírez; Colombia	Brenda Costa Rica; Mexico	Laura Sancho; Costa Rica
−46 kg	Andrea Ramírez; Colombia	Brenda Costa Rica; Mexico	Yvette Hui Hua Yong; Canada
−49 kg	Daniela Souza; Mexico	Camila Rodríguez; Colombia	Nivea Barros; Brazil
−49 kg	Daniela Souza; Mexico	Camila Rodríguez; Colombia	Daniela González; Guatemala
−53 kg	Makayla Greenwood; United States	Leonor Dias; Brazil	Renata Garcia; Mexico
−53 kg	Makayla Greenwood; United States	Leonor Dias; Brazil	Yuliena Pedroz; Guatemala
−57 kg	Skylar Park; Canada	Sandy Macedo; Brazil	Fernanda Aguirre; Chile
−57 kg	Skylar Park; Canada	Sandy Macedo; Brazil	Faith Dillon; United States
−62 kg	Caroline Santos; Brazil	Anastasija Zolotic; United States	Ashley Kraayeveld; Canada
−62 kg	Caroline Santos; Brazil	Anastasija Zolotic; United States	Anel Félix; Mexico
−67 kg	Milena Titoneli; Brazil	Victoria Heredia; Mexico	Leslie Soltero; Mexico
−67 kg	Milena Titoneli; Brazil	Victoria Heredia; Mexico	Melissa Pagnotta; Canada
−73 kg	Madelynn Gorman-Shore; United States	María Espinoza; Mexico	Raiany Fidelis; Brazil
−73 kg	Madelynn Gorman-Shore; United States	María Espinoza; Mexico	Raphaella Galacho; Brazil
+73 kg	Gabriele Siqueira; Brazil	Briseida Acosta; Mexico	Gloria Mosquera; Colombia
+73 kg	Gabriele Siqueira; Brazil	Briseida Acosta; Mexico	Katherine Rodríguez; Dominican Republic

== Medal table ==
* Host nation (Mexico)

Rank	Nation	Gold	Silver	Bronze	Total
1	Mexico (MEX)*	4	7	5	16
2	United States (USA)	4	3	3	10
3	Brazil (BRA)	4	2	8	14
4	Colombia (COL)	2	3	1	6
5	Canada (CAN)	1	0	5	6
6	Cuba (CUB)	1	0	0	1
7	Puerto Rico (PUR)	0	1	0	1
8	Chile (CHI)	0	0	5	5
9	Dominican Republic (DOM)	0	0	2	2
9	Guatemala (GUA)	0	0	2	2
11	Costa Rica (CRC)	0	0	1	1
Totals (11 entries)		16	16	32	64
