= Taekwondo at the 2020 Summer Olympics – Women's 49 kg =

Taekwondo competition

Women's 49kg Taekwondo at the Games of the XXXII Olympiad
- Venue: Makuhari Messe
- Date: 24 July 2021
- Competitors: 17 from 17 nations

Medalists
1st place, gold medalist(s)		Panipak Wongpattanakit	Thailand
2nd place, silver medalist(s)		Adriana Cerezo	Spain
3rd place, bronze medalist(s)		Avishag Semberg	Israel
3rd place, bronze medalist(s)		Tijana Bogdanović	Serbia

The women's 49 kg competition in Taekwondo at the 2020 Summer Olympics was held on 24 July 2021 at the Makuhari Messe Hall A.

== Results ==
=== Finals ===
Gold medal match
1 Panipak Wongpattanakit (THA)	11
15 Adriana Cerezo (ESP)	10

=== Repechage ===
Repechage
16 Avishag Semberg (ISR)	22
8 Trương Thị Kim Tuyền (VIE)	1

Bronze medal match
3 Rukiye Yıldırım (TUR)	22
16 Avishag Semberg (ISR)	27

Repechage
2 Tijana Bogdanović (SRB)	12
7 Wu Jingyu (CHN)	9

Bronze medal match
4 Miyu Yamada (JPN)	6
2 Tijana Bogdanović (SRB)	20

=== Pool A ===
Qualification round
16 Avishag Semberg (ISR)	22
17 Victoria Stambaugh (PUR)	2

Round of 16
13 Su Po-ya (TPE)	9
4 Miyu Yamada (JPN)	10
5 Sim Jae-young (KOR)	19
12 Oumaima El-Bouchti (MAR)	10
9 Yvette Yong (CAN)	5
8 Trương Thị Kim Tuyền (VIE)	19
1 Panipak Wongpattanakit (THA)	29
16 Avishag Semberg (ISR)	5

Quarter-finals
4 Miyu Yamada (JPN)	16
5 Sim Jae-young (KOR)	7
8 Trương Thị Kim Tuyền (VIE)	11
1 Panipak Wongpattanakit (THA)	20

Semi-finals
4 Miyu Yamada (JPN)	12
1 Panipak Wongpattanakit (THA)	34

=== Pool B ===
Qualification round

Round of 16
15 Adriana Cerezo (ESP)	12
2 Tijana Bogdanović (SRB)	4
7 Wu Jingyu (CHN)	24
10 Dina Pouryounes (EOR)	3
11 Andrea Ramírez (COL)	25
6 Kristina Tomić (CRO)	5
3 Rukiye Yıldırım (TUR)	21
14 Nour Abdelsalam (EGY)	20

Quarter-finals
15 Adriana Cerezo (ESP)	33
7 Wu Jingyu (CHN)	2
11 Andrea Ramírez (COL)	30
3 Rukiye Yıldırım (TUR)	31

Semi-finals
15 Adriana Cerezo (ESP)	39
3 Rukiye Yıldırım (TUR)	19
