= Taekwondo at the 2026 Central American and Caribbean Games =

- Venue: Centro Olímpico Juan Pablo Duarte
- Location: Santo Domingo, Dominican Republic
- Dates: 25–28 July

The taekwondo competition at the 2026 Central American and Caribbean Games was held in Santo Domingo, Dominican Republic, from 25 to 28 July 2026 at the Centro Olímpico Juan Pablo Duarte.

== Participating nations ==
A total of 20 nations qualified athletes. The number of athletes a nation entered is in parentheses beside the name of the country.

- Aruba (1)
- Barbados (1)
- Colombia (16)
- Costa Rica (10)
- Cuba (14)
- Dominican Republic (22)
- El Salvador (6)
- Guatemala (6)
- Guyana (1)
- Haiti (4)
- Honduras (8)
- Jamaica (2)
- Mexico (22)
- Nicaragua (6)
- Panama (3)
- Puerto Rico (15)
- Suriname (2)
- Trinidad and Tobago (1)
- Venezuela (16)
- Virgin Islands (1)

== Medal table ==
* Host nation (Dominican Republic)

Rank	Nation	Gold	Silver	Bronze	Total
1	Mexico (MEX)	7	5	4	16
2	Cuba (CUB)	3	4	4	11
3	Venezuela (VEN)	3	1	3	7
4	Dominican Republic (DOM)*	2	2	5	9
5	Costa Rica (CRC)	2	1	2	5
6	Colombia (COL)	1	4	6	11
7	Guatemala (GUA)	1	1	2	4
8	Haiti (HAI)	1	0	1	2
9	Puerto Rico (PUR)	0	1	9	10
10	Honduras (HON)	0	1	1	2
11	Guyana (GUY)	0	0	1	1
11	Nicaragua (NCA)	0	0	1	1
11	Panama (PAN)	0	0	1	1
Totals (13 entries)		20	20	40	80

== Medal summary ==
=== Poomsae ===
Event	Gold	Silver	Bronze
Men's traditional	William Arroyo; Mexico	Víctor Cantillano; Costa Rica	Luis Colón; Puerto Rico
Men's traditional	William Arroyo; Mexico	Víctor Cantillano; Costa Rica	César Aguilar; Guatemala
Women's traditional	María Higueros; Guatemala	Seo Lee; Mexico	Arelis Medina; Puerto Rico
Women's traditional	María Higueros; Guatemala	Seo Lee; Mexico	Tania Delgado; Cuba
Mixed freestyle	Mexico; William Arroyo; Seo Lee	Guatemala; César Aguilar; María Higueros	Puerto Rico; Arelis Medina; Luis Colón
Mixed freestyle	Mexico; William Arroyo; Seo Lee	Guatemala; César Aguilar; María Higueros	Cuba; Tania Delgado; Dany Valenciano

=== Men's kyorugi ===
Event	Gold	Silver	Bronze
−54 kg	Wilfrido de la Cruz; Dominican Republic	Derek Midence; Honduras	Juan Grimaldo; Venezuela
−54 kg	Wilfrido de la Cruz; Dominican Republic	Derek Midence; Honduras	Sebastián Echavarri; Mexico
−58 kg	Zaid Pérez; Mexico	Jhoel Díaz; Venezuela	Cristofer Reyes; Dominican Republic
−58 kg	Zaid Pérez; Mexico	Jhoel Díaz; Venezuela	Ilay Rodríguez; Puerto Rico
−63 kg	Yohandri Granado; Venezuela	David Millán; Mexico	Aido Blanco; Nicaragua
−63 kg	Yohandri Granado; Venezuela	David Millán; Mexico	Edgardo Nazario; Puerto Rico
−68 kg	Jeshuath Pedraza; Venezuela	Jhon Garrido; Colombia	Ángel Fernández; Cuba
−68 kg	Jeshuath Pedraza; Venezuela	Jhon Garrido; Colombia	Ian Romero; Panama
−74 kg	Bernardo Pié; Dominican Republic	Adrián Benítez; Puerto Rico	Damián Gil; Colombia
−74 kg	Bernardo Pié; Dominican Republic	Adrián Benítez; Puerto Rico	José Nava; Mexico
−80 kg	Iker Casas; Mexico	Miguel Trejos; Colombia	Kelvin Calderón; Cuba
−80 kg	Iker Casas; Mexico	Miguel Trejos; Colombia	Pedro Martínez; Dominican Republic
−87 kg	Luis Álvarez; Venezuela	Esquivel Bocio; Dominican Republic	Wilmer Bernárdez; Honduras
−87 kg	Luis Álvarez; Venezuela	Esquivel Bocio; Dominican Republic	Luis Soto; Colombia
+87 kg	Carlos Sansores; Mexico	Yoikel Goicochea; Cuba	Moisés Hernández; Dominican Republic
+87 kg	Carlos Sansores; Mexico	Yoikel Goicochea; Cuba	Julián Webb; Costa Rica

=== Women's kyorugi ===
Event	Gold	Silver	Bronze
−46 kg	Jaycee Bassett; Costa Rica	Fernanda Hernández; Mexico	Danna Ramírez; Colombia
−46 kg	Jaycee Bassett; Costa Rica	Fernanda Hernández; Mexico	Alannis Alers; Puerto Rico
−49 kg	Daniela Souza; Mexico	Andrea Ramírez; Colombia	Ceili Peterson; Guyana
−49 kg	Daniela Souza; Mexico	Andrea Ramírez; Colombia	Nicolle Way; Guatemala
−53 kg	Nadia Ferreira; Mexico	Marlyn Pérez; Cuba	Laura Sancho; Costa Rica
−53 kg	Nadia Ferreira; Mexico	Marlyn Pérez; Cuba	Nahomy Víctor; Dominican Republic
−57 kg	Nishy Lindo; Costa Rica	Tamara Robles; Cuba	Fabiola Villegas; Mexico
−57 kg	Nishy Lindo; Costa Rica	Tamara Robles; Cuba	Andrea Delgado; Puerto Rico
−62 kg	Jessica Lee; Haiti	Karla Rodríguez; Mexico	Laura Malagón; Colombia
−62 kg	Jessica Lee; Haiti	Karla Rodríguez; Mexico	Isuangelis Soto; Puerto Rico
−67 kg	Anaisel León; Cuba	Leslie Soltero; Mexico	Laura Ramírez; Colombia
−67 kg	Anaisel León; Cuba	Leslie Soltero; Mexico	Hillary Clemente; Venezuela
−73 kg	Arlettys Acosta; Cuba	Kiara Paz; Colombia	Ava Lee; Haiti
−73 kg	Arlettys Acosta; Cuba	Kiara Paz; Colombia	Madelyn Rodríguez; Dominican Republic
+73 kg	Gloria Mosquera; Colombia	Elianet Crespo; Cuba	Sarai González; Mexico
+73 kg	Gloria Mosquera; Colombia	Elianet Crespo; Cuba	Naishka Román; Puerto Rico

=== Mixed kyorugi ===
Event	Gold	Silver	Bronze
Team	Cuba; Haila Ribalta; Kevin González; María Sosa; Yunier Noa	Dominican Republic; Jesús Fabián; Lorena Rodríguez; María Peña; Saúl Taveras	Colombia; David Paz; Marco Blanco; Angelyn Saldaña; Karen Méndez
Team	Cuba; Haila Ribalta; Kevin González; María Sosa; Yunier Noa	Dominican Republic; Jesús Fabián; Lorena Rodríguez; María Peña; Saúl Taveras	Venezuela; Naholy Bastidas; Iván Hernández; Nailys Ascanio; Moisés Sosa
