= 2024 European Taekwondo Championships – Women's 46 kg =

Women's 46 kg at the 2024 European Taekwondo Championships
- Venue: Belgrade Fair – Hall 1
- Location: Belgrade, Serbia
- Dates: 11 May
- Competitors: 20 from 20 nations

Medalists
gold medal	Lena Stojković	Croatia
silver medal	Džejla Makaš	Bosnia and Herzegovina
bronze medal	Viktoriia Nahurna	Ukraine
bronze medal	Phoenix Goodman	Great Britain

The women's 46 kg competition at the 2024 European Taekwondo Championships was held on 11 May 2024.

== Results ==
=== Finals ===
Semifinals
Lena Stojković (CRO)	2
Viktoriia Nahurna (UKR)	0
Phoenix Goodman (GBR)	1
Džejla Makaš (BIH)	2

Final
Lena Stojković (CRO)	2
Džejla Makaš (BIH)	1

=== Top half ===
==== Section 1 ====
Round of 32
Michalina Wróbel (POL)	1
Zemfira Hasanzade (AZE)	2

Round of 16
Lena Stojković (CRO)	2
Zemfira Hasanzade (AZE)	0
Ida-Elina Tammila (FIN)	0
Kyriaki Kouttouki (CYP)	2

Quarterfinals
Lena Stojković (CRO)	2
Kyriaki Kouttouki (CYP)	0

==== Section 2 ====
Round of 32
Hanna Csáki (HUN)	1
Mihaela Bajan (ROU)	2

Round of 16
Dina Pouryounes (RTA)	1
Viktoriia Nahurna (UKR)	2
Mihaela Bajan (ROU)	1
Nika Kolarek (SRB)	2

Quarterfinals
Viktoriia Nahurna (UKR)	2
Nika Kolarek (SRB)	0

=== Bottom half ===
==== Section 3 ====
Round of 32
Felizia Ivanov (SWE)	0
Milana Bekulova (AIN)	2

Round of 16
Emine Göğebakan (TUR)	0
Milana Bekulova (AIN)	2
Sofía García (ESP)	1
Phoenix Goodman (GBR)	2

Quarterfinals
Milana Bekulova (AIN)	1
Phoenix Goodman (GBR)	2

==== Section 4 ====
Round of 32
Melina Georgiou (GRE)
Patrícia Salgueiro (POR)

Round of 16
Sofia Zampetti (ITA)	1
Džejla Makaš (BIH)	2
Melina Georgiou (GRE)	2
Rivka Bayech (ISR)	1

Quarterfinals
Džejla Makaš (BIH)	2
Melina Georgiou (GRE)	0
