= Daniela Souza =

Mexican taekwondo practitioner

Personal information
- Full name: Daniela Paola Souza Naranjo
- Born: 27 August 1999 (age 26) Zapopan, Mexico

Sport
- Country: Mexico
- Sport: Taekwondo
- Event: -49 kg
- Team: MEX
Medal record
Representing Mexico
World Championships
Gold medal – first place	2022 Guadalajara	49 kg
Grand Prix
Bronze medal – third place	2022 Rome	49 kg
Pan American Championships
Gold medal – first place	2021 Cancun	-49 kg
Gold medal – first place	2022 Punta Cana	-49 kg
Pan American Games
Gold medal – first place	2019 Lima	-49 kg
Gold medal – first place	2023 Santiago	-49 kg
Central American and Caribbean Games
Gold medal – first place	2018 Barranquilla	-49 kg
Gold medal – first place	2026 Santo Domingo	-49 kg
Silver medal – second place	2023 San Salvador	-49 kg
World Junior Championships
Bronze medal – third place	2016 Burnaby	-49 kg
- Updated on 18 December 2022

Daniela Paola Souza Naranjo (Note: In this Spanish name, the first or paternal surname is Souza and the second or maternal family name is Naranjo.) (born 27 August 1999) is a Mexican taekwondo athlete of combat or kyorugi modality. She won the gold medal in the women's flyweight event at the 2022 World Taekwondo Championships held in Guadalajara, Mexico.

She has won bronze at the World Taekwondo Junior Championships in 2016, the gold medal at the Barranquilla Central American and Caribbean Games in 2018 and at the 2019 Pan American Games in the –49 kg category.

She participated in the 2019 World Taekwondo Championships in Manchester, reaching the quarterfinals of the flyweight tournament. After advancing on a first-round bye, she defeated Bouma Coulibaly from Ivory Coast and Avishag Semberg of Israel before falling to two-time Olympic gold medalist Wu Jingyu.

She was born in Zapopan, but considers Tijuana her hometown.
