= Mayerlin Mejía =

Dominican Republic taekwondo athlete

Personal information
- Full name: Mayerlin Yanay Mejía Matos
- Nationality: Dominican
- Born: 3 April 1994 (age 32) Azua, Azua
- Weight: 57 kg (126 lb)

Sport
- Sport: Taekwondo
Medal record
Women's taekwondo
Representing the Dominican Republic
Pan American Games
Gold medal – first place	2023 Santiago	Team
Central American and Caribbean Games
Silver medal – second place	2023 San Salvador	Team

Mayerlin Yanay Mejía Matos (born 3 April 1994) is a Dominican Republic taekwondo athlete. She became 2023 Pan American Games champion in the Kyorugi team competition.

== Early and personal life ==
Mejía was among the semi-finalists of the 2012 Dominican Republic National Reading Contest.

== Career ==
=== 2018 ===
Mejía participated in the Central American and Caribbean Games losing 4–26 in the quarterfinal round to the Cuban Tamara Robles.

=== 2022 ===
She participated in the World Championships and won her contest over Kenian Mary Muriu before losing 0–2 to seeded No.1 Chinese Luo Zongshi in the round of 32.

=== 2023 ===
At the 2023 Pan Am Series of Heredia, Costa Rica, she won the bronze medal when she lost to the Cuban Marlyn Pérez in the semifinal round. She won the 2023 Central American and Caribbean Games Team Kyorugui silver medal with Nahomy Víctor, Vanessa Corporan and Madelyn Rodríguez. Mejía represented her home country at the Pan American Games taekwondo competition, she lost 0–1 to American Caitlin Cox in the -57 kg category in the round of 16. She won the Kyorugi team competition gold medal with Madelyn Rodríguez and Katherine Rodríguez.
