= Iker Casas =

Mexican taekwondo practitioner

Personal information
- Born: 23 September 1999 (age 26)

Sport
- Country: Mexico
- Sport: Taekwondo
Medal record
Representing Mexico
Men's taekwondo
Grand Slam (Qualification)
Silver medal – second place	2018 Wuxi (I)	68 kg
Central American and Caribbean Games
Gold medal – first place	2026 Santo Domingo	80 kg
Bronze medal – third place	2018 Barranquilla	63 kg
Pan American Championships
Silver medal – second place	2021 Cancún	68 kg

Iker Casas García (born 23 September 1999) is a Mexican taekwondo practitioner. He won a bronze medal at the 2018 Central American and Caribbean Games and a silver at the 2021 Pan American Championships.

== Career ==
Casas suffered a quick exit after two matches at the 2014 World Junior Championships in Taiwan. In 2016 he won gold medals at the youth national championships and the Olimpiada Nacional (National Olympics), then finished fifth at the World Junior Championships held in Canada. Casas was subsequently promoted to the senior national team in 2017, though he was unable to compete for a spot at that year's World Championships due to injury.

In 2018, Casas qualified for the World Taekwondo Grand Slam by winning a silver medal at the first Open Qualification Tournament in April. That summer, he won a bronze medal at the Central American and Caribbean Games, losing in the semifinals to eventual gold medalist Bernardo Pié. He took the place of teammate Saúl Gutiérrez, who was unavailable for the tournament after undergoing knee surgery.

At the 2019 World Championships, Casas defeated Michele Ceccaroni of San Marino in the round of 64 before falling to Lee Dae-hoon. He qualified by defeating José Rubén Nava at the national selection tournament in Mexico City earlier that year. Nava returned the favor by denying Casas a place at the 2019 Pan American Games.

After the onset of the COVID-19 pandemic, Casas won a silver medal at the 2021 Pan American Championships held in Cancún.

== Personal life ==
Casas hails from the State of Mexico.
