= Lucas Ostapiv =

Brazilian taekwondo practitioner

Personal information
- Born: October 29, 1997 (age 28) Curitiba, PR, Brazil
Medal record
Men's taekwondo
Representing Brazil
Pan American Games
Bronze medal – third place	2023 Santiago	80 kg
Pan American Championships
Bronze medal – third place	2021 Cancún	−80 kg

Lucas de Krishna Ostapiv (born October 29, 1997) is a Brazilian taekwondo practitioner.

== Career ==
Ostapiv was born in Curitiba, and at the age of 10 he moved with his family to Pato Branco, where he graduated from high school at UTFPR, and studied Civil Engineering at UTFPR, Pato Branco campus.

Among his main achievements until 2021, he was a three-time Brazilian champion (2017, 2018, 2019); university Pan-American champion (2018); Chile Open champion (2019); member of the Brazilian team (category -80 kg); and bronze at the Pan-American championship (2021).

At the 2023 World Taekwondo Championships held in Baku, Azerbaijan, he won the first round but was eliminated in the round of 16 in the Men's welterweight category.

At the 2023 Pan American Games held in Santiago, Ostapiv won a bronze medal in the Men's 80 kg category.
