= Taekwondo at the 2023 Pan American Games – Women's 49 kg =

Women's 49 kg at the 2023 Pan American Games
- Venue: Contact Sports Center
- Start date: October 21, 2023
- End date: October 21, 2023
- Competitors: 14 from 14 nations

Medalists
Gold medal	Daniela Souza	Mexico
Silver medal	Andrea Ramírez	Colombia
Bronze medal	Giulia Sendra	Argentina
Bronze medal	Melina Daniel	United States

The women's 49 kg competition of the taekwondo events at the 2023 Pan American Games in Santiago, Chile, was held on October 21 at the Contact Sports Center. A total of 14 athletes from 14 NOC's competed.

== Qualification ==
The host nation, Chile, qualified automatically and the quotas spots were awarded at the qualification tournament held in Rio de Janeiro in March 2023. The final quota spots were awarded as wildcards (if applicable).

== Results ==
=== Bracket ===
Round of 16
Melina Daniel (USA)	2
Alessandra Suarez (PER)	0
Laura Sancho (CRC)	2
Ceili Peterson (GUY)	1
Marlyn Pérez (CUB)	1
Deisy Guelet (CHI)	2
Angelique Orozco (CAN)	0
Jireh Hurtado (BOL)	2
María Sara Grippoli (URU)	2
Virginia Dellan (VEN)	1
Giulia Sendra (ARG)	2
Victoria Stambaugh (PUR)	0

Quarterfinals
Daniela Souza (MEX)	2
Melina Daniel (USA)	0
Laura Sancho (CRC)	2
' Deisy Guelet (CHI)	0
Jireh Hurtado (BOL)	1
María Sara Grippoli (URU)	2
Giulia Sendra (ARG)	0
Andrea Ramírez (COL)	2

Semifinals
Daniela Souza (MEX)	2
Deisy Guelet (CHI)	0
María Sara Grippoli (URU)	0
Andrea Ramírez (COL)	2

Gold medal match
Daniela Souza (MEX)	2
Andrea Ramírez (COL)	1

=== Repechage ===
Bronze medal match
Deisy Guelet (CHI)	0
Giulia Sendra (ARG)	2

Bronze medal match
María Sara Grippoli (URU)	0
Melina Daniel (USA)	2
