= 2022 World Taekwondo Championships – Women's finweight =

Taekwondo competitions

Women's finweight at the 2022 World Championships
- Venue: Centro Acuático CODE Metropolitano
- Dates: 20 November 2022
- Competitors: 43 from 42 nations

Medalists
gold medal	Lena Stojković	Croatia
silver medal	Rukiye Yıldırım	Turkey
bronze medal	Huang Ying-hsuan	Chinese Taipei
bronze medal	Andrea Ramírez	Colombia

The women's finweight is a competition featured at the 2022 World Taekwondo Championships, and was held at the Centro Acuático CODE Metropolitano in Guadalajara, Mexico on 20 November 2022. Finweights were limited to a maximum of 46 kilograms in body mass.

== Results ==
Legend

- DQ — Won by disqualification
- P — Won by punitive declaration
- R — Won by referee stop contest

=== Finals ===
Semifinals			Final
Huang Ying-hsuan (TPE)	12	5
Rukiye Yıldırım (TUR)	13	12	Rukiye Yıldırım (TUR)	0	5
Andrea Ramírez (COL)	1	2	Lena Stojković (CRO)	5	10
Lena Stojković (CRO)	3	8

=== Top half ===
==== Section 1 ====
Round of 64
Zerlinda Li (HKG)	1	3
Stamatia Tsampala (GRE)	4	4
Dalila Villamil (CUB)	5	15
Verónica Vega (PUR)	3	1
Mahla Momenzadeh (IRI)	6	4	1
Huang Ying-hsuan (TPE)	1	5	5

Round of 32
Kang Mi-reu (KOR)	5	9^{R}
Stamatia Tsampala (GRE)	7	1
Angelique Orozco (CAN)	2	0
Rita Bakisheva (KAZ)	9	12
Dalya Rehani (FRA)	3	5
Dalila Villamil (CUB)	7	7
Huang Ying-hsuan (TPE)	6	12
Laura Sancho (CRC)	3	0

Round of 16
Kang Mi-reu (KOR)	11	8
Rita Bakisheva (KAZ)	7	2
Dalila Villamil (CUB)	15	3	1
Huang Ying-hsuan (TPE)	4	4	3

Quarterfinals
Kang Mi-reu (KOR)	7	10	8
Huang Ying-hsuan (TPE)	10^{P}	3	8

==== Section 2 ====
Round of 64
Vera Kapanadze (GEO)	0	0
Ida Tammila (FIN)	10	11
Juliet Lahood (AUS)	5	3
Rukiye Yıldırım (TUR)	11	10

Round of 32
Dina Pouryounes (RTA)	3	10
Ida Tammila (FIN)	2	2
Lana Komnenović (SRB)	0	1
Minaya Akbarova (AZE)	15	2
Karoline Castillo (PAN)	4	1	4
Phoenix Goodman (GBR)	1	7	17
Rukiye Yıldırım (TUR)	13	15	9
Amelia Espinosa (MEX)	14	9	2

Round of 16
Dina Pouryounes (RTA)	1	0	5
Minaya Akbarova (AZE)	6	0	12^{P}
Phoenix Goodman (GBR)	9	7	5
Rukiye Yıldırım (TUR)	8	16	10

Quarterfinals
Minaya Akbarova (AZE)	1	12	4
Rukiye Yıldırım (TUR)	3	9	5

=== Bottom half ===
==== Section 3 ====
Round of 64
Ni Kadek Heni Prikasih (INA)	9	5
Sidney Vicente (HON)	5	5
Hazel Della (USA)	12	0	0
Süheda Nur Çelik (GER)	9	6	5
Aissata Siby (MLI)	2	0
Zukhrakhon Tojimatova (UZB)	14	12

Round of 32
Valéria Santos (BRA)	2	0
Ni Kadek Heni Prikasih (INA)	14	12
Julanan Khantikulanon (THA)	1	4
Andrea Ramírez (COL)	9	10
Michelle Tau (LES)	0	6	3
Süheda Nur Çelik (GER)	6	6	10
Zukhrakhon Tojimatova (UZB)	26	0	12
Rivka Bayech (ISR)	22	15	16

Round of 16
Ni Kadek Heni Prikasih (INA)	4	5
Andrea Ramírez (COL)	7	10
Süheda Nur Çelik (GER)	13	9	9
Rivka Bayech (ISR)	11	10	4

Quarterfinals
Andrea Ramírez (COL)	4	3
Süheda Nur Çelik (GER)	0	2

==== Section 4 ====
Round of 64
Wang Xiaolu (CHN)	D	Q
~~Sofía Lieghio (URU)~~
~~Zaraou Abdou Bilane (NIG)~~
China Murakami (JPN)	D	Q
~~Ana Belo (TLS)~~	D	Q
~~Edina Sichangi (KEN)~~	D	Q

Round of 32
Soukaina Sahib (MAR)	1	4
Wang Xiaolu (CHN)	3	6
China Murakami (JPN)	4	2	3
Michal Zrihen (POR)	2	3	3
Ana Jiménez (ESP)	0	4
Viktoriia Nahurna (UKR)	0	5
Bye
Lena Stojković (CRO)

Round of 16
Wang Xiaolu (CHN)	7	7
Michal Zrihen (POR)	1	0
Viktoriia Nahurna (UKR)	0	1
Lena Stojković (CRO)	6	7

Quarterfinals
Wang Xiaolu (CHN)	0	0
Lena Stojković (CRO)	3	3
