= Taekwondo at the 2023 Pan American Games – Men's 80 kg =

Men's 80 kg at the 2023 Pan American Games
- Venue: Contact Sports Center
- Start date: October 22, 2023
- End date: October 22, 2023
- Competitors: 15 from 14 nations

Medalists
Gold medal	Carl Nickolas	United States
Silver medal	Miguel Trejos	Colombia
Bronze medal	Kelvin Calderón	Cuba
Bronze medal	Lucas Ostapiv	Brazil

The men's 80 kg competition of the taekwondo events at the 2023 Pan American Games in Santiago, Chile, was held on October 22 at the Contact Sports Center. A total of 15 athletes from 14 NOC's competed.

== Qualification ==
The host nation, Chile, automatically qualified automatically and the quotas spots were awarded at the qualification tournament held in Rio de Janeiro in March 2023. The final quota spots were awarded as wildcards (if applicable).

== Results ==
=== Bracket ===
Round of 16
Brandon Sealy (JAM)	1
Lucas Ostapiv (BRA)	2
Michael Rodriguez (USA)	2
Alejandro Flores (CRC)	0
Charlélie Mercier (CAN)	0
Joaquín Churchill (CHI)	2
Miguel Trejos (COL)	2
Kelvin Calderón (CUB)	0
Dylan Olmedo (ARG)	0
Moisés Hernández (DOM)	2
David Robleto (NCA)	2
Alejandro González (PUR)	1
Edgar Contreras (VEN)	0
Bryan Salazar (MEX)	2

Quarterfinals
Carl Nickolas (USA)	2
Lucas Ostapiv (BRA)	0
Michael Rodriguez (USA)	2
Joaquín Churchill (CHI)	1
Miguel Trejos (COL)	2
Moisés Hernández (DOM)	0
David Robleto (NCA)	2
Bryan Salazar (MEX)	1

Semifinals
Carl Nickolas (USA)	2
Michael Rodriguez (USA)	0
Miguel Trejos (COL)	2
David Robleto (NCA)	0

Gold medal match
Carl Nickolas (USA)	2
Miguel Trejos (COL)	0

=== Repechage ===
Bronze medal match
Lucas Ostapiv (BRA)	2
David Robleto (NCA)	0

Repechage		Bronze medal match
Kelvin Calderón (CUB)	2
Moisés Hernández (DOM)	1
Moisés Hernández (DOM)	1	Michael Rodriguez (USA)	0
		Kelvin Calderón (CUB)	2
