= Taekwondo at the 2019 Pan American Games – Women's 49 kg =

Taekwondo – Women's 49 kg at the 2019 Pan American Games
- Venue: Polideportivo Callao
- Dates: July 27
- Competitors: 13 from 13 nations

Medalists
Gold medal	Daniela Souza	Mexico
Silver medal	Talisca Reis	Brazil
Bronze medal	Monique Rodriguez	United States
Bronze medal	Andrea Ramírez	Colombia

The women's 49 kg competition of the taekwondo events at the 2019 Pan American Games took place on July 27 at the Polideportivo Callao.

== Results ==
=== Main bracket ===
The final results were:

Preliminary round
Yania Aguirre (CUB)	11
Estefanie Pedroza (GUA)	7
Daniela Souza (MEX)	25
Maria Bucheli (ECU)	11
Solansh Vargas (NCA)	8
Julissa Diez Canseco (PER)	11
Cristina Vazquez (ARG)	10
Victoria Stambaugh (PUR)	10
Monique Rodriguez (USA)	8
Virginia Dellan (VEN)	7

Quarterfinals
Yvette Yong (CAN)	7
Yania Aguirre (CUB)	20
Daniela Souza (MEX)	9
Julissa Diez Canseco (PER)	0
Andrea Ramírez (COL)	6
Victoria Stambaugh (PUR)	1
Monique Rodriguez (USA)	21
Talisca Reis (BRA)	29

Semifinals
Yania Aguirre (CUB)	3
Daniela Souza (MEX)	14
Andrea Ramírez (COL)	0
Talisca Reis (BRA)	1

Gold medal match
Daniela Souza (MEX)	4
Talisca Reis (BRA)	2

=== Repechage ===
Bronze medal match
Yania Aguirre (CUB)	7
Monique Rodriguez (USA)	16

Semifinal			Bronze medal match
			1	Julissa Diez Canseco (PER)	9
2	Maria Bucheli (ECU)	0		Andrea Ramírez (COL)	14
3	Julissa Diez Canseco (PER)	3
