= Miguel Trejos =

Colombian Taekwondo practitioner

Miguel Ángel Trejos Salas
Personal information
- Born: 18 April 1996 (age 30) Colombia

Sport
- Country: Colombia
- Sport: Taekwondo
Medal record
Representing Colombia
Men's taekwondo
Event	1st	2nd	3rd
World Championships	0	0	1
Pan American Games	1	1	1
Pan American Championships	0	1	4
CAC Games	1	1	0
South American Games	2	0	0
Bolivarian Games	2	1	1
Total	6	4	7
World Championships
Bronze medal – third place	2023 Baku	80 kg
Pan American Games
Gold medal – first place	2019 Lima	80 kg
Silver medal – second place	2023 Santiago	80 kg
Bronze medal – third place	2015 Toronto	68 kg
Pan American Championships
Silver medal – second place	2021 Cancún	80 kg
Bronze medal – third place	2016 Querétaro	68 kg
Bronze medal – third place	2018 Spokane	74 kg
Bronze medal – third place	2024 Rio de Janeiro	80 kg
Bronze medal – third place	2026 Rio de Janeiro	80 kg
Central American and Caribbean Games
Gold medal – first place	2023 San Salvador	80 kg
Silver medal – second place	2026 Santo Domingo	80 kg
South American Games
Gold medal – first place	2018 Cochabamba	80 kg
Gold medal – first place	2022 Asunción	80 kg
Bolivarian Games
Gold medal – first place	2017 Santa Marta	68 kg
Gold medal – first place	2022 Valledupar	80 kg
Silver medal – second place	2025 Lima-Ayacucho	80 kg
Bronze medal – third place	2025 Lima-Ayacucho	Team

Miguel Trejos (born April 18, 1996) is a Colombian taekwondo practitioner. He and boxer Yeni Arias were the flag bearers for the Colombian delegation at the 2023 Pan American Games Parade of Nations.

== Career ==
He competed at the 2019 Pan American Games in Lima and won a gold medal. He returned for the 2023 edition in Santiago to defend his title, but lost in the final and earned a silver medal.

== Achievements ==
Year	Tournament	Location	Result	Event
Representing Colombia
2015	Pan American Games	Toronto, Canada	3rd	68 kg
2016	Pan American Championships	Querétaro, Mexico	3rd	68 kg
2017	Bolivarian Games	Santa Marta, Colombia	1st	68 kg
2018	South American Games	Cochabamba, Bolivia	1st	80 kg
2018	Pan American Championships	Spokane, United States	3rd	74 kg
2019	Pan American Games	Lima, Peru	1st	80 kg
2021	Pan American Championships	Cancún, Mexico	2nd	80 kg
2022	Bolivarian Games	Valledupar, Colombia	1st	80 kg
2022	South American Games	Asunción, Paraguay	1st	80 kg
2023	World Championships	Baku, Azerbaijan	3rd	80 kg
2023	Central American and Caribbean Games	San Salvador, El Salvador	1st	80 kg
2023	Pan American Games	Santiago, Chile	2nd	80 kg
2024	Pan American Championships	Rio de Janeiro, Brazil	3rd	80 kg
2025	Bolivarian Games	Ayacucho, Perú	2nd	80 kg
2025	Bolivarian Games	Ayacucho, Perú	3rd	Team
2026	Pan American Championships	Rio de Janeiro, Brazil	3rd	80 kg
2026	Central American and Caribbean Games	Santo Domingo, Dominican Republic	2nd	80 kg
