= Lena Stojković =

Croatian taekwondo practitioner

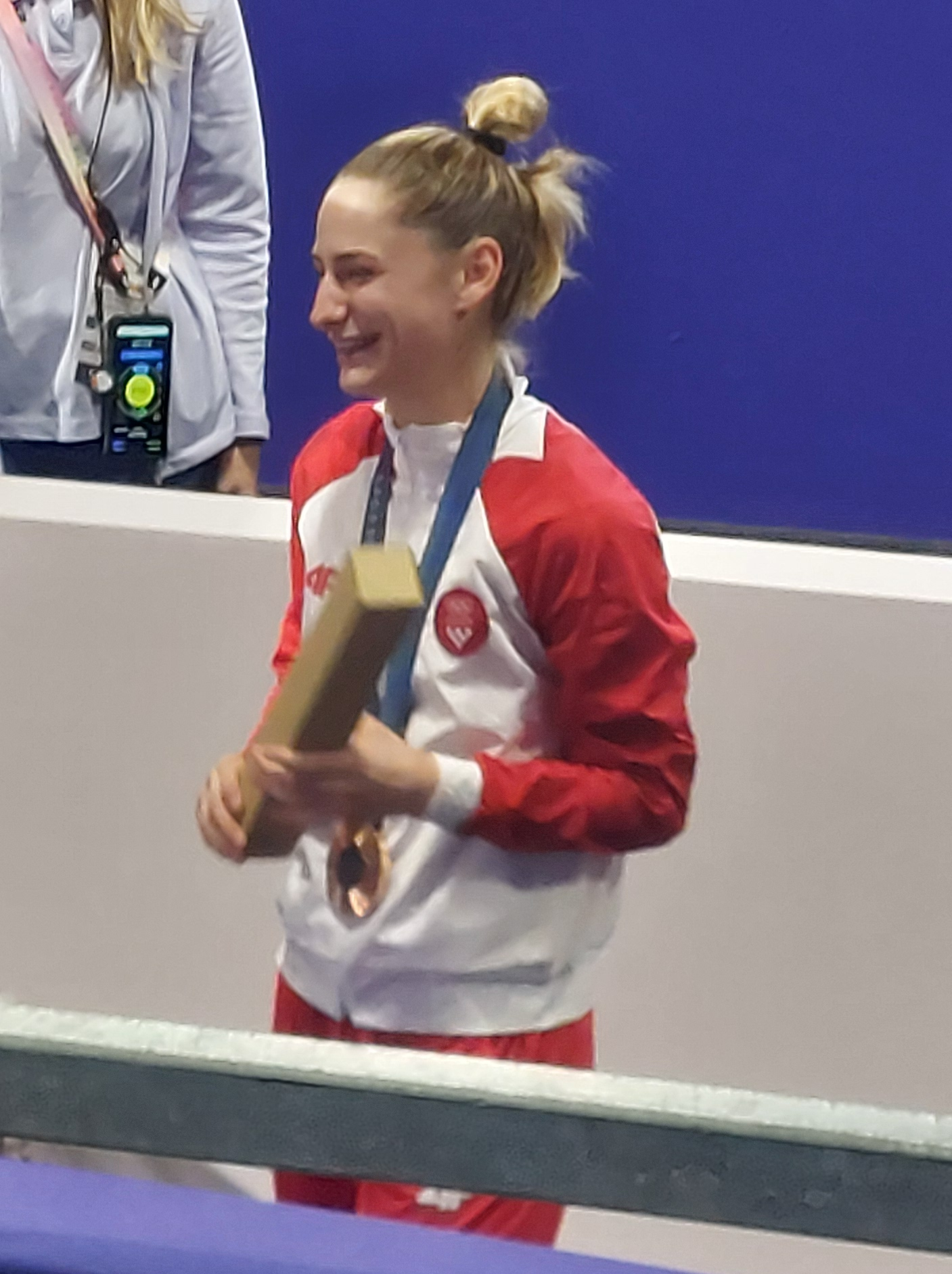
- Stojković at the 2024 Summer Olympics

Personal information
- Born: 3 January 2002 (age 24) Split, Croatia
- Height: 165 cm (5 ft 5 in) (2018)

Sport
- Country: Croatia
- Sport: Taekwondo
- Weight class: 46 kg, 49 kg
Medal record
Women's taekwondo
Representing Croatia
Olympic Games
Bronze medal – third place	2024 Paris	49 kg
World Championships
Gold medal – first place	2022 Guadalajara	46 kg
Gold medal – first place	2023 Baku	46 kg
European Games
Gold medal – first place	2023 Kraków-Małopolska	46 kg
European Championships
Gold medal – first place	2021 Sofia	46 kg
Gold medal – first place	2022 Manchester	46 kg
Gold medal – first place	2024 Belgrade	46 kg
Youth Olympic Games
Bronze medal – third place	2018 Buenos Aires	44 kg
World Junior Championships
Bronze medal – third place	2018 Hammamet	44 kg

Lena Stojković (born 3 January 2002) is a Croatian taekwondo practitioner. She is a two-time world champion, a three-time European champion and an Olympic bronze medalist.

Stojković won her first international senior title at the 2021 European Championships in the women's 46 kg event. She won gold medals at the 2022 European Championships and the 2022 World Championships. Stojković retained her title at the 2023 World Championships and won the gold medal at the 2023 European Games. She claimed a third European title at the 2024 European Championships and won a bronze medal in the women's 49 kg event at the 2024 Summer Olympics in Paris.

== Achievements ==
Year	Event	Location	Place
2021	European Championships	Sofia, Bulgaria	1st
2022	European Championships	Manchester, United Kingdom	1st
2022	World Championships	Guadalajara, Mexico	1st
2023	World Championships	Baku, Azerbaijan	1st
2023	European Games	Kraków and Małopolska, Poland	1st
2024	European Championships	Belgrade, Serbia	1st
2024	Olympic Games	Paris, France	3rd
