= 2022 World Taekwondo Championships – Women's flyweight =

Taekwondo competitions

Women's flyweight at the 2022 World Championships
- Venue: Centro Acuático CODE Metropolitano
- Dates: 16 November 2022
- Competitors: 49 from 49 nations

Medalists
gold medal	Daniela Souza	Mexico
silver medal	Guo Qing	China
bronze medal	Dunya Abutaleb	Saudi Arabia
bronze medal	Panipak Wongpattanakit	Thailand

The women's flyweight is a competition featured at the 2022 World Taekwondo Championships, and was held at the Centro Acuático CODE Metropolitano in Guadalajara, Mexico on 16 November 2022. Flyweights were limited to a maximum of 49 kilograms in body mass.

== Results ==
Legend

- DQ — Won by disqualification
- P — Won by punitive declaration
- R — Won by referee stop contest

=== Finals ===
Semifinals				Final
Dunya Abutaleb (KSA)	0
Guo Qing (CHN)	4^{R}			Guo Qing (CHN)	3	8	2
Daniela Souza (MEX)	0	5	5	Daniela Souza (MEX)	4	4	8
Panipak Wongpattanakit (THA)	4	1	4

=== Top half ===
==== Section 1 ====
Round of 64
Fátima Abombwet (GAB)	1	7
Chanel Rosado (PUR)	5	9
Nikolet Kostova (BUL)	0	1
Ouhoud Ben Aoun (TUN)	4	7
Zarnigor Khusniddinova (UZB)	6	0	6
Rabab Ouhadi (MAR)	2	5	9
Matilde Ferreira (POR)	2	3
Jade Castillo (DEN)	7	5
Botakoz Kapanova (KAZ)	2	5
Dunya Abutaleb (KSA)	3	9

Round of 32
Adriana Cerezo (ESP)	8	13
Chanel Rosado (PUR)	0	3
Ouhoud Ben Aoun (TUN)	0	0
Rabab Ouhadi (MAR)	4	2
Shahd El-Hosseiny (EGY)	4	4
Jade Castillo (DEN)	0	3
Dunya Abutaleb (KSA)	2	3	6
Supharada Kisskalt (GER)	7	2	4

Round of 16
Adriana Cerezo (ESP)	2	3
Rabab Ouhadi (MAR)	1	0
Shahd El-Hosseiny (EGY)	1	0
Dunya Abutaleb (KSA)	2	6

Quarterfinals
Adriana Cerezo (ESP)	3	0
Dunya Abutaleb (KSA)	4	0

==== Section 2 ====
Round of 64
Riccy Talbott (HON)	9	9
Deisy Guelet (CHI)	4	5
Sarah Al-Halwani (ITA)	2	7
Laura García (COL)	1	4
Mayra Cáceres (PAR)	0	0
Ghazal Soltani (IRI)	8	12
~~Farida Soumana (NIG)~~
Jenna Ylönen (FIN)	D	Q

Round of 32
Bruna Duvančić (CRO)	12	12
Riccy Talbott (HON)	3	0
Sarah Al-Halwani (ITA)	4	3
Trương Thị Kim Tuyền (VIE)	5	4
Guo Qing (CHN)	5	11	12
Ghazal Soltani (IRI)	9	3	9
Jenna Ylönen (FIN)	0	0
Merve Dinçel (TUR)	7	7

Round of 16
Bruna Duvančić (CRO)	9	6	11^{P}
Trương Thị Kim Tuyền (VIE)	9	8	1
Guo Qing (CHN)	9	2	11
Merve Dinçel (TUR)	5	3	5

Quarterfinals
Bruna Duvančić (CRO)	6	4
Guo Qing (CHN)	7	4

=== Bottom half ===
==== Section 3 ====
Round of 64
Nahomy Víctor (DOM)	1	1
Lam Siu Wai (HKG)	2	4
Ariana Portuguez (CRC)	6	5
Munirah Abdiwahid (SOM)	0	0
Huang Shih-hui (TPE)	0	5	4
Sharon Wakoli (KEN)	4	3	10
Patimat Abakarova (AZE)	10	11
Anastasia Kokosi (GRE)	2	2

Round of 32
Daniela Souza (MEX)	13	5
Lam Siu Wai (HKG)	0	0
Ariana Portuguez (CRC)	2	3
Saffron Tambyrajah (AUS)	3	9
Camila Bezerra (BRA)	3	1
Sharon Wakoli (KEN)	1	0
Patimat Abakarova (AZE)	2	0
Avishag Semberg (ISR)	6	6

Round of 16
Daniela Souza (MEX)	2	1
Saffron Tambyrajah (AUS)	1	1
Camila Bezerra (BRA)	0	1
Avishag Semberg (ISR)	1	8

Quarterfinals
Daniela Souza (MEX)	6	1	7
Avishag Semberg (ISR)	9	1	7

==== Section 4 ====
Round of 64
~~Mahadula Kumari (SRI)~~
Henrietta Armah (GHA)	D	Q
Lizette Salas (USA)	8	8
Ruka Kishida (JPN)	0	4
Indra Bodén (SWE)	1	10
Giulia Sendra (ARG)	0	0
Naiara Liñán (AND)	2	1
Nabintou Koné (CIV)	3	1

Round of 32
Kang Bo-ra (KOR)	D	Q
~~Henrietta Armah (GHA)~~
Lizette Salas (USA)	1	0
Maddison Moore (GBR)	9	13
Viviane Tranquille (CAN)	1	12^{P}	9
Indra Bodén (SWE)	2	4	6
Nabintou Koné (CIV)	1	1
Panipak Wongpattanakit (THA)	8	10

Round of 16
Kang Bo-ra (KOR)	7	5
Maddison Moore (GBR)	6	4
Viviane Tranquille (CAN)	0	1
Panipak Wongpattanakit (THA)	11	9

Quarterfinals
Kang Bo-ra (KOR)	8	3	0
Panipak Wongpattanakit (THA)	8	11	12
