= Avishag Semberg =

Israeli female taekwondo practitioner

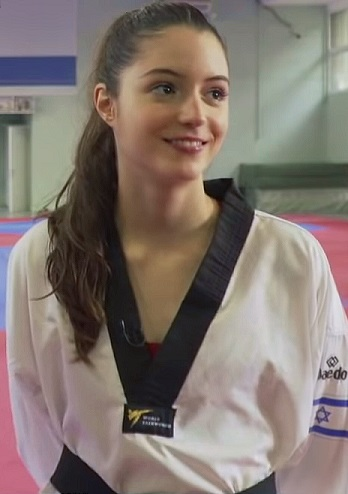
- Semberg in 2020

Personal information
- Native name: אבישג סמברג
- Born: Avishag Semberg; 16 September 2001 (age 25) Gedera, Israel
- Height: 1.68 m (5 ft 6 in)
- Weight: 49 kg (108 lb)

Sport
- Country: Israel
- Sport: Taekwondo
- Weight class: 49 kg (108 lb)/ 53 kg (117 lb)
- Club: Sharabi Martial Arts
- Coached by: Yechiam Sharabi

Achievements and titles
- Olympic finals: (bronze) (2021)
- World finals: 5th (2022)
- Regional finals: (silver) (2022)
Medal record
Representing Israel
Women's taekwondo
Olympic Games
Bronze medal – third place	2020 Tokyo	49 kg
European Championships
Silver medal – second place	2022 Manchester	49 kg
European Championships OWC
Gold medal – first place	2020 Sarajevo	49 kg
World Junior Championships
Bronze medal – third place	2016 Burnaby	46 kg
European U21 Championships
Bronze medal – third place	2019 Helsingborg	49 kg
European Junior Championships
Bronze medal – third place	2017 Larnaca	46 kg

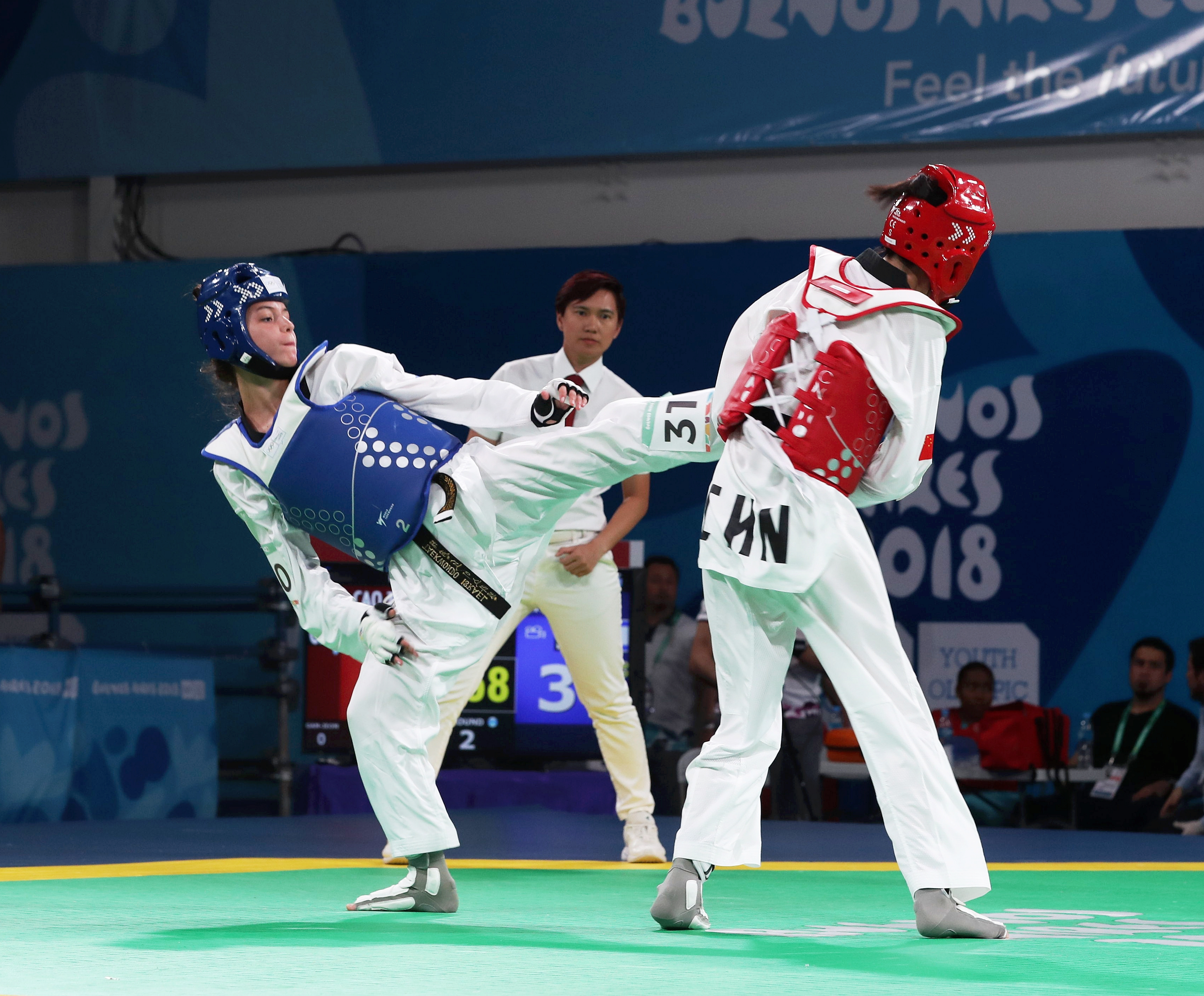
Semberg (left) at the 2018 Summer Youth Olympics

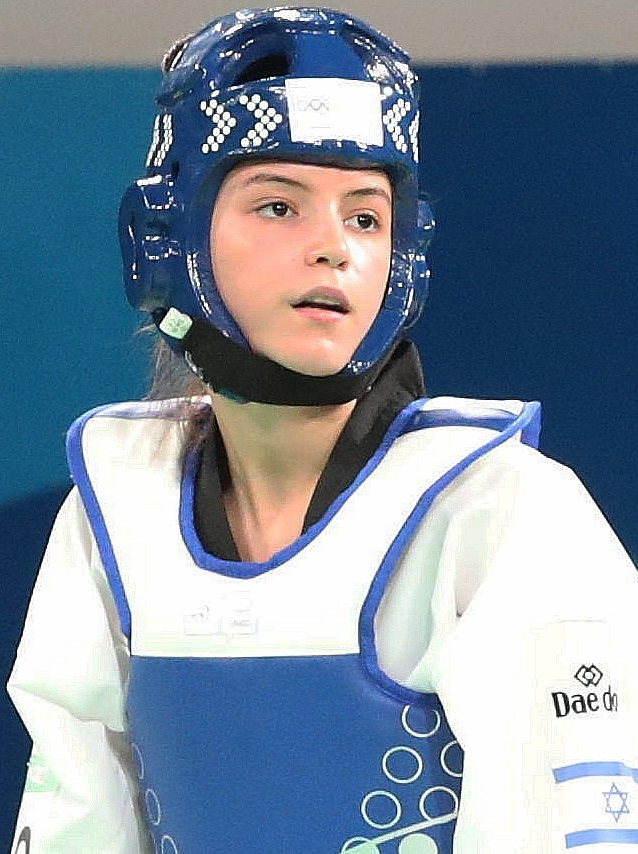
Semberg in 2018

Avishag Semberg (or Abishag Samberg, Hebrew: אבישג סמברג; born 16 September 2001) is an Israeli Olympic taekwondo athlete. She is an Olympic bronze medalist for Israel at the 2020 Summer Olympics in the women's 49 kg competition. She won Israel's all-time tenth Olympic medal, and is the youngest Israeli to receive an Olympic medal, at the age of 19. Semberg represented Israel at the 2024 Paris Olympics in the women's taekwondo -49 kg category. Saudi athlete Dunya Abutaleb defeated Semberg in the first round.

== Early life ==
Semberg was born and raised in Gedera, Israel, to Israeli parents Oren Sermberg and Nili Cohen-Semberg, and is Jewish. Her father is of Ashkenazi Jewish descent, whereas her mother is of both Sephardi Jewish and Mizrahi Jewish (Moroccan-Jewish) descent. Her father is a lawyer, and her mother works at a health service organization. She has two younger sisters.

In 2015, at 13 years of age Semberg participated in the third season of the Israeli The Kids' Channel reality game show The Boys and The Girls (HaBanim VeHaBanot), and was the ninth-eliminated contestant, the last one right before the finale where her girl teammates have won. At 16 years of age she moved to a training facility in Ramla, Israel.

Semberg was conscripted to the IDF in 2020, serving as a lieutenant in the protection and engineering department of the Home Front Command, where she among other things performed kitchen and guard duty, and was also designated an "Outstanding Sportswoman" and allowed time off to train and compete. She had an honorable discharge in November 2021 after completing her military enlistment. Her best friend is Assaf Yassur, an amputee world champion taekwondo fighter.

== Taekwondo career ==
She began in taekwondo at the age of 6 while in the first grade, with coach Maoz Sharabi, the brother of her current coach, Yachiam Sharabi. Initially once a week she would take a 40-minute after-school class in Gedara. When she turned 8 years old, she was paired in fights against boys who were her size. She said: "I would come to school, and I would only think about training."

At 9 years of age she trained four times a week. Semberg has trained since the age of 9 at the Sharabi Martial Arts club in Ramla, Israel, where she has resided as well since she turned 16 years of age, coached by Israeli trainer Yechiam Sharabi. She usually has three training sessions a day. The first is two to three hours in the morning, followed by gym or flexibility training, which is followed in turn by another training session in the evening, for a total of six to eight hours of training a day. She said she has had one concussion, had her nose broken twice, and regularly suffers broken fingers.

=== Early years; European champion ===
In sixth grade, she became a member of the Israel National Team.

In 2012 Semberg won a gold medal in the Israel Cadets Open in the 33 kg weight class in Ashdod, Israel, in 2013 she won a gold medal in the Israel Cadets Open in the 37 kg weight class in Ashdod, in 2014 she won a silver medal in the Croatia Open in the 41 kg weight class in Zagreb, and in 2015 she won a gold medal in the Israel Cadets Open in the 44 kg weight class in Ramla, Israel.

In November 2016 Semberg won a bronze medal at the youth World Taekwondo Championships in Burnaby, Canada, in the 46 kg weight class.

In 2017 she won a bronze medal in the European Youth Championships in the 46 kg weight class in Larnaca, Cyprus. That year she also won a gold medal in the Israel Senior Open in the 46 kg weight class in Ramla.

In 2018, Semberg was scheduled to compete for Israel at the 2018 World Junior Championships in Tunisia. Tunisian authorities said they would only allow the Israelis to compete if their uniforms did not feature any Israeli national symbol or insignia, and that the Israeli anthem would not be played for any Israeli winners. Despite the fact that the Israeli team agreed, the Tunisian government then denied them visas, stating that the Israelis' application forms weren't received in time.

On 8 October 2018 she placed fifth at the Girls' 49 kg competition in the 2018 Summer Youth Olympics in Buenos Aires, Argentina. She was given the honor of carrying the Israeli flag at the Opening Ceremony. Also that year, she won a gold medal in the 2018 Polish Youth Open in Warsaw, and bronze medals in the 2018 Austrian Open in Innsbruck and the Israel Open in Ramla, in the 49 kg weight class.

In 2019 she won a bronze medal in the European Junior (under-21) Championships in Helsingborg, Sweden. She also won gold medals in the Israel Senior Open in Ramla in the 49 kg weight class and the Riga Senior Open in Latvia in the 53 kg weight class, silver medals in the Ukraine Open in Kharkiv and the Luxembourg Open in the 53 kg weight class, and a bronze medal in the Polish Open in Warsaw in the 53 kg weight class.

In 2020 she won a gold medal in the European Clubs Senior Championships in Zagreb, Croatia, in the 49 kg weight class.

On 7 May 2021 Semberg qualified for the 2020 Summer Olympics in Tokyo, Japan, by winning the gold medal in the 2021 European Taekwondo Olympic Qualification Tournament in Sofia, Bulgaria; she then contracted Covid, and spent weeks at home recovering. She won all 12 of her bouts. She also won the gold medal in the women's -49 kg category in the 2021 European Taekwondo Championships in Sarajevo, Bosnia and Herzegovina.

=== 2020 Summer Olympics – Olympic bronze medal ===
Competing in the women's 49 kg for Israel at the 2020 Summer Olympics, on its opening day Semberg beat Puerto Rican Victoria Stambaugh 22–2 in the qualification round, before losing to Thai 2015 and 2019 world champion and eventual gold medalist Panipak Wongpattanakit in the round of 16. With Wongpattanakit progressing to the final, Semberg got to compete in the repechage, where she beat 8th-seeded Trương Thị Kim Tuyền from Vietnam 22–1 to qualify for the bronze medal match against Turkey's 2010 and 2018 European Champion Rukiye Yıldırım, whom Semberg beat, 27–22, earning Israel's first Olympic medal (all-time, tenth) in the 2020 Summer games, and first in taekwondo. Semberg was also the youngest Israeli to win an Olympic medal, at age 19.

Upon returning to her hometown she spoke at an event in her honor, saying: "I want to send a message to young girls and boys who are training or are thinking of training that anything is possible. Sometimes I doubted myself and said, ‘I’m just a girl from Gedera, can I really be at the top?’ So yes, you can be at the top, you just need to dream big and dream of it every day."

=== 2021–present; European Championships silver medal ===
Later in 2021 she won gold medals in the 2021 Montenegro Open in Podgorica, and in the Bosnia Herzegovina Open in Sarajevo, in the 53 kg weight class.

In May 2022, Semberg won the silver medal in the 2022 European Championships in Manchester, England, in the 49 kg weight class. Also that year she won gold medals in the Croatia Open in Zagreb (53 kg), the Albania Open in Tirana (49 kg), and the Serbia Open in Belgrad (49 kg), a silver medal in the Sofia Open in Bulgaria (49 kg), and a bronze medal in the Israel Open in Ramla (49 kg).

In 2023 she won a silver medal in the European Clubs Senior Championships in Sofia, Bulgaria, and a bronze medal in the Sofia Open also in Bulgaria, both in the 53 kg weight class. That year she also won a bronze medal in the Polish Open in Warsaw, in the 53 kg weight class.

Semberg won a gold medal at the February 2024 Austrian Open Competition, and dedicated her medal to Irish-Israeli Kim Damti, hostage Omer Wenkert, and to all the IDF soldiers. She said: “My friend Kim was murdered at the Nova party. Omer, who for years sat next to me in class, was kidnapped in Gaza. It’s hard for me to think about it. For weeks I sat at home and asked myself, ‘What’s relevant now?’ On October 7, we were at a competition in China, sitting in the dining room in shock, and saw the Jordanian team walking past and laughing. This is inhumane behaviour. The world does not understand what is happening in Israel.”

In March 2024, she won the gold medal in the 2024 European Taekwondo Qualification Tournament in Sofia, Bulgaria, in the 49 kg weight class. That year she also won the Austrian Open in Innsbruck, in the 53 kg weight class.

=== 2024 Paris Olympics ===
Semberg represented Israel at the 2024 Paris Olympics in the women's taekwondo -49 kg category at the Grand Palais strip. She was eliminated from the 2024 Olympics after losing to Saudi athlete Dunya Abutaleb in her first round match.

== Personal life ==
Semberg is in a relationship with Israeli taekwondo athlete Nimrod Kravitzky since 2019. They married in 2025.

== See also ==
- List of Jews in taekwondo
- List of Jewish Olympic medalists
- List of Olympic medalists in taekwondo
- Women of Israel
- Women in the Israel Defense Forces
