= Jefferson Ochoa =

Colombian taekwondo practitioner

Personal information
- Full name: Jefferson Alfredo Ochoa Fernández
- Born: 9 November 1996 (age 29) Santa Marta, Colombia
- Height: 1.76 m (5 ft 9 in)
- Weight: 58 kg (128 lb)

Sport
- Country: Colombia
- Sport: Taekwondo
- Weight class: 58 kg
Medal record
Representing Colombia
Men's taekwondo
| Event | 1st | 2nd | 3rd |
|---|---|---|---|
| Pan American Championships | 0 | 1 | 1 |
| CAC Games | 0 | 1 | 1 |
| South American Games | 0 | 0 | 1 |
| Bolivarian Games | 1 | 2 | 1 |
| Total | 1 | 4 | 4 |
Pan American Championships
| Silver medal – second place | 2021 Cancún | 58 kg |
| Bronze medal – third place | 2022 Punta Cana | 58 kg |
Central American and Caribbean Games
| Silver medal – second place | 2023 San Salvador | 58 kg |
| Bronze medal – third place | 2018 Barranquilla | 58 kg |
South American Games
| Bronze medal – third place | 2022 Asunción | 58 kg |
Bolivarian Games
| Gold medal – first place | 2022 Valledupar | 58 kg |
| Silver medal – second place | 2017 Santa Marta | 58 kg |
| Silver medal – second place | 2025 Lima-Ayacucho | 58 kg |
| Bronze medal – third place | 2025 Lima-Ayacucho | Team |

Jefferson Ochoa Fernández (born 9 November 1996) is a Colombian taekwondo practitioner.

In 2019, he competed in the men's flyweight at the World Taekwondo Championships held in Manchester, United Kingdom.

He qualified at the 2020 Pan American Taekwondo Olympic Qualification Tournament in Heredia, Costa Rica to represent Colombia at the 2020 Summer Olympics in Tokyo, Japan. He competed in the men's 58 kg event where he was eliminated in his first match.

In 2021, he won the silver medal in the men's 58 kg event at the Pan American Taekwondo Championships held in Cancún, Mexico.

== Achievements ==
| Year | Tournament | Location | Result | Event |
Representing Colombia
| 2017 | Bolivarian Games | Santa Marta, Colombia | 2nd | 58 kg |
| 2018 | Central American and Caribbean Games | Barranquilla, Colombia | 3rd | 58 kg |
| 2021 | Pan American Championships | Cancún, Mexico | 2nd | 58 kg |
| 2022 | Pan American Championships | Punta Cana, Dominican Republic | 3rd | 58 kg |
| 2022 | Bolivarian Games | Valledupar, Colombia | 1st | 58 kg |
| 2022 | South American Games | Asunción, Paraguay | 3rd | 58 kg |
| 2023 | Central American and Caribbean Games | San Salvador, El Salvador | 2nd | 58 kg |
| 2025 | Bolivarian Games | Ayacucho, Perú | 2nd | 58 kg |
| 2025 | Bolivarian Games | Ayacucho, Perú | 3rd | Team |
