= Nishy Lee Lindo =

Costa Rican taekwondo practitioner

Personal information
- Born: 30 November 2002 (age 23)

Sport
- Country: Costa Rica
- Sport: Taekwondo
Medal record
Women's taekwondo
Representing Costa Rica
Pan American Games
Bronze medal – third place	2019 Lima	57 kg

Nishy Lee Lindo (born 30 November 2002) is a Costa Rican taekwondo practitioner. She won a bronze medal in the women's 57 kg event at the 2019 Pan American Games held in Lima, Peru.

In 2020, she competed at the Pan American Olympic Qualification Tournament held in Costa Rica. She finished in 3rd place which meant that she did not qualify to compete at the 2020 Summer Olympics in Tokyo, Japan. However, she was eventually able to compete after all as Fernanda Aguirre of Chile had to withdraw after testing positive for COVID-19. At the Olympics, Lindo was eliminated in her first match in the women's 57 kg event.

She competed in the women's featherweight event at the 2022 World Taekwondo Championships held in Guadalajara, Mexico.
