= Andrea Ramírez (taekwondo) =

Colombian taekwondo practitioner

Personal information
- Full name: Andrea Ramírez Vargas
- Born: 4 September 1998 (age 28) Sogamoso, Colombia
- Height: 1.60 m (5 ft 3 in)
- Weight: 49 kg (108 lb)

Sport
- Country: Colombia
- Sport: Taekwondo
Medal record
Representing Colombia
Women's taekwondo
Event	1st	2nd	3rd
World Championships	0	0	2
Pan American Games	0	1	1
Pan American Championships	2	0	0
CAC Games	2	1	0
South American Games	2	0	0
Bolivarian Games	2	2	0
Total	8	4	3
World Championships
Bronze medal – third place	2017 Muju	46 kg
Bronze medal – third place	2022 Guadalajara	46 kg
Pan American Games
Silver medal – second place	2023 Santiago	49 kg
Bronze medal – third place	2019 Lima	49 kg
Pan American Championships
Gold medal – first place	2021 Cancún	46 kg
Gold medal – first place	2022 Punta Cana	46 kg
Central American and Caribbean Games
Gold medal – first place	2018 Barranquilla	46 kg
Gold medal – first place	2023 San Salvador	49 kg
Silver medal – second place	2026 Santo Domingo	49 kg
South American Games
Gold medal – first place	2022 Asunción	49 kg
Gold medal – first place	2026 Santa Fe	49 kg
Bolivarian Games
Gold medal – first place	2022 Valledupar	49 kg
Gold medal – first place	2025 Lima-Ayacucho	49 kg
Silver medal – second place	2017 Santa Marta	46 kg
Silver medal – second place	2025 Lima-Ayacucho	Team

Andrea Ramírez (born 4 September 1998) is a Colombian taekwondo practitioner. She won one of the bronze medals in the women's finweight event at the 2017 World Taekwondo Championships held in Muju, South Korea.

In 2019, she won one of the bronze medals in the women's 49 kg event at the Pan American Games held in Lima, Peru. In 2020, she qualified at the Pan American Taekwondo Qualification Tournament to compete at the 2020 Summer Olympics in Tokyo, Japan. She competed in the women's 49 kg event.

== Achievements ==
Year	Tournament	Location	Result	Event
Representing Colombia
2017	World Championships	Muju, South Korea	3rd	46 kg
2017	Bolivarian Games	Santa Marta, Colombia	2nd	46 kg
2018	Central American and Caribbean Games	Barranquilla, Colombia	1st	46 kg
2019	Pan American Games	Lima, Peru	3rd	49 kg
2021	Pan American Championships	Cancún, Mexico	1st	46 kg
2022	Pan American Championships	Punta Cana, Dominican Republic	1st	46 kg
2022	Bolivarian Games	Valledupar, Colombia	1st	49 kg
2022	South American Games	Asunción, Paraguay	1st	49 kg
2022	World Championships	Guadalajara, Mexico	3rd	46 kg
2023	Central American and Caribbean Games	San Salvador, El Salvador	1st	49 kg
2023	Pan American Games	Santiago, Chile	2nd	49 kg
2025	Bolivarian Games	Ayacucho, Perú	1st	49 kg
2025	Bolivarian Games	Ayacucho, Perú	2nd	Team
2026	Central American and Caribbean Games	Santo Domingo, Dominican Republic	2nd	49 kg
2026	South American Games	Rosario, Argentina	1st	49 kg
