= Brenda Costa =

Brazilian model (born 1992)

- Born: Brenda Costa; 8 November 1982 (age 42); Rio de Janeiro, Rio de Janeiro state, Brazil
- Modeling information
- Height: 5 ft 9.5 in (1.77 m)
- Agency: Agência Mega

Brenda Costa (born 8 November 1992) is a Brazilian fashion model and former swimmer. Brenda Costa is 177 cm (5 feet 9.5 inches) tall. Her model career started when she was 16 years old after she was discovered in the Ipanema neighborhood by Agência Mega. She was on the cover of the April 2004 French edition of ELLE magazine. In November 2005 she appeared on an episode of Tout le monde en parle. Costa, who was born deaf, has a tattoo of an eye on the base of neck which signifies that she is on the lookout for people who mistreat her behind her back.
