= Fernanda Aguirre =

Chilean taekwondo practitioner

Personal information
- Full name: Fernanda Nicole Aguirre Ramirez
- Born: 29 July 1999 (age 26)
- Height: 172 cm (5 ft 8 in)

Sport
- Country: Chile
- Sport: Taekwondo
- Weight class: 57 kg
Medal record
Women's taekwondo
Representing Chile
Bolivarian Games
| Silver medal – second place | 2022 Valledupar | 57 kg |
| Bronze medal – third place | 2017 Santa Marta | 57 kg |
Pan American Games
| Bronze medal – third place | 2019 Lima | 57 kg |
Pan American Championships
| Bronze medal – third place | 2018 Spokane | 57 kg |
| Bronze medal – third place | 2021 Cancún | 57 kg |
Summer Universiade
| Bronze medal – third place | 2019 Naples | 57 kg |

Fernanda Nicole Aguirre Ramirez (born 29 July 1999) is a Chilean taekwondo practitioner. She won one of the bronze medals in the women's 57 kg event at the 2019 Pan American Games held in Lima, Peru. In her bronze medal match she defeated Carolena Carstens of Panama.

In 2017, Aguirre competed in the women's lightweight event at the World Taekwondo Championships held in Muju, South Korea where she was eliminated in her first match by Kimia Alizadeh of Iran. In the same year, she also competed at the 2017 Summer Universiade held in Taipei, Taiwan without winning a medal. At the 2017 Bolivarian Games held in Santa Marta, Colombia, she won one of the bronze medals in the women's 57 kg event. In 2018, she won one of the bronze medals in her event at the 2018 Pan American Taekwondo Championships held in Spokane, United States.

In 2019, Aguirre represented Chile at the Summer Universiade in Naples, Italy and she won one of the bronze medals in the women's 57 kg event. She also won one of the bronze medals in her event at the 2021 Pan American Taekwondo Championships held in Cancún, Mexico.

Aguirre had qualified to represent Chile at the 2020 Summer Olympics in Tokyo, Japan but she had to withdraw due to a positive COVID-19 test. Nishy Lee Lindo of Costa Rica competed as her replacement in the women's 57 kg event. In 2022, Aguirre won the silver medal in her event at the Bolivarian Games held in Valledupar, Colombia.
