= Miyu Yamada =

Japanese taekwondo practitioner

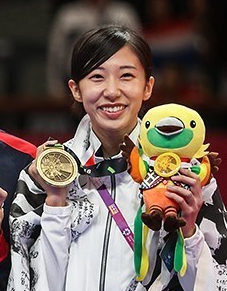
- Yamada at the 2018 Asian Games

Personal information
- Born: December 13, 1993 (age 32) Seto, Aichi, Japan
- Education: Daito Bunka University
- Height: 168 cm (5 ft 6 in)

Sport
- Sport: Taekwondo
Medal record
Representing Japan
Asian Games
Bronze medal – third place	2018 Jakarta	-49 kg

Miyu Yamada (山田美諭, Yamada Miyu; born December 13, 1993) is a Japanese taekwondo competitor. Competing in the 49 kg category she won a bronze medal at the 2018 Asian Games and placed fifth in 2014.

Her elder brother Yuma Yamada won a bronze medal in taekwondo at the 2014 Asian Games.
