= Rivka Bayech =

Israel taekwondo practitioner

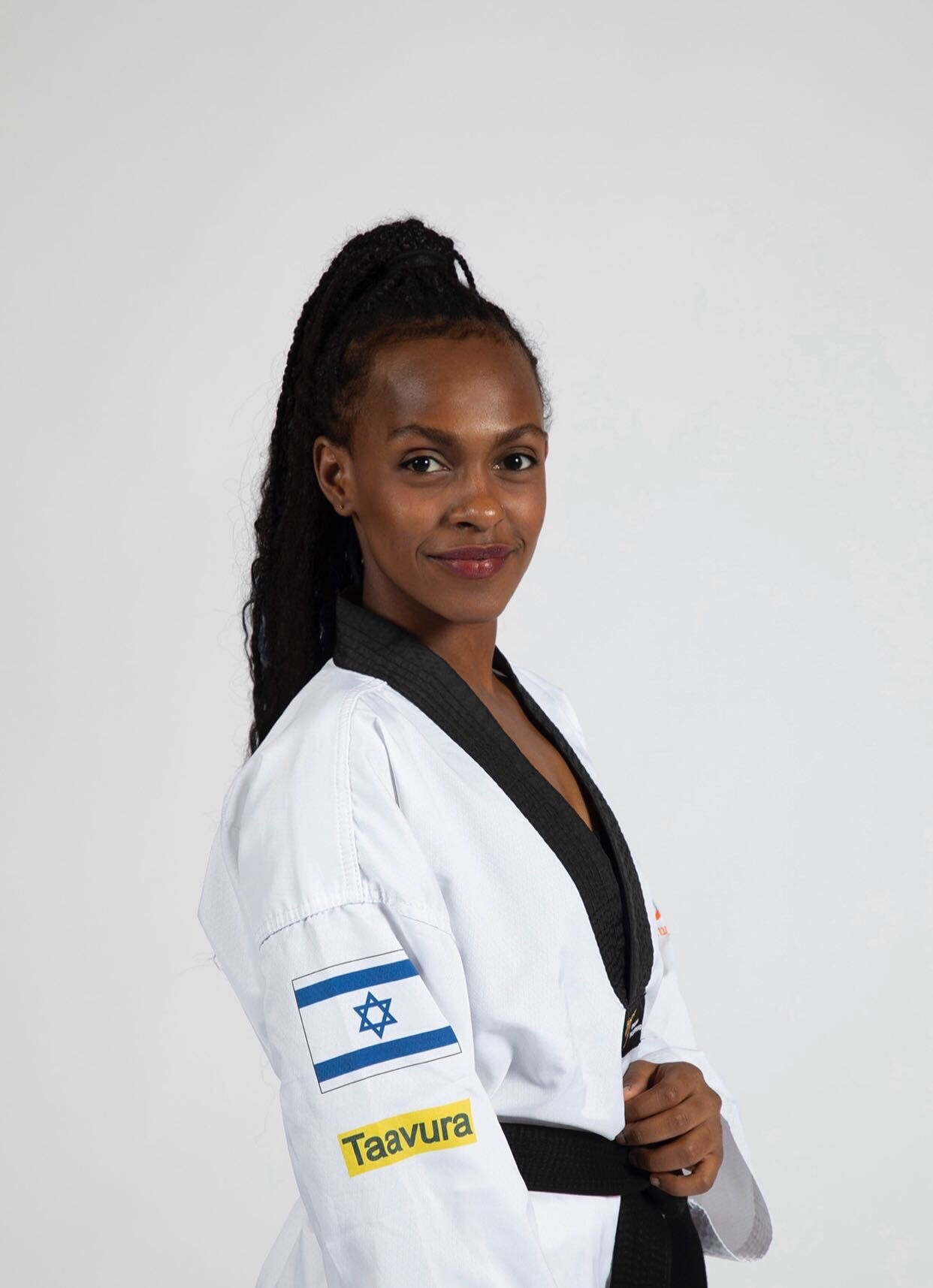

Personal information
- Nationality: Israel
- Born: 25 June 1999 (age 27) Chwahit, Amhara, Ethiopia
- Height: 1.53 m (5 ft 0 in)
- Weight: 49 kg (108 lb)

Sport
- Sport: Taekwondo
- Event: 49 kg
Medal record
Women's taekwondo
Representing Israel
European Championships
Bronze medal – third place	2026 Munich	46 kg

Rivka Bayech (Hebrew: רבקה באייך); born June 25, 1999) is an Israeli taekwondo fighter who competes in the weight categories of both up to 46 kg and 49 kg. She won three bronze medals at the European Championships of 2021, 2022, and 2023, as well as a gold medal in the "G1" World Cup for 2020.

== Biography ==
Bayech was born in Chwahit, Ethiopia. Her family lived in a reception center in Be'er Sheva, and later moved to Rishon Lezion in 2012, with her mother and three sisters. At 13, she started practicing taekwondo as part of the Young Warrior Taekwondo project for girls from Ethiopia in her school.

== Career and awards ==
Bayech won a silver medal in the weight category of up to 42 kg at the European Youth Championships held in 2016, at Latvia. Again in 2020, she won a gold medal in the weight category of up to 46 kg in the G1 World Cup competition held in Helsingborg, Sweden. She has wkn the 2021 bronze medal in the weight category of up to 46 kg at the European Championships held in Sofia, Bulgaria, and the state championship in the weight category of up to 46 kg. In October 2021, Bayech was injured during a competition in Montenegro when an opponent fell on her leg. Her injury lasted for 7 months, and until about a month before the 2022 European Championships there was no certainty that she would be able to compete. However, she later participated in the Manchester championship in the UK, where she won a bronze medal in the weight category of up to 46 kg. She also won a silver medal in the World Cup competition held in Sofia.

In January 2023, Bayech won the state championship up to 46 kg. In August 2023, she won a bronze medal in the weight category of up to 49 kg at the European Championships held in Tallinn, Estonia. In April 2024, Bayech won the bronze medal in the World Tour competition in Spa, and gold at the Skopje Open.
