= Josipa Kafadar =

Canadian taekwondo practitioner

Personal information
- Nationality: Canadian
- Born: 2 February 2001 (age 25) Burnaby, British Columbia, Canada
- Home town: Burnaby, British Columbia
- Weight: 49 kg (108 lb)

Sport
- Country: Canada
- Sport: Taekwondo
- Event: –49 kg
Medal record
Women's taekwondo
Representing Canada
World Junior Championships
Silver medal – second place	2018 Hammamet	49 kg
- Updated on 12 May 2024

Josipa Kafadar (born February 2, 2001) is a Canadian taekwondo athlete. Kafadar is a former World Junior medallist and has qualified to compete for Canada at the 2024 Summer Olympics.

== Career ==
Kafadar's first major international result came in 2018, when she won the silver medal at the World Junior Championships in Hammamet, Tunisia. Kafadar lost the gold medal match by one point to Vietnam's Thi Kim Ngan Ho. Kafadar's senior career has seen her win gold medals at the 2023 British and Luxembourg Opens respectively, among other successes.

In January 2024, Kafadar was named to Canada's 2024 Olympic qualification team. Kafadar would go on to qualify for the 2024 Summer Olympics at the Pan American Taekwondo Olympic Qualification Tournament in Santo Domingo, Dominican Republic. Kafadar was officially named to Canada's 2024 Olympic team in April 2024.

== Personal life ==
Kafadar is of Croatian descent and currently a biophysics student at Simon Fraser University.
