= Victoria Stambaugh =

Puerto Rican taekwondo practitioner

Personal information
- Born: 4 May 1993 (age 33) Pasadena, Texas, US

Sport
- Country: Puerto Rico
- Sport: Taekwondo
Medal record
Women's taekwondo
Representing Puerto Rico
Central American and Caribbean Games
Silver medal – second place	2014 Veracruz	49 kg
Bronze medal – third place	2018 Barranquilla	49 kg

Victoria Stambaugh (born 4 May 1993) is a Puerto Rican taekwondo practitioner. She is a two-time medalist at the Central American and Caribbean Games.

She competed in the women's 49 kg event at the 2019 Pan American Games held in Lima, Peru. In 2020, she qualified at the Pan American Olympic Qualification Tournament to compete at the 2020 Summer Olympics in Tokyo, Japan. She competed in the women's 49 kg event where she was eliminated in her first match by Avishag Semberg of Israel 22-2.
