= Rukiye Yıldırım =

Turkish taekwondo practitioner

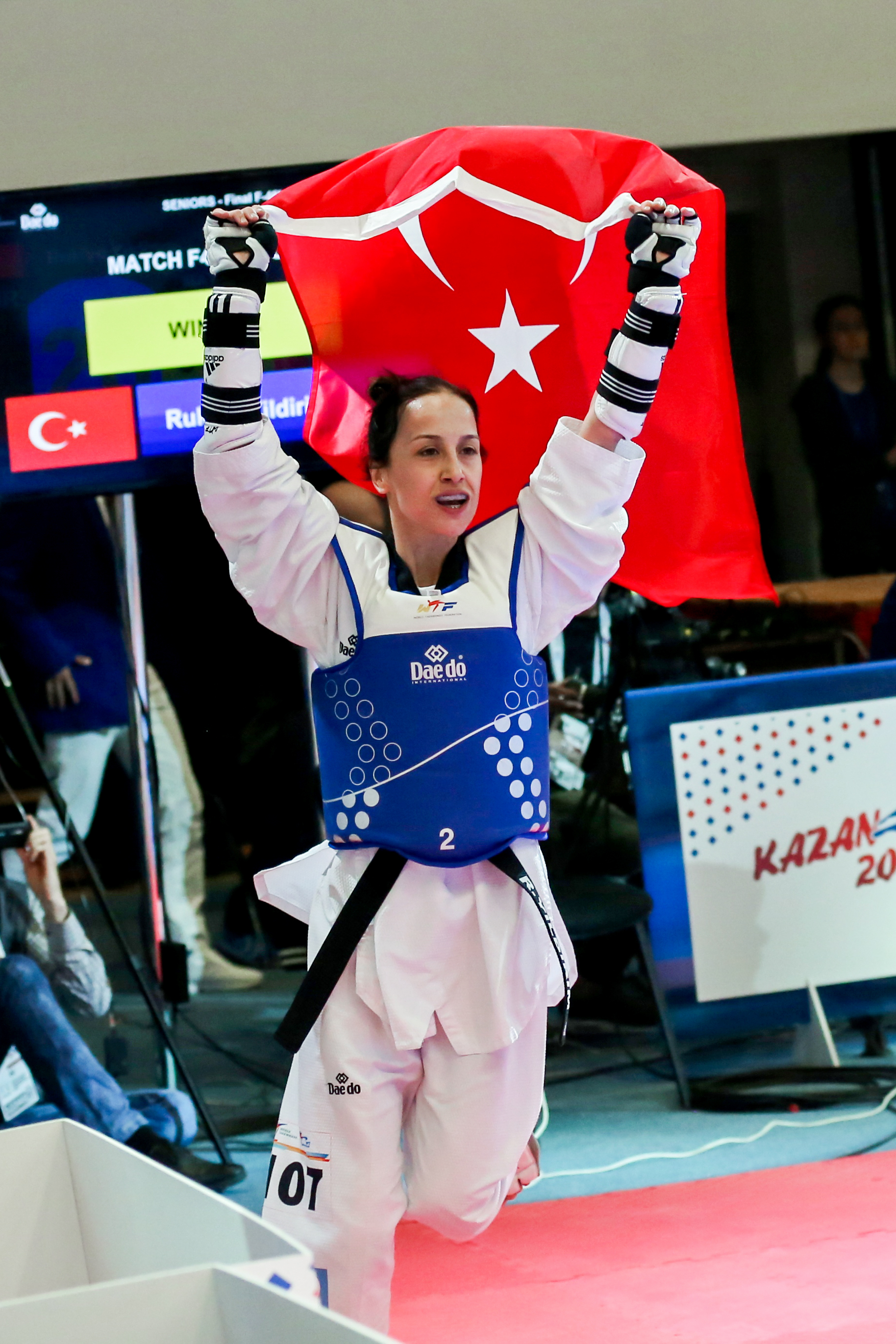

Personal information
- Nationality: Turkish
- Born: February 12, 1991 (age 35) Ankara, Turkey
- Education: Sports science Selçuk University
- Height: 166 cm (5 ft 5 in)
- Weight: 46 kg (101 lb)

Sport
- Country: Turkey
- Sport: Taekwondo
- Event: Finweight (46 kg)
- Club: Ankara İlbank SK
- Coached by: Ali Şahin
Medal record
Women's taekwondo
Representing Turkey
World Championships
Silver medal – second place	2022 Guadalajara	46 kg
Bronze medal – third place	2011 Gyeongju	46 kg
Bronze medal – third place	2019 Manchester	49 kg
European Championships
Gold medal – first place	2010 Petersburg	46 kg
Gold medal – first place	2018 Kazan	46 kg
Bronze medal – third place	2012 Manchester	46 kg
Bronze medal – third place	2016 Montreux	46 kg
Grand Prix
Bronze medal – third place	2015 Moscow	49 kg
Bronze medal – third place	2017 London	49 kg
Bronze medal – third place	2017 Rabat	49 kg
Bronze medal – third place	2018 Taoyuan	49 kg
Bronze medal – third place	2019 Moscow	49 kg
Islamic Solidarity Games
Gold medal – first place	2017 Baku	46 kg
Gold medal – first place	2021 Konya	49 kg
Mediterranean Games
Gold medal – first place	2018 Tarragona	49 kg
Silver medal – second place	2013 Mersin	49 kg
Universiade
Silver medal – second place	2011 Shenzhen	46 kg

Rukiye Yıldırım (born February 12, 1991, in Ankara) is a European champion Turkish taekwondo practitioner competing in the finweight division. She is a graduate student in the School of Sports science at Selçuk University in Konya.

She began with Taekwondo in 2002 in Kanka Taekwondo S.K. in Ankara, where she is coached by Hızır Pınaroğlu. She is representing her country at international events since 2007.

Rukiye Yıldırım won a bronze medal at the 2011 World Taekwondo Championships held in Gyeongju, South Korea. She is the gold medalist of 2010 European Taekwondo Championships in finweigth.

She won the silver medalist in the Flyweight (49kg) division at the 2013 Mediterranean Games held in Mersin, Turkey.
