= Bernardo Pié =

Dominican taekwondo athlete

Personal information
- Born: 28 April 1995 (age 31) Bayaguana, Dominican Republic

Sport
- Sport: Taekwondo
Medal record
Representing Dominican Republic
Men's taekwondo
Pan American Games
Silver medal – second place	2019 Lima	Men's -68kg
Silver medal – second place	2023 Santiago	Men's -68kg
Pan American Championships
Gold medal – first place	2018 Spokane	Men's -63kg
Gold medal – first place	2022 Punta Cana	Men's -68kg
Silver medal – second place	2014 Aguascalientes	Men's -63kg
Silver medal – second place	2024 Rio de Janeiro	Men's -68kg
Central American and Caribbean Games
Gold medal – first place	2026 Santo Domingo	Men's -74kg

Bernardo Pié (born 28 April 1995) is a Taekwondo athlete from Dominican Republic.

== Career ==
He won one medal at the 2019 Pan American Games, and three medals at the Pan American Taekwondo Championships between 2014 and 2018.

He was selected to compete in Taekwondo at the 2020 Summer Olympics – Men's 68 kg, where he made it through to the semi-finals.

== Personal life ==
His older brother Luisito Pié is also a professional Taekwondo athlete.
