= Madelyn Rodríguez =

Dominican Republic taekwondo athlete

Personal information
- Full name: Madelyn Andrea Rodríguez Rosario
- Nationality: Dominican
- Born: 26 March 2000 (age 26) Santiago de los Caballeros, Santiago
- Height: 177 cm (5 ft 10 in)
- Weight: 67 kg (148 lb)

Sport
- Sport: Taekwondo
Medal record
Women's taekwondo
Representing the Dominican Republic
Pan American Games
Gold medal – first place	2023 Santiago	Team

Madelyn Andrea Rodríguez Rosario (born 26 March 2000) is a Dominican Republic taekwondo athlete. She became 2023 Pan American Games champion in the Kyorugi team competition.

== Career ==
=== 2023 ===
Rodríguez represented her home country at the taekwondo competition, she lost 1–2 to Mexican Itzel Velázquez in the -67 kg category in the round of 16. She won the Kyorugi team competition gold medal with Mayerlin Mejía and Katherine Rodríguez.
