= Arlettys Acosta =

Cuban taekwondo practitioner

Personal information
- Full name: Arlettys de la Caridad Acosta Herrera
- Born: 25 October 1999 (age 26)

Sport
- Country: Cuba
- Sport: Taekwondo
- Weight class: 67 kg
Medal record
Women's taekwondo
Representing Cuba
Central American and Caribbean Games
Gold medal – first place	2018 Barranquilla	67 kg
Pan American Games
Bronze medal – third place	2019 Lima	67 kg
Bronze medal – third place	2023 Santiago	Team

Arlettys de la Caridad Acosta Herrera (born 25 October 1999) is a Cuban taekwondo practitioner. She won the gold medal in the women's 67 kg event at the 2018 Central American and Caribbean Games held in Barranquilla, Colombia.

In 2019, Acosta won one of the bronze medals in the women's 67 kg event at the Pan American Games held in Lima, Peru. In 2020, she competed at the Pan American Olympic Qualification Tournament where she finished in 3rd place and she did not qualify to compete at the 2020 Summer Olympics in Tokyo, Japan.

In 2022, Acosta competed in the women's lightweight event at the World Taekwondo Championships held in Guadalajara, Mexico.
