= Moisés Hernández (taekwondo) =

Dominican Republic taekwondo athlete

Personal information
- Nationality: Dominican
- Born: 22 March 1993 (age 33) San Juan, Dominican Republic
- Height: 192 cm (6 ft 4 in)

Sport
- Sport: Taekwondo
Medal record
Men's taekwondo
Representing Dominican Republic
World Championships
Bronze medal – third place	2019 Manchester	Welterweight
Pan American Games
Silver medal – second place	2023 Santiago	80 kg
Bronze medal – third place	2019 Lima	80 kg
Central American and Caribbean Games
Bronze medal – third place	2026 Santo Domingo	+87 kg

Moisés Hernández Encarnación (born 22 March 1993) is a Dominican Republic taekwondo athlete.

He represented his country at the 2016 Summer Olympics in Rio de Janeiro, in the men's 80 kg.

He represented the Dominican Republic at the 2020 Summer Olympics.
