= Pan American Taekwondo Championships =

Taekwondo competition

- Current event or competition: 2026 Pan American Taekwondo Championships

Competition details
- Discipline: Taekwondo
- Type: kyourugui, biennial
- Organiser: Pan American Taekwondo Union (PATU)

History
- First edition: 1978 in Mexico City, Mexico
- Editions: 20 (2018)

Pan American Taekwondo Championships or simply Pan Am Taekwondo Championships are the American taekwondo senior championships, first held in 1978 in Mexico City. The event is held every two years by the Pan American Taekwondo Union and it's considered by the World Taekwondo as the continental tournament and a Grade 4 tournament for the world and olympic rankings.

The championships should not be confused with:

- the Pan American Games taekwondo competitions, which form part of a continental multi-sport event in the Olympic tradition.
- the ITF Pan American Taekwondo Championships, a championships organised by the International Taekwondo Federation.

== List of tournaments ==
Number	Edition	Host city and country	Men's champion	Women's champion	Events
1	1978	Mexico City, Mexico	Mexico	—N/a	8
2	1982	Ponce, Puerto Rico	United States	United States	16
3	1984	Paramaribo, Suriname	United States	—N/a	8
4	1986	Guayaquil, Ecuador	United States	United States	16
5	1988	Lima, Peru	Canada	United States	16
6	1990	Bayamón, Puerto Rico	Canada	United States	16
7	1992	Colorado Springs, United States	Mexico	Mexico	16
8	1994	Heredia, Costa Rica	Mexico	Mexico	16
9	1996	Havana, Cuba	Cuba	United States	16
10	1998	Lima, Peru	Mexico	United States	16
11	2000	Oranjestad, Aruba	United States	United States	16
12	2002	Quito, Ecuador	Mexico	United States	16
13	2004	Santo Domingo, Dominican Republic	Mexico	United States	16
14	2006	Buenos Aires, Argentina	Mexico	Canada	16
15	2008	Caguas, Puerto Rico	Argentina	Canada	16
16	2010	Monterrey, Mexico	Mexico	Mexico	16
17	2012	Sucre, Bolivia	United States	United States	16
18	2014	Aguascalientes, Mexico	Mexico	Canada	16
19	2016	Queretaro, Mexico	Mexico	Mexico	16
20	2018	Spokane, United States	Mexico	Brazil	16
21	2021	Cancún, Mexico	Mexico	Brazil	16
22	2022	Punta Cana, Dominican Republic	Brazil	Brazil	16
23	2024	Rio de Janeiro, Brazil	Canada	United States	16
24	2026	Rio de Janeiro, Brazil			16

== Medal table ==
After 2026 edition.

Rank	Nation	Gold	Silver	Bronze	Total
1	United States	91	59	88	238
2	Mexico	81	56	68	205
3	Canada	50	35	88	173
4	Brazil	41	50	75	166
5	Cuba	20	8	18	46
6	Venezuela	18	13	42	73
7	Dominican Republic	12	29	35	76
8	Colombia	12	28	45	85
9	Argentina	11	15	38	64
10	Puerto Rico	7	20	57	84
11	Ecuador	5	10	32	47
12	Chile	5	8	28	41
13	Peru	4	3	18	25
14	Netherlands Antilles	3	2	9	14
15	Costa Rica	2	12	16	30
16	Guatemala	2	10	13	25
17	U.S. Virgin Islands	2	1	9	12
18	Panama	2	1	3	6
19	Suriname	1	3	4	8
20	Nicaragua	1	0	1	2
21	Trinidad and Tobago	0	2	1	3
22	Uruguay	0	1	5	6
23	El Salvador	0	1	2	3
23	Jamaica	0	1	2	3
25	Haiti	0	1	1	2
26	Paraguay	0	1	0	1
27	Honduras	0	0	8	8
28	Aruba	0	0	5	5
29	Bolivia	0	0	4	4
30	Grenada	0	0	1	1
30	Guadeloupe	0	0	1	1
30	Guyana	0	0	1	1
Totals (32 entries)		370	370	718	1,458

== See also ==
- Pan American Junior Taekwondo Championships
