= 2024 in combat sports =

2024 in combat sports describes the year's events in combat sports.

== Beach wrestling ==
- United World Wrestling Calendar

=== World and Continental Championships ===
- June 16: 2024 U15 Pan-American Beach Wrestling Championships in (El Salvador) San Salvador
- June 22–23: 2024 Seniors Beach Wrestling African Championships in (Senegal) Dakar
- June 23: 2024 U23 Pan-American Beach Wrestling Championships in (Colombia) Rionegro
- June 30: 2024 U17 Pan-American Beach Wrestling Championships in (Dominican Republic) Santo Domingo
- July 14: 2024 U20 Pan-American Beach Wrestling Championships in (Peru) Lima
- July 18–19: 2024 U15, U17 And U20 Beach Wrestling European Championships in (Romania) Timisoara
- September 2–8: 2024 FISU World University Championships Beach Sports in (Brazil) Rio de Janeiro
- September 19–20: 2024 U17 And U20 Beach Wrestling World Championships in (Greece) Katerini

=== Beach Wrestling World Series ===
- March 2–3: Acapulco Beach Wrestling World Series in (Mexico) Acapulco
- June 28–29: St-Laurent-Du-Var Beach Wrestling World Series in (France) Saint-Laurent-du-Var
- July 20–21: Timisoara Beach Wrestling World Series in (Romania) Timisoara
- September 21–22: Katerini Beach Wrestling World Series in (Greece) Katerini
- October 12–13: Beach Wrestling World Series FINAL in (Croatia) Poreč

=== International Tournaments ===
- June 16: Sardinia Beach Wrestling in (Italy) Sassari
- July 2–7: East Africa Wrestling Championship in (Kenya) Nairobi
- December 7–8: Intuthuko in (South Africa) Pretoria

== Boxing ==
=== Amateur boxing ===
==== World and Continental Championships ====
- April 2–15: 2024 European Youth Boxing Championships (U19) in (Croatia) Poreč
- April 15–29: 2024 European Amateur Boxing Championships in (Serbia) Belgrade
- June 21 – July 3: 2024 European Junior Boxing Championships (U17) in (Bosnia and Herzegovina) Sarajevo
- July 1: 2024 European School Boxing Championships (U15) in (Italy) Assisi
- October 10–21: 2024 European U22 Boxing Championships in (Bulgaria) Sofia
- November 10–20: 2024 EUBC Balkans Elite, Youth and Junior Boxing Championships in (North Macedonia) Skopje
- 2024 Men's Senior Master World Boxing Championships in (Japan) Yokohama

==== World Boxing International Tournaments ====
January 17–20: World Boxing Cup: GB Open in (United Kingdom) Sheffield

- Men's 51A kg: (Wales) Scott Richards
- Men's 51 kg: (England) Kiaran MacDonald
- Men's 57 kg: (Wales) Owain Harris-Allan
- Men's 63.5 kg: (England) Patris Mughalzai
- Men's 71 kg: (Denmark) Nikolai Terteryan
- Men's 80 kg: (England) Ramtin Musah
- Men's 92 kg: (England) Patrick Brown
- Men's 92+kg: (Germany) Nikita Putilov
- Women's 50 kg: (England) Savannah Stubley
- Women's 54A kg: (Denmark) Melissa Mortensen
- Women's 54 kg: (England) Lauren Mackie
- Women's 57 kg: (Netherlands) Maud van der Toorn
- Women's 60 kg: (England) Shona Whitwell
- Women's 66 kg: (England) Dione Burman
- Women's 75 kg: (Athlete Refugee Team) Cindy Ngamba

==== EUBC International Tournaments ====
- January 14–21: 13th Nations Cup - Women in (Serbia) Sombor
- January 14–22: 68th Bocskai Memorial Tournament in (Hungary) Debrecen
- January 29 – February 4: BOXAM International Tournament in (Spain) La Nucia
- February 2–12: 75th International Boxing Tournament STRANDJA in (Bulgaria) Sofia
- February 11–19: Dracula Open in (Romania) Ploiești
- February 12–17: “Olympic Dreamer” Elite Men and Women International Boxing Tournament in (Bosnia and Herzegovina) Sarajevo
- February 18–25: International Boxing Tournament «Memory of the Russian Soldiers victims in Afghanistan and other flashpoints» in (Russia) Komsomolsk-on-Amur
- March 3–11: Youth World Boxing Cup "33rd Adriatic Pearl" in (Montenegro) Budva
- March 7–11: 5th Riga Women's Boxing Cup 2024 in (Latvia) Riga
- March 12–17: 61st Belgrade Winner in (Serbia) Belgrade
- March 13–16: 19th Danas Pozniakas Youth Boxing Tournament in (Lithuania) Vilnius
- March 20–24: 28th Algirdas Šocikas International Boxing Tournament in (Lithuania) Kaunas
- March 23–29: Great Silk Way International Boxing Tournament in (Azerbaijan) Baku
- March 24–30: Oil Countries Boxing Cup in (Russia) Nizhnevartovsk
- March 28–31: HBF Intention Eupatoriada Tournament in (Greece) Thessaloniki
- April 22–27: International Tournament named after V.Batvinnik in (Belarus) Minsk

== Fencing ==
- 2023/2024 FIE Calendar

=== Olympic Games ===
- July 27 – August 4: 2024 Summer Olympics in (France) Paris

=== World Championships ===
- April 12–20: 2024 World Cadets and Juniors Fencing Championships in (Saudi Arabia) Riyadh
  - Cadets
    - Individual Épée winners: (Turkey) Doruk Erolcevik (m) / (Ukraine) Anna Maksymenko (w)
    - Individual Foil winners: (China) Lyu Weiqiao (m) / (United States) Liu Jaelyn (w)
    - Individual Sabre winners: (Uzbekistan) Sardor Abdukarimbekov (m) / (Hungary) Dorottya Csonka (w)
  - Juniors
    - Individual Épée winners: (Switzerland) Alban Aebersold (m) / (France) Océane Francillonne (w)
    - Individual Foil winners: (Japan) Ryosuke Fukuda (m) / (Canada) Jessica Zi Jia Guo (w)
    - Individual Sabre winners: (Romania) Vlad Covaliu (m) / (China) Pan Qimiao (w)
- November 11–17: 2024 World Veterans Fencing Championships in (United Arab Emirates) Dubai

=== Continental Championships ===
==== Senior ====
- June 6–10: 2024 African Fencing Championships in (Morocco) Casablanca
- June 18–23: 2024 European Fencing Championships in (Switzerland) Basel
- June 22–27: 2024 Pan American Fencing Championships in (El Salvador) San Salvador
- June 22–27: 2024 Asian Fencing Championships in Kuwait City

==== Junior ====
- February 21–24: 2024 Asian Juniors Fencing Championships in (Bahrain) Manama

- Individual Épée winners: (South Korea) Kim Jung-beom (m) / (Japan) Rin Kishimoto (w)
- Individual Foil winners: (China) Guo Yifan (m) / (Japan) Yukari Takamizawa (w)
- Individual Sabre winners: (Uzbekistan) Musa Aymuratov (m) / (Australia) Zou Yelin (w)

- February 24–27: 2024 Pan American Juniors Fencing Championships in (Brazil) Rio de Janeiro

- Individual Épée winners: (United States) Samuel Imrek (m) / (United States) Leehi Machulsky (w)
- Individual Foil winners: (United States Virgin Islands) Kruz Schembri (m) / (United States) Victoria Pevzner (w)
- Individual Sabre winners: (United States) Silas Choi (m) / (Puerto Rico) Gabriela Maria Hwang (w)

- February 26–29: 2024 European Juniors Fencing Championships in (Italy) Naples

- Individual Épée winners: (Israel) Dov Ber Vilensky (m) / (Ukraine) Anna Maksymenko (w)
- Individual Foil winners: (Italy) Matteo Iacomoni (m) / (United Kingdom) Carolina Stutchbury (w)
- Individual Sabre winners: (France) Rémi Garrigue (m) / (Bulgaria) Emma Neikova (w)

- March 4–6: 2024 African Juniors Fencing Championships in (Egypt) Cairo

- Individual Épée winners: (Egypt) Mohamed Yasseen (m) / (Egypt) Salma Tarek (w)
- Individual Foil winners: (Egypt) Abdelrahman Tolba (m) / (Senegal) Safietou Inna Namiya Coly (w)
- Individual Sabre winners: (Egypt) Ahmed Hesham (m) / (Egypt) Renad Adel Eldoksh (w)

=== 2023–24 Fencing World Cup ===
- November 9–12, 2023: WC #1 in (Algeria) Algiers

- Men's Sabre winner: (France) Boladé Apithy
- Women's Sabre winner: (France) Sara Balzer
- Men's Team Sabre winners: United States
- Women's Team Sabre winners: South Korea

- November 10–12, 2023: WC #2 in (Switzerland) Bern

- Men's Épée winner: (Switzerland) Lucas Malcotti
- Men's Team Épée winners: France

- November 10–12, 2023: WC #3 in (Italy) Legnano

- Women's Épée winner: (United States) Margherita Guzzi Vincenti
- Women's Team Épée winners: Ukraine

- November 10–12, 2023: WC #4 in (Turkey) Istanbul

- Men's Foil winner: (United States) Alexander Massialas
- Men's Team Foil winners: Italy

- December 7–10: WC #5 in (France) Orléans

- Men's Sabre winner: (Germany) Matyas Szabo
- Women's Sabre winner: (France) Manon Brunet

- December 7–10: WC #6 in (Canada) Vancouver

- Men's Épée winner: (France) Luidgi Midelton
- Women's Épée winner: (France) Coraline Vitalis
- Men's Team Épée winners: Japan
- Women's Team Épée winners: Estonia

- December 8–10: WC #7 in (Japan) Tokoname

- Men's Foil winner: (United States) Alexander Massialas
- Men's Team Foil winners: France

- December 8–10: WC #8 in (Serbia) Novi Sad

- Women's Foil winner: (Italy) Alice Volpi
- Women's Team Foil winners: United States

- January 11–14: WC #9 in (France) Paris

- Men's Foil winner: (Italy) Tommaso Marini
- Men's Team Foil winners: United States
- Women's Foil winner: (China) Chen Qingyuan
- Women's Team Foil winners: Italy

- January 12–14: WC #10 in (Tunisia) Tunis

- Men's Sabre winner: (United States) Colin Heathcock
- Women's Sabre winner: (Spain) Lucia Martin-Portugues

- January 29–31: WC #11 in (Qatar) Doha

- Men's Épée winner: (Israel) Yuval Freilich
- Women's Épée winner: (Hong Kong) Vivian Kong

- February 9–11: WC #12 in (Georgia (country)) Tbilisi

- Men's Sabre winner: (Hungary) Áron Szilágyi
- Men's Team Sabre winners: South Korea

- February 9–11: WC #13 in (Spain) Barcelona

- Women's Épée winner: (Hong Kong) Vivian Kong
- Women's Team Épée winners: Italy

- February 9–11: WC #14 in (Italy) Turin

- Men's Foil winner: (Hong Kong) Cheung Ka Long
- Women's Foil winner: (United States) Lee Kiefer

- February 9–11: WC #15 in (Peru) Lima

- Women's Sabre winner: (Ukraine) Olga Kharlan
- Women's Team Sabre winners: France

- February 22–24: WC #16 in (Germany) Heidenheim an der Brenz

- Men's Épée winner: (Japan) Masaru Yamada
- Men's Team Épée winners: Hungary

- February 22–25: WC #17 in (Egypt) Cairo

- Men's Foil winner: (Italy) Tommaso Marini
- Women's Foil winner: (Italy) Martina Favaretto
- Men's Team Foil winner: Italy
- Women's Team Foil winner: United States

- March 1–3: WC #18 in (Italy) Padua

- Men's Sabre winner: (United States) Colin Heathcock
- Men's Team Sabre winner: South Korea

- March 1–3: WC #19 in (Greece) Athens

- Women's Sabre winner: (France) Sara Balzer
- Women's Team Sabre winner: France

- March 8–10: WC #20 in (Hungary) Budapest

- Men's Épée winner: (France) Yannick Borel
- Women's Épée winner: (Hungary) Anna Kun

- March 15–17: WC #21 in (United States) Washington, D.C.

- Men's Foil winner: (United States) Nick Itkin
- Women's Foil winner: (United States) Lee Kiefer

- March 15–17: WC #22 in (Belgium) Sint-Niklaas

- Women's Sabre winner: (France) Sara Balzer
- Women's Team Sabre winner: France

- March 22–24: WC #23 in (China) Nanjing

- Women's Épée winner: (Italy) Giulia Rizzi
- Women's Team Épée winner: Italy

- March 22–24: WC #24 in (Argentina) Buenos Aires
- March 22–24: WC #25 in (Hungary) Budapest

- Men's Sabre winner: (Hungary) András Szatmári
- Men's Team Sabre winner: United States

- April 19–21: WC #26 in Hong Kong

- Men's Foik winner: (Italy) Guillaume Bianchi
- Women's Foil winner: (United States) Maia Mei Weintraub
- Men's Team Foil winner: Hong Kong
- Women's Team Foil winner: Italy

- May 3–5: WC #27 in (Colombia) Cali

- Men's Épée winner: (Japan) Koki Kano
- Women's Épée winner: (France) Auriane Mallo

- May 3–5: WC #28 in (Mexico) Acapulco
- May 3–5: WC #29 in (South Korea) Seoul

- Men's Sabre winner: (Egypt) Ziad Elsissy
- Women's Sabre winner: (Spain) Araceli Navarro

- May 17–18: WC #30 in (France) Saint-Maur-des-Fossés
- May 17–19: WC #31 in (China) Shanghai

- Men's Foil winner: (Hong Kong) Cheung Ka Long
- Women's Foil winner: (Italy) Martina Favaretto

- May 17–19: WC #32 in (United Arab Emirates) Fujairah

- Men's Épée winner: (Hong Kong) Vivian Kong
- Men's Team Épée winner: South Korea

- May 17–19: WC #33 in (Bulgaria) Plovdiv

- Women's Sabre winner: (France) Sara Balzer
- Women's Team Sabre winner: Ukraine

- May 17–19: WC #34 in (Spain) Madrid

- Women's Sabre winner: (France) Sébastien Patrice
- Women's Team Sabre winner: United States

=== Satellite tournaments ===
- September 2–3, 2023: ST in (Brazil) São Paulo
- September 9–10, 2023: ST in Singapore
- September 10, 2023: ST in (Iran) Isfahan
- September 17, 2023: ST in (Mexico) Monterrey
- September 23–24, 2023: ST in (Bulgaria) Sofia
- September 23–24, 2023: ST in (Romania) Timișoara
- September 24, 2023: ST in (Serbia) Belgrade
- September 30 – October 1, 2023: ST in (Switzerland) Geneva
- September 30 – October 1, 2023: ST in (Netherlands) Amsterdam
- October 1, 2023: ST in (Belgium) Gand
- October 7, 2023: ST in Kuwait City
- October 7–8, 2023: ST in (Peru) Lima
- October 14–15, 2023: ST in (Croatia) Split
- October 14, 2023: ST in (Georgia (country)) Tbilisi
- October 14–15, 2023: ST in (Uzbekistan) Tashkent
- October 21, 2023: ST in (Croatia) Zagreb
- October 21–22, 2023: ST in (Turkey) Istanbul
- October 28, 2023: ST in (Spain) Barcelona
- October 29, 2023: ST in (Iraq) Baghdad

=== Olympic Qualification Tournaments ===
- April 5–7: Zonal Qualifying Tournament – America in (Costa Rica) San José
- April 26–28: Zonal Qualifying Tournament – Europe in (Luxembourg) Differdange
- April 27: Zonal Qualifying Tournament – Africa in (Algeria) Algiers
- April 27–28: Zonal Qualifying Tournament – Asia and Oceania in (United Arab Emirates) Dubai

== Grappling ==
- United World Wrestling Calendar

=== World and Continental Championships ===
- May 4–6: 2024 Senior, U20, U17, U15 and Veteran Asian Grappling Championships in (Philippines) Tagaytay
- May 11–12: 2024 U15 European Grappling Championships in (Greece) Loutraki
- May 27–30: 2024 Senior, U20 and U17 European Grappling Championships in (Azerbaijan) Baku
- June 15–16: 2024 Senior Pan-American Grappling Championships in (Venezuela) Miranda
- October 7–12: 2024 Senior, U20, U17, U15 and Veteran World Grappling Championships in (Kazakhstan) Astana

== Judo ==
- 2024 IJF Calendar

=== Olympic Games ===
- July 27 – August 3: 2024 Summer Olympics in (France) Paris

- Men's 60 kg: (Kazakhstan) Yeldos Smetov
- Men's 66 kg: (Japan) Hifumi Abe
- Men's 73 kg: (Azerbaijan) Hidayat Heydarov
- Men's 81 kg: (Japan) Takanori Nagase
- Men's 90 kg: (Georgia (country)) Lasha Bekauri
- Men's 100 kg: (Azerbaijan) Zelym Kotsoiev
- Men's +100 kg: (France) Teddy Riner
- Mixed team: France

- Women's 48 kg: (Japan) Natsumi Tsunoda
- Women's 52 kg: (Uzbekistan) Diyora Keldiyorova
- Women's 57 kg: (Canada) Christa Deguchi
- Women's 63 kg: (Slovenia) Andreja Leški
- Women's 70 kg: (Croatia) Barbara Matić
- Women's 78 kg: (Italy) Alice Bellandi
- Women's +78 kg: (Brazil) Beatriz Souza

=== World Championships ===
- May 19–24: 2024 World Judo Championships in (United Arab Emirates) Abu Dhabi
- August 28 – September 1: 2024 World Judo Cadets Championships in (Peru) Lima

- Men's 50 kg: Aleksei Toptygin
- Men's 55 kg: (Azerbaijan) Nihad Mamishov
- Men's 60 kg: (United States) Jonathan Yang
- Men's 66 kg: (Georgia (country)) Giorgi Givishvili
- Men's 73 kg: (Azerbaijan) Jasur Ibadli
- Men's 81 kg: Abu-Bakr Kantaev
- Men's 90 kg: (Kazakhstan) Sanzhar Yerulanuly
- Men's +90 kg: Rustem Kadzaev
- Mixed team: Japan

- Women's 40 kg: (Spain) Aiora Martin Carriches
- Women's 44 kg: (Slovakia) Patrícia Tománková
- Women's 48 kg: (Brazil) Clarice Ribeiro
- Women's 52 kg: (Japan) Iroha Oi
- Women's 57 kg: (Mongolia) Terbishiin Ariunzayaa
- Women's 63 kg: (Japan) Honoka Kimura
- Women's 70 kg: (France) Lucie Rullier
- Women's +70 kg: (Poland) Zuzanna Banaszewska

- October 2–6: 2024 World Judo Juniors Championships in (Tajikistan) Dushanbe
- November 4–7: 2024 World Judo Veterans Championships in (United States) Las Vegas
- November 9–10: 2024 World Kata Championships in (United States) Las Vegas

=== Continental Championships ===
==== Area Games ====
- March 12–15: 2023 African Games in (Ghana) Accra

- Men's 60 kg: (Authorised Neutral Athletes) Leonardo Barros
- Men's 66 kg: (Zambia) Steven Mungandu
- Men's 73 kg: (Tunisia) Aleddine Ben Chalbi
- Men's 81 kg: (Egypt) Abdelrahman Mohamed
- Men's 90 kg: (Tunisia) Abdelaziz Ben Ammar
- Men's 100 kg: (Tunisia) Koussay Ben Ghares
- Men's +100 kg: (Algeria) Mohamed El Mehdi Lili
- Mixed team: Tunisia

- Women's 48 kg: (Tunisia) Oumaima Bedioui
- Women's 52 kg: (Tunisia) Rahma Tibi
- Women's 57 kg: (South Africa) Jasmine Martin
- Women's 63 kg: (Algeria) Amina Belkadi
- Women's 70 kg: (Madagascar) Aina Laura Rasoanaivo Razafy
- Women's 78 kg: (Guinea) Marie Branser
- Women's +78 kg: (Senegal) Monica Sagna

==== Senior ====
- April 20–23: 2024 Asian Judo Championships in Hong Kong

- Men's 60 kg: (Japan) Taiki Nakamura
- Men's 66 kg: (Mongolia) Mattogtokhyn Erkhembayar
- Men's 73 kg: (Japan) Tatsuki Ishihara
- Men's 81 kg: (South Korea) Lee Joon-hwan
- Men's 90 kg: (Japan) Sanshiro Murao
- Men's 100 kg: (Uzbekistan) Muzaffarbek Turoboyev
- Men's +100 kg: (Japan) Hyōga Ōta
- Mixed team: Japan

- Women's 48 kg: (Mongolia) Bavuudorjiin Baasankhüü
- Women's 52 kg: (United Arab Emirates) Bishreltiin Khorloodoi
- Women's 57 kg: (Mongolia) Lkhagvatogoogiin Enkhriilen
- Women's 63 kg: (Japan) Kirari Yamaguchi
- Women's 70 kg: (Japan) Saki Niizoe
- Women's 78 kg: (Japan) Rika Takayama
- Women's +78 kg: (South Korea) Lee Hyeon-ji

- April 25–28: 2024 Pan American-Oceania Judo Championships in (Brazil) Rio de Janeiro

- Men's 60 kg: (Brazil) Michel Augusto
- Men's 66 kg: (Brazil) Willian Lima
- Men's 73 kg: (Canada) Arthur Margelidon
- Men's 81 kg: (Brazil) Guilherme Schimidt
- Men's 90 kg: (Dominican Republic) Robert Florentino
- Men's 100 kg: (Canada) Shady El Nahas
- Men's +100 kg: (Cuba) Andy Granda
- Mixed team: Brazil

- Women's 48 kg: (Chile) Mary Dee Vargas
- Women's 52 kg: (Brazil) Larissa Pimenta
- Women's 57 kg: (Brazil) Rafaela Silva
- Women's 63 kg: (Australia) Katharina Haecker
- Women's 70 kg: (Puerto Rico) María Pérez
- Women's 78 kg: (Dominican Republic) Eiraima Silvestre
- Women's +78 kg: (Brazil) Beatriz Souza

- April 25–28: 2024 European Judo Championships in (Croatia) Zagreb

- Men's 60 kg: (Spain) Francisco Garrigós
- Men's 66 kg: (Georgia (country)) Vazha Margvelashvili
- Men's 73 kg: (Azerbaijan) Hidayat Heydarov
- Men's 81 kg: (Georgia (country)) Tato Grigalashvili
- Men's 90 kg: (Azerbaijan) Eljan Hajiyev
- Men's 100 kg: Matvey Kanikovskiy
- Men's +100 kg: Inal Tasoev
- Mixed team: France

- Women's 48 kg: Kristina Dudina
- Women's 52 kg: (Kosovo) Distria Krasniqi
- Women's 57 kg: (Ukraine) Daria Bilodid
- Women's 63 kg: (Czech Republic) Renata Zachová
- Women's 70 kg: (Croatia) Barbara Matić
- Women's 78 kg: (France) Audrey Tcheuméo
- Women's +78 kg: (Israel) Raz Hershko

- April 25–28: 2024 African Judo Championships in (Egypt) Cairo

- Men's 60 kg: (Morocco) Younes Saddiki
- Men's 66 kg: (Algeria) Kais Moudetere
- Men's 73 kg: (Algeria) Messaoud Dris
- Men's 81 kg: (Egypt) Abdelrahman Mohamed
- Men's 90 kg: (Egypt) Ali Hazem
- Men's 100 kg: (Tunisia) Koussay Ben Ghares
- Men's +100 kg: (Egypt) Mohamed Aborakia
- Mixed team: Egypt

- Women's 48 kg: (Tunisia) Oumaima Bedioui
- Women's 52 kg: (Morocco) Soumiya Iraoui
- Women's 57 kg: (Guinea) Mariana Esteves
- Women's 63 kg: (Algeria) Amina Belkadi
- Women's 70 kg: (Angola) Maria Niangi
- Women's 78 kg: (Guinea) Marie Branser
- Women's +78 kg: (Cameroon) Richelle Anita Soppi Mbella

==== Junior ====
- April 23–24: 2024 Pan American-Oceania Junior Judo Championships in (Brazil) Rio de Janeiro

- Men's 60 kg: (United States) Christopher Velazco
- Men's 66 kg: (Brazil) Iago Santos de Oliveira
- Men's 73 kg: (Brazil) Guilherme de Oliveira
- Men's 81 kg: (United States) Dominic Rodriguez
- Men's 90 kg: (United States) Oleksandr Nyzhnyk
- Men's 100 kg: (United States) Daniel Liubimovski
- Men's +100 kg: (Canada) John Messe A Bessong jr.

- Women's 48 kg: (Brazil) Clarice Ribeiro
- Women's 52 kg: (Brazil) Rafaela Rodrigues
- Women's 57 kg: (Brazil) Julia Henriques
- Women's 63 kg: (United States) Emily Daniela Jaspe
- Women's 70 kg: (Brazil) Kaillany Cardoso
- Women's 78 kg: (Brazil) Dandara Camilo
- Women's +78 kg: (Brazil) Evellyn Vitoria Das Chagas Pereira

- July 20–21: 2024 African Junior Judo Championships in (Cameroon) Yaounde
- August 31 – September 1: 2024 Asian Junior Judo Championships in (South Korea) Mungyeong
- September 5–8: 2024 European Junior Judo Championships in (Estonia) Tallinn

==== Cadets ====
- April 22–24: 2024 Pan American-Oceania Cadet Judo Championships in (Brazil) Rio de Janeiro
- June 27–30: 2024 European Cadet Judo Championships in (Bulgaria) Sofia

- Men's 50 kg: (Azerbaijan) Bahadir Feyzullayev
- Men's 55 kg: Magomed Abdulaev
- Men's 60 kg: (Israel) Izhak Ashpiz
- Men's 66 kg: Abdullakh Parchiev
- Men's 73 kg: (Serbia) Bogdan Veličković
- Men's 81 kg: Abu-Bakr Kantaev
- Men's 90 kg: (Ukraine) Dmytro Lebid
- Men's +90 kg: (Estonia) Marek-Adrian Mäsak
- Mixed team: France

- Women's 40 kg: (Spain) Aiora Martin Carriches
- Women's 44 kg: (Slovakia) Patrícia Tománková
- Women's 48 kg: (Germany) Charlotte Nettesheim
- Women's 52 kg: Valeriia Kozlova
- Women's 57 kg: (Germany) Maya Toszegi
- Women's 63 kg: (Poland) Amelia Ptasińska
- Women's 70 kg: (Serbia) Aleksandra Andrić
- Women's +70 kg: (Poland) Zuzanna Banaszewska

- July 18–19: 2024 African Cadet Judo Championships in (Cameroon) Yaounde
- August 29–30: 2024 Asian Cadet Judo Championships in (South Korea) Mungyeong

==== Under 23 ====
- November 15–17: 2024 European U23 Judo Championships in (Poland) Piła

==== Veterans ====
- June 6–9: 2024 European Veterans Judo Championships in (Bosnia and Herzegovina) Sarajevo

=== 2024 IJF World Tour ===
==== Grand Slam ====
- February 2–4: 2024 Judo Grand Slam Paris in (France) Paris

- Men's 60 kg: (France) Luka Mkheidze
- Men's 66 kg: (Japan) Takeshi Takeoka
- Men's 73 kg: (Japan) Tatsuki Ishihara
- Men's 81 kg: (Belgium) Matthias Casse
- Men's 90 kg: (Turkey) Mihael Žgank
- Men's 100 kg: (Japan) Aaron Wolf
- Men's +100 kg: (France) Teddy Riner

- Women's 48 kg: (France) Shirine Boukli
- Women's 52 kg: (Kosovo) Distria Krasniqi
- Women's 57 kg: (France) Faïza Mokdar
- Women's 63 kg: (France) Clarisse Agbegnenou
- Women's 70 kg: (Germany) Miriam Butkereit
- Women's 78 kg: (Germany) Anna-Maria Wagner
- Women's +78 kg: (France) Romane Dicko

- February 16–18: 2024 Judo Grand Slam Baku in (Azerbaijan) Baku

- Men's 60 kg: Ramazan Abdulaev
- Men's 66 kg: (Spain) Alberto Gaitero
- Men's 73 kg: (Azerbaijan) Hidayat Heydarov
- Men's 81 kg: (Azerbaijan) Zelim Tckaev
- Men's 90 kg: (Azerbaijan) Murad Fatiyev
- Men's 100 kg: (Georgia (country)) Ilia Sulamanidze
- Men's +100 kg: Valeriy Endovitskiy

- Women's 48 kg: (Sweden) Tara Babulfath
- Women's 52 kg: (Uzbekistan) Diyora Keldiyorova
- Women's 57 kg: (Canada) Christa Deguchi
- Women's 63 kg: (Austria) Lubjana Piovesana
- Women's 70 kg: (Croatia) Barbara Matić
- Women's 78 kg: (Netherlands) Guusje Steenhuis
- Women's +78 kg: (France) Romane Dicko

- March 1–3: 2024 Judo Grand Slam Tashkent in (Uzbekistan) Tashkent

- Men's 60 kg: (Uzbekistan) Doston Ruziev
- Men's 66 kg: (Tajikistan) Nurali Emomali
- Men's 73 kg: (Italy) Manuel Lombardo
- Men's 81 kg: (Belgium) Matthias Casse
- Men's 90 kg: (Greece) Theodoros Tselidis
- Men's 100 kg: (Uzbekistan) Muzaffarbek Turoboyev
- Men's +100 kg: (Japan) Hyōga Ōta

- Women's 48 kg: Sabina Giliazova
- Women's 52 kg: (France) Amandine Buchard
- Women's 57 kg: (France) Priscilla Gneto
- Women's 63 kg: (France) Clarisse Agbegnenou
- Women's 70 kg: (Germany) Miriam Butkereit
- Women's 78 kg: (Japan) Rika Takayama
- Women's +78 kg: (China) Su Xin

- March 22–24: 2024 Judo Grand Slam Tbilisi in (Georgia (country)) Tbilisi

- Men's 60 kg: (Kazakhstan) Nurkanat Serikbayev
- Men's 66 kg: Ivan Chernykh
- Men's 73 kg: (Georgia (country)) Lasha Shavdatuashvili
- Men's 81 kg: Timur Arbuzov
- Men's 90 kg: (Georgia (country)) Lasha Bekauri
- Men's 100 kg: (Spain) Nikoloz Sherazadishvili
- Men's +100 kg: (Georgia (country)) Guram Tushishvili

- Women's 48 kg: (South Korea) Lee Hye-kyeong
- Women's 52 kg: (Spain) Ariane Toro
- Women's 57 kg: (Georgia (country)) Eteri Liparteliani
- Women's 63 kg: (Canada) Catherine Beauchemin-Pinard
- Women's 70 kg: (Croatia) Barbara Matić
- Women's 78 kg: (Ukraine) Yuliia Kurchenko
- Women's +78 kg: (Germany) Renée Lucht

- March 29–31: 2024 Judo Grand Slam Antalya in (Turkey) Antalya

- Men's 60 kg: Ayub Bliev
- Men's 66 kg: (Japan) Hifumi Abe
- Men's 73 kg: (Moldova) Adil Osmanov
- Men's 81 kg: (Japan) Takanori Nagase
- Men's 90 kg: (Japan) Sanshiro Murao
- Men's 100 kg: (Portugal) Jorge Fonseca
- Men's +100 kg: (France) Teddy Riner

- Women's 48 kg: (Japan) Natsumi Tsunoda
- Women's 52 kg: (Japan) Uta Abe
- Women's 57 kg: (Canada) Christa Deguchi
- Women's 63 kg: (South Korea) Kim Ji-su
- Women's 70 kg: (Austria) Michaela Polleres
- Women's 78 kg: (France) Madeleine Malonga
- Women's +78 kg: (France) Julia Tolofua

- May 3–5: 2024 Judo Grand Slam Dushanbe in (Tajikistan) Dushanbe

- Men's 60 kg: (Tajikistan) Muhammadsoleh Quvatov
- Men's 66 kg: (Turkmenistan) Serdar Rahimov
- Men's 73 kg: (Switzerland) Nils Stump
- Men's 81 kg: (Japan) Yoshito Hojo
- Men's 90 kg: Mansur Lorsanov
- Men's 100 kg: (Italy) Gennaro Pirelli
- Men's +100 kg: (France) Teddy Riner

- Women's 48 kg: (Mongolia) Bavuudorjiin Baasankhüü
- Women's 52 kg: (Switzerland) Fabienne Kocher
- Women's 57 kg: (Canada) Jessica Klimkait
- Women's 63 kg: (Austria) Lubjana Piovesana
- Women's 70 kg: (Austria) Michaela Polleres
- Women's 78 kg: (Germany) Anna-Maria Wagner
- Women's +78 kg: (Italy) Asya Tavano

- May 10–12: 2024 Judo Grand Slam Astana in (Kazakhstan) Astana

- Men's 60 kg: Ramazan Abdulaev
- Men's 66 kg: Murad Chopanov
- Men's 73 kg: (Italy) Manuel Lombardo
- Men's 81 kg: (Uzbekistan) Sharofiddin Boltaboev
- Men's 90 kg: Yahor Varapayeu
- Men's 100 kg: (Japan) Aaron Wolf
- Men's +100 kg: (Japan) Tatsuru Saito

- Women's 48 kg: (Kazakhstan) Galiya Tynbayeva
- Women's 52 kg: (Israel) Gefen Primo
- Women's 57 kg: (Canada) Christa Deguchi
- Women's 63 kg: (Croatia) Katarina Krišto
- Women's 70 kg: (Portugal) Tais Pina
- Women's 78 kg: (China) Ma Zhenzhao
- Women's +78 kg: (France) Romane Dicko

- October 18–20: 2024 Judo Grand Slam Abu Dhabi in (United Arab Emirates) Abu Dhabi
- December 7–8: 2024 Judo Grand Slam Tokyo in (Japan) Tokyo

==== Grand Prix ====
- January 26–28: 2024 Judo Grand Prix Odivelas in (Portugal) Odivelas

- Men's 60 kg: (Uzbekistan) Dilshodbek Baratov
- Men's 66 kg: Yago Abuladze
- Men's 73 kg: Danil Lavrentyev
- Men's 81 kg: (Japan) Yoshito Hojo
- Men's 90 kg: (Turkey) Mihael Žgank
- Men's 100 kg: Matvey Kanikovskiy
- Men's +100 kg: Inal Tasoev

- Women's 48 kg: (Japan) Hikari Yoshioka
- Women's 52 kg: (Uzbekistan) Diyora Keldiyorova
- Women's 57 kg: (South Korea) Huh Mi-mi
- Women's 63 kg: (United Kingdom) Lucy Renshall
- Women's 70 kg: (Croatia) Barbara Matić
- Women's 78 kg: (Germany) Anna Monta Olek
- Women's +78 kg: (Turkey) Hilal Öztürk

- March 8–10: 2024 Judo Grand Prix Linz in (Austria) Linz

- Men's 60 kg: (Spain) Francisco Garrigós
- Men's 66 kg: (Japan) Keita Hadano
- Men's 73 kg: (Moldova) Adil Osmanov
- Men's 81 kg: (Italy) Antonio Esposito
- Men's 90 kg: (Cuba) Iván Felipe Silva Morales
- Men's 100 kg: (Brazil) Leonardo Gonçalves
- Men's +100 kg: (Czech Republic) Lukáš Krpálek

- Women's 48 kg: (Japan) Mitsuki Kondo
- Women's 52 kg: (Brazil) Larissa Pimenta
- Women's 57 kg: (Serbia) Marica Perišić
- Women's 63 kg: (Netherlands) Joanne van Lieshout
- Women's 70 kg: (Puerto Rico) María Pérez
- Women's 78 kg: (Germany) Anna Monta Olek
- Women's +78 kg: (Brazil) Beatriz Souza

- September 13–15: 2024 Judo Grand Prix Zagreb in (Croatia) Zagreb

=== 2024 IJF Continental Tour ===
==== Judo European Open ====
- February 10–11: 2024 Győr European Open in (Hungary) Győr

- Men's 60 kg: (North Korea) Chae Kwang-jin
- Men's 66 kg: (Austria) Marcus Auer
- Men's 73 kg: (North Korea) Kim Chol-gwang
- Men's 81 kg: (Romania) Adrian Sulca
- Men's 90 kg: (Ukraine) Yaroslav Davydchuk
- Men's 100 kg: (Austria) Laurin Boehler
- Men's +100 kg: (Germany) Johannes Frey

- Women's 48 kg: (Belgium) Ellen Sallens
- Women's 52 kg: (France) Léa Métrot
- Women's 57 kg: (France) Martha Fawaz
- Women's 63 kg: (Spain) Ariela Sánchez
- Women's 70 kg: (Netherlands) Sanne Vermeer
- Women's 78 kg: (Germany) Raffaela Igl
- Women's +78 kg: (Netherlands) Paulien Sweers

- February 24–25: 2024 Warsaw European Open in (Poland) Warsaw

- Men's 60 kg: (France) Enzo Jean
- Men's 66 kg: (Ukraine) Mykyta Holoborodko
- Men's 73 kg: (Austria) Samuel Gassner
- Men's 81 kg: (Azerbaijan) Magerram Imamverdiev
- Men's 90 kg: (Italy) Tiziano Falcone
- Men's 100 kg: (Austria) Laurin Boehler
- Men's +100 kg: (France) Amadou Meite

- Women's 48 kg: (France) Anaïs Perrot
- Women's 52 kg: (Italy) Kenya Perna
- Women's 57 kg: (Turkmenistan) Maysa Pardayeva
- Women's 63 kg: (Netherlands) Nadiah Krachten
- Women's 70 kg: (Germany) Friederike Stolze
- Women's 78 kg: (France) Lyse Versmisse
- Women's +78 kg: (Ukraine) Khrystyna Homan

- June 8–9: 2024 Madrid European Open in (Spain) Madrid
- July 6–7: 2024 Tallinn European Open in (Estonia) Tallinn
- September 28–29: 2024 Prague European Open in (Czech Republic) Prague
- October 26–27: 2024 Sarajevo European Open in (Bosnia and Herzegovina) Sarajevo
- November 9–10: 2024 Rome European Open in (Italy) Rome

==== Judo European Cup ====
- March 16–17: 2024 Riga Senior European Cup in (Latvia) Riga

- Men's 60 kg: (Kazakhstan) Ulykbek Abilkhaiyr
- Men's 66 kg: (United Kingdom) Finlay Allan
- Men's 73 kg: (Kazakhstan) Dastan Shayakhmetov
- Men's 81 kg: (Croatia) Dominik Družeta
- Men's 90 kg: (Finland) Artur Kanevets
- Men's 100 kg: (Ukraine) Zaur Duniamaliiev
- Men's +100 kg: (France) Tieman Diaby

- Women's 48 kg: (Italy) Giulia Ghiglione
- Women's 52 kg: (Germany) Chiara Serra
- Women's 57 kg: (Croatia) Tihea Topolovec
- Women's 63 kg: (Netherlands) Sacha Buwalda
- Women's 70 kg: (Lithuania) Aida Vasiliauskaitė
- Women's 78 kg: (Italy) Irene Caleo
- Women's +78 kg: (Croatia) Helena Vuković

- April 6–7: 2024 Dubrovnik Senior European Cup in (Croatia) Dubrovnik

- Men's 60 kg: (Slovenia) David Starkel
- Men's 66 kg: (Israel) Guy Gutman
- Men's 73 kg: (Germany) Jano Rübo
- Men's 81 kg: (Georgia (country)) Irakli Beroshvili
- Men's 90 kg: (Germany) Lasse Schriever
- Men's 100 kg: (Netherlands) Silvan Bulthuis
- Men's +100 kg: (France) Khamzat Saparbaev

- Women's 48 kg: (Netherlands) Joshlyn Supuseba
- Women's 52 kg: (Israel) Yarden Raab
- Women's 57 kg: (Germany) Jana Ziegler
- Women's 63 kg: (Croatia) Nina Simić
- Women's 70 kg: (Slovenia) Kaja Schuster
- Women's 78 kg: (Italy) Betty Vuk
- Women's +78 kg: (Netherlands) Paulien Sweers

- May 25–26: 2024 Pale Senior European Cup in (Bosnia and Herzegovina) Pale

- Men's 60 kg: Vladimir Ulianov
- Men's 66 kg: German Kobetc
- Men's 73 kg: (Serbia) Mateja Stosić
- Men's 81 kg: Taulan Baisiev
- Men's 90 kg: (Serbia) Mihailo Cirić
- Men's 100 kg: (Slovakia) Benjamín Maťašeje
- Men's +100 kg: (Germany) Daniel Udsilauri

- Women's 48 kg: (Germany) Sarah Ischt
- Women's 52 kg: (Poland) Klaudia Cieslik
- Women's 57 kg: (Hungary) Kitti Kovács
- Women's 63 kg: (Hungary) Anna Kriza
- Women's 70 kg: (Croatia) Karla Kulić
- Women's 78 kg: (Germany) Lea Schmid
- Women's +78 kg: (Poland) Wiktoria Lis

- June 15–16: 2024 Podčetrtek Senior European Cup in (Slovenia) Podčetrtek
- September 21–22: 2024 Podgorica Senior European Cup in (Montenegro) Podgorica
- October 5–6: 2024 Portimão Senior European Cup in (Portugal) Portimão
- October 12–13: 2024 Málaga Senior European Cup in (Spain) Málaga

==== Judo African Open ====
- February 10–11: 2024 Tunis African Open in (Tunisia) Tunis

- Men's 60 kg: (Kazakhstan) Daniyar Yessengulov
- Men's 66 kg: (Kazakhstan) Nurmukhamet Botabay
- Men's 73 kg: (United Kingdom) Ethan Nairne
- Men's 81 kg: (United States) Dominic Rodriguez
- Men's 90 kg: (Netherlands) Axel Heeren
- Men's 100 kg: (Algeria) Redha Lamri
- Men's +100 kg: (Algeria) Mohamed El Mehdi Lili

- Women's 48 kg: (Tunisia) Oumaima Bedioui
- Women's 52 kg: (Algeria) Faiza Aissahine
- Women's 57 kg: (Tunisia) Chaima Sidaoui
- Women's 63 kg: Yana Makretskaya
- Women's 70 kg: (United States) Melissa Myers
- Women's 78 kg: (Canada) Coralie Godbout
- Women's +78 kg: (Tunisia) Sarra Mzougoui

- February 16–17: 2024 Algiers African Open in (Algeria) Algiers

- Men's 60 kg: (Tunisia) Fraj Dhouibi
- Men's 66 kg: (Algeria) Kais Moudetere
- Men's 73 kg: (Algeria) Wail Ezzine
- Men's 81 kg: (Algeria) Abdelhamid Zmit
- Men's 90 kg: (Tunisia) Abdelaziz Ben Ammar
- Men's 100 kg: (Algeria) Abdellah Fala
- Men's +100 kg: (Algeria) Mohamed El Mehdi Lili

- Women's 48 kg: (Tunisia) Oumaima Bedioui
- Women's 52 kg: (Tunisia) Rahma Tibi
- Women's 57 kg: (Tunisia) Chaima Sidaoui
- Women's 63 kg: (South Africa) Skye Knoester
- Women's 70 kg: (Tunisia) Maram Jmour
- Women's 78 kg: (Serbia) Milica Cvijić
- Women's +78 kg: (Tunisia) Zeineb Troudi

- April 6–7: 2024 Luanda African Open in (Angola) Luanda

- Men's 60 kg: (Angola) Leonardo Barros
- Men's 66 kg: (Angola) Edmilson Pedro
- Men's 73 kg: (Angola) Antonio Candeiro
- Men's 81 kg: (Angola) Wilson Bimbi Afonso
- Men's 90 kg: (Angola) Adriano Tchissende
- Men's 100 kg: (Bosnia and Herzegovina) Rijad Dedeic
- Men's +100 kg: (Bosnia and Herzegovina) Harun Sadikovic

- Women's 48 kg: (Paraguay) Gabriela Narváez
- Women's 52 kg: (Panama) Lilian Cordones
- Women's 57 kg: (Angola) Andreaza Antonio
- Women's 63 kg: (Central African Republic) Nadia Matchiko Guimendego
- Women's 70 kg: (Angola) Maria Niangi
- Women's 78 kg: (Burundi) Ange Ciella Niragira
- Women's +78 kg: (Cameroon) Richelle Soppi Mbella

- May 25–26: 2024 Abidjan African Open in (Ivory Coast) Abidjan
- June 1–2: 2024 Niamey African Open in (Niger) Niamey
- November 16–17: 2024 Dakar African Open in (Senegal) Dakar
- November 23–24: 2024 Yaoundé African Open in (Cameroon) Yaoundé

==== Judo Panamerican Open ====
- April 6–7: 2024 Varadero Panamerican Open in (Cuba) Varadero

- Men's 60 kg: (United States) David Terao
- Men's 66 kg: (Cuba) Orlando Polanco
- Men's 73 kg: (Cuba) Magdiel Estrada
- Men's 81 kg: (United States) Johan Silot
- Men's 90 kg: (Peru) Yuta Galarreta
- Men's 100 kg: (Cuba) Liester Cardona
- Men's +100 kg: (Cuba) Jonathan Loynaz

- Women's 48 kg: (Cuba) Yuniasy Roque Flebes
- Women's 52 kg: (Cuba) Aleanny Carbonell Julian
- Women's 57 kg: (Peru) Marian Flores
- Women's 63 kg: (Canada) Isabelle Harris
- Women's 70 kg: (Poland) Katarzyna Sobierajska
- Women's 78 kg: (Canada) Coralie Godbout
- Women's +78 kg: (Cuba) Naomis Elizarde

- May 4–5: 2024 Santiago Panamerican Open in (Chile) Santiago

- Men's 60 kg: (Ecuador) Juan Ayala
- Men's 66 kg: (El Salvador) Diego Calix
- Men's 73 kg: (Canada) Olivier Gagnon
- Men's 81 kg: (Chile) Jorge Perez
- Men's 90 kg: (Peru) Yuta Galarreta
- Men's 100 kg: (Argentina) Ivo Dargoltz
- Men's +100 kg: (Ecuador) Freddy Figueroa

- Women's 48 kg: (Argentina) Keisy Perafan
- Women's 52 kg: (Panama) Lilian Cordones
- Women's 57 kg: (Panama) Kristine Jiménez
- Women's 63 kg: (Chile) Marcela Alfaro
- Women's 70 kg: (Costa Rica) Diana Brenes
- Women's 78 kg: (Colombia) Brenda Olaya
- Women's +78 kg: (Nicaragua) Izayana Marenco

- June 21–22: 2024 Lima Panamerican Open in (Peru) Lima
- September 21–22: 2024 Cali Panamerican Open in (Colombia) Cali
- October 5–6: 2024 Santo Domingo Panamerican Open in (Dominican Republic) Santo Domingo
- November 16–17: 2024 Montreal Panamerican Open in (Canada) Montreal

==== Judo Asian Open ====
- July 13–14: 2024 Taipei Asian Open in (Chinese Taipei) Taipei
- October 12–13: 2024 Aktau Asian Open in (Kazakhstan) Aktau

==== Judo Oceania Open ====
- June 1–2: 2024 Tahiti Oceania Open in (French Polynesia) Tahiti

=== 2024 IJF Junior Tour ===
==== Judo Junior European Cup ====
- March 2–3: 2024 Sarajevo Junior European Cup in (Bosnia and Herzegovina) Sarajevo
- March 9–10: 2024 Podgorica Junior European Cup in (Montenegro) Podgorica
- March 23–24: 2024 Anadia Junior European Cup in (Portugal) Anadia
- April 13–14: 2024 Poznań Junior European Cup in (Poland) Poznań
- April 20–21: 2024 Lignano Junior European Cup in (Italy) Lignano
- May 4–5: 2024 Rijeka Junior European Cup in (Croatia) Rijeka
- May 18–19: 2024 Malaga Junior European Cup in (Spain) Málaga
- May 25–26: 2024 Kaunas Junior European Cup in (Lithuania) Kaunas
- June 1–2: 2024 Graz Junior European Cup in (Austria) Graz
- June 15–16: 2024 Birmingham Junior European Cup in (United Kingdom) Birmingham
- June 29–30: 2024 Slovenj Gradec Junior European Cup in (Slovenia) Slovenj Gradec
- July 6–7: 2024 Prague Junior European Cup in (Czech Republic) Prague
- July 13–14: 2024 Paks Junior European Cup in (Hungary) Paks
- July 27–28: 2024 Berlin Junior European Cup in (Germany) Berlin
- August 10–11: 2024 Skopje Junior European Cup in (North Macedonia) Skopje

==== Judo Junior Asian Cup ====
- April 13–14: 2024 Tashkent Junior Asian Cup in (Uzbekistan) Tashkent
- July 6–7: 2024 Almaty Junior Asian Cup in (Kazakhstan) Almaty
- August 11: 2024 Macau Junior Asian Cup in Macau
- August 18: 2024 Hong Kong Junior Asian Cup in Hong Kong

==== Judo Junior Panamerican Cup ====
- April 7: 2024 Varadero Junior Panamerican Cup in (Cuba) Varadero
- June 24: 2024 Lima Junior Panamerican Cup in (Peru) Lima
- September 1: 2024 Santo Domingo Junior Panamerican Cup in (Dominican Republic) Santo Domingo
- September 14: 2024 Asunción Junior Panamerican Cup in (Paraguay) Asunción
- November 14: 2024 Montreal Junior Panamerican Cup in (Canada) Montreal

==== Judo Junior African Cup ====
- February 8: 2024 Tunis Junior African Cup in (Tunisia) Tunis
- February 15: 2024 Algiers Junior African Cup in (Algeria) Algiers
- April 4: 2024 Luanda Junior African Cup in (Angola) Luanda
- May 30: 2024 Marrakech Junior African Cup in (Morocco) Marrakesh
- June 6: 2024 Abidjan Junior African Cup in (Ivory Coast) Abidjan
- November 14: 2024 Dakar Junior African Cup in (Senegal) Dakar

==== Judo Junior Oceanian Cup ====
- May 5: 2024 Mandurah Junior Oceanian Cup in (Australia) Mandurah

== Ju-jitsu ==
=== World and Continental Championships ===
- April 4–7: 2024 European Championships JuJitsu U16-U18-U21 in (Romania) Pitești
- April 30: 2024 Asian Ju-jitsu Championships in (United Arab Emirates) Abu Dhabi
- May 29: 2024 European Ju-jitsu Championships in (Germany) Gelsenkirchen

== Karate ==
=== Various karate championships ===
- February 9–11: 2024 EKF Junior, Cadet and U21 Championships in (Georgia (country)) Tbilisi

- Official results

- March 7–9: 2023 African Games in (Ghana) Accra

- Men's Kata: (Egypt) Karim Waleed Ghaly
- Men's Team Kata: Egypt
- Men's Kumite 60 kg: (Algeria) Alaa Selmi
- Men's Kumite 67 kg: (Algeria) Ayoub Anis Helassa
- Men's Kumite 75 kg: (Egypt) Abdalla Abdelaziz
- Men's Kumite 84 kg: (Egypt) Youssef Badawy
- Men's Kumite 84 kg+: (Tunisia) Houssem Eddine Choiya
- Men's Team Kumite: Egypt

- Women's Kata: (Morocco) Aya En-Nesyry
- Women's Team Kata: Egypt
- Women's Kumite 50 kg: (Egypt) Yasmin Nasr Elgewily
- Women's Kumite 55 kg: (Algeria) Louiza Abouriche
- Women's Kumite 61 kg: (Egypt) Noursin Aly
- Women's Kumite 68 kg: (Morocco) Fatima-Zahra Chajai
- Women's Kumite 68 kg+: (Egypt) Menna Shaaban Okila
- Women's Team Kumite: Egypt

- May 8–12: 2024 European Karate Championships in (Croatia) Zadar

- Men's Kata: (Turkey) Ali Sofuoğlu
- Men's Team Kata: Turkey
- Men's Kumite 60 kg: (Greece) Christos-Stefanos Xenos
- Men's Kumite 67 kg: (Hungary) Yves Martial Tadissi
- Men's Kumite 75 kg: (Croatia) Ivan Martinac
- Men's Kumite 84 kg: (Greece) Konstantinos Mastrogiannis
- Men's Kumite 84 kg+: (Croatia) Anđelo Kvesić
- Men's Team Kumite: Italy

- Women's Kata: (Turkey) Dilara Bozan
- Women's Team Kata: Spain
- Women's Kumite 50 kg: (Croatia) Ema Sgardelli
- Women's Kumite 55 kg: (Germany) Mia Bitsch
- Women's Kumite 61 kg: (Slovakia) Ingrida Bakoš Suchánková
- Women's Kumite 68 kg: (France) Alizée Agier
- Women's Kumite 68 kg+: (Germany) Johanna Kneer
- Women's Team Kumite: Germany

- October 9–13: 2024 World Cadet, Junior and U21 Karate Championships in (Italy) Venice

=== Karate1 Premier League ===
- January 26–28: Karate 1–Premier League #1 in (France) Paris

- Men's Kata: (Japan) Kakeru Nishiyama
- Men's Kumite 60 kg: (Turkey) Eray Şamdan
- Men's Kumite 67 kg: (Morocco) Said Oubaya
- Men's Kumite 75 kg: (Egypt) Abdalla Abdelaziz
- Men's Kumite 84 kg: (Ukraine) Valerii Chobotar
- Men's Kumite 84 kg+: (Egypt) Taha Tarek Mahmoud

- Women's Kata: (Japan) Maho Ono
- Women's Kumite 50 kg: (Venezuela) Yorgelis Salazar
- Women's Kumite 55 kg: (Japan) Airi Shima
- Women's Kumite 61 kg: (Iran) Atousa Golshadnejad
- Women's Kumite 68 kg: (France) Thalya Sombe
- Women's Kumite 68 kg+: (Spain) Maria Torres Garcia

- March 15–17: Karate 1–Premier League #2 in (Turkey) Antalya

- Men's Kata: (Japan) Kakeru Nishiyama
- Men's Kumite 60 kg: (Kuwait) Abdullah Shaaban
- Men's Kumite 67 kg: (Morocco) Said Oubaya
- Men's Kumite 75 kg: (Egypt) Abdalla Abdelaziz
- Men's Kumite 84 kg: (Egypt) Youssef Badawy
- Men's Kumite 84 kg+: (Croatia) Anđelo Kvesić

- Women's Kata: (Hong Kong) Grace Lau
- Women's Kumite 50 kg: (Kazakhstan) Moldir Zhangbyrbay
- Women's Kumite 55 kg: (Kazakhstan) Bella Samasheva
- Women's Kumite 61 kg: (Morocco) Fatima-Zahra Chajai
- Women's Kumite 68 kg: (Switzerland) Elena Quirici
- Women's Kumite 68 kg+: (Germany) Johanna Kneer

- April 19–21: Karate 1–Premier League #3 in (Egypt) Cairo

- Men's Kata: (Japan) Kakeru Nishiyama
- Men's Kumite 60 kg: (Jordan) Abdallah Hammad
- Men's Kumite 67 kg: (Jordan) Abdelrahman Al-Masatfa
- Men's Kumite 75 kg: (Egypt) Abdalla Abdelaziz
- Men's Kumite 84 kg: (Jordan) Mohammad Al-Jafari
- Men's Kumite 84 kg+: (Saudi Arabia) Sanad Sufyani

- Women's Kata: (Japan) Kiri Mishima
- Women's Kumite 50 kg: (Egypt) Ganna Aly
- Women's Kumite 55 kg: (Chile) Valentina Toro
- Women's Kumite 61 kg: (Germany) Reem Khamis
- Women's Kumite 68 kg: (Japan) Tsubasa Kama
- Women's Kumite 68 kg+: (Germany) Johanna Kneer

- May 31 – June 2: Karate 1–Premier League #4 in (Morocco) Casablanca

- Men's Kata: (Japan) Abe Sakichi
- Men's Kumite 60 kg: (Belgium) Anass Abdelmalki
- Men's Kumite 67 kg: (Germany) Muhammed Özdemir
- Men's Kumite 75 kg: (Kazakhstan) Nurkanat Azhikanov
- Men's Kumite 84 kg: (Greece) Konstantinos Mastrogiannis
- Men's Kumite 84 kg+: (Germany) Nikolai Sekot

- Women's Kata: (Japan) Hisami Nakaji
- Women's Kumite 50 kg: (Japan) Aika Okazaki
- Women's Kumite 55 kg: (Luxembourg) Jennifer Warling
- Women's Kumite 61 kg: (Belgium) Maryam Ajaray
- Women's Kumite 68 kg: (Armenia) Anita Makyan
- Women's Kumite 68 kg+: (Portugal) Rita Oliveira

=== Karate 1–Series A ===
- January 12–14: Karate 1–Series A #1 in (Greece) Athens

- Men's Team Kata: Italy
- Men's Kata: (Japan) Ryusei Ikeda
- Men's Kumite 60 kg: (Turkey) Mert Halici
- Men's Kumite 67 kg: (Portugal) Miguel Nunes Ribeiro Diogo
- Men's Kumite 75 kg: (Ukraine) Heorhii Pitsul
- Men's Kumite 84 kg: (Turkey) Hasan Arslan
- Men's Kumite 84 kg+: (Iran) Saleh Abazari

- Women's Team Kata: Portugal
- Women's Kata: (Japan) Mishima Kiri
- Women's Kumite 50 kg: (Iran) Masoumeh Mohsenian
- Women's Kumite 55 kg: (Greece) Maria Stoli
- Women's Kumite 61 kg: (Belgium) Maryam Ajaray
- Women's Kumite 68 kg: (Turkey) Sudenur Aksoy
- Women's Kumite 68 kg+: (Switzerland) Fabienne Kaufmann

- February 16–18: Karate 1–Series A #2 in (Cyprus) Larnaca

- Men's Team Kata: Kuwait
- Men's Kata: (Japan) Ryusei Ikeda
- Men's Kumite 60 kg: (Turkey) Mert Halici
- Men's Kumite 67 kg: (Brazil) Vinícius Figueira
- Men's Kumite 75 kg: (Iran) Bahman Asgari
- Men's Kumite 84 kg: (Japan) Ryukai Matsumoto
- Men's Kumite 84 kg+: (Japan) Fumiya Yoshimura

- Women's Team Kata: Spain
- Women's Kata: (Japan) Mishima Kiri
- Women's Kumite 50 kg: (Malaysia) Shahmalarani Chandran
- Women's Kumite 55 kg: (Japan) Rina Kodo
- Women's Kumite 61 kg: (Ukraine) Darya Yervacheva
- Women's Kumite 68 kg: (Japan) Sara Terazawa
- Women's Kumite 68 kg+: (Germany) Amelie Luecke

- September 13–15: Karate 1–Series A #3 in (Austria) Salzburg

=== Karate1 Youth League ===
- February 22–25: Karate 1–Youth League #1 in (United Arab Emirates) Fujairah
- May 16–19: Karate 1–Youth League #2 in (Spain) A Coruña
- June 27–30: Karate 1–Youth League #3 in (Croatia) Poreč
- August 8–11: Karate 1–Youth League #4 in (Mexico) Cancún
- December 5–8: Karate 1–Youth League #5 in (Italy) Venice

== Kazak kuresi ==
=== World and Continental Championships ===
- January 27-28: 2024 Senior European Kazak Kuresi Championships in (Azerbaijan) Baku

- Men's 55 kg: (Georgia (country)) Nika Bachiashvili
- Men's 60 kg: (Azerbaijan) Eyvaz Bakhshiyev
- Men's 66 kg: (Azerbaijan) Mirfattah Seydaliyev
- Men's 74 kg: (Azerbaijan) Hajali Gasimov
- Men's 82 kg: (Azerbaijan) Adil Adilzade
- Men's 90 kg: (Azerbaijan) Jeyhun Huseynov
- Men's 100 kg: (Georgia (country)) Zurab Chagelishvili
- Men's 100+kg: (Azerbaijan) Mahammad Mammedzada

- Women's 48 kg: (Georgia (country)) Nino Iashvili
- Women's 52 kg: (Georgia (country)) Anano Morgoshia
- Women's 56 kg: (Georgia (country)) Mariam Mazanashvili
- Women's 60 kg: (Georgia (country)) Mari Makharashvili
- Women's 65 kg: (Azerbaijan) Diana Shoranova
- Women's 70 kg: (Georgia (country)) Ana Chkhaidze
- Women's 77 kg: (Azerbaijan) Shahana Almammadova
- Women's 77 kg+: (Georgia (country)) Elene Kebadze

== Kendo ==
- All Japan Kendo Federation Calendar
- European Kendo Federation Calendar
- International Kendo Federation

=== World Championships ===
- July 4–7: 2024 World Kendo Championship in (Italy) Milan

=== All Japan Kendo Federation Championships ===
- April 21: The 22nd All Japan Kendo 8-Dan holders’ Invitational Tournament (Individual) in Nagoya
- November 3: 63rd All Japan Women's Kendo Championship (Individual) in Tokyo
- November 3: 72nd All Japan Kendo Championship (Individual) in Tokyo

=== European Kendo Federation Events ===
- March 16–17: 25th International Kendo Donaucup in (Austria) Baden
- April 6–7: Iijima cup Individual, teams and mixed 7th. Dan Tournament in (Netherlands) Leiden
- April 13–14: Riga Kendo Open 2024 in (Latvia) Riga
- April 18–21: Magglingen Iaido & Jodo Seminar & Swiss Open Jodo Taikai in (Switzerland) Magglingen
- April 19–21: 11th Soryu Iaido Cup and 17th All Greece Iaido Championships in Athens
- May 17–19: 30th Kendo Junior Kojika Spring Tournament in (Belgium) Ghent
- May 24–26: 14th Balkan Kendo Cup in (Turkey) Istanbul
- June 1–2: Riga cup & Yumura cup 2024 in (Latvia) Riga
- June 14–16: 5. Wakaba Cup - Tournament for kids and beginners up to 18 years in (Austria) Fürstenfeld
- June 19–23: 31st. Hungary Kendo Cup in Budapest
- August 23–25: Ljubljana Summer Seminar & Samurai Cup 2024 in (Slovenia) Ljubljana
- September 6–8: 22nd European Jodo Championships in (Finland) Espoo
- November 8–10: 31st European Iaido Championships in (Sweden) Gothenburg
- November 9–10: Bergiselschlacht 2024 - Individual (Kyu/ Dan separately) / Team competition in (Austria) Innsbruck

== Kickboxing ==
- 2024 WAKO Calendar

=== World and Continental Championships ===
- October 6–13: 2024 Asian Kickboxing Championships in (Cambodia) Phnom Penh
- October 30 – November 2: 2024 Pan American Kickboxing Championships in (Chile) Santiago
- November 1–10: 2024 WAKO European Championships in (Greece) Athens
- November 21–30: 2021 Asian Indoor and Martial Arts Games in (Thailand) Bangkok
- December 9–12: 2024 WAKO African Continental Championships in South Africa

=== 2024 WAKO World Cup ===
- March 19–24: Italian Kickboxing World Cup in (Italy) Jesolo
- May 16–19: Turkish Open WAKO World Cup in (Turkey) Istanbul
- June 11–17: Hungarian Kickboxing World Cup in (Hungary) Budapest
- September 24–29: Uzbekistan World Cup in Tashkent

=== 2024 Kickboxing European Cup ===
- January 26–28: Athens Challenge Open in (Greece) Athens
- February 16–18: Zagreb Open in (Croatia) Zagreb
- April 12–14: WAKO Grand Prix Sarajevo in (Bosnia and Herzegovina) Sarajevo

=== Other WAKO events (Incomplete) ===
- January 19–21: Golden Glove International Cup in (Italy) Mareno di Piave
- January 26–28: Athens Challenge Open Cup in (Greece) Athens
- February 3: Moslavac Open International Cup in (Croatia) Popovača
- February 7–11: 3rd India Open International Kickboxing Tournament in New Delhi
- February 16–18: Zagreb Open Kickboxing Cup in (Croatia) Zagreb
- February 23–24: 23rd Slovak Open Memorial of Ladislav „DOKY“ Toth in (Slovakia) Bratislava
- March 1–3: Irish Open International in (Republic of Ireland) Dublin
- March 1–3: Yokoso Dutch Open Cup in (Netherlands) Amsterdam
- March 8–9: 11th Zabok Open in (Croatia) Zabok
- March 8–9: 7th KBH Masters International Kickboxing Tournament in (Austria) Graz

== Muay Thai ==
=== World Championships ===
- May 31 – June 9: 2024 IFMA World Muaythai Championships in (Greece) Patras
- September 11–20: 2024 IFMA Youth World Muaythai Championships in (Thailand) Bangkok

=== Continental Championships ===
- January 26–27: 2024 Nordic Championships in (Sweden) Stockholm
- February 20–25: 2024 African Muay Thai Championships in (Egypt) Cairo
- September 24–29: 2024 Pan American Muay Thai Championships in (Canada) Ottawa
- November 7–14: 2024 European Muay Thai Championships in (Kosovo) Pristina

== Sambo ==
- 2024 International Sambo Federation Calendar

=== World Championships ===
- September 7–8: 2024 World Beach Sambo Championships in (Morocco) Casablanca
- October 11–13: 2024 World Cadet, Youth and Junior Sambo Championships in (Cyprus) Larnaca
- October 25–27: 2024 World Masters Sambo Championships in (Tajikistan) Dushanbe
- November 8–10: 2024 World Sambo Championships in (Kazakhstan) Astana

=== Continental Championships ===
- May 9–10: 2024 European Sambo Championships in (Serbia) Novi Sad
- May 11–12: 2024 European Youth and Junior Sambo Championships in (Serbia) Novi Sad
- May 11–14: 2024 Asia & Oceania Youth and Junior Sambo Championships in (Kazakhstan) Aktau
- May 11–14: 2024 Asia & Oceania Masters Sambo Championships in (Kazakhstan) Aktau
- June 1–3: 2024 African Sambo Championships in (Egypt) Cairo
- June 28–30: 2024 Asia & Oceania Sambo Championships in Macau
- August 23–24: 2024 Pan American Sambo Championships in (Brazil) Cuiaba
- August 25: 2024 Pan American Beach Sambo Championships in (Brazil) Cuiaba
- October 17: 2024 Asia & Oceania Beach Sambo Championships in (Bangladesh) Cox's Bazar

=== World Sambo Cup ===
- April 4–5: World Cup in (Armenia) Yerevan

- Combat sambo

- Men's 58 kg: Vladimir Lamanov
- Men's 64 kg: Takhir Tokarev
- Men's 71 kg: (Ukraine) Andrii Kucherenko
- Men's 79 kg: (Ukraine) Vladyslav Rudniev
- Men's 88 kg: (Ukraine) Petro Davydenko
- Men's 98 kg: (Uzbekistan) Ozodbek Murotov
- Men's 98+kg: Mikhail Kashurnikov

- Women's 54 kg: Vera Lotkova
- Women's 59 kg: (Romania) Khrystyna Bondar
- Women's 65 kg: (Ukraine) Yuliana Lysenko
- Women's 72 kg: Iana Poliakova
- Women's 80 kg: (Ukraine) Valeriia Zakharevych

- Sport sambo

- Men's 58 kg: Kharun Tlishev
- Men's 64 kg: Vladimir Mnatsakanian
- Men's 71 kg: Ivan Agafonov
- Men's 79 kg: Stanislav Skryabin
- Men's 88 kg: David Oganisian
- Men's 98 kg: Dmitrii Torgashov
- Men's 98+kg: Aleksei Merzlikin

- Women's 50 kg: Oksana Kobeleva
- Women's 54 kg: Elizaveta Khachikova
- Women's 59 kg: Ekaterina Tsybert
- Women's 65 kg: (Ukraine) Anastasiya Shevchenko
- Women's 72 kg: Daria Kazantseva
- Women's 80 kg: Elena Allenova
- Women's 80+kg: (Ukraine) Anastasiia Komovych

- August 15–16: World Cup in (Kyrgyzstan) Cholpon-Ata

=== International Tournaments ===
- March 2: International Sambo Tournament in (Netherlands) Dalfsen
- March 21–22: International Sambo Tournament in (Greece) Amindeo
- August 3: Cup of the President of the National Olympic Committee of Armenia Gagik Tsarukyan in Yerevan
- September 20–21: 2024 South Asia Sambo Championships in (Sri Lanka) Kandy
- September 27–28: Eccas Open Sambo International Tournament in (Cameroon) Yaounde

== Sumo ==
- Japan Sumo Association
- 2024 Amateur Sumo Calendar
- 2024 European Sumo Federation Calendar

=== Professional sumo ===
- January 14–28: 2024 Hatsu basho in (Japan) Tokyo

- Winner: (Mongolia) Terunofuji

- March 10–24: 2024 Haru basho in (Japan) Osaka

- Winner: (Japan) Takerufuji

- May 12–26: 2024 Natsu basho in (Japan) Tokyo
- July 14–28: 2024 Nagoya basho in (Japan) Nagoya
- September 8–22: 2024 Aki basho in (Japan) Tokyo
- November 10–24: 2024 Kyushu basho in (Japan) Kyushu

=== Amateur sumo ===
==== World and Continental Championships ====
- May 24–26: 2024 European Sumo Championships (Seniors, U21 and U23) in (Greece) Patras
- June 1: 2024 South American Sumo Championships in (Argentina) Buenos Aires
- June 1: 2024 North American Sumo Championships in (United States) San Diego
- June 15: 2024 Oceania Sumo Championships in (Australia) Sydney
- June 21–23: 2024 European U18, U15 Sumo Championships in (Poland) Kwidzyn
- July 27–28: 2024 European Beach Sumo Championships in (Azerbaijan) Baku
- September 7–8: 2024 Sumo World Championships in (Poland) Krotoszyn

==== European Cup ====
- February 17: EC #1 in (Estonia) Vinni
- April 6: EC #2 in (Poland) Suwałki
- November 9: EC #3 in Norway

==== Other tournaments ====
- January 14: Mihály Tar Memorial in (Hungary) Érd
- April 20 & 21: International Tournament in (Germany) Brandenburg
- August 3 & 4: International Tournament in (Scotland) Coatbridge
- October 5: International Tournament in Switzerland

== Taekwondo ==
- 2024 World Taekwondo Event Calendar - Kyorugi
- 2024 World Taekwondo Event Calendar - Poomsae

=== Olympic Games ===
- August 7–10: 2024 Summer Olympics in (France) Paris

=== Other Multi-sport Games ===
- October 23–31: ISF Gymnasiade in (Bahrain) Manama (kyorugi & poomsae)
- November 22–25: 6th Asian Indoor and Martial Arts Games in (Thailand) Bangkok (kyorugi & poomsae)

=== World Championships ===
- June 1–3: 2024 CISM World Military Taekwondo Championship in (South Korea) Mungyeong
- July 1–3: Chuncheon 2024 World Taekwondo World Cup Team Championships in (South Korea) Chuncheon
- October 1–6: 2024 World Taekwondo Junior Championships in (South Korea) Chuncheon
- November 16–17: Singapore 2024 World Taekwondo Virtual Championships in Singapore
- November 30 – December 4: 2024 World Taekwondo Poomsae Championships in Hong Kong

=== Continental Championships ===
- March 17–20: All African Games (kyorugi & poomsae) in (Ghana) Accra

- Kyorugi

- Men's 54 kg: (Egypt) Moatazbellah Assem Atta Aboserea
- Men's 58 kg: (Niger) Nouridine Issaka
- Men's 63 kg: (Tunisia) Mohamed Khalil Jendoubi
- Men's 68 kg: (Senegal) Mouhamadou Mansour Lo
- Men's 74 kg: (Niger) Aboubacar Mangue Gaya
- Men's 80 kg: (Tunisia) Firas Katoussi
- Men's 87 kg: (Egypt) Ahmad Saied Aly Rawy Mohamed
- Men's 87+kg: (Niger) Abdoul Razak Issoufou

- Women's 46 kg: (Niger) Zaraou Abdou Bilane
- Women's 49 kg: (Tunisia) Ikram Dhahri
- Women's 53 kg: (Tunisia) Ouhoud Ben Aoun
- Women's 57 kg: (Tunisia) Chaima Toumi
- Women's 62 kg: (Tunisia) Wafa Masghouni
- Women's 67 kg: (Nigeria) Elizabeth Anyanacho
- Women's 73 kg: (Morocco) Omayma Boumh
- Women's 73 kg+: (Morocco) Fatima-Ezzahra Aboufaras

- April 23–24: 2024 Taekwondo European Small Countries Championships in (Estonia) Tallinn
- May 1: 2024 Pan American Poomsae Championships in (Brazil) Rio de Janeiro
- May 2: 2024 Pan American Taekwondo Championships in (Brazil) Rio de Janeiro
- May 10–12: 2024 European Taekwondo Championships in (Serbia) Belgrade

- Kyorugi

- Men's 54 kg: (Turkey) Furkan Ubeyde Çamoğlu
- Men's 58 kg: (Italy) Vito Dell'Aquila
- Men's 63 kg: (Hungary) Omar Salim
- Men's 68 kg: (United Kingdom) Bradly Sinden
- Men's 74 kg: (Spain) Daniel Quesada
- Men's 80 kg: (Croatia) Toni Kanaet
- Men's 87 kg: (Turkey) Enbiya Taha Biçer
- Men's 87+kg: (United Kingdom) Caden Cunningham

- Women's 46 kg: (Croatia) Lena Stojković
- Women's 49 kg: (Spain) Adriana Cerezo
- Women's 53 kg: Tatiana Minina
- Women's 57 kg: (Croatia) Nika Karabatić
- Women's 62 kg: (Bulgaria) Kimia Alizadeh
- Women's 67 kg: (Belgium) Sarah Chaâri
- Women's 73 kg: (France) Althéa Laurin
- Women's 73 kg+: (Germany) Lorena Brandl

- May 14–15: 2024 Asian Taekwondo Poomsae Championships in (Vietnam) Da Nang
- May 16–18: 2024 Asian Taekwondo Championships in (Vietnam) Da Nang

- Men's 54 kg: (Saudi Arabia) Riad Hamdi
- Men's 58 kg: (Iran) Mehdi Hajimousaei
- Men's 63 kg: (South Korea) Jang Jun
- Men's 68 kg: (South Korea) Jin Ho-jun
- Men's 74 kg: (South Korea) Lee Sang-ryeol
- Men's 80 kg: (Uzbekistan) Jasurbek Jaysunov
- Men's 87 kg: (Iran) Mohammad Hossein Yazdani
- Men's 87+kg: (Iran) Arian Salimi

- Women's 46 kg: (China) Wang Shiyi
- Women's 49 kg: (China) Wang Xiaolu
- Women's 53 kg: (Saudi Arabia) Dunya Abutaleb
- Women's 57 kg: (South Korea) Kim Yu-jin
- Women's 62 kg: (Thailand) Sasikarn Tongchan
- Women's 67 kg: (Vietnam) Bạc Thị Khiêm
- Women's 73 kg: (South Korea) Myeong Mi-na
- Women's 73 kg+: (China) Xu Lei

- June 4–6: 2024 African Cadet & Junior Taekwondo Championships in (Rwanda) Kigali

=== Olympic Qualification Tournaments ===
Quota winners

- February 10–11: African Qualification Tournament in (Senegal) Dakar

- Men's 58 kg: (Niger) Nouridine Issaka & (Senegal) Bocar Diop
- Men's 68 kg: (Egypt) Ahmed Nassar & (Burkina Faso) Ibrahim Maïga
- Men's 80 kg: (Tunisia) Firas Katoussi & (Burkina Faso) Faysal Sawadogo
- Men's 80+kg: (Niger) Abdoul Razak Issoufou & (The Gambia) Alasan Ann

- Women's 49 kg: (Lesotho) Michelle Tau & (Tunisia) Ikram Dhahri
- Women's 57 kg: (Gabon) Emmanuella Atora & (Tunisia) Chaima Toumi
- Women's 67 kg: (Egypt) Aya Shehata & (Nigeria) Elizabeth Anyanacho
- Women's 67 kg+: (Morocco) F.-E. Aboufaras & (Ivory Coast) Astan Bathily

- March 9–10: European Qualification Tournament in (Bulgaria) Sofia

- Men's 58 kg: (Republic of Ireland) Jack Woolley & (Authorised Neutral Athletes) Georgi Gurtsiev
- Men's 68 kg: (Croatia) Marko Golubić & (Hungary) Levente Józsa
- Men's 80 kg: (Authorised Neutral Athletes) Maksim Khramtsov & (Denmark) Edi Hrnic
- Men's 80+kg: (Norway) Richard Ordemann & (Slovenia) Patrik Divković

- Women's 49 kg: (Italy) Ilenia Matonti & (Israel) Avishag Semberg
- Women's 57 kg: (Athlete Refugee Team) Kimia Alizadeh & (Authorised Neutral Athletes) Tatiana Minina
- Women's 67 kg: (Spain) Cecilia Castro & (Hungary) Viviana Márton
- Women's 67 kg+: (Authorised Neutral Athletes) Polina Khan & (Czech Republic) Petra Štolbová

- March 15–16: Asian Qualification Tournament in (China) Tai'an

- Men's 58 kg: (Palestine) Omar Yaser Ismail & (Kazakhstan) S. Ababakirov
- Men's 68 kg: (Thailand) Banlung Tubtimdang & (Athlete Refugee Team) Ali Reza Abbasi
- Men's 80 kg: (Uzbekistan) Jasurbek Jaysunov & (Kazakhstan) Batyrkhan Toleugali
- Men's 80+kg: (China) Song Zhaoxiang & (Iran) Arian Salimi

- Women's 49 kg: (Iran) Mobina Nematzadeh & (Saudi Arabia) Dunya Abutaleb
- Women's 57 kg: (Lebanon) Laetitia Aoun & (South Korea) Kim Yu-jin
- Women's 67 kg: (Thailand) S. Tongchan & (Uzbekistan) Ozoda Sobirjonova
- Women's 67 kg+: (Tajikistan) M. Abdusalomova & (Jordan) Rama Abu Al-Rub

- April 6: Oceania Qualification Tournament in (Solomon Islands) Honiara

- Men's 58 kg: (Australia) Bailey Lewis
- Men's 68 kg: (New Zealand) Eisa Mozhdeh
- Men's 80 kg: (Australia) Leon Sejranovic
- Men's 80+kg: (Papua New Guinea) Gibson Mara

- Women's 49 kg: (Australia) Saffron Tambyrajah
- Women's 57 kg: (Australia) Stacey Hymer
- Women's 67 kg: (New Zealand) Jemesa Landers
- Women's 67 kg+: (Fiji) Venice Traill

- April 9–10: Pan American Qualification Tournament in (Dominican Republic) Santo Domingo

- Men's 58 kg: (Venezuela) Yohandri Granado & (Argentina) Lucas Guzmán
- Men's 68 kg: (Brazil) Edival Pontes & (Dominican Republic) Bernardo Pié
- Men's 80 kg: (Chile) Joaquín Churchill & (Brazil) Henrique Marques
- Men's 80+kg: (United States) Jonathan Healy & (Cuba) Rafael Alba

- Women's 49 kg: (Canada) Josipa Kafadar & (Uruguay) María Sara Grippoli
- Women's 57 kg: (United States) Faith Dillon & (Brazil) Maria Clara Pacheco
- Women's 67 kg: (United States) Kristina Teachout & (Dominican Republic) Madelyn Rodríguez
- Women's 67 kg+: (Chile) Fernanda Aguirre & (Cuba) Arlettys Acosta

=== WT President's Cup ===
- February 16–19: WT President's Cup - Asia in (Iran) Tehran

- Men's 54 kg: (Kazakhstan) Bektore Oralkhanov
- Men's 58 kg: (Iran) Mahdi Hajimousaei
- Men's 63 kg: (Jordan) Zaid Alhalawani
- Men's 68 kg: (Iran) Amir Morteza Abedian
- Men's 74 kg: (Iran) Ali Khoshravesh
- Men's 80 kg: (Iran) Amirmohammad Ashrafi
- Men's 87 kg: (Iran) Mehdi Abedini
- Men's 87+kg: (Iran) Arian Salimi

- Women's 46 kg: (Iran) Sogand Shiri
- Women's 49 kg: (Kazakhstan) Botakoz Kapanova
- Women's 53 kg: (Iran) Mobina Nematzadeh
- Women's 57 kg: (Iran) Aida Khorshidi
- Women's 62 kg: (Iran) Hasti Mohammadi
- Women's 67 kg: (Iran) Yalda Valinejad
- Women's 73 kg: (Armenia) Nina Urganaeva
- Women's 73 kg+: (Iran) Zahra Pouresmaeilkarani

- March 15–16: WT President's Cup - Pan Am in (Costa Rica) Heredia (kyorugi & poomsae)

- Men's 54 kg: (Brazil) Giovanni Aubin de Moraes
- Men's 58 kg: (Hungary) Sharif Gergely Salim
- Men's 63 kg: (Brazil) Gabriel Ramos
- Men's 68 kg: (Argentina) Jose Luis Acuña
- Men's 74 kg: (United States) Aiden Bevel
- Men's 80 kg: (United States) CJ Nickolas
- Men's 87 kg: (United States) Michael Christopher Ridriguez
- Men's 87+kg: (Chile) Franco Muñoz

- Women's 46 kg: (Mexico) Zelzin Viridiana Silva García
- Women's 49 kg: (Brazil) Camila Bezerra
- Women's 53 kg: (Canada) Aurélie Poiré
- Women's 57 kg: (Costa Rica) Neshi Lee Lindo Alvarez
- Women's 62 kg: (United States) Makayla Greenwood
- Women's 67 kg: (United States) Anastasija Zolotic
- Women's 73 kg: (United States) Crystal Weekes
- Women's 73 kg+: (United States) Naomi Alade

- April 26–28: WT President's Cup - Europe in (Estonia) Tallinn

- Men's 54 kg: (Bulgaria) Hristiyan Georgiev
- Men's 58 kg: (Republic of Ireland) Jack Woolley
- Men's 63 kg: (China) Zhang Hao
- Men's 68 kg: (Sweden) Leon Glasnović
- Men's 74 kg: (Slovenia) Lin Kovačič
- Men's 80 kg: (Jordan) Saleh El-Sharabaty
- Men's 87 kg: (Tunisia) Motaz Ifaoui
- Men's 87+kg: (Mexico) Carlos Sansores

- Women's 46 kg: (Japan) Ruka Okamoto
- Women's 49 kg: (Croatia) Lena Stojković
- Women's 53 kg: (China) Wang Xiaolu
- Women's 57 kg: (China) Yang Junli
- Women's 62 kg: (China) Luo Zongshi
- Women's 67 kg: (China) Zhang Mengyu
- Women's 73 kg: (China) Zhou Zeqi
- Women's 73 kg+: (Spain) Tania Castiñeira Etcheverria

- April 27–28: WT President's Cup - Africa in (Equatorial Guinea) Malabo
- September 19–20: WT President's Cup - Oceania in (Australia) Brisbane (kyorugi & poomsae)

=== 2024 World Taekwondo Grand Prix ===
- December: 2024 World Taekwondo Grand Prix Final in TBD

=== World Taekwondo Kyorugi Events ===
- February 1–2: 4th Arab Taekwondo Championships in (United Arab Emirates) Fujairah

- Men's 54 kg: (Jordan) Laith Alrawashdeh
- Men's 58 kg: (Palestine) Omar Yaser Ismail
- Men's 63 kg: (Jordan) Zaid Alhalawani
- Men's 68 kg: (Egypt) Omar Sharaky
- Men's 74 kg: (Tunisia) Jasser Aouini
- Men's 80 kg: (Saudi Arabia) Ahmad Al Muwallad
- Men's 87 kg: (Tunisia) Motaz Ifaoui
- Men's 87+kg: (Egypt) Abdullah Essam Mohiuddin

- Women's 46 kg: (Egypt) Laila Sherif Hamdy
- Women's 49 kg: (Tunisia) Ouhoud Ben Aoun
- Women's 53 kg: (Saudi Arabia) Dunya Abutaleb
- Women's 57 kg: (Lebanon) Laetitia Aoun
- Women's 62 kg: (Tunisia) Wafa Masghouni
- Women's 67 kg: (Qatar) Maram Fatnassi
- Women's 73 kg: (Jordan) Rama Abo-Alrub
- Women's 73 kg+: (Egypt) Toka Shaaban Sleman Hassan

- February 3–4: Austrian Open in (Austria) Innsbruck

- Men's 54 kg: (Serbia) Relja Ivković
- Men's 58 kg: (Netherlands) Milan Molle
- Men's 63 kg: (Italy) Vito Dell'Aquila
- Men's 68 kg: (Croatia) Marko Golubić
- Men's 74 kg: (Slovenia) Lin Kovačič
- Men's 80 kg: (Italy) Simone Alessio
- Men's 87 kg: (Ukraine) Artem Harbar
- Men's 87+kg: (Turkey) Emre Kutalmış Ateşli

- Women's 46 kg: (Israel) Rivka Bayech
- Women's 49 kg: (Croatia) Lena Stojković
- Women's 53 kg: (Israel) Avishag Semberg
- Women's 57 kg: (Hungary) Luana Márton
- Women's 62 kg: (Serbia) Ela Maxic
- Women's 67 kg: (Croatia) Doris Pole
- Women's 73 kg: (Croatia) Mila Mastelić
- Women's 73 kg+: (Poland) Aleksandra Kowalczuk

- February 4–7: Fujairah Open in (United Arab Emirates) Fujairah

- Men's 54 kg: (Uzbekistan) Jakhongir Khudayberdiev
- Men's 58 kg: (Iran) Mahdi Hajimousaei
- Men's 63 kg: (Jordan) Zaid Alhalawani
- Men's 68 kg: (Uzbekistan) Diyorbek Tukhliboev
- Men's 74 kg: (Uzbekistan) Ulugbek Rashitov
- Men's 80 kg: (Uzbekistan) Jasurbek Jaysunov
- Men's 87 kg: (Saudi Arabia) Ali Mabrouk S Almabrouk
- Men's 87+kg: (Iran) Arian Salimi

- Women's 46 kg: (Iran) Sogand Shiri
- Women's 49 kg: (Sweden) Indra Bodén
- Women's 53 kg: (Saudi Arabia) Dunya Abutaleb
- Women's 57 kg: (Iran) Tina Modanlou
- Women's 62 kg: (Tunisia) Wafa Masghouni
- Women's 67 kg: (Uzbekistan) Ozoda Sobirjonova
- Women's 73 kg: (Morocco) Omayma Boumh
- Women's 73 kg+: (Uzbekistan) Iroda Mirtadjieva

- February 9–14: Turkish Open in (Turkey) Antalya

- Men's 54 kg: (Turkey) Furkan Ubeyde Çamoğlu
- Men's 58 kg: (Turkey) Ömer Faruk Dayıoğlu
- Men's 63 kg: (France) Cyrian Ravet
- Men's 68 kg: (Turkey) Ferhat Can Kavurat
- Men's 74 kg: Kadyrbech Daurov
- Men's 80 kg: (Bosnia and Herzegovina) Nedžad Husić
- Men's 87 kg: (Turkey) Enbiya Taha Biçer
- Men's 87+kg: (Poland) Mikołaj Szaferski

- Women's 46 kg: (Turkey) Emine Göğebakan
- Women's 49 kg: (Turkey) Elif Sude Akgül
- Women's 53 kg: (Saudi Arabia) Dunya Abutaleb
- Women's 57 kg: (United Kingdom) Jade Jones
- Women's 62 kg: (Croatia) Ivana Arelić
- Women's 67 kg: (Thailand) Sasikarn Tongchan
- Women's 73 kg: (France) Althéa Laurin
- Women's 73 kg+: (France) Solène Avoulètte

- February 9–10: Canada Open in Vancouver

- Men's 54 kg: (Canada) Nithan Brindamohan
- Men's 58 kg: (Australia) Bailey Lewis
- Men's 63 kg: (Hungary) Omar Salim
- Men's 68 kg: (Brazil) Joao Victor Souza
- Men's 74 kg: (United States) Noah Shanafelt
- Men's 80 kg: (Brazil) Henrique Rodrigues
- Men's 87 kg: (Brazil) Allif Souza
- Men's 87+kg: (Mexico) Carlos Sansores

- Women's 46 kg: (Australia) Bianca Motta
- Women's 49 kg: (United States) Maya Mata
- Women's 53 kg: (Chinese Taipei) Su Po-ya
- Women's 57 kg: (Brazil) Clara Maria Pacheco
- Women's 62 kg: (Serbia) Nadja Tesic
- Women's 67 kg: (Brazil) Milena Titoneli
- Women's 73 kg: (Puerto Rico) Crystal Weekes
- Women's 73 kg+: (United States) Naomi Alade

- February 12–15: Fajr Open in (Iran) Tehran

- Men's 54 kg: (Iran) Yasin Valizadeh Afroozi
- Men's 58 kg: (Iran) Mahdi Hajimousaei
- Men's 63 kg: (Iran) Amirabbas Rahnama Khanghah
- Men's 68 kg: (United States) ?
- Men's 74 kg: (Iran) Mahdi Kavousi
- Men's 80 kg: (Iran) Seyed Mohammad Amin Karimi
- Men's 87 kg: (Iran) Mirhashem Hosseini
- Men's 87+kg: (Pakistan) Hamzah Omar Saeed

- Women's 46 kg: (Iran) Masoumeh Ranjbar
- Women's 49 kg: (Iran) Maryam Malakoutikhah
- Women's 53 kg: (Iran) Ghazal Soltani
- Women's 57 kg: (Iran) Nahid Kiani
- Women's 62 kg: (Iran) Asma Sedaghat Mansoori
- Women's 67 kg: (Armenia) Nina Urganaeva
- Women's 73 kg: (Iran) Elham Haghighi
- Women's 73 kg+: (Iran) Niyousha Shadloo

- February 17–18: 2024 U.S. Open Taekwondo Championships in (United States) Reno

- Men's 54 kg: (Brazil) Giovanni Aubin de Moraes
- Men's 58 kg: (Brazil) Luiz Aquino
- Men's 63 kg: (Brazil) Gabriel Ramos
- Men's 68 kg: (Spain) Javier Pérez
- Men's 74 kg: (Ivory Coast) Christ Cedrick Bekah Seri
- Men's 80 kg: (South Korea) Seo Geon-woo
- Men's 87 kg: (Dominican Republic) Moisés Hernández
- Men's 87+kg: (United States) Jonathan Healy

- Women's 46 kg: (Australia) Bianca Motta
- Women's 49 kg: (Mexico) Daniela Souza
- Women's 53 kg: (Turkey) Merve Dinçel
- Women's 57 kg: (Athlete Refugee Team) Kimia Alizadeh
- Women's 62 kg: (Serbia) Nadja Tešić
- Women's 67 kg: (United States) Anastasija Zolotic
- Women's 73 kg: (Brazil) Raiany Pereira
- Women's 73 kg+: (Turkey) Nafia Kuş

- February 21–22: Asian Club Championships in (Iran) Tehran

- Men's 54 kg: (Iran) Aryan Arash
- Men's 58 kg: (Iran) Mahdi Hajimousaei
- Men's 63 kg: (Iran) Amirabbas Rahnama Khanghah
- Men's 68 kg: (Iran) Shayan Sohbati Toh Latifi
- Men's 74 kg: (Iran) Amir Sina Bakhtiari
- Men's 80 kg: (Iran) Mahdi Mohammadi Gavari
- Men's 87 kg: (Iran) Mohammad Hossein Yazdani
- Men's 87+kg: (Iran) Amir Mohammad Ghahremani

- Women's 46 kg: (Iran) Masoumeh Ranjbar
- Women's 49 kg: (Iran) Saeideh Nasiridarounkola
- Women's 53 kg: (Iran) Shaparak Najafi
- Women's 57 kg: (Iran) Aida Khorshidi
- Women's 62 kg: (Iran) Narges Mirnourollahi
- Women's 67 kg: (Iran) Yalda Valinejad
- Women's 73 kg: (Iran) Melika Mirhosseini
- Women's 73 kg+: (Iran) Asal Saberi

- February 24–25: Slovenia Open in Ljubljana

- Men's 54 kg: (Italy) Andrea Conti
- Men's 58 kg: (Netherlands) Milan Molle
- Men's 63 kg: (Chad) Casimir Betel
- Men's 68 kg: (Italy) Antonio Falco
- Men's 74 kg: (Slovenia) Lin Kovačič
- Men's 80 kg: Rustam Odinaev
- Men's 87 kg: (Serbia) Miloš Golubović
- Men's 87+kg: (Croatia) Ivan Šapina

- Women's 46 kg: (Italy) Elisa Bertagnin
- Women's 49 kg: (Croatia) Bruna Duvančić
- Women's 53 kg: (Croatia) Mia Tukić
- Women's 57 kg: (United Kingdom) Jade Jones
- Women's 62 kg: (Serbia) Nađa Savković
- Women's 67 kg: (Serbia) Aleksandra Perišić
- Women's 73 kg: (Croatia) Mila Mastelić
- Women's 73 kg+: (Germany) Esmeralda Husovic

- March 2–3: Bulgaria Open in Sofia

- Men's 54 kg: (Ukraine) Maksym Manenkov
- Men's 58 kg: Idar Bagov
- Men's 63 kg: Mikhail Artamonov
- Men's 68 kg: Ilia Danilov
- Men's 74 kg: Magomedrasul Omarov
- Men's 80 kg: (Chile) Joaquín Churchill Martínez
- Men's 87 kg: (Spain) Sergio Troitiño Amoedo
- Men's 87+kg: Rafail Aiukaev

- Women's 46 kg: (Spain) Zaraou Abdou
- Women's 49 kg: (Spain) Adriana Cerezo
- Women's 53 kg: (Spain) Elsa Hernández Vázquez
- Women's 57 kg: Margarita Blizniakova
- Women's 62 kg: (Serbia) Nadja Savković
- Women's 67 kg: (Spain) Lena Moreno Reyes
- Women's 73 kg: (United Kingdom) Lauren Williams
- Women's 73 kg+: Kristina Adebaio

- March 8–10: Puerto Rico Open in Guaynabo

- Event was cancelled

- March 16–17: Belgian Open in (Belgium) Lommel

- Men's 54 kg: (Italy) Andrea Conti
- Men's 58 kg: (Italy) Vito Dell'Aquila
- Men's 63 kg: (Spain) Joan Jorquera
- Men's 68 kg: (China) Xiao Chenming
- Men's 74 kg: (United Kingdom) Bradly Sinden
- Men's 80 kg: (Italy) Simone Alessio
- Men's 87 kg: (Spain) Sergio Troitiño Amoedo
- Men's 87+kg: (United Kingdom) Caden Cunningham

- Women's 46 kg: (Italy) Elisa Bertagnin
- Women's 49 kg: (China) Guo Qing
- Women's 53 kg: (Croatia) Mia Tukić
- Women's 57 kg: (Spain) Laura Rodríguez
- Women's 62 kg: (Serbia) Nadja Tešić
- Women's 67 kg: (China) Song Jie
- Women's 73 kg: (France) Bintou Diakité
- Women's 73 kg+: (Germany) Lorena Brandl

- March 30–31: Skopje Open Ramus in (North Macedonia) Skopje

- Men's 54 kg: (Ukraine) Maxym Manenkov
- Men's 58 kg: (Turkey) Enes Kaplan
- Men's 63 kg: (Poland) Mateusz Chrzanowski
- Men's 68 kg: (Croatia) Grga Dugac
- Men's 74 kg: (Serbia) Nikola Lukić
- Men's 80 kg: (Ukraine) Kostyantyn Kostenevych
- Men's 87 kg: (Slovenia) Patrik Divković
- Men's 87+kg: (North Macedonia) Dejan Georgievski

- Women's 46 kg: (Israel) Rivka Bayech
- Women's 49 kg: (Poland) Alicja Krajewska
- Women's 53 kg: (Serbia) Andrea Bokan
- Women's 57 kg: (Croatia) Ema Bugarinović
- Women's 62 kg: (North Macedonia) Miljana Reljiḱ
- Women's 67 kg: (Bosnia and Herzegovina) Nadina Mehmedović
- Women's 73 kg: (Serbia) Iva Petrović
- Women's 73 kg+: (France) Mouna Ouassou

- April 5–7: Spanish Open in (Spain) La Nucia

- Men's 54 kg: (Kazakhstan) Aziret Duisenbek
- Men's 58 kg: (France) Cyrian Ravet
- Men's 63 kg: (Thailand) Napat Sritimongkol
- Men's 68 kg: (France) Theo Lucien
- Men's 74 kg: (France) Lyve-Stone Celin
- Men's 80 kg: (Puerto Rico) Alejandro González
- Men's 87 kg: (Kazakhstan) Nurlan Myrzabayev
- Men's 87+kg: (Spain) Iván García Martínez

- Women's 46 kg: (Thailand) Patcharakan Poolkerd
- Women's 49 kg: (Thailand) Kamonchanok Seeken
- Women's 53 kg: (Chinese Taipei) Su Po-ya
- Women's 57 kg: (Spain) Laura Rodríguez Marquina
- Women's 62 kg: (Germany) Roja Rezaie
- Women's 67 kg: (Spain) Lena Moreno
- Women's 73 kg: (France) Althéa Laurin
- Women's 73 kg+: (Spain) Tania Castiñeira

- April 11–14: Egypt Open in Cairo
- April 12–14: 21st Galeb Belgrade Trophy - Serbia Open 2024 in Belgrade
- April 13–14: Dominican Open in (Dominican Republic) Santo Domingo
- April 25: Tallinn Open in (Estonia) Tallinn
- May 4–5: Rio Open in (Brazil) Rio de Janeiro
- May 17–19: Senegal Open in Dakar
- May 20–22: 6th Asian Taekwondo Open Championships in (Vietnam) Da Nang
- May 30–31: Ecuador Open in Riobamba
- June 8–9: Gorilla Open in (Rwanda) Kigali
- June 8–9: Lux Open in Luxembourg
- June 28–30: 3rd Solidarity Center Open in (France) Montargis
- July 1–3: Chuncheon 2024 World Taekwondo World Cup Team Championships Series in (South Korea) Chuncheon
- July 5–9: Daegu 2024 World Taekwondo University Festival in (South Korea) Daegu
- July 10–14: Chuncheon Korea Open in (South Korea) Chuncheon
- August 16–18: Kimunyong Cup International Open Taekwondo Championships in (South Korea) Muju
- September 12–14: 2024 Haikou Cup Hainan China Open Taekwondo Championships in Hainan
- September 14–15: Riga Open in (Latvia) Riga
- September 21–22: Australian Open in (Australia) Brisbane
- September 21–22: Polish Open in (Poland) Warsaw
- September 27–29: Kazakhstan Open in Astana
- September 28–29: Albania Open in Tirana
- October 5–6: Montenegro Podgorica Open in Podgorica
- October 10–12: Baghdad Open in (Iraq) Baghdad
- October 19–20: 51st Dutch Open Taekwondo Championships 2024 in (Netherlands) Eindhoven
- October 26–27: Dracula Open in (Romania) Bucharest
- October 26–29: Qatar Open in Doha
- November 1–3: Cyprus Open in Larnaka
- November 10–11: Israel Open in Jerusalem
- November 10–13: Mt. Everest International Open Taekwondo Championships in (Nepal) Lalitpur
- November 16–17: 28th Zagreb Croatia Open in Zagreb
- November 21–23: Palestine Open in Jericho
- November 24–25: Bosnia and Herzegovina Open 2024 in Sarajevo

=== World Taekwondo Poomsae Events ===
- February 8: Canada Open in Vancouver
- February 16: 2024 U.S. Open Taekwondo Championships in (United States) Reno
- March 4: Bulgaria Open in Sofia
- April 13: Dominican Open in (Dominican Republic) Santo Domingo
- May 23–24: 6th Asian Taekwondo Open Championships in (Vietnam) Da Nang
- June 1: Argentina Open in Buenos Aires
- June 1: Ecuador Open in Riobamba
- June 29–30: Austrian Open - Poomsae in (Austria) Vienna
- July 10–14: Chuncheon Korea Open in (South Korea) Chuncheon
- August 14–15: Kimunyong Cup International Open Taekwondo Championships in (South Korea) Muju
- September 15: 2024 Haikou Cup Hainan China Open Taekwondo Championships in Hainan
- September 22: Australian Open in (Australia) Brisbane
- October 12: 10th Croatia Open in Zaprešić
- October 19: Belgian Open in (Belgium) Lommel
- November 9: Mt. Everest International Open Taekwondo Poomsae Championships in (Nepal) Lalitpur

=== Other Events ===
- July 1–4: Chuncheon 2024 World Taekwondo Demonstration Team Championships in (South Korea) Chuncheon (poomsae)
- July 5–8: Daegu 2024 World Taekwondo University Festival in (South Korea) Daegu (kyorugi & poomsae)
- September 6–7: Muju Taekwondowon 2024 World Taekwondo Octagon Diamond Game in (South Korea) Muju

== Wrestling ==
- United World Wrestling Calendar

=== Olympic Games ===
- August 5–11: 2024 Summer Olympics in (France) Paris

=== World Championships ===
- August 19–25: 2024 World Cadet Wrestling Championships (U17) in (Jordan) Amman
- September 2–8: 2024 World Junior Wrestling Championships (U20) in (Spain) Pontevedra
- October 8–13: 2024 World Veterans Wrestling Championships in (Croatia) Poreč
- October 21–27: 2024 U23 World Wrestling Championships in (Albania) Tirana
- October 28–31: 2024 World Wrestling Championships in (Albania) Tirana

=== Area Games ===
- March 9–11: 2023 African Games in (Ghana) Accra
- April 12–14: Youth Bolivarian Games in (Bolivia) Sucre
- October 23–31: Gymnasiade in (Bahrain) Manama
- November 22–24: Asian Indoor and Martial Arts Games in (Thailand) Chonburi

=== Continental Championships ===
==== Senior ====
- February 6–7: 2024 Oceania Wrestling Championships in (Guam) Yona

- Men's freestyle

- Men's 57 kg winner: (New Zealand) Suraj Singh
- Men's 61 kg winner: (New Zealand) Kaige Lyndon Brown
- Men's 65 kg winner: (Australia) Georgii Okorokov
- Men's 70 kg winner: (Palau) Cristian Etpison Nicolescu
- Men's 74 kg winner: (Australia) Ethan James Thomas
- Men's 79 kg winner: (Guam) John Geronimo Butaud Rojas
- Men's 86 kg winner: (Australia) Jayden Lawrence
- Men's 92 kg winner: No competition
- Men's 97 kg winner: (Australia) Thomas Barns
- Men's 125 kg winner: (New Zealand) Marcus Carney

- Men's Greco Roman

- Men's 55 kg winner: No competition
- Men's 60 kg winner: No competition
- Men's 63 kg winner: No competition
- Men's 67 kg winner: (Samoa) Gaku Akazawa
- Men's 72 kg winner: No competition
- Men's 77 kg winner: (Nauru) Lowe Bingham
- Men's 82 kg winner: No competition
- Men's 87 kg winner: (American Samoa) Elias Lauofo Vaoifi
- Men's 97 kg winner: (Samoa) Maulao Alofipo
- Men's 130 kg winner: (New Zealand) Marcus Carney

- Women's freestyle

- Women's 50 kg winner: (Guam) Paulina Duenas
- Women's 53 kg winner: (Guam) Mia-Lahnee Aquino
- Women's 55 kg winner: No competition
- Women's 57 kg winner: (Guam) Rckaela Aquino
- Women's 59 kg winner: No competition
- Women's 62 kg winner: (Australia) Nachi Masuda
- Women's 65 kg winner: No competition
- Women's 68 kg winner: No competition
- Women's 72 kg winner: (Palau) Uilau Tarkong
- Women's 76 kg winner: No competition

- February 12–18: 2024 European Wrestling Championships in (Romania) Bucharest

- Men's freestyle

- Men's 57 kg winner: (Armenia) Arsen Harutyunyan
- Men's 61 kg winner: Abasgadzhi Magomedov
- Men's 65 kg winner: (Albania) Islam Dudaev
- Men's 70 kg winner: (Armenia) Arman Andreasyan
- Men's 74 kg winner: (Slovakia) Tajmuraz Salkazanov
- Men's 79 kg winner: Akhmed Usmanov
- Men's 86 kg winner: (Greece) Dauren Kurugliev
- Men's 92 kg winner: (Turkey) Feyzullah Aktürk
- Men's 97 kg winner: (Georgia (country)) Givi Matcharashvili
- Men's 125 kg winner: (Turkey) Taha Akgül

- Men's Greco Roman

- Men's 55 kg winner: (Moldova) Artiom Deleanu
- Men's 60 kg winner: (Azerbaijan) Nihat Mammadli
- Men's 63 kg winner: (Azerbaijan) Murad Mammadov
- Men's 67 kg winner: (Azerbaijan) Hasrat Jafarov
- Men's 72 kg winner: (Turkey) Selçuk Can
- Men's 77 kg winner: (Armenia) Malkhas Amoyan
- Men's 82 kg winner: (Turkey) Alperen Berber
- Men's 87 kg winner: (Serbia) Aleksandr Komarov
- Men's 97 kg winner: (Armenia) Artur Aleksanyan
- Men's 130 kg winner: Sergey Semenov

- Women's freestyle

- Women's 50 kg winner: (Azerbaijan) Mariya Stadnik
- Women's 53 kg winner: Vanesa Kaladzinskaya
- Women's 55 kg winner: (Romania) Andreea Ana
- Women's 57 kg winner: Iryna Kurachkina
- Women's 59 kg winner: (Azerbaijan) Alyona Kolesnik
- Women's 62 kg winner: (Norway) Grace Bullen
- Women's 65 kg winner: (Ukraine) Iryna Koliadenko
- Women's 68 kg winner: (Turkey) Buse Tosun Çavuşoğlu
- Women's 72 kg winner: (Turkey) Nesrin Baş
- Women's 76 kg winner: (Turkey) Yasemin Adar Yiğit

- February 21–24: 2024 Pan American Wrestling Championships in (Mexico) Acapulco

- Men's freestyle

- Men's 57 kg winner: (United States) Spencer Lee
- Men's 61 kg winner: (United States) Nick Suriano
- Men's 65 kg winner: (United States) Nicholas Lee
- Men's 70 kg winner: (United States) Alec Pantaleo
- Men's 74 kg winner: (United States) Kyle Dake
- Men's 79 kg winner: (United States) Alexander Facundo
- Men's 86 kg winner: (United States) Chandler Marsteller
- Men's 92 kg winner: (United States) Nathan Jackson
- Men's 97 kg winner: (United States) Kyle Snyder
- Men's 125 kg winner: (United States) Mason Parris

- Men's Greco Roman

- Men's 55 kg winner: (Mexico) Marco Antonio García
- Men's 60 kg winner: (Venezuela) Raiber Rodríguez
- Men's 63 kg winner: (United States) Hayden Daniel Tuma
- Men's 67 kg winner: (United States) Alejandro Sancho
- Men's 72 kg winner: (Mexico) Alexis Abraham Ramirez
- Men's 77 kg winner: (Colombia) Jair Cuero
- Men's 82 kg winner: (Brazil) Sosruko Kodzokov
- Men's 87 kg winner: (Cuba) Daniel Grégorich
- Men's 97 kg winner: (Honduras) Kevin Mejia
- Men's 130 kg winner: (Chile) Yasmani Acosta

- Women's freestyle

- Women's 50 kg winner: (Ecuador) Jacqueline Mollocana
- Women's 53 kg winner: (Ecuador) Lucía Yépez
- Women's 55 kg winner: (United States) Alisha Sue Howk
- Women's 57 kg winner: (United States) Helen Maroulis
- Women's 59 kg winner: (Canada) Laurence Beauregard
- Women's 62 kg winner: (United States) Kayla Miracle
- Women's 65 kg winner: (United States) Macey Kilty
- Women's 68 kg winner: (Canada) Olivia Di Bacco
- Women's 72 kg winner: (United States) Brooklyn Hays
- Women's 76 kg winner: (Ecuador) Génesis Reasco

- March 14–19: 2024 African Wrestling Championships in (Egypt) Alexandria

- Men's freestyle

- Men's 57 kg winner: (Guinea-Bissau) Diamantino Iuna Fafé
- Men's 61 kg winner: (Algeria) Abdelhak Kherbache
- Men's 65 kg winner: (Egypt) Shehabeldin Mohamed
- Men's 70 kg winner: (Algeria) Abderrahmane Benaissa
- Men's 74 kg winner: (Guinea-Bissau) Bacar N'Dum
- Men's 79 kg winner: (Algeria) Chems Fetairia
- Men's 86 kg winner: (Egypt) Mohamed Ahmed Abdelaal
- Men's 92 kg winner: (Egypt) Mohamed Mostafa Salaheldin
- Men's 97 kg winner: (Senegal) Pape N’Diaye
- Men's 125 kg winner: (Egypt) Youssif Hemida

- Men's Greco Roman

- Men's 55 kg winner: (Egypt) Shaaban Abdellatif
- Men's 60 kg winner: (Egypt) Haithem Mahmoud
- Men's 63 kg winner: (Egypt) Adham Ayman El Sayed
- Men's 67 kg winner: (Egypt) Moustafa Alameldin
- Men's 72 kg winner: (Tunisia) Radhwen Tarhouni
- Men's 77 kg winner: (Egypt) Mohamed Zahab Khalil
- Men's 82 kg winner: (Egypt) Mahmoud Walid Ibrahim
- Men's 87 kg winner: (Egypt) Noureldin Hassan
- Men's 97 kg winner: (Egypt) Emad Abouelatta
- Men's 130 kg winner: (Egypt) Abdellatif Mohamed

- Women's freestyle

- Women's 50 kg winner: (Nigeria) Mercy Genesis
- Women's 53 kg winner: (Nigeria) Christianah Ogunsanya
- Women's 55 kg winner: (Nigeria) Adijat Idris
- Women's 57 kg winner: (Nigeria) Odunayo Adekuoroye
- Women's 59 kg winner: (Nigeria) Mercy Adekuoroye
- Women's 62 kg winner: (Nigeria) Esther Kolawole
- Women's 65 kg winner: (Nigeria) Ebipatei Mughenbofa
- Women's 68 kg winner: (Nigeria) Blessing Oborududu
- Women's 72 kg winner: (Nigeria) Ebi Biogos
- Women's 76 kg winner: (Tunisia) Zaineb Sghaier

- April 11–16: 2024 Asian Wrestling Championships in (Kyrgyzstan) Bishkek

- Men's freestyle

- Men's 57 kg winner: (Japan) Kento Yumiya
- Men's 61 kg winner: (Kyrgyzstan) Taiyrbek Zhumashbek Uulu
- Men's 65 kg winner: (Iran) Rahman Amouzad
- Men's 70 kg winner: (Iran) Amir Mohammad Yazdani
- Men's 74 kg winner: (Japan) Kota Takahashi
- Men's 79 kg winner: (Iran) Mohammad Nokhodi
- Men's 86 kg winner: (Kazakhstan) Azamat Dauletbekov
- Men's 92 kg winner: (Iran) Amir Hossein Firouzpour
- Men's 97 kg winner: (Bahrain) Akhmed Tazhudinov
- Men's 125 kg winner: (Iran) Amir Hossein Zare

- Men's Greco Roman

- Men's 55 kg winner: (North Korea) Ro Yu-chol
- Men's 60 kg winner: (Kyrgyzstan) Zholaman Sharshenbekov
- Men's 63 kg winner: (Kazakhstan) Yerzhet Zharlykassyn
- Men's 67 kg winner: (Iran) Saeid Esmaeili
- Men's 72 kg winner: (Japan) Shingo Harada
- Men's 77 kg winner: (Japan) Nao Kusaka
- Men's 82 kg winner: (Japan) Taizo Yoshida
- Men's 87 kg winner: (Iran) Nasser Alizadeh
- Men's 97 kg winner: (Iran) Mohammad Hadi Saravi
- Men's 130 kg winner: (Iran) Amin Mirzazadeh

- Women's freestyle

- Women's 50 kg winner: (Japan) Yui Susaki
- Women's 53 kg winner: (North Korea) Kim Ji-hyang
- Women's 55 kg winner: (Japan) Moe Kiyooka
- Women's 57 kg winner: (China) Feng Yongxin
- Women's 59 kg winner: (China) Zhang Qi
- Women's 62 kg winner: (Kyrgyzstan) Aisuluu Tynybekova
- Women's 65 kg winner: (Japan) Mahiro Yoshitake
- Women's 68 kg winner: (Japan) Nonoka Ozaki
- Women's 72 kg winner: (China) Jiang Qian
- Women's 76 kg winner: (Kyrgyzstan) Aiperi Medet Kyzy

==== Junior ====
- February 6–7: 2024 U17, U20 Oceania Wrestling Championships in (Guam) Yona
- March 14–19: 2024 U17, U20 African Wrestling Championships in (Egypt) Alexandria
- May 15–18: 2024 U15 European Wrestling Championships in (Greece) Loutraki
- May 20–26: 2024 U23 European Wrestling Championships in (Azerbaijan) Baku
- June 13–15: 2024 U15 Pan-American Wrestling Championships in (El Salvador) San Salvador
- June 21–22: 2024 U23 Pan-American Wrestling Championships in (Colombia) Rionegro
- June 22–30: 2024 U17, U23 Asian Wrestling Championships in (Jordan) Amman
- June 24 – July: 2024 U17 & U20 European Wrestling Championships in (Serbia) Novi Sad
- June 27–29: 2024 U17 Pan-American Wrestling Championships in (Dominican Republic) Santo Domingo
- July 11–13: 2024 U20 Pan-American Wrestling Championships in (Peru) Lima
- July 16–24: 2024 U15, U20 Asian Wrestling Championships in (Saudi Arabia) Riyadh

=== 2024 Wrestling Ranking Series ===
- 10–14 January: 1st Ranking Series: 2024 Grand Prix Zagreb Open in (Croatia) Zagreb

- Men's Freestyle

- Men's 57 kg winner: Aman Sehrawat
- Men's 61 kg winner: (Mongolia) Erdenebatyn Bekhbayar
- Men's 65 kg winner: (Armenia) Vazgen Tevanyan
- Men's 70 kg winner: (Armenia) Akaki Kemertelidze
- Men's 74 kg winner: (United States) Jason Nolf
- Men's 79 kg winner: (Iran) Mohammad Nokhodi
- Men's 86 kg winner: (Bulgaria) Magomed Ramazanov
- Men's 92 kg winner: (United States) Nathan Jackson
- Men's 97 kg winner: (Iran) Amir Ali Azarpira
- Men's 125 kg winner: (Iran) Amir Hossein Zare

- Men's Greco Roman

- Men's 55 kg winner: (Turkey) Adem Uzun
- Men's 60 kg winner: Sadyk Lalaev
- Men's 63 kg winner: (Georgia (country)) Leri Abuladze
- Men's 67 kg winner: (Ukraine) Parviz Nasibov
- Men's 72 kg winner: (Azerbaijan) Ulvu Ganizade
- Men's 77 kg winner: (Azerbaijan) Sanan Suleymanov
- Men's 82 kg winner: (Hungary) Erik Szilvássy
- Men's 87 kg winner: Milad Alirzaev
- Men's 97 kg winner: Abubakar Khaslakhanau
- Men's 130 kg winner: (Iran) Fardin Hedayati

- Women's Freestyle

- Women's 50 kg winner: (Japan) Yui Susaki
- Women's 53 kg winner: (China) Pang Qianyu
- Women's 55 kg winner: (Canada) Samantha Stewart
- Women's 57 kg winner: (China) Hong Kexin
- Women's 59 kg winner: (Ukraine) Alina Filipovych
- Women's 62 kg winner: (Kyrgyzstan) Aisuluu Tynybekova
- Women's 65 kg winner: (Ukraine) Alla Belinska
- Women's 68 kg winner: (China) Zhou Feng
- Women's 72 kg winner: (Ukraine) Iryna Zablotska
- Women's 76 kg winner: (Kyrgyzstan) Aiperi Medet Kyzy

- 6–9 June: 2nd Ranking Series: 2024 Polyák Imre & Varga János Memorial Tournament in (Hungary) Budapest

=== 2024 Wrestling International Tournaments ===
- 19–21 January: 2024 Grand Prix de France Henri Deglane in Nice

- Men's Freestyle

- Men's 57 kg winner: (Mexico) Roman Bravo-Young
- Men's 61 kg winner: (France) Arman Eloyan
- Men's 65 kg winner: (United States) Aden Valencia
- Men's 70 kg winner: (France) Seyfulla Itaev
- Men's 74 kg winner: (Spain) Mohammad Mottaghinia
- Men's 79 kg winner: (Germany) Pouria Taherkhani
- Men's 86 kg winner: (Greece) Dauren Kurugliev
- Men's 92 kg winner: (United States) Camden McDanel
- Men's 97 kg winner: (United States) Michael Macchiavello
- Men's 125 kg winner: (United States) Hayden Zillmer

- Men's Greco Roman

- Men's 55 kg winner: (Georgia (country)) Giorgi Tokhadze
- Men's 60 kg winner: (Georgia (country)) Romeo Beridze
- Men's 63 kg winner: (Georgia (country)) Rati Khozrevanidze
- Men's 67 kg winner: (France) Tigran Galustyan
- Men's 72 kg winner: (Georgia (country)) Giorgi Chkhikvadze
- Men's 77 kg winner: (Denmark) Oliver Marco Krüger
- Men's 82 kg winner: (Georgia (country)) Gela Bolkvadze
- Men's 87 kg winner: (Georgia (country)) Gurami Khetsuriani
- Men's 97 kg winner: (Georgia (country)) Robert Kobliashvili
- Men's 130 kg winner: (Georgia (country)) Saba Chilashvili

- Women's

- Women's 50 kg winner: (Canada) Katie Dutchak
- Women's 53 kg winner: (Sweden) Jonna Malmgren
- Women's 57 kg winner: (Brazil) Giullia Penalber
- Women's 62 kg winner: (Brazil) Laís Nunes
- Women's 65 kg winner: (France) Iris Thiébaux
- Women's 68 kg winner: (United States) Kaylynn Albrecht
- Women's 72 kg winner: (Brazil) Thamires Machado
- Women's 76 kg winner: (United States) Yelena Makoyed

- 2–4 February: 2024 Flatz Austria Open in Wolfurt

- Women's

- Women's 50 kg winner: (Switzerland) Svenja Jungo
- Women's 53 kg winner: (Italy) Fabiana Rinella
- Women's 55 kg winner: (Italy) Immacolata Danise
- Women's 57 kg winner: (Poland) Patrycja Strzelczyk
- Women's 59 kg winner: (Hungary) Viktoria Borsos
- Women's 62 kg winner: (Norway) Mirijam Lindaas Hansen
- Women's 65 kg winner: (Poland) Alicja Nowosad
- Women's 68 kg winner: (Hungary) Karolina Pok
- Women's 72 kg winner: (Croatia) Gia Kastelan
- Women's 76 kg winner: (Germany) Lotta Englich

- 16–18 February: 2024 Klippan Lady Open in (Sweden) Klippan

- Women's

- Women's 50 kg winner: (Japan) Miruko Sakane
- Women's 53 kg winner: (Poland) Magdalena Głodek
- Women's 55 kg winner: (Germany) Josefine Purschke
- Women's 57 kg winner: (Japan) Sowaka Uchida
- Women's 59 kg winner: (Germany) Luna Rothenberger
- Women's 62 kg winner: (Japan) Konami Ono
- Women's 65 kg winner: (Germany) Vanja Gersak Peréz
- Women's 68 kg winner: (Japan) Momoko Kitade
- Women's 72 kg winner: (Germany) Lilly Schneider
- Women's 76 kg winner: (Egypt) Samar Amer Ibrahim

- 1–3 March: 2024 Thor Masters Tournament in (Denmark) Nykobing Falster

- Men's Greco Roman

- Men's 60 kg winner: (Germany) Etienne Kinsinger
- Men's 63 kg winner: (Moldova) Vitalie Eriomenco
- Men's 67 kg winner: (Norway) Morten Thoresen
- Men's 72 kg winner: (Lithuania) Vilius Savickas
- Men's 77 kg winner: (Serbia) Viktor Nemeš
- Men's 82 kg winner: (Croatia) Filip Šačić
- Men's 87 kg winner: (Denmark) Turpal Bisultanov
- Men's 97 kg winner: (Hungary) Alex Szőke
- Men's 130 kg winner: (Lithuania) Mantas Knystautas

- 7–10 March: 2024 Dan Kolov & Nikola Petrov Tournament in (Bulgaria) Sofia

- Men's Freestyle

- Men's 57 kg winner: (Ukraine) Andrii Yatsenko
- Men's 61 kg winner: (Serbia) Stevan Mićić
- Men's 65 kg winner: (Iran) Abbas Ebrahimzadeh
- Men's 70 kg winner: (Ukraine) Ivan Kusyak
- Men's 74 kg winner: (Bulgaria) Ramazan Ramazanov
- Men's 79 kg winner: (Bulgaria) Radomir Stoyanov
- Men's 86 kg winner: (United States) Alex Dieringer
- Men's 92 kg winner: (Iran) Mohammad Azimi
- Men's 97 kg winner: (South Korea) Juhwan Seo
- Men's 125 kg winner: (Bulgaria) Georgi Ivanov

- Men's Greco Roman

- Men's 55 kg winner: (Kazakhstan) Marlan Mukashev
- Men's 60 kg winner: (Ukraine) Oleksii Masyk
- Men's 63 kg winner: (Kazakhstan) Dias Askerbay
- Men's 67 kg winner: (France) Mamadassa Sylla
- Men's 72 kg winner: (Kazakhstan) Adilkhan Satayev
- Men's 77 kg winner: (Iran) Gholam Reza Farokhi
- Men's 82 kg winner: (Iran) Mohammad Naghousi
- Men's 87 kg winner: (Bulgaria) Semen Novikov
- Men's 97 kg winner: (Iran) Amirreza Akbari

- Women's

- Women's 50 kg winner: (South Korea) Miran Cheon
- Women's 53 kg winner: Ekaterina Poleshchuk
- Women's 55 kg winner: (Bulgaria) Sezen Belberova
- Women's 57 kg winner: (South Korea) Kwon Young-jin
- Women's 59 kg winner: (Bulgaria) Evelina Nikolova
- Women's 62 kg winner: (China) Xinyuan Sun
- Women's 65 kg winner: (Romania) Kateryna Zelenykh
- Women's 68 kg winner: (Bulgaria) Yuliana Yaneva
- Women's 72 kg winner: (Bulgaria) Vanesa Georgieva
- Women's 76 kg winner: (United States) Dymond Guilford

- 7–8 March: 2024 Vehbi Emre & Hamit Kaplan Tournament in (Turkey) Antalya

- Men's Greco Roman

- Men's 55 kg winner: (Iran) Pouya Dadmarz
- Men's 60 kg winner: (Kyrgyzstan) Zholaman Sharshenbekov
- Men's 63 kg winner: Zhambolat Lokyaev
- Men's 67 kg winner: (Iran) Saeid Esmaeili
- Men's 72 kg winner: Dmitrii Adamov
- Men's 77 kg winner: (Iran) Amin Kavianinejad
- Men's 82 kg winner: Stanislau Shafarenka
- Men's 87 kg winner: Milad Alirzaev
- Men's 97 kg winner: (Iran) Mohammad Hadi Saravi
- Men's 130 kg winner: (Finland) Elias Kuosmanen

- 7–10 March: 2024 Yasar Dogu Tournament in (Turkey) Antalya

- Men's Freestyle

- Men's 57 kg winner: (Kyrgyzstan) Bekzat Almaz Uulu
- Men's 61 kg winner: (Japan) Masanosuke Ono
- Men's 65 kg winner: (Kyrgyzstan) Ulukbek Zholdoshbekov
- Men's 70 kg winner: (Kyrgyzstan) Ernazar Akmataliev
- Men's 74 kg winner: (United States) Jordan Burroughs
- Men's 79 kg winner: (Bahrain) Khidir Saipudinov
- Men's 86 kg winner: (Iran) Hadi Vafaeipour
- Men's 92 kg winner: (Iran) Amir Hossein Firouzpour
- Men's 97 kg winner: (Bahrain) Akhmed Tazhudinov
- Men's 125 kg winner: (Bulgaria) Amir Reza Masoumi

- Women's

- Women's 50 kg winner: (Japan) Umi Ito
- Women's 53 kg winner: (Mongolia) Bat-Ochiryn Bolortuyaa
- Women's 55 kg winner: Ekaterina Verbina
- Women's 57 kg winner: Olga Khoroshavtseva
- Women's 59 kg winner: (Japan) Miyu Nakanishi
- Women's 62 kg winner: (Kyrgyzstan) Aisuluu Tynybekova
- Women's 65 kg winner: (Japan) Mahiro Yoshitake
- Women's 68 kg winner: (Mongolia) Enkhsaikhany Delgermaa
- Women's 72 kg winner: (Japan) Sumire Niikura
- Women's 76 kg winner: (Kyrgyzstan) Aiperi Medet Kyzy

- 24–27 May: 2024 Muhamet Malo Tournament in (Albania) Tirana

- Men's Freestyle

- Men's 57 kg winner: (Kazakhstan) Okenov Abzal
- Men's 61 kg winner: (Moldova) Leomid Colesnic
- Men's 65 kg winner: (Albania) Zelimkhan Abakarov
- Men's 70 kg winner: (Kazakhstan) Seidakhmet Sungkar
- Men's 74 kg winner: (Albania) Chermen Valiev
- Men's 79 kg winner: (Kazakhstan) Nurlybekov Myrzabek
- Men's 86 kg winner: (Italy) Gabriele Niccolini
- Men's 92 kg winner: (Kazakhstan) Bekzat Amangali
- Men's 97 kg winner: (Ecuador) Luis Villagómez
- Men's 125 kg winner: (Moldova) Gheorghe Erhan

- Men's Greco Roman

- Men's 55 kg winner: (Kazakhstan) Yerassyl Mamyrbekov
- Men's 60 kg winner: (Moldova) Artion Delenau
- Men's 63 kg winner: (Kazakhstan) Nurgali Sagatov
- Men's 67 kg winner: (Kazakhstan) Daulet Ashirkhanov
- Men's 72 kg winner: (Moldova) Mihai Petic
- Men's 77 kg winner: (Bulgaria) Stoian Kubatov
- Men's 82 kg winner: (Bulgaria) Rosian Dermanski
- Men's 87 kg winner: (Kazakhstan) Shamil Ozhaev
- Men's 97 kg winner: (Bulgaria) Ioan Dimitrov
- Men's 130 kg winner: (Saudi Arabia) Rayan Hassan Mohammed

- 7–8 June: 2024 Pat Shaw Memorial Tournament in Guatemala City
- 14–15 June: 2024 Sassari City Matteo Pellicone Memorial Tournament in (Italy) Sassari
- 14–15 June: 2024 Ljubomir Ivanovic Gedza Memorial Tournament in (Serbia) Mladenovac
- 18–20 June: 2024 Stepan Sargsyan Cup in (Armenia) Yerevan
- 19–23 June: 2024 Ziolkowski, Pytlasinski, Poland Open in Warsaw
- 28–30 June: 2024 Macedonian Pearl Tournament in (North Macedonia) Skopje
- July 2–7: 2024 East Africa Wrestling Championship in (Kenya) Nairobi
- 5–7 July: 2024 Grand Prix of Spain in Madrid
- 25–29 September: 2024 Southeast Asian and Oceania Wrestling Tournament in (Thailand) Chiang Mai
- 3–5 November: 2024 Kunayev D.A. Tournament in (Kazakhstan) Taraz
- 22–23 November: 2024 Ibrahim Moustafa Tournament in (Egypt) Cairo
- 22–24 November: 2024 Korea Open in (South Korea) Sangju
- 30 November: 2024 Haparanda Cup in (Sweden) Haparanda
- 7 December: 2024 Arvo Haavisto Tournament in (Finland) Ilmajoki
- 21–22 December: 2024 Arab Championship in (Tunisia) Tunis

=== Olympic Qualification Tournaments ===
- February 28 – March 1: Pan American Qualification Tournament in (Mexico) Acapulco
- March 22–24: African & Oceania Qualification Tournament in (Egypt) Alexandria
- April 5–7: European Qualification Tournament in (Azerbaijan) Baku
- April 19–21: Asian Qualification Tournament in (Kyrgyzstan) Bishkek
- May 9–12: World Qualification Tournament in (Turkey) Istanbul

=== UWW Junior International Tournaments ===
- February 2–4: Flatz Austria Open in Wolfurt

- Results

- February 16–18: Klippan Lady Open in (Sweden) Klippan

- Results

- February 24: Croatia Open in Zagreb

- Results

- March 11–13: Zhaksylyk Ushkempirov in (Kazakhstan) Astana

- Results

- March 12–14: Victory Cup in (Turkey) Antalya

- Results

- March 16: Refik Memišević Brale in (Serbia) Subotica

- Results

- March 16–18: Champions in (Turkey) Antalya

- Results

- April 19–21: Ioan Muresan and Valeriu Bularca in (Romania) Cluj-Napoca
- April 20–21: Jovenes Promesas in (Spain) La Nucia
- April 26–28: Petko Sirakov - Ivan Iliev in (Bulgaria) Sofia
- May 4–5: Nordic Championships in (Sweden) Helsingborg
- May 10–12: Constantin Alexandru and Ioan W. Popovici in (Romania) Bucharest
- May 11: Adriatic Trophy in (Croatia) Poreč
- May 23–25: Arab Championship in (Jordan) Amman
- May 24–26: Skhireli Cup in (Georgia (country)) Gori
- May 31 – June 2: Dumitru Pirvulescu and Vasile Iorga in (Romania) Bucharest
- June 7–8: Pat Shaw Memorial (REDT) in Guatemala City
- June 14–15: Sassari City Matteo Pellicone Memorial in (Italy) Sassari
- July 2–5: Arab Championship in (Algeria) Algiers
- July 2–7: East Africa Wrestling Championship in (Kenya) Nairobi
- August 17–18: Druskininkai Cup in (Lithuania) Druskininkai
- September 19–22: Ion Cornianu and Ladislau Simon in (Romania) Bucharest
- September 25–29: Southeast Asian and Oceania Wrestling Tournament in (Thailand) Chiang Mai
- September 28: Valamar Cup in (Croatia) Poreč
- October 3–6: Balkan Championships in (North Macedonia) Skopje

== Wushu ==
=== International Championships ===
- August 21–28: 2024 World Taijiquan Championships in Singapore
- September 22–30: 2024 World Junior Wushu Championships in (Brunei) Bandar Seri Begawan
- October 24–28: Taolu World Cup in (Japan) Yokohama
- November 22–25: Sanda World Cup in (Australia) Melbourne
