= Taekwondo at the 2024 Summer Olympics – Qualification =

This article details the qualifying phase for taekwondo at the 2024 Summer Olympics. The competition at these Games will comprise a total of 128 taekwondo fighters coming from their respective NOCs; each can enter a maximum of eight taekwondo fighters, with one in each bodyweight category and four for each gender.

Host nation France reserves two men's and women's spots either through the WT Olympic Rankings or WT Grand Slam Champions Series, while four more places are entitled to the eligible NOCs interested to have their taekwondo practitioners compete in Paris 2024 through the Tripartite Commission Invitation.

The remainder of the total quota will be attributed to the taekwondo fighters through a dual qualification pathway. Five quota places will be awarded to the top-ranked practitioners in each of the eight weight classes (four per gender) through the World Taekwondo (WT) Olympic Rankings, while the highest of each weight category on merit points standing will grant one quota place each for their respective NOC through the WT Grand Slam Champions Series, scheduled for December 16–17, 2023 in Wuxi, China. The NOC containing at least two female or male taekwondo fighters through the ranking is deemed ineligible to participate in the respective Continental Qualification Tournament unless it relinquishes the places obtained.

At the beginning of the 2024 season, five continental qualification tournaments will offer the majority of the berths to the top two taekwondo fighters of each weight category from Africa, the Americas, Asia, and Europe; and to the highest-ranked from Oceania.

== Timeline ==
Event	Date	Venue
WT Olympic Rankings	December 3, 2023	—
WT Grand Slam Series Rankings	December 17, 2023	—
African Qualification Tournament	February 10–11, 2024	Dakar, Senegal
European Qualification Tournament	March 9–10, 2024	Sofia, Bulgaria
Asian Qualification Tournament	March 15–16, 2024	Tai'an, China
Oceania Qualification Tournament	April 6, 2024	Honiara, Solomon Islands
Pan American Qualification Tournament	April 9–10, 2024	Santo Domingo, Dominican Republic

== Qualification summary ==
The following table summarizes the qualification outcome for the taekwondo tournament at the 2024 Summer Olympics.

NOC	Men				Women				Total
NOC	−58 kg	−68 kg	−80 kg	+80 kg	−49 kg	−57 kg	−67 kg	+67 kg	Total
Argentina	Yes								1
Australia	Yes		Yes			Yes			3
Austria								Yes	1
Azerbaijan	Yes								1
Belgium							Yes		1
Brazil		Yes	Yes			Yes	Yes		4
Bulgaria						Yes			1
Burkina Faso		Yes	Yes						2
Canada					Yes	Yes			2
Chile			Yes					Yes	2
China		Yes		Yes	Yes	Yes	Yes	Yes	6
Chinese Taipei						Yes			1
Croatia		Yes		Yes	Yes				3
Cuba				Yes				Yes	2
Czech Republic						Yes		Yes	2
Denmark			Yes						1
Dominican Republic		Yes					Yes		2
Timor-Leste					Yes				1
Egypt		Yes	Yes				Yes		3
Fiji							Yes	Yes	2
France	Yes	Yes					Yes	Yes	4
Gabon						Yes			1
The Gambia				Yes					1
Germany								Yes	1
Great Britain		Yes		Yes		Yes		Yes	4
Guinea-Bissau				Yes					1
Hong Kong		Yes							1
Hungary	Yes	Yes					Yes		3
Individual Neutral Athletes	Yes								1
Ireland	Yes								1
Iran			Yes	Yes	Yes	Yes			4
Israel					Yes				1
Italy	Yes		Yes		Yes				3
Ivory Coast				Yes			Yes	Yes	3
Jordan		Yes	Yes				Yes	Yes	4
Kazakhstan	Yes		Yes						2
Lebanon						Yes			1
Lesotho					Yes				1
Mali			Yes						1
Mexico				Yes	Yes				2
Morocco					Yes			Yes	2
Niger	Yes			Yes					2
Nigeria							Yes		1
North Macedonia						Yes			1
Norway				Yes					1
Papua New Guinea		Yes		Yes					2
Palestine	Yes								1
Refugee Olympic Team	Yes	Yes	Yes	Yes	Yes				5
Saudi Arabia					Yes				1
Senegal	Yes								1
Serbia	Yes		Yes				Yes		3
Slovenia				Yes					1
South Korea	Yes		Yes			Yes		Yes	4
Spain	Yes	Yes			Yes		Yes		4
Tajikistan								Yes	1
Thailand		Yes			Yes		Yes		3
Tunisia	Yes		Yes		Yes	Yes			4
Turkey		Yes		Yes	Yes	Yes		Yes	5
United States			Yes	Yes		Yes	Yes		4
Uruguay					Yes				1
Uzbekistan		Yes	Yes	Yes			Yes	Yes	5
Venezuela	Yes								1
Total: 60 NOCs	18	17	17	17	17	16	16	16	134

== Men's events ==
Quota places are allocated to the respective NOC and not necessarily to the taekwondo practitioner achieving the place in the qualification event.

=== −58 kg ===
Event	Places	Qualified athletes
WT Olympic Rankings (as of December 3, 2023)	5	Mohamed Khalil Jendoubi (TUN); Adrián Vicente (ESP); Jang Jun (KOR); Vito Dell'Aquila (ITA); Omar Salim (HUN)
WT Grand Slam Series Rankings	1	Gashim Magomedov (AZE)
African Qualification Tournament	2	Nouridine Issaka (NIG); Bocar Diop (SEN)
European Qualification Tournament	2+1	Jack Woolley (IRL); Georgii Gurtsiev (AIN) (Note: Georgii Gurtsiev originally earned a quota place at the European Qualification Tournament, but was rejected by the IOC. His spot has been replaced by Serbia, the nation of the next best-ranked athlete. Later that decision was reverted and both athletes were allowed to participate.); Lev Korneev (SRB)
Asian Qualification Tournament	2	Omar Hantoli (PLE); Samirkhon Ababakirov (KAZ)
Oceania Qualification Tournament	1	Bailey Lewis (AUS)
Pan American Qualification Tournament	2	Yohandri Granado (VEN); Lucas Guzmán (ARG)
Host nation / Universality places	1	Cyrian Ravet (FRA)
Additional	1	Hadi Tiran (EOR)
Total	18	

=== −68 kg ===
Event	Places	Qualified athletes
WT Olympic Rankings (as of December 3, 2023)	5	Ulugbek Rashitov (UZB); Bradly Sinden (GBR); Hakan Reçber (TUR); Zaid Kareem (JOR); Javier Pérez (ESP)
WT Grand Slam Series Rankings	1	Liang Yushuai (CHN)
African Qualification Tournament	2	Ahmed Nassar (EGY); Ibrahim Maïga (BUR)
European Qualification Tournament	2	Marko Golubić (CRO); Levente Józsa (HUN)
Asian Qualification Tournament	2	Banlung Tubtimdang (THA); Lo Wai Fung (HKG) (Note: Ali Reza Abbasi from the refugee team originally won the quota but was later ruled ineligible.)
Oceania Qualification Tournament	1	Kevin Kassman (PNG) (Note: Eisa Mozhdeh (men's 68 kg) and Jemesa Landers (women's 67 kg), originally won the Oceania Qualification Tournament and an Olympic berth for New Zealand but the New Zealand Olympic Committee (NZOC) resigned two quota spots due to Taekwondo New Zealand Federation not being a member and its not recognized by the NZOC.)
Pan American Qualification Tournament	2	Edival Pontes (BRA); Bernardo Pié (DOM)
Host nation / Universality places	1	Souleyman Alaphilippe (FRA)
Additional	1	Yahya Al-Ghotany (EOR)
Total	17	

=== −80 kg ===
Event	Places	Qualified athletes
WT Olympic Rankings (as of December 3, 2023)	5	Simone Alessio (ITA); CJ Nickolas (USA); Seif Eissa (EGY); Seo Geon-woo (KOR); Saleh El-Sharabaty (JOR)
WT Grand Slam Series Rankings	1	Mehran Barkhordari (IRI)
African Qualification Tournament	2	Faysal Sawadogo (BUR); Firas Katoussi (TUN)
European Qualification Tournament	2	Edi Hrnic (DEN); Stefan Takov (SRB) (Note: Russian athletes Maksim Khramtsov (men's 80 kg), Tatiana Minina (women's 57 kg) and Polina Khan (women's +67 kg) originally qualified at the European Qualification Tournament but the IOC did not declare them neutral and they were not invited to the Games. Their spots have been replaced by the third-ranked athletes.)
Asian Qualification Tournament	2	Jasurbek Jaysunov (UZB); Batyrkhan Toleugali (KAZ)
Oceania Qualification Tournament	1	Leon Sejranovic (AUS)
Pan American Qualification Tournament	2	Joaquín Churchill (CHI); Henrique Marques (BRA)
Host nation / Universality places	1	Ismaël Coulibaly (MLI)
Additional	1	Farzad Mansouri (EOR)
Total	17	

=== +80 kg ===
Event	Places	Qualified athletes
WT Olympic Rankings (as of December 3, 2023)	6	Cheick Sallah Cissé (CIV); Carlos Sansores (MEX); Ivan Šapina (CRO); Caden Cunningham (GBR); Emre Kutalmış Ateşli (TUR); Nikita Rafalovich (UZB) (Note: Vladislav Larin originally earned a quota place through the Grand Slam Series Rankings, but was rejected by the IOC. His spot was redistributed to the WT Olympic Rankings list.)
WT Grand Slam Series Rankings	0	—
African Qualification Tournament	2	Abdoul Razak Issoufou (NIG); Alasan Ann (GAM)
European Qualification Tournament	2	Richard Ordemann (NOR); Patrik Divkovič (SLO)
Asian Qualification Tournament	2	Song Zhaoxiang (CHN); Arian Salimi (IRI)
Oceania Qualification Tournament	1	Gibson Mara (PNG)
Pan American Qualification Tournament	2	Jonathan Healy (USA); Rafael Alba (CUB)
Host nation / Universality places	1	Paivou Gomis (GBS)
Additional	1	Kasra Mehdipournejad (EOR)
Total	17	

== Women's events ==
Quota places are allocated to the respective NOC and not necessarily to the taekwondo practitioner achieving the place in the qualification event.

=== −49 kg ===
Event	Places	Qualified athletes
WT Olympic Rankings (as of December 3, 2023)	7	Panipak Wongpattanakit (THA); Merve Dinçel (TUR); Adriana Cerezo (ESP); Lena Stojković (CRO); Daniela Souza (MEX); Guo Qing (CHN) (Note: With the Grand Slam winner already qualified through the Olympic Rankings, the spot for the Grand Slam winner was re-allocated to the Olympic Rankings.); Oumaima El-Bouchti (MAR) (Note: Saffron Tambyrajah from Australia originally won the Oceanian qualifier but Oceania Taekwondo Union disabled the Olympic quota spot due to the event did not have the minimum participation of athletes required. The quota space is allocated to the WT Olympic Rankings list.)
WT Grand Slam Series Rankings	0	—
African Qualification Tournament	2	Michelle Tau (LES); Ikram Dhahri (TUN)
European Qualification Tournament	2	Ilenia Matonti (ITA); Avishag Semberg (ISR)
Asian Qualification Tournament	2	Mobina Nematzadeh (IRI); Dunya Abutaleb (KSA)
Oceania Qualification Tournament	0	—
Pan American Qualification Tournament	2	Josipa Kafadar (CAN); María Sara Grippoli (URU)
Host nation / Universality places	1	Ana Belo (TLS)
Additional	1	Dina Pouryounes (EOR)
Total	17	

=== −57 kg ===
Event	Places	Qualified athletes
WT Olympic Rankings (as of December 3, 2023)	6	Luo Zongshi (CHN); Jade Jones (GBR); Skylar Park (CAN); Nahid Kiani (IRI); Hatice Kübra İlgün (TUR); Lo Chia-ling (TPE)
WT Grand Slam Series Rankings	0	—
African Qualification Tournament	2	Emmanuella Atora (GAB); Chaima Toumi (TUN)
European Qualification Tournament	2	Kimia Alizadeh (BUL) (Note: Kimia Alizadeh won the quota as a member of Refugee Olympic Team, but later approached by Bulgarian Taekwondo Federation to compete instead for Bulgaria.); Dominika Hronová (CZE)
Asian Qualification Tournament	2	Laetitia Aoun (LBN); Kim Yu-jin (KOR)
Oceania Qualification Tournament	1	Stacey Hymer (AUS)
Pan American Qualification Tournament	2	Faith Dillon (USA); Maria Clara Pacheco (BRA)
Host nation / Universality places	1	Miljana Reljiḱ (MKD)
Total	16	

=== −67 kg ===
Event	Places	Qualified athletes
WT Olympic Rankings (as of December 3, 2023)	6	Sarah Chaâri (BEL); Julyana Al-Sadeq (JOR); Aleksandra Perišić (SRB); Zhang Mengyu (CHN); Ruth Gbagbi (CIV); Caroline Santos (BRA)
WT Grand Slam Series Rankings	0	—
African Qualification Tournament	2	Aya Shehata (EGY); Elizabeth Anyanacho (NGR)
European Qualification Tournament	2	Cecilia Castro (ESP); Viviana Márton (HUN)
Asian Qualification Tournament	2	Sasikarn Tongchan (THA); Ozoda Sobirjonova (UZB)
Oceania Qualification Tournament	1	Lolohea Navuga Naitasi (FIJ)
Pan American Qualification Tournament	2	Kristina Teachout (USA); Madelyn Rodríguez (DOM)
Host nation / Universality places	1	Magda Wiet-Hénin (FRA)
Total	16	

=== +67 kg ===
Event	Places	Qualified athletes
WT Olympic Rankings (as of December 3, 2023)	5	Nafia Kuş (TUR); Lee Da-bin (KOR); Rebecca McGowan (GBR); Svetlana Osipova (UZB); Lorena Brandl (GER)
WT Grand Slam Series Rankings	1	Xiao Shunan (CHN)
African Qualification Tournament	2	Astan Bathily (CIV); Fatima-Ezzahra Aboufaras (MAR)
European Qualification Tournament	2	Petra Štolbová (CZE); Marlene Jahl (AUT)
Asian Qualification Tournament	2	Munira Abdusalomova (TJK); Rama Abu Al-Rub (JOR)
Oceania Qualification Tournament	1	Venice Traill (FIJ)
Pan American Qualification Tournament	2	Fernanda Aguirre (CHI); Arlettys Acosta (CUB)
Host nation / Universality places	1	Althéa Laurin (FRA)
Total	16	
