= 2024 Oceania Taekwondo Olympic Qualification Tournament =

Taekwondo competition

The 2024 Oceania Qualification Tournament for Paris Olympic Games was held at National Aquatics Centre, Honiara, Solomon Islands on 6 April 2024. Each country could enter a maximum of 2 male and 2 female divisions with only one athlete in each division. The winner of each division qualified for the Olympic Games under their National Olympic Committee.

== Men ==
=== −58 kg ===
Semifinals			Final
Bailey Lewis (AUS)	WD
Aloi Meras (VAN)			Bailey Lewis (AUS)	8^{P}	1^{WD}
Isaac Myrie (SOL)	2	9	Isaac Myrie (SOL)	0	0
Cole Krech-Watene (NZL)	2	7

=== −68 kg ===
Semifinals			Final
Richard Lin (FIJ)	0	20
Eisa Mozhdeh (NZL)	5	22	Eisa Mozhdeh (NZL)	17	8
Oswald Tapelu (SAM)	6	7	Kevin Kassman (PNG)	8	5
Kevin Kassman (PNG)	8	7^{P}

=== −80 kg ===
Quarterfinals			Semifinals			Final
			Leon Sejranovic (AUS)	20	16
James Pita Johnny (VAN)	13	5	Moala Takelo (TGA)	2	2
Moala Takelo (TGA)	11^{P}	8^{P}				Leon Sejranovic (AUS)	17^{R}
						Ryan Eteuati (SAM)	0
			Tionwiriam Temakei (KIR)	0	4
			Ryan Eteuati (SAM)	14	15

=== +80 kg ===
Quarterfinals			Semifinals			Final
			Nakibwae Kanimisu (KIR)	1	3
Nipesh Prakash (FIJ)	7	6	Nipesh Prakash (FIJ)	22	31
Pita Taufatofua (TGA)	3	3				Nipesh Prakash (FIJ)	20	6	14
						Gibson Mara (PNG)	10	14	14
			Charlton Alafa Lao (SOL)	4
			Gibson Mara (PNG)	17	WD

== Women ==
=== −49 kg ===
Final
Saffron Tambyrajah (AUS)	13	27
Grace Bebe (VAN)	0	1

=== −57 kg ===
Semifinals				Final
Stacey Hymer (AUS)	16	12
Erika Jean Maetia (SOL)	0	1		Stacey Hymer (AUS)	13	24
Jamie Carpenter (NZL)	7	5	6	Angel Sitapa (TGA)	2	0
Angel Sitapa (TGA)	4	7	7

=== −67 kg ===
Quarterfinals			Semifinals				Final
			Pauline Lolohea (TGA)	10	0	0
Jemesa Landers (NZL)	13	10	Jemesa Landers (NZL)	5	3	2
Fiona Johe (PNG)	8	0					Jemesa Landers (NZL)	16^{P}	14
							Lolohea Navuga Naitasi (FIJ)	12	5
			Uriamteiti Teakaua (KIR)	4	11
			Lolohea Navuga Naitasi (FIJ)	24	33^{P}

=== +67 kg ===
Semifinals			Final
Lyneth Maniasi (SOL)	9	11
Ketty Ataia (KIR)	0	4	Lyneth Maniasi (SOL)	6	11
Venice Traill (FIJ)	10	7	Venice Traill (FIJ)	17	14
Imelda Soma (PNG)	0	2
