= Faith Dillon =

American taekwondo athlete

Personal information
- Born: June 23, 2002 (age 24) Waterbury, Connecticut, U.S.
- Home town: Las Vegas, Nevada, U.S.
- Education: DeVry University
- Height: 5 ft 9 in (175 cm)
- Weight: 57 kg (126 lb)

Sport
- Country: United States
- Sport: Taekwondo
- Event: –57 kg
Medal record
Women's taekwondo
Representing the United States
Grand Prix
Silver medal – second place	2023 Manchester	57 kg
Bronze medal – third place	2023 Rome	57 kg
Pan American Championships
Bronze medal – third place	2021 Cancún	57 kg
Bronze medal – third place	2022 Punta Cana	62 kg

Faith Dillon (born June 23, 2002) is an American taekwondo athlete. She represented the United States at the 2024 Summer Olympics.

== Early life ==
Dillon was born to Brendan and Doison Dillon in Waterbury, Connecticut, and raised in Las Vegas, Nevada. She began training in taekwondo at five years old, after seeing the television series Jackie Chan Adventures. She attended West Career and Technical Academy in Las Vegas.

== Career ==
Dillon made her senior international debut for the United States in June 2021 at the 2021 Pan American Taekwondo Championships and won a bronze medal in the women's 57 kg event.

In May 2022, she competed at the 2022 Pan American Taekwondo Championships and won a bronze medal in the women's 62 kg event. In November 2022, she competed in the women's lightweight event at the 2022 World Taekwondo Championships held in Guadalajara, Mexico.

In June 2023, she competed in the women's lightweight event at the 2023 World Taekwondo Championships held in Baku, Azerbaijan. Later that month she then competed at the 2023 World Taekwondo Grand Prix in Rome, Italy and won a bronze medal in the women's 57 kg event. In December 2023, she competed at the 2023 World Taekwondo Grand Prix in Manchester, United Kingdom and won a silver medal in the women's 57 kg event, losing to Luo Zongshi.

In January 2024, she competed at the U.S. Olympic Trials and defeated 2022 world champion Makayla Greenwood to advance to the 2024 Pan American Taekwondo Olympic Qualification Tournament. Later that month at the Fujairah Open she fractured the metacarpal bone in her ring finger after an axe kick to her hand. She underwent surgery and missed three to four weeks of action. In April 2024, during the Olympic Qualification Tournament, she won her semifinal match and qualified to represent the United States at the 2024 Summer Olympics.
