= Venice Traill =

Fijian taekwondo practitioner

Venice Elizabeth Megan Traill (born 15 December 1997) is a Fijian taekwondo practitioner. She represented Fiji at the 2024 Summer Olympics, securing her spot by winning the Olympic qualifying tournament in Honiara. Her qualification made her the first taekwondo practitioner from Fiji to qualify for the Olympics. She competed in the women's +67kg taekwondo event, losing to Rebecca McGowan.

== Personal life ==
Traill took up taekwondo at 14 years old after joining her nephew in a self-defense class. While training for the Olympics, she worked in a call centre while also studying at the University of the South Pacific.
