= Yuto Horigome (skateboarder) =

Japanese professional skateboarder (born 1998)

Yuto Horigome 堀米 雄斗
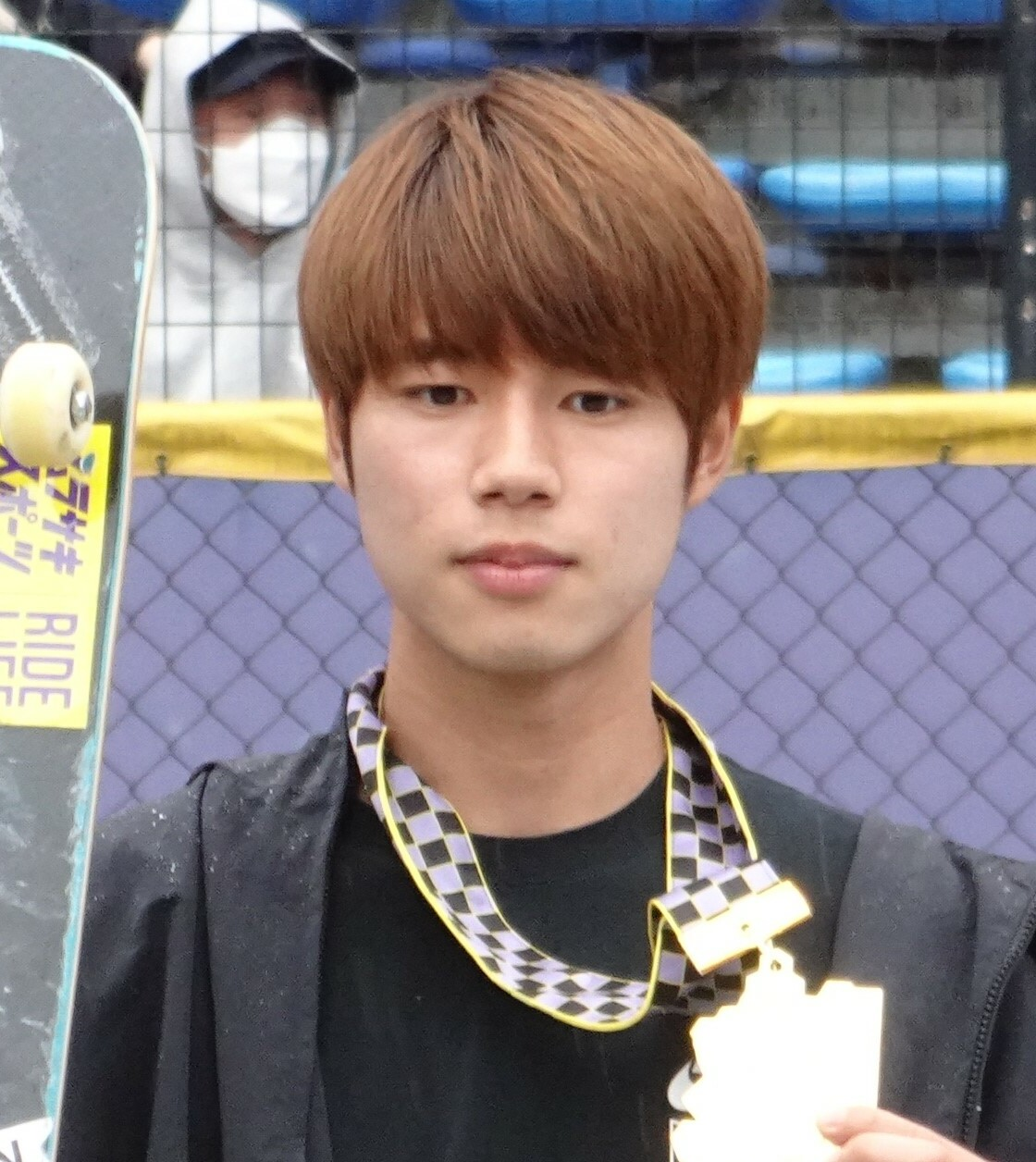
- Horigome at X Games Chiba 2022

Personal information
- Native name: 堀米 雄斗
- Born: 7 January 1999 (age 27) Kōtō, Tokyo, Japan
- Height: 170 cm (5 ft 7 in)
- Weight: 55 kg (121 lb)

Sport
- Country: Japan
- Sport: Skateboarding
- Position: Goofy-footed
- Rank: 3rd – street (August 2024)
- Events: Street, park
- Turned pro: 2019
Medal record
Men's street skateboarding
Representing Japan
Olympic Games
| Gold medal – first place | 2020 Tokyo | Street |
| Gold medal – first place | 2024 Paris | Street |
World Championships
| Gold medal – first place | 2021 Rome | Street |
| Silver medal – second place | 2019 São Paulo | Street |
| Bronze medal – third place | 2023 Tokyo | Street |
X Games
| Gold medal – first place | 2019 Minneapolis | Street |
| Gold medal – first place | 2022 Chiba | Street |
| Gold medal – first place | 2022 California | Street Best Trick |
| Gold medal – first place | 2023 California | Street |
| Gold medal – first place | 2023 California | Street Best Trick |
| Gold medal – first place | 2025 Salt Lake City | Street |
| Silver medal – second place | 2019 Minneapolis | Street Best Trick |
| Bronze medal – third place | 2019 Shanghai | Street |
| Bronze medal – third place | 2022 California | Street |

Yuto Horigome (堀米 雄斗, Horigome Yūto; born 7 January 1999) is a Japanese professional skateboarder and two-time Olympic champion. He won the gold medal in the inaugural Olympic men's street event at the 2020 Summer Olympics, becoming the first person to win gold in men's street skateboarding at the Summer Olympics. He defended his gold medal in the same event at the 2024 Summer Olympics.

== Early life ==
Horigome along with his two younger brothers were born in Tokyo, Japan, to taxi driver and former street skateboarder Ryota Horigome. Ryota Horigome exposed his son Yuto to skateboarding before he could walk. At the age of seven Horigome was already frequenting Tokyo's Murasaki Sport's Park, better known as "Amazing Square" Skate Park. Horigome spent hours here practicing his tricks and honing his skills. By age 12 he knew his dream was to be a professional skater and continued to train relentlessly, encouraged by his heroes Mike Carroll, Gino Iannucci, Eric Koston, Guy Mariano, Shane O'Neill, and Paul Rodriguez.

== Skateboarding career ==
=== Relocation ===
At age 14, Horigome began traveling to the United States for skating trips and eventually moved to Los Angeles, California at age 16, where he currently resides. Due to his travel schedule, he attended high school from a virtual online school. When in the United States, Horigome stays with friends, including pro skateboarder Micky Papa, in Los Angeles, California. Horigome stays in the United States during the winter due to the cold season in Japan to continue practicing his tricks.

=== Early career ===
California's thriving and vibrant skate culture empowered Horigome to continue practicing and entering skate contests. Horigome finished 2nd place in the Wild in the Parks hosted by Volcom and The Berrics. One year later he competed in the Tampa Am Saturday qualifiers finishing in first place. Horigome began to make a name for himself, becoming renowned for his tricks involving rails and large gaps. While in Los Angeles, In 2015, Horigome filmed some skating parts alongside Canadian skateboarder Micky Papa, who was sponsored by Blind Skateboards. Horigome joined the Blind Skateboards team later that year and stayed with the team until January 2019.

Horigome made his professional Street League Skateboarding (SLS) debut in May 2017, at the championship in Barcelona. Horigome came in third place for a bronze medal at the age of 18, as the youngest of the three medalists. One year later Horigome found himself once again on the podium in London, Los Angeles and Huntington Beach, California, this time winning gold in all three competitions and making history as the first Japanese athlete to win first place in an SLS championship. Horigome also found himself coming first place in the Dew Tour, in front of renowned skater Kelvin Hoefler, with his skate film still available online.

In May 2019, Horigome joined April Skateboards, owned by pro skater Shane O'Neill. Later that same year Horigome further proved himself by winning two gold medals and a bronze at the X Games competitions in Shanghai and Minneapolis. April continued to help Horigome in putting himself on the map coming out with a skate tape titled The Yuto Show!, which showcased his skateboarding abilities in a 3 minute long video. Horigome finished 2019 by winning silver against three time reigning champ Nyjah Huston at the São Paulo World Championship.

=== Approaching the Olympics ===
Approaching the 2020 Summer Olympics, Horigome ranked second in men's street on the World Skate (WS) World Skateboarding Olympic Rankings in June 2019, with 62,480 points. At that time, American Nyjah Huston topped the men's street rankings with 67,080 points.

As the 2020 Olympic Games were postponed for a year and the number of skateboarding events in 2020 was significantly reduced due to the COVID-19 pandemic, the WS Olympic Rankings for June 2021 included points earned from events in the 1 January–30 September 2019 season and the 1 October 2019 – 30 June 2021 season. In the 2021 Skate World Championship Horigome managed to take home the gold over Nyjah Huston, but Horigome remained in second place, with 249,200 points, behind Huston's 269,900 points in the Olympic Rankings.

=== Tokyo Olympic Games and beyond ===
At the 2020 Olympic Games Horigome displayed one of the best performances of his career receiving 9.03, 9.30, 9.35 and an astounding 9.50 on his finishing nollie backside 270 totaling to a combined score of 37.18. Winning the first ever gold medal for Olympic Skateboarding in his hometown of Tokyo solidified Horigome as one of the top skateboarders in the world.

After the Olympics, Horigome went on to win gold in X Games Chiba, which was the first X Games held in Japan. Since the X Games Chiba, Horigome has gone on to win gold in two more X Games over rivals Braden Hoban and Nyjah Huston. Horigome continues to break records recently becoming the first Japanese skater to win the Tampa Pro (skateboard competition).

=== Sponsorships ===
As of August 2024, Horigome is sponsored by Seiko, Nike SB, April Skateboards, Hardies Hardware, Venture, Spitfire, Mixi, Murasaki, Rakuten, Lipovitan, Louis Vuitton, Supreme (brand), Delta Air Lines. Horigome is often seen as the face of skateboarding in Japan helping to increase its popularity in his home country with the help of massive Japanese ecommerce and media company Rakuten even creating and competing in Japan's own Uprising Tokyo Street Skateboarding Competition. Japan's own watch company Seiko also came out with a limited edition watch in collaboration with Horigome. Nike has also come out with a Nike Dunk with a colorway customized by Horigome in honor of his home ward in Tokyo.

== Honors ==
Horigome was named "Skater of the Year" at the Japan Action Sports Awards in 2017 and 2018.

== Contest history ==
This list contains top pro tour, 5-star, and world championship events in which Horigome has participated; it is not an exhaustive list.

| Event | Host city | Venue | Date | Entrants | Discipline | Rank |
|---|---|---|---|---|---|---|
| 2024 Summer Olympics | Paris (France) | Place de La Concorde (La Concorde 3) | 29 Jul 2024 | 22 | Street | 1st place, gold medalist(s) |
| WST Tokyo Street (2023 World Championship) | Tokyo (Japan) | Ariake Coliseum | 17 Dec 2023 | 8 | Street | 3rd place, bronze medalist(s) |
| WST Lausanne Street | Lausanne (Switzerland) | Beaulieu Lausanne | 16 Sep 2023 | 8 | Street | 5th |
| Street League Skateboarding | Tokyo (Japan) | Ariake Arena | 12 Aug 2023 | 6 | Street | 1st place, gold medalist(s) |
| X Games | Ventura (US) | Ventura County Fairgrounds | 23 Jul 2022 | 8 | Street | 1st place, gold medalist(s) |
| X Games | Ventura (US) | Ventura County Fairgrounds | 22 Jul 2022 | 8 | Best Trick | 1st place, gold medalist(s) |
| Uprising Tokyo | Tokyo (Japan) | Ariake Arena | 27 May 2023 | 10 | Street | 1st place, gold medalist(s) |
| Tampa Pro | Tampa (US) | Skatepark of Tampa | 5 Mar 2023 | 12 | Street | 1st place, gold medalist(s) |
| Street League Skateboarding | Seattle (US) | Angel of the Winds Arena | 14 Aug 2022 | 8 | Street | 1st place, gold medalist(s) |
| Dew Tour | Des Moines (US) | Lauridsen Skatepark | 29 Jul 2022 | 12 | Street | 2nd place, silver medalist(s) |
| Dew Tour | Des Moines (US) | Lauridsen Skatepark | 29 Jul 2022 | 12 | Best Trick | 1st place, gold medalist(s) |
| X Games | Southern California (US) | Brooklyn Rail | 24 Jul 2022 | 10 | Real Street Best Trick | 1st place, gold medalist(s) |
| X Games | Southern California (US) | CA Training Facility | 23 Jul 2022 | 10 | Street | 3rd place, bronze medalist(s) |
| X Games | Southern California (US) | CA Training Facility | 23 Jul 2022 | 10 | Street Best Trick | 8th |
| Street League Skateboarding | Jacksonville (US) | VyStar Veterans Memorial Arena | 17 Jul 2022 | 8 | Street | 1st place, gold medalist(s) |
| World Street Skateboarding 2022 | Rome (Italy) | Parco del Colle Oppio | 3 Jul 2022 | 8 | Street | 8th |
| Tampa Pro | Tampa (US) | Skatepark of Tampa | 1 May 2022 | 12 | Street | 11th |
| X Games | Chiba (Japan) | ZOZO Marine Stadium | 24 Apr 2022 | 15 | Street | 1st place, gold medalist(s) |
| 2020 Summer Olympics | Tokyo (Japan) | Ariake Urban Sports Park | 25 Jul 2021 | 20 | Street | 1st place, gold medalist(s) |
| 2021 Street World Championship | Rome (Italy) | Foro Italico | 6 Jun 2021 | 32 | Street | 1st place, gold medalist(s) |
| Dew Tour | Des Moines (US) | Lauridsen Skatepark | 23 May 2021 | 32 | Street | 2nd place, silver medalist(s) |
| Oi STU Open | Rio de Janeiro (Brazil) | Skatepark da Praça Duó | 15 Nov 2019 | 31 | Street | 5th |
| SLS Super Crown | Rio de Janeiro (Brazil) | Pavilhão de Exposições Anhembi | 22 Sep 2019 | 8 | Street | 2nd place, silver medalist(s) |
| ISO Henan | Henan (China) | Qingfeng Extreme Sports Base | 7 Sep 2019 | 8 | Street | 1st place, gold medalist(s) |
| X Games Minneapolis 2019 | Minneapolis (US) | U.S. Bank Stadium | 3 Aug 2019 | 10 | Street | 1st place, gold medalist(s) |
| X Games Minneapolis 2019 | Minneapolis (US) | U.S. Bank Stadium | 4 Aug 2019 | 9 | Street Best Trick | 2nd place, silver medalist(s) |
| SLS World Tour 2019 | Los Angeles (US) | Galen Center | 29 Jul 2019 | 75 | Street | 1st place, gold medalist(s) |
| X Games | Shanghai (China) | Shanghai International Resort | 1 Jun 2019 | 10 | Street | 3rd place, bronze medalist(s) |
| SLS World Tour 2019 | London (UK) | Copper Box Arena | 26 May 2019 | 104 | Street | 9th |
| SLS World Championship | Rio de Janeiro (Brazil) | Carioca Arena 1 | 12 Jan 2019 | 8 | Street | 2nd place, silver medalist(s) |
| Street League Skateboarding | Huntington Beach (US) | Vans Off The Wall Skatepark | 16 Dec 2018 | 8 | Street | 1st place, gold medalist(s) |
| World Skateboarding Championship | Nanjing (China) | Longjiang Skatepark | 2 Nov 2018 | 8 | Park | 6th |
| X Games | Sydney (Australia) | Sydney Showground | 21 Oct 2018 | 10 | Street | 5th |
| CPH OPEN | Berlin (Germany) | Berlin Skatehalle | 11 Aug 2018 | 11 | Street | 2nd place, silver medalist(s) |
| X Games Minneapolis 2018 | Minneapolis (US) | U.S. Bank Stadium | 22 Jul 2018 | 8 | Street | 4th |
| Street League Skateboarding | Los Angeles (US) | Galen Center | 7 Jul 2018 | 8 | Street | 1st place, gold medalist(s) |
| Dew Tour | Long Beach (US) | Long Beach Convention Center | 1 Jul 2018 | 8 | Street | 1st place, gold medalist(s) |
| Street League Skateboarding | London (UK) | Copper Box Arena | 27 May 2018 | 8 | Street | 1st place, gold medalist(s) |
| X Games | Oslo (Norway) | Telenor Arena | 20 May 2018 | 8 | Street | 4th |
| Tampa Pro | Tampa (US) | Skatepark of Tampa | 5 Mar 2018 | 12 | Street | 10th |
| X Games Minneapolis 2017 | Minneapolis (US) | U.S. Bank Stadium | 16 Jul 2017 | 10 | Street | 9th |
| Street League Skateboarding | Munich (Germany) | Olympic Park | 26 Jun 2017 | 8 | Street | 2nd place, silver medalist(s) |
| Dew Tour | Long Beach (US) | Long Beach Convention Center | 16 Jun 2017 | 6 | Street | 3rd place, bronze medalist(s) |
| Street League Skateboarding | Barcelona (Spain) | Skate Agora | 20 May 2017 | 8 | Street | 3rd place, bronze medalist(s) |
| Oi STU OPEN | Rio de Janeiro (Brazil) | Skatepark da Praça Duó | 30 Apr 2017 | 3 | Street | 1st place, gold medalist(s) |
| Cowtown's PHXAM | Phoenix (US) | Desert West Skateboard Plaza | 26 Mar 2017 | 12 | Street | 2nd place, silver medalist(s) |
| Simple Session | Tallinn (Estonia) | Saku Suurhall | 5 Feb 2017 | 63 | Street | 2nd place, silver medalist(s) |
| Tampa Am | Tampa (US) | Skatepark of Tampa | 13 Nov 2016 | 12 | Street | 4th |
| FISE World Series | Chengdu (China) | South Park | 30 Oct 2016 | 12 | Street | 2nd place, silver medalist(s) |
| Damn Am Woodward West | Tehachapi (US) | Woodward West Skatepark | 5 Oct 2014 | 12 | Street | 8th |

== Videography ==
- 2017: For Days - Blind
- 2019: April Skateboards Pro Part - Nike SB
- 2021: The Yuto show ! - April Skateboards
- 2021: Spitfire - Thrasher
- 2023: Yuto Horigome in Tokyo - Nike SB
- 2023: Turbo Green - April Skateboards
- 2023: April - Thrasher
