= Roller sports at the 2026 South American Games =

Roller sports competitions at the 2026 South American Games

- Venue: Invencible Rosario (artistic skating); Patinódromo Municipal (speed skating); Skate Park (skateboarding)
- Dates: September 14–19
- Competitors: 109 from 11 nations

Roller sports competitions at the 2026 South American Games in Rosario, Santa Fe, and Rafaela, Argentina, were held between September 14 and 19. Artistic skating events will take place at Invencible Rosario while speed skating will be held at Patinódromo Municipal; both venues are located within Parque de la Independencia in Rosario. Skateboarding will take place at Skate Park, in Eco Parque, Rafaela

A total of 16 events were contested (eight men's and eight women's). The games will give four quotas for the individual events from the 2027 Pan American Games speed skating competitions.

== Medal summary ==
=== Medal table ===
* Host nation (Argentina)

| Rank | Nation | Gold | Silver | Bronze | Total |
|---|---|---|---|---|---|
| 1 | Colombia | 9 | 5 | 3 | 17 |
| 2 | Argentina* | 2 | 5 | 4 | 11 |
| 3 | Paraguay | 2 | 1 | 0 | 3 |
| 4 | Brazil | 1 | 2 | 2 | 5 |
| 5 | Chile | 1 | 1 | 2 | 4 |
| 6 | Peru | 1 | 0 | 0 | 1 |
| 7 | Ecuador | 0 | 1 | 3 | 4 |
| 8 | Venezuela | 0 | 1 | 2 | 3 |
| Totals (8 entries) | | 16 | 16 | 16 | 48 |

=== Medalists ===
==== Artistic skating ====
| Event | Gold | Silver | Bronze |
|---|---|---|---|
| Men's free skating | Juan Segundo Rodríguez; Argentina | Donato Mastroianni; Argentina | Erik Leite; Brazil |
| Men's solo dance | Brayan Carreño; Colombia | Facundo Nieva Biza; Argentina | Jeshua Folleco; Colombia |
| Women's free skating | Josefa Ramos Mondaca; Chile | Micaela Lopetegui; Argentina | Valentina Longo; Argentina |
| Women's solo dance | Erika Alarcón; Paraguay | Gabriella Giraldi; Brazil | Delfina Veljanovich; Argentina |

==== Inline speed skating ====
| Event | Gold | Silver | Bronze |
|---|---|---|---|
| Men's 200 m time trial | Santiago Vásquez; Colombia | Jhon Tascon; Colombia | Ulcuango Jeremy; Ecuador |
| Men's 500 m + distance | Santiago Vásquez; Colombia | Roberto García; Venezuela | José Rojas; Venezuela |
| Men's 1000 m sprint | Jhon Tascon; Colombia | Julio Mirena; Paraguay | Gabriel Reyes; Chile |
| Men's 5,000 m points | Benjamín Gader; Argentina | Ken Kuwada; Argentina | David Sarmiento; Ecuador |
| Men's 10,000 m elimination | Julio Mirena; Paraguay | Ken Kuwada; Argentina | Kevin Lenis; Colombia |
| Women's 200 m time trial | Kollin Castro; Colombia | María Arias; Ecuador | Sara Muñoz; Colombia |
| Women's 500 m + distance | Sara Muñoz; Colombia | Kollin Castro; Colombia | Catalina Lorca; Chile |
| Women's 1000 m sprint | Kollin Castro; Colombia | Catalina Lorca; Chile | Naiara Sagasti; Argentina |
| Women's 5,000 m points | Gabriela Rueda; Colombia | Yicel Giraldo; Colombia | Gabriela Vargas; Ecuador |
| Women's 10,000 m elimination | Yicel Giraldo; Colombia | Gabriela Rueda; Colombia | Angy Quintero; Venezuela |

==== Skateboarding ====
| Event | Gold | Silver | Bronze |
|---|---|---|---|
| Men's street | Ángelo Caro; Peru | Wallace Farias; Brazil | Mauro Iglesias; Argentina |
| Women's street | Eduarda Ribeiro; Brazil | Jazmín Álvarez; Colombia | Gabriela Mazetto; Brazil |

== Participation ==
Eleven nations participated in the roller sports events of the 2026 South American Games.

- Argentina (19)
- Bolivia (7)
- Brazil (11)
- Chile (14)
- Colombia (19)
- Ecuador (7)
- Panama (1)
- Paraguay (10)
- Peru (7)
- Uruguay (6)
- Venezuela (8)

== Results ==
=== Men's free skating ===
| Rank | Athlete | Nation | Total | Short Program | | | | | Long Program | | | |
| Rank | Athlete | Nation | Total | TES | PCS | DED | Total | Rank | TES | PCS | DED | Total |
|---|---|---|---|---|---|---|---|---|---|---|---|---|
| 1st place, gold medalist(s) | Juan Segundo Rodríguez | Argentina | 209.67 | 52.94 | 24.16 | | 77.10 | 1 | 85.16 | 47.41 | | 132.57 |
| 2nd place, silver medalist(s) | Donato Mastroianni | Argentina | 185.78 | 45.51 | 23.92 | | 69.43 | 3 | 66.81 | 50.54 | -1.00 | 116.35 |
| 3rd place, bronze medalist(s) | Erik Leite | Brazil | 173.15 | 45.54 | 24.58 | | 70.12 | 2 | 56.33 | 47.70 | -1.00 | 103.03 |
| 4 | Deivi Camilo Rojas | Colombia | 168.83 | 46.30 | 22.00 | | 68.30 | 4 | 56.69 | 44.84 | -1.00 | 100.53 |
| 5 | Abel Latallada Palomo | Chile | 111.33 | 22.73 | 17.41 | | 40.14 | 5 | 34.15 | 37.04 | | 71.19 |
| 6 | Miguel Tovar | Venezuela | 99.53 | 23.04 | 17.50 | -2.50 | 38.04 | 6 | 31.38 | 33.61 | -3.50 | 61.49 |
| 7 | Mateo Martínez | Uruguay | 82.22 | 13.14 | 16.00 | | 29.14 | 7 | 25.75 | 28.33 | -1.00 | 53.08 |
| 8 | Héctor Agreda Zurita | Bolivia | 41.16 | 4.54 | 12.50 | | 17.04 | 8 | 4.32 | 19.80 | | 24.12 |

=== Men's solo dance ===
| Rank | Athlete | Nation | Total | Style Dance | | | | | Free Dance | | | |
| Rank | Athlete | Nation | Total | TES | PCS | DED | Total | Rank | TES | PCS | DED | Total |
|---|---|---|---|---|---|---|---|---|---|---|---|---|
| 1st place, gold medalist(s) | Brayan Carreño | Colombia | 161.45 | 36.10 | 34.33 | | 70.43 | 1 | 44.87 | 46.15 | | 91.02 |
| 2nd place, silver medalist(s) | Facundo Nieva Biza | Argentina | 147.92 | 36.37 | 31.91 | | 68.28 | 2 | 36.84 | 42.80 | | 79.64 |
| 3rd place, bronze medalist(s) | Jeshua Folleco | Colombia | 143.19 | 34.66 | 29.41 | | 64.07 | 3 | 39.37 | 39.75 | | 79.12 |
| 4 | Ulises Loiseau Büchele | Argentina | 128.49 | 29.20 | 23.76 | | 52.96 | 4 | 39.56 | 35.97 | | 75.53 |
| 5 | Felipe Tozato | Brazil | 118.21 | 26.00 | 21.50 | -1.00 | 46.50 | 5 | 38.66 | 33.05 | | 71.71 |
| 6 | César Caballero | Paraguay | 93.04 | 23.40 | 18.00 | | 41.40 | 6 | 26.07 | 25.57 | | 51.64 |
| 7 | Benjamín Bravo Ponce | Chile | 83.16 | 22.12 | 17.49 | | 39.61 | 7 | 20.47 | 23.08 | | 43.55 |

=== Women's free skating ===
| Rank | Athlete | Nation | Total | Short Program | | | | | Long Program | | | |
| Rank | Athlete | Nation | Total | TES | PCS | DED | Total | Rank | TES | PCS | DED | Total |
|---|---|---|---|---|---|---|---|---|---|---|---|---|
| 1st place, gold medalist(s) | Josefa Ramos | Chile | 165.96 | 44.18 | 18.42 | | 62.60 | 1 | 70.94 | 32.42 | | 103.36 |
| 2nd place, silver medalist(s) | Micaela Lopetegui | Argentina | 147.66 | 38.78 | 23.00 | | 61.78 | 2 | 45.75 | 40.13 | | 85.88 |
| 3rd place, bronze medalist(s) | Valentina Longo | Argentina | 136.38 | 30.41 | 20.58 | | 50.99 | 3 | 46.45 | 38.94 | | 85.39 |
| 4 | Laura Olympio | Brazil | 134.46 | 31.90 | 20.07 | -1.00 | 50.97 | 4 | 47.02 | 37.47 | -1.00 | 83.49 |
| 5 | Paulina Ruiz | Colombia | 129.49 | 23.85 | 18.00 | | 41.85 | 7 | 55.91 | 33.73 | -2.00 | 87.64 |
| 6 | Romina Franca | Uruguay | 118.57 | 26.89 | 18.09 | | 44.98 | 6 | 41.72 | 31.87 | | 73.59 |
| 7 | Zaira González | Uruguay | 97.45 | 18.06 | 18.33 | -1.00 | 35.39 | 10 | 31.13 | 30.93 | | 62.06 |
| 8 | Camila García de Paredes | Panama | 93.45 | 15.94 | 17.33 | | 33.27 | 11 | 30.31 | 29.87 | | 60.18 |
| 9 | Laura Daniela Rodríguez | Colombia | 91.54 | 28.46 | 17.58 | -1.00 | 45.04 | 5 | 20.93 | 29.07 | -3.50 | 46.50 |
| 10 | Kathya Soszko | Paraguay | 88.05 | 21.52 | 16.25 | | 37.77 | 8 | 22.21 | 29.07 | -1.00 | 50.28 |
| 11 | Isabella Latorre | Brazil | 85.65 | 18.24 | 19.17 | | 37.41 | 9 | 17.11 | 32.13 | -1.00 | 48.24 |
| 12 | Nahir Santacruz | Paraguay | 82.08 | 14.91 | 16.50 | | 31.41 | 12 | 23.20 | 27.47 | | 50.67 |
| 13 | Galilea Rojas Rocha | Bolivia | 49.76 | 5.45 | 14.00 | -1.00 | 18.45 | 13 | 9.91 | 22.40 | -1.00 | 31.31 |

=== Women's solo dance ===
| Rank | Athlete | Nation | Total | Style Dance | | | | | Free Dance | | | |
| Rank | Athlete | Nation | Total | TES | PCS | DED | Total | Rank | TES | PCS | DED | Total |
|---|---|---|---|---|---|---|---|---|---|---|---|---|
| 1st place, gold medalist(s) | Erika Alarcón | Paraguay | 145.76 | 35.53 | 28.91 | | 64.44 | 1 | 38.97 | 42.35 | | 81.32 |
| 2nd place, silver medalist(s) | Gabriella Giraldi | Brazil | 142.68 | 33.53 | 28.08 | | 61.61 | 2 | 39.90 | 41.17 | | 81.07 |
| 3rd place, bronze medalist(s) | Delfina Veljanovich | Argentina | 137.08 | 33.23 | 25.17 | | 58.40 | 3 | 39.80 | 38.88 | | 78.68 |
| 4 | María Paulina Pérez | Colombia | 133.18 | 31.73 | 26.66 | | 58.39 | 4 | 36.56 | 38.23 | | 74.79 |
| 5 | Laila Ozuna | Paraguay | 130.89 | 31.54 | 24.33 | | 55.87 | 5 | 37.00 | 38.02 | | 75.02 |
| 6 | Hannah Castillo | Colombia | 122.80 | 29.30 | 21.83 | | 51.13 | 6 | 36.57 | 35.10 | | 71.67 |
| 7 | Camila Belen Tello | Argentina | 120.00 | 28.50 | 21.34 | | 49.84 | 7 | 36.14 | 34.02 | | 70.16 |
| 8 | Isabella Latorre | Brazil | 113.72 | 24.97 | 22.25 | | 47.22 | 8 | 34.43 | 32.07 | | 66.50 |
| 9 | Valentina Soto Fuentes | Chile | 92.72 | 22.40 | 18.50 | | 40.90 | 9 | 25.50 | 26.32 | | 51.82 |
| 10 | Anahí Saavedra Copa | Bolivia | 62.17 | 12.25 | 13.50 | | 25.75 | 10 | 16.70 | 19.72 | | 36.42 |
| 11 | Iratxe Agreda Zurita | Bolivia | 53.37 | 10.85 | 12.24 | | 23.09 | 11 | 14.20 | 16.58 | -0.50 | 30.28 |

=== Men's 200 m time trial ===
| Rank | Name | Nationality | Time |
|---|---|---|---|
| 1st place, gold medalist(s) | Santiago Vásquez | Colombia | 18.285 |
| 2nd place, silver medalist(s) | Jhon Tascon | Colombia | 18.356 |
| 3rd place, bronze medalist(s) | Ulcuango Jeremy | Ecuador | 18.391 |
| 4 | Emanuelle Silva | Chile | 18.419 |
| 5 | Renato Carchi | Ecuador | 18.451 |
| 6 | Gonzalo Villablanca | Chile | 18.620 |
| 7 | Guilherme Abel | Brazil | 18.657 |
| 8 | Roberto García | Venezuela | 18.660 |

=== Men's 500 m + distance ===
| Rank | Athlete | Nation | Qualification | | | Semifinals | | | Final | |
| Rank | Athlete | Nation | Time | Rank | Result | Time | Rank | Result | Time | Rank |
|---|---|---|---|---|---|---|---|---|---|---|
| 1st place, gold medalist(s) | Santiago Vásquez | Colombia | 43.849 | 1 | Q | 44.376 | 3 | Q | 44.743 | 1 |
| 2nd place, silver medalist(s) | Roberto García | Venezuela | 43.993 | 3 | Q | 44.181 | 2 | Q | 44.900 | 2 |
| 3rd place, bronze medalist(s) | José Rojas | Venezuela | 44.910 | 8 | Q | 44.623 | 4 | Q | 44.991 | 3 |
| 4 | Renato Carchi | Ecuador | 43.964 | 2 | Q | 44.180 | 1 | Q | 45.120 | 4 |
| 5 | Guilherme Abel | Brazil | 44.395 | 6 | Q | 44.310 | 5 | | Did not advance | |
| 6 | Ulcuango Jeremy | Ecuador | 44.067 | 5 | Q | 44.922 | 6 | | Did not advance | |
| 7 | Tobías González | Argentina | 44.420 | 7 | Q | 44.420 | 7 | | Did not advance | |
| 8 | Jhon Tascon | Colombia | 44.016 | 4 | Q | REL | 8 | | Did not advance | |
| 9 | Gonzalo Villablanca | Chile | 45.018 | 9 | Did not advance | | | | | |
| 10 | Emanuelle Silva | Chile | 45.149 | 10 | Did not advance | | | | | |
| 11 | Franco Vento | Peru | 45.331 | 11 | Did not advance | | | | | |
| 12 | Bernardo Timoteo | Peru | 46.228 | 12 | Did not advance | | | | | |
| 13 | Eduardo Zárate | Paraguay | 48.041 | 13 | Did not advance | | | | | |
| 14 | Macario Santelices | Bolivia | 48.501 | 14 | Did not advance | | | | | |
| 15 | José Paredes | Bolivia | 50.061 | 15 | Did not advance | | | | | |

=== Men's 1000 m sprint ===
| Rank | Name | Nationality | Time |
|---|---|---|---|
| 1st place, gold medalist(s) | Jhon Tascon | Colombia | 1:27.165 |
| 2nd place, silver medalist(s) | Julio Mirena | Paraguay | 1:28.226 |
| 3rd place, bronze medalist(s) | Gabriel Reyes | Chile | 1:28.353 |
| 4 | Ulcuango Jeremy | Ecuador | 1:28.939 |
| 5 | Tobías González | Argentina | 1:38.673 |
| 6 | Ken Kuwada | Argentina | 1:43.598 |
| 7 | Renato Carchi | Ecuador | 2:05.853 |
| | Juan Mantilla | Colombia | DNF |

=== Men's 5,000 m points ===
| Rank | Name | Nationality | Result | Gap |
|---|---|---|---|---|
| 1st place, gold medalist(s) | Benjamín Gader | Argentina | 15 | |
| 2nd place, silver medalist(s) | Ken Kuwada | Argentina | 14 | –1 |
| 3rd place, bronze medalist(s) | David Sarmiento | Ecuador | 13 | –2 |
| 4 | Julio Mirena | Paraguay | 11 | –4 |
| 5 | Kevin Lenis | Colombia | 8 | –7 |
| 6 | Gabriel Reyes | Chile | 6 | –9 |
| 7 | Lucas Caneleo | Chile | 2 | –13 |
| 8 | Franco Vento | Peru | | |
| 9 | Brando Torres | Venezuela | | |
| 10 | Fernando Daza | Brazil | | |
| 11 | Bernardo Timoteo | Peru | | |
| 12 | Macario Santelices | Bolivia | | |
| 13 | José Paredes | Bolivia | | |
| | Juan Mantilla | Colombia | DNS | |
| | Nicolás García | Ecuador | DNS | |

=== Men's 10,000 m elimination ===
| Rank | Name | Nationality | Time |
|---|---|---|---|
| 1st place, gold medalist(s) | Julio Mirena | Paraguay | 16:15.945 |
| 2nd place, silver medalist(s) | Ken Kuwada | Argentina | 16:16.072 |
| 3rd place, bronze medalist(s) | Kevin Lenis | Colombia | 16:17.199 |
| 4 | David Sarmiento | Ecuador | |
| 5 | Benjamín Gader | Argentina | |
| 6 | Lucas Caneleo | Chile | |
| 7 | Jhon Tascon | Colombia | |
| 8 | Brandon Torres | Venezuela | |
| 9 | Franco Vento | Peru | |
| 10 | Gabriel Reyes | Chile | |
| 11 | Fernando Daza | Brazil | |
| 12 | Guilherme Abel | Brazil | |
| 13 | Bernardo Timoteo | Peru | |
| 14 | Macario Santelices | Bolivia | |
| 15 | José Paredes | Bolivia | |

=== Women's 200 m time trial ===
| Rank | Name | Nationality | Time |
|---|---|---|---|
| 1st place, gold medalist(s) | Kollin Castro | Colombia | 19.234 |
| 2nd place, silver medalist(s) | María Arias | Ecuador | 19.644 |
| 3rd place, bronze medalist(s) | Sara Muñoz | Colombia | 19.764 |
| 4 | Romina Pérez | Chile | 19.810 |
| 5 | Catalina Lorca | Chile | 19.875 |
| 6 | Madeleine Congo | Ecuador | 20.106 |
| 7 | Fernanda Illanes | Argentina | 20.345 |
| 8 | Camila Meza | Venezuela | 20.416 |

=== Women's 500 m + distance ===
| Rank | Athlete | Nation | Qualification | | | Semifinals | | | Final | |
| Rank | Athlete | Nation | Time | Rank | Result | Time | Rank | Result | Time | Rank |
|---|---|---|---|---|---|---|---|---|---|---|
| 1st place, gold medalist(s) | Sara Muñoz | Colombia | 46.800 | 2 | Q | 48.004 | 3 | Q | 46.583 | 1 |
| 2nd place, silver medalist(s) | Kollin Castro | Colombia | 46.545 | 1 | Q | 47.779 | 1 | Q | 46.651 | 2 |
| 3rd place, bronze medalist(s) | Catalina Lorca | Chile | 46.824 | 3 | Q | 47.929 | 2 | Q | 46.698 | 3 |
| 4 | María Arias | Ecuador | 46.910 | 5 | Q | 48.139 | 4 | Q | 46.856 | 4 |
| 5 | Madeleine Congo | Ecuador | 46.921 | 6 | Q | 48.020 | 5 | | Did not advance | |
| 6 | Micaela Siri | Argentina | 47.064 | 7 | Q | 48.205 | 6 | | Did not advance | |
| 7 | Camila Meza | Venezuela | 47.100 | 8 | Q | 48.635 | 7 | | Did not advance | |
| 8 | Romina Pérez | Chile | 46.870 | 4 | Q | DSQ | 8 | | Did not advance | |
| 9 | Wilmary Toro | Venezuela | 47.559 | 9 | | Did not advance | | | | |
| 10 | Fernanda Illanes | Argentina | 47.670 | 10 | | Did not advance | | | | |
| 11 | Greace Rufino | Peru | 50.530 | 11 | | Did not advance | | | | |
| 12 | Valeria Gavilán | Paraguay | 53.473 | 12 | | Did not advance | | | | |

=== Women's 1000 m sprint ===
| Rank | Name | Nationality | Time |
|---|---|---|---|
| 1st place, gold medalist(s) | Kollin Castro | Colombia | 1:32.648 |
| 2nd place, silver medalist(s) | Catalina Lorca | Chile | 1:32.869 |
| 3rd place, bronze medalist(s) | Naiara Sagasti | Argentina | 1:33.504 |
| 4 | Gabriela Vargas | Ecuador | 1:33.512 |
| 5 | Romina Pérez | Chile | 1:33.737 |
| 6 | Gabriela Rueda | Colombia | 1:33.758 |
| 7 | María Arias | Ecuador | 1:34.255 |
| 8 | Micaela Siri | Argentina | 1:35.541 |

=== Women's 5,000 m points ===
| Rank | Name | Nationality | Result | Gap |
|---|---|---|---|---|
| 1st place, gold medalist(s) | Gabriela Rueda | Colombia | 26 | |
| 2nd place, silver medalist(s) | Yicel Giraldo | Colombia | 20 | –6 |
| 3rd place, bronze medalist(s) | Gabriela Vargas | Ecuador | 9 | –17 |
| 4 | Angy Quintero | Venezuela | 5 | –21 |
| 5 | Daniela Bustamante | Venezuela | 4 | –22 |
| 6 | Javiera San Martín | Chile | 2 | –24 |
| 7 | Macarena Vásquez | Chile | 1 | –25 |
| 8 | Lucía Monje | Argentina | 1 | –25 |
| 9 | Naiara Agasti | Argentina | 1 | –25 |
| 10 | Greace Rufino | Peru | | |
| 11 | Aisha Campos | Peru | | |
| 12 | Lizza Galeano | Paraguay | | |

=== Women's 10,000 m elimination ===
| Rank | Name | Nationality | Time |
|---|---|---|---|
| 1st place, gold medalist(s) | Yicel Giraldo | Colombia | 17:41.289 |
| 2nd place, silver medalist(s) | Gabriela Rueda | Colombia | 17:41.383 |
| 3rd place, bronze medalist(s) | Angy Quintero | Venezuela | 17:41.837 |
| 4 | Javiera San Martín | Chile | |
| 5 | Naiara Sagasti | Argentina | |
| 6 | Daniela Bustamante | Venezuela | |
| 7 | Gabriela Vargas | Ecuador | |
| 8 | Macarena Vásquez | Chile | |
| 9 | Lucía Monje | Argentina | |
| 10 | Greace Rufino | Peru | |
| 11 | Lizza Galeano | Paraguay | |
| 12 | Aisha Campos | Peru | |
| 13 | Madeleine Congo | Ecuador | DNS |

=== Men's street ===
| Rank | Skateboarder | Nation | Final | | | | | | | |
| Rank | Skateboarder | Nation | Run | | Trick | | | | | Total |
|---|---|---|---|---|---|---|---|---|---|---|
| 1st place, gold medalist(s) | Ángelo Caro | Peru | 70.31 | 80.23 | ~~79.97~~ | ~~0.00~~ | 88.04 | 91.74 | ~~0.00~~ | 260.01 |
| 2nd place, silver medalist(s) | Wallace Farías | Brazil | 74.00 | 54.58 | 84.93 | ~~0.00~~ | 90.00 | ~~0.00~~ | ~~0.00~~ | 248.93 |
| 3rd place, bronze medalist(s) | Mauro Iglesias | Argentina | 70.00 | 0.00 | ~~0.00~~ | ~~82.29~~ | 91.53 | 87.15 | ~~0.00~~ | 249.68 |
| 4 | Juan Garcés | Colombia | 65.51 | 60.22 | ~~0.00~~ | 72.65 | ~~0.00~~ | 88.13 | ~~0.00~~ | 226.29 |
| 5 | Matheus Mendes | Brazil | 58.81 | 49.07 | ~~0.00~~ | 71.01 | 79.99 | ~~0.00~~ | ~~0.00~~ | 207.81 |
| 6 | Deivid Tuesta | Peru | 68.49 | 69.95 | 80.97 | ~~0.00~~ | 0.00 | ~~0.00~~ | ~~0.00~~ | 150.92 |
| 7 | Matías Floto | Chile | 0.00 | 61.49 | 77.57 | ~~0.00~~ | ~~0.00~~ | ~~0.00~~ | 0.00 | 139.06 |
| 8 | Jhancarlos González | Colombia | 69.96 | 25.47 | ~~0.00~~ | 0.00 | ~~0.00~~ | 0.00 | ~~0.00~~ | 69.96 |
| 9 | Matías Dellolio | Argentina | 60.14 | 34.93 | Did not advance | | | | | |
| 10 | Marco Fernández | Paraguay | 44.71 | 43.90 | Did not advance | | | | | |
| 11 | Máximo Guarino | Uruguay | 60.14 | 27.93 | Did not advance | | | | | |

=== Women's street ===
| Rank | Skateboarder | Nation | Final | | | | | | | |
| Rank | Skateboarder | Nation | Run | | Trick | | | | | Total |
|---|---|---|---|---|---|---|---|---|---|---|
| 1st place, gold medalist(s) | Eduarda Ribeiro | Brazil | 38.24 | 13.74 | ~~29.88~~ | 35.14 | ~~0.00~~ | 33.52 | ~~0.00~~ | 106.90 |
| 2nd place, silver medalist(s) | Jazmín Álvarez | Colombia | 27.91 | 8.65 | ~~25.43~~ | ~~27.01~~ | ~~0.00~~ | 34.40 | 34.39 | 96.70 |
| 3rd place, bronze medalist(s) | Gabriela Mazetto | Brazil | 27.76 | 6.05 | 39.04 | ~~0.00~~ | 28.18 | ~~0.00~~ | ~~0.00~~ | 94.98 |
| 4 | Julieta González | Uruguay | 23.63 | 22.57 | 26.92 | ~~0.00~~ | ~~19.98~~ | 29.10 | ~~0.00~~ | 79.65 |
| 5 | Valentina Petric | Chile | 11.92 | 20.00 | 26.97 | ~~0.00~~ | ~~17.67~~ | ~~0.00~~ | 31.21 | 78.18 |
| 6 | Gabriela Álvarez | Colombia | 14.44 | 23.10 | 24.47 | 15.76 | ~~15.56~~ | ~~0.00~~ | ~~0.00~~ | 63.33 |
| 7 | Morena Domínguez | Argentina | 13.35 | 17.95 | ~~0.00~~ | 17.96 | ~~0.00~~ | ~~0.00~~ | 23.70 | 59.61 |
| 8 | Kiara Oropeza | Peru | 16.20 | 11.26 | ~~0.00~~ | 14.75 | ~~0.00~~ | ~~0.00~~ | 19.15 | 50.10 |
| 9 | Meghan McCubbin | Uruguay | 1.43 | 5.60 | Did not advance | | | | | |
| 10 | Ruth Feldick | Argentina | 5.57 | 1.07 | Did not advance | | | | | |
| 11 | Melissa Mamani | Bolivia | 0.34 | 0.74 | Did not advance | | | | | |
