= Skateboarding at the 2020 Summer Olympics – Men's street =

Olympic skateboarding event

Men's street at the Games of the XXXII Olympiad
- Olympic skateboarding
- Venue: Ariake Urban Sports Park
- Dates: 25 July 2021
- Competitors: 20 from 12 nations
- Winning score: 37.18

Medalists
1st place, gold medalist(s)		Yuto Horigome	Japan
2nd place, silver medalist(s)		Kelvin Hoefler	Brazil
3rd place, bronze medalist(s)		Jagger Eaton	United States

The 2020 Summer Olympics men's street skateboarding competition occurred on 25 July 2021 at Ariake Urban Sports Park in Tokyo, Japan.

It was originally scheduled to be held in 2020, but on 24 March 2020, the Olympics were postponed to 2021 due to the COVID-19 pandemic.

Yuto Horigome of Japan won the gold medal, with Kelvin Hoefler of Brazil and Jagger Eaton of the United States winning the silver and bronze medals.

== Qualification ==
- 3 from the World Championships
- 16 from the World Olympic Rankings
- 1 host nation place

== Competition format ==
All 20 skateboarders did two 45-second runs, and then five single tricks rounds. Only the top 4 scores from the seven rounds for each skateboarder counted toward the final score. The top 8 skateboarders from the semifinals qualified for the finals, where the scores were reset and follow the same two 45 second round and five single trick round format.

== Results ==
=== Semifinals ===
The top 8 skateboarders of 20 advanced to the finals.

Rank	Heat	Skateboarder	Nation	Run		Trick					Total
Rank	Heat	Skateboarder	Nation	1	2	1	2	3	4	5	Total
1	3	Aurélien Giraud	France	9.00	8.85	~~8.63~~	~~0.00~~	8.94	9.09	~~0.00~~	35.88
2	1	Jagger Eaton	United States	8.58	8.52	~~0.00~~	~~7.95~~	8.63	~~0.00~~	9.34	35.07
3	3	Nyjah Huston	United States	~~7.52~~	8.12	~~0.00~~	~~0.00~~	8.66	9.13	8.96	34.87
4	2	Kelvin Hoefler	Brazil	~~7.43~~	8.15	8.81	~~0.00~~	~~0.00~~	9.23	8.50	34.69
5	1	Vincent Milou	France	~~7.15~~	8.25	9.11	8.27	8.74	~~0.00~~	~~0.00~~	34.36
6	2	Yuto Horigome	Japan	8.41	7.58	8.76	9.00	~~5.55~~	~~0.00~~	~~0.00~~	33.75
7	4	Ángelo Caro	Peru	~~1.01~~	6.96	~~0.00~~	8.99	8.60	8.38	~~0.00~~	32.93
8	4	Gustavo Ribeiro	Portugal	~~7.39~~	7.50	8.45	8.19	~~0.00~~	8.52	~~0.00~~	32.66
9	2	Sora Shirai	Japan	7.99	~~6.72~~	7.54	7.42	8.57	~~0.00~~	~~0.00~~	31.52
10	1	Micky Papa	Canada	6.66	5.50	9.01	~~0.00~~	~~0.00~~	~~0.00~~	9.22	30.39
11	2	Jake Ilardi	United States	6.85	6.75	8.02	~~0.00~~	~~0.00~~	7.41	~~0.00~~	29.03
12	4	Giovanni Vianna	Brazil	7.22	7.10	~~0.00~~	7.57	~~0.00~~	6.26	~~0.00~~	28.15
13	4	Axel Cruysberghs	Belgium	6.52	7.00	~~0.00~~	5.15	~~0.00~~	~~0.00~~	6.14	24.81
14	1	Felipe Gustavo	Brazil	8.49	7.24	0.00	~~0.00~~	~~0.00~~	~~0.00~~	9.02	24.75
15	1	Jhancarlos González	Colombia	4.92	5.22	7.43	6.00	~~0.00~~	~~0.00~~	~~0.00~~	23.57
16	2	Shane O'Neill	Australia	4.66	6.23	8.63	0.00	~~0.00~~	~~0.00~~	~~0.00~~	19.52
17	4	Yukito Aoki	Japan	5.32	5.69	7.59	0.00	~~0.00~~	~~0.00~~	~~0.00~~	18.60
18	3	Brandon Valjalo	South Africa	3.18	1.24	~~0.00~~	5.42	6.57	~~0.00~~	~~0.00~~	16.41
19	3	Manny Santiago	Puerto Rico	2.21	3.24	0.00	0.00	~~0.00~~	~~0.00~~	~~0.00~~	5.45
20	3	Matt Berger	Canada	2.01	2.01	0.00	0.00	~~0.00~~	~~0.00~~	~~0.00~~	4.02

=== Final ===
Rank	Skateboarder	Nation	Run		Trick					Total
Rank	Skateboarder	Nation	1	2	1	2	3	4	5	Total
1st place, gold medalist(s)	Yuto Horigome	Japan	~~8.02~~	~~6.77~~	9.03	~~0.00~~	9.35	9.50	9.30	37.18
2nd place, silver medalist(s)	Kelvin Hoefler	Brazil	8.98	8.84	8.99	~~0.00~~	~~0.00~~	~~7.58~~	9.34	36.15
3rd place, bronze medalist(s)	Jagger Eaton	United States	8.20	9.05	~~0.00~~	8.70	9.40	~~0.00~~	~~0.00~~	35.35
4	Vincent Milou	France	7.87	~~5.54~~	9.23	~~0.00~~	8.34	~~0.00~~	8.70	34.14
5	Ángelo Caro	Peru	7.01	~~6.89~~	9.00	~~0.00~~	~~0.00~~	8.65	8.21	32.87
6	Aurélien Giraud	France	4.21	7.20	8.68	~~0.00~~	9.00	~~0.00~~	~~0.00~~	29.09
7	Nyjah Huston	United States	7.90	9.11	9.09	0.00	~~0.00~~	~~0.00~~	~~0.00~~	26.10
8	Gustavo Ribeiro	Portugal	7.23	5.82	0.00	~~0.00~~	~~0.00~~	~~0.00~~	2.00	15.05

== See also ==
- Skateboarding at the 2020 Summer Olympics
- Skateboarding at the 2020 Summer Olympics – Women's street
- Skateboarding at the 2020 Summer Olympics – Men's park
