= Skateboarding at the 2024 Summer Olympics – Men's street =

Men's street at the Games of the XXXIII Olympiad
- Olympic skateboarding
- Venue: Place de la Concorde
- Dates: 29 July 2024
- Competitors: 22 from 11 nations

Medalists
| 1st place, gold medalist(s) | | Yuto Horigome | Japan |
| 2nd place, silver medalist(s) | | Jagger Eaton | United States |
| 3rd place, bronze medalist(s) | | Nyjah Huston | United States |

The 2024 Summer Olympics men's street skateboarding competition took place on 29 July 2024, having been postponed due to rain at Place de la Concorde two days earlier in Paris.

This was the second edition of the event after it was introduced at the 2020 Olympics. All the 2020 medalists, Yuto Horigome (gold), Kelvin Hoefler (silver), and Jagger Eaton (bronze), qualified. Horigome again took gold, Eaton took silver, and Nyjah Huston won bronze. Hoefler placed sixth.

== Competition format ==
All 22 skateboarders do two 45-second runs, and then five single tricks rounds. Only the best run score and the 2 highest-scoring single trick scores from the seven rounds for each skateboarder count toward the final score. The top 8 skateboarders from the semifinals qualify for the finals, where the scores are reset and follow the same two 45 second round and five single trick round format.

== Results ==
=== Semifinals ===
| Rank | Heat | Skateboarder | Nation | Run | | Trick | | | | | Total |
| Rank | Heat | Skateboarder | Nation | 1 | 2 | 1 | 2 | 3 | 4 | 5 | Total |
|---|---|---|---|---|---|---|---|---|---|---|---|
| 1 | 2 | Jagger Eaton | United States | ~~57.88~~ | 88.37 | ~~0.00~~ | ~~0.00~~ | 92.65 | 93.86 | ~~0.00~~ | 274.88 |
| 2 | 4 | Nyjah Huston | United States | ~~17.89~~ | 90.18 | 90.31 | ~~0.00~~ | 92.17 | ~~0.00~~ | ~~0.00~~ | 272.66 |
| 3 | 2 | Sora Shirai | Japan | ~~61.63~~ | 86.71 | 93.57 | ~~0.00~~ | ~~0.00~~ | 90.14 | ~~0.00~~ | 270.42 |
| 4 | 3 | Yuto Horigome | Japan | 89.72 | ~~34.75~~ | 93.08 | ~~TNS~~ | ~~0.00~~ | 87.38 | ~~0.00~~ | 270.18 |
| 5 | 1 | Matías Dell Olio | Argentina | 88.53 | ~~0.76~~ | ~~0.00~~ | 88.32 | ~~0.00~~ | 89.43 | ~~0.00~~ | 266.8 |
| 6 | 1 | Kelvin Hoefler | Brazil | ~~86.48~~ | 90.41 | ~~0.00~~ | ~~73.98~~ | 85.53 | ~~0.00~~ | 89.30 | 265.24 |
| 7 | 4 | Cordano Russell | Canada | ~~69.00~~ | 86.99 | 85.38 | 91.50 | ~~0.00~~ | ~~0.00~~ | ~~0.00~~ | 263.87 |
| 8 | 4 | Richard Tury | Slovakia | 87.84 | ~~53.37~~ | 78.84 | ~~0.00~~ | ~~0.00~~ | ~~0.00~~ | 91.31 | 257.99 |
| 9 | 2 | Vincent Milou | France | ~~62.29~~ | 71.49 | 87.20 | ~~0.00~~ | 94.09 | ~~0.00~~ | ~~0.00~~ | 252.78 |
| 10 | 1 | Mauro Iglesias | Argentina | ~~8.73~~ | 79.50 | ~~0.00~~ | 90.12 | ~~0.00~~ | ~~0.00~~ | 79.47 | 249.09 |
| 11 | 1 | Matt Berger | Canada | ~~44.53~~ | 51.99 | ~~0.00~~ | ~~0.00~~ | ~~0.00~~ | 88.50 | 89.95 | 230.44 |
| 12 | 2 | Brandon Valjalo | South Africa | ~~31.25~~ | 33.50 | ~~0.00~~ | 81.61 | 82.06 | ~~0.00~~ | ~~0.00~~ | 197.17 |
| 13 | 3 | Giovanni Vianna | Brazil | 85.67 | ~~44.03~~ | 0.00 | ~~0.00~~ | 92.85 | ~~TNS~~ | ~~0.00~~ | 178.52 |
| 14 | 4 | Ginwoo Onodera | Japan | ~~49.50~~ | 83.51 | 0.00 | ~~0.00~~ | 93.57 | ~~0.00~~ | ~~0.00~~ | 177.08 |
| 15 | 3 | Felipe Gustavo | Brazil | ~~26.29~~ | 64.67 | 93.22 | 0.00 | ~~0.00~~ | ~~0.00~~ | ~~0.00~~ | 157.89 |
| 16 | 2 | Aurélien Giraud | France | ~~44.26~~ | 55.64 | 0.00 | ~~0.00~~ | ~~0.00~~ | 88.07 | ~~0.00~~ | 143.71 |
| 17 | 3 | Gustavo Ribeiro | Portugal | 48.31 | ~~33.37~~ | 0.00 | 93.83 | ~~0.00~~ | ~~0.00~~ | ~~0.00~~ | 142.14 |
| 18 | 3 | Ryan Decenzo | Canada | ~~18.06~~ | 25.84 | 0.00 | ~~0.00~~ | 90.85 | ~~0.00~~ | ~~0.00~~ | 116.69 |
| 19 | 1 | Shane O'Neill | Australia | ~~13.41~~ | 16.50 | 0.00 | ~~0.00~~ | ~~0.00~~ | 91.00 | ~~0.00~~ | 107.50 |
| 20 | 4 | Joseph Garbaccio | France | ~~39.72~~ | 72.57 | 0.00 | 0.00 | ~~0.00~~ | ~~0.00~~ | ~~0.00~~ | 72.57 |
| 21 | 2 | Chris Joslin | United States | 50.84 | ~~31.50~~ | 0.00 | 0.00 | ~~0.00~~ | ~~0.00~~ | ~~0.00~~ | 50.84 |
| 22 | 1 | Jhancarlos González | Colombia | ~~47.64~~ | 48.09 | 0.00 | 0.00 | ~~0.00~~ | ~~0.00~~ | ~~0.00~~ | 48.09 |

=== Final ===
| Rank | Skateboarder | Nation | Run | | Trick | | | | | Total |
| Rank | Skateboarder | Nation | 1 | 2 | 1 | 2 | 3 | 4 | 5 | Total |
|---|---|---|---|---|---|---|---|---|---|---|
| 1st place, gold medalist(s) | Yuto Horigome | Japan | 89.90 | ~~68.54~~ | 94.16 | ~~0.00~~ | ~~0.00~~ | ~~0.00~~ | 97.08 | 281.14 |
| 2nd place, silver medalist(s) | Jagger Eaton | United States | ~~61.77~~ | 91.92 | ~~92.80~~ | 93.87 | ~~0.00~~ | 95.25 | ~~0.00~~ | 281.04 |
| 3rd place, bronze medalist(s) | Nyjah Huston | United States | ~~87.06~~ | 93.37 | 92.79 | 93.22 | ~~0.00~~ | ~~0.00~~ | ~~0.00~~ | 279.38 |
| 4 | Sora Shirai | Japan | 90.11 | ~~39.34~~ | 93.80 | ~~0.00~~ | ~~0.00~~ | 94.21 | ~~0.00~~ | 278.12 |
| 5 | Richard Tury | Slovakia | ~~87.85~~ | 89.31 | 92.09 | ~~0.00~~ | ~~0.00~~ | 92.58 | ~~0.00~~ | 273.98 |
| 6 | Kelvin Hoefler | Brazil | 87.25 | ~~38.74~~ | 90.14 | ~~0.00~~ | 92.88 | ~~0.00~~ | ~~0.00~~ | 270.27 |
| 7 | Cordano Russell | Canada | ~~19.06~~ | 23.55 | ~~0.00~~ | ~~92.88~~ | 93.32 | 94.93 | ~~0.00~~ | 211.80 |
| 8 | Matías Dell Olio | Argentina | ~~69.14~~ | 69.86 | 0.00 | ~~0.00~~ | ~~0.00~~ | ~~0.00~~ | 84.12 | 153.98 |
