= Roller sports at the 2022 South American Games =

Roller sports competitions at the 2022 South American Games

- Centro Acuático Nacional; SND Arena; Centro Nacional de Patinaje Velocidad
- Venue: Parque Olímpico Asunción
- Dates: October 1−2 (skateboarding); October 2−3 (artistic roller skating); October 2−4 (Inline speed skating )
- Nations: 10

Roller sports competitions at the 2022 South American Games in Asunción, Paraguay were held between October 1 and 4, 2022 at the Skatepark in the Parque Olímpico Asunción, SND Arena and Centro Nacional de Patinaje Velocidad

== Schedule ==
P	Preliminary	SP	Short programm	F	Final

Skateboarding
Event↓/Date →	Sat 1	Sun 2
Men's street	P	F
Women's street	P	F

Artistic roller skating
Event↓/Date →	Sun 2	Mon 3
Men's free skating	SP	F
Men's solo dance	SP	F
Women's free skating	SP	F
Women's solo dance	SP	F

Inline speed skating
Event↓/Date →	Sun 2	Mon 3	Tue 4
Men's 200 m time-trial	F		
Men's 500 m		F	
Men's 1000 m	F		
Men's 10,000 m			F
Men's 10,000 m elimination		F	
Women's 200 m time-trial	F		
Women's 500 m		F	
Women's 1000 m	F		
Women's 10,000 m			F
Women's 10,000 m elimination		F	

== Medal summary ==
=== Medal table ===
* Host nation (Paraguay)

Rank	Nation	Gold	Silver	Bronze	Total
1	Colombia	10	6	5	21
2	Brazil	1	4	2	7
3	Chile	1	3	2	6
4	Argentina	1	2	4	7
5	Ecuador	1	1	2	4
6	Paraguay*	1	0	0	1
6	Peru	1	0	0	1
8	Venezuela	0	0	1	1
Totals (8 entries)		16	16	16	48

=== Medalists ===
==== Artistic roller skating ====
Event	Gold	Silver	Bronze
Men's free skating	Tomas Román Masía; Argentina	Erik Leite; Brazil	Franco Mastroianni; Argentina
Men's solo dance	Brayan Carreño; Colombia	Erik Leite; Brazil	Juan Francisco; Argentina
Women's free skating	Paulina Ruiz; Colombia	Martina Della Chiessa; Argentina	Luiza Felipe; Brazil
Women's solo dance	Erika Alarcón; Paraguay	Bianca Ameixeiro; Brazil	Daniela Gerena; Colombia

==== Inline speed skating ====
Event	Gold	Silver	Bronze
Men's 200 m	Emanuelle Silva; Chile	Steven Villegas; Colombia	Jhon Tascon; Colombia
Men's 500 m	Steven Villegas; Colombia	Ricardo Verdugo; Chile	Emanuelle Silva; Chile
Men's 1000 m	Andrés Jiménez; Colombia	Hugo Ramírez; Chile	Ken Kuwada; Argentina
Men's 10,000 m	Mateo Rico; Colombia	Jorge Bolaños; Ecuador	Raúl Pedraza; Chile
Men's 10,000 m elimination	Juan Mantilla; Colombia	Andrés Gómez; Colombia	Jorge Bolaños; Ecuador
Women's 200 m	Sheila Muñoz; Colombia	María José Moya; Chile	María Arias; Ecuador
Women's 500 m	María Fernanda Timms; Colombia	Kollin Castro; Colombia	Nelly Fernández; Venezuela
Women's 1000 m	Gabriela Vargas; Ecuador	Gabriela Rueda; Colombia	María Fernanda Timms; Colombia
Women's 10,000 m	Gabriela Rueda; Colombia	Luz Garzón; Colombia	Rocío Berbel Alt; Argentina
Women's 10,000 m elimination	Fabriana Arias; Colombia	Rocio Berbel Alt; Argentina	Gabriela Rueda; Colombia

==== Skateboarding ====
Event	Gold	Silver	Bronze
Men's street	Deivid Tuesta; Peru	Jhancarlos González; Colombia	João Lucas Alves Miranda; Brazil
Women's street	Gabriela Mazetto; Brazil	Carla Karolina dos Santos; Brazil	Jazmín Álvarez; Colombia

== Participation ==
Ten nations participated in the roller sports events of the 2022 South American Games.

- Argentina
- Bolivia
- Brazil
- Chile
- Colombia
- Ecuador
- Paraguay
- Peru
- Uruguay
- Venezuela

== Results ==
=== Men's street ===
Rank	Skateboarder	Nation	Semifinals								Final							
Rank	Skateboarder	Nation	Run		Trick					Total	Run		Trick					Total
1st place, gold medalist(s)	Deivid Tuesta	Peru	65	68	74.00	~~0.00~~	72.33	~~0.00~~	~~0.00~~	278.99	68	70	~~83.33~~	83.66	~~80.66~~	~~0.00~~	87.66	355.31
2nd place, silver medalist(s)	Jhancarlos González	Colombia	69	62	73.00	~~70.66~~	76.00	~~0.00~~	~~0.00~~	288.99	73	73	~~81.00~~	~~78.66~~	83.33	81.66	~~0.00~~	324.65
3rd place, bronze medalist(s)	João Rodrigues	Brazil	70	68	~~51.00~~	73.33	~~66.66~~	79.66	~~0.00~~	290.98	72	73	81.66	~~0.00~~	~~0.00~~	83.00	~~0.00~~	309.99
4	Santiago Henao	Colombia	50	67	~~65.00~~	~~0.00~~	71.66	~~0.00~~	76.00	279.99	70	60	~~75.00~~	~~0.00~~	79.33	~~0.00~~	76.33	300.66
5	Ángelo Caro	Peru	77	78	~~68.66~~	75.33	~~0.00~~	70.66	~~0.00~~	301.32	40	62	81.33	~~60.00~~	85.33	~~64.00~~	~~0.00~~	292.66
6	Juan Pablo Mateos	Argentina	56	~~0~~	62.66	~~60.00~~	51.66	~~68.00~~	~~0.00~~	259.32	65	72	~~0.00~~	~~68.33~~	~~0.00~~	75.00	69.00	284.33
7	Gabryel Cursino	Brazil	73	70	72.00	~~64.00~~	~~59.66~~	~~59.00~~	70.33	284.99	46	61	~~0.00~~	80.00	80.66	~~0.00~~	~~0.00~~	267.99
8	Marco Fernández	Paraguay	55	68	57.00	~~54.33~~	~~0.00~~	69.66	~~0.00~~	250.32	52	52	~~34.66~~	~~0.00~~	43.66	68.00	~~0.00~~	215.99
9	Diego Suanes	Uruguay	60	59	~~42.00~~	~~0.00~~	60.33	69.33	~~0.00~~	247.98	Did not advance							
10	Rafael Catamo	Venezuela	44	34	~~0.00~~	52.00	50.00	~~25.00~~	~~0.00~~	179.99	Did not advance							
11	Carlos Ramírez	Paraguay	29	21	58.33	~~0.00~~	47.66	~~30.00~~	~~0.00~~	164.65	Did not advance							
12	Juan José Gutierrez	Bolivia	46	41	~~31.00~~	~~30.66~~	35.66	~~34.66~~	38.00	160.32	Did not advance							
13	Kevin Herrera	Chile	60	46	~~0.00~~	51.00	~~0.00~~	~~0.00~~	~~0.00~~	156.99	Did not advance							
	Mauro Iglesias	Argentina	~~0~~	69	~~0.00~~	~~0.00~~	~~0.00~~	~~0.00~~	~~0.00~~	DNS	Did not advance							

=== Women's street ===
Rank	Skateboarder	Nation	Semifinals								Final						
Rank	Skateboarder	Nation	Run		Trick					Total	Run		Trick				Total
1st place, gold medalist(s)	Gabriela Mazetto	Brazil	38.00	43.33	30.00	~~29.66~~	~~29.66~~	30.00	~~0.00~~	141.33	48.00	47.66	~~33.33~~	~~8.00~~	38.33	37.00	170.99
2nd place, silver medalist(s)	Carla Silva	Brazil	28.66	34.33	~~22.00~~	~~0.00~~	24.66	~~0.00~~	32.33	119.98	41.66	42.00	~~24.33~~	32.00	44.33	~~0.00~~	159.99
3rd place, bronze medalist(s)	Jazmín Álvarez	Colombia	20.66	22.00	26.66	18.33	~~0.00~~	~~0.00~~	~~0.00~~	87.65	27.33	38.33	~~0.00~~	30.66	~~27.33~~	33.33	129.65
4	Valentina Petric	Chile	25.00	22.66	23.00	26.000	~~19.00~~	~~0.00~~	~~0.00~~	96.66	29.66	32.33	~~0.00~~	27.00	31.33	~~0.00~~	120.32
5	Julieta González	Uruguay	25.66	26.33	~~0.00~~	17.00	27.00	~~0.00~~	~~0.00~~	95.99	37.00	36.00	~~0.00~~	27.33	19.00	~~0.00~~	119.33
6	Maira Alfonso	Argentina	19.00	18.00	~~0.00~~	16.66	~~0.00~~	9.66	~~0.00~~	63.32	28.33	18.00	17.00	~~17.00~~	28.00	~~15.33~~	91.33
7	Manuela Colorado	Colombia	8.66	11.00	~~0.00~~	20.00	16.66	~~11.66~~	~~0.00~~	59.32	14.33	24.33	14.66	16.00	~~0.00~~	~~0.00~~	69.32
8	Luz Ramírez	Paraguay	16.00	14.66	16.00	18.33	~~0.00~~	~~0.00~~	~~0.00~~	64.99	19.33	16.00	~~0.00~~	~~0.00~~	~~0.00~~	16.66	51.99
9	María Alejandra Arias	Venezuela	18.00	17.66	~~7.33~~	~~0.00~~	11.00	11.66	~~0.00~~	58.32	Did not advance						
10	Ailin Arzúa	Argentina	9.33	15.33	11.33	19.00	~~0.00~~	~~0.00~~	~~0.00~~	54.99	Did not advance						
11	Joselin Mamani	Bolivia	5.00	4.33	~~3.00~~	~~0.00~~	~~0.00~~	26.33	~~0.00~~	38.66	Did not advance						
12	Lourdes Rolon	Paraguay	4.66	6.66	~~0.00~~	3.00	~~0.00~~	~~0.00~~	~~0.00~~	14.32	Did not advance						

=== Men's free routine ===
Rank	Athlete	Nation	Short Program					Long Program			
Rank	Athlete	Nation	TES	PCS	DED	Total	Rank	TES	PCS	DED	Total
1st place, gold medalist(s)	Tomás Román	Argentina	43.05	19.25		62.30	3	85.75	34.43		120.18
2nd place, silver medalist(s)	Erik Leite	Brazil	44.83	20.74		65.57	1	73.85	38.48	1.00	111.13
3rd place, bronze medalist(s)	Franco Mastroianni	Argentina	35.44	19.38	2.00	52.82	6	78.60	35.78	1.00	113.38
4	Juan Sebastián Lemus	Colombia	39.83	18.37	1.00	57.20	4	73.71	32.40	2.00	104.11
5	Deivi Rojas	Colombia	44.78	18.00		62.78	2	64.06	33.07	1.00	96.13
6	Thiago Tortato	Brazil	40.55	17.25	1.00	56.80	5	57.13	30.17	5.50	81.80
7	Victor López	Paraguay	22.67	16.87	1.00	38.54	7	50.45	26.10	5.50	71.05
8	Abel Latallada	Chile	20.75	15.00	1.00	34.75	8	42.76	23.40	2.00	64.16
9	Paulo Andia	Bolivia	2.79	6.99		9.78	9	6.49	10.35		16.84

=== Women's free routine ===
Rank	Athlete	Nation	Short Program					Long Program			
Rank	Athlete	Nation	TES	PCS	DED	Total	Rank	TES	PCS	DED	Total
1st place, gold medalist(s)	Paulina Ruiz	Colombia	39.80	19.00		58.80	1	57.35	30.19	1.00	86.54
2nd place, silver medalist(s)	Martina Della	Argentina	35.93	19.00		54.93	3	53.01	30.19	1.00	82.20
3rd place, bronze medalist(s)	Luiza Felipe	Brazil	30.58	18.00	1 .00	47.58	5	47.59	30.21		77.80
4	Milagros Di Leone	Argentina	34.85	20.26		55.11	2	37.54	29.20	3.50	63.24
4	Bianca Ameixeiro	Brazil	30.22	21.48		51.70	4	39.15	30.80	3.50	66.45
5	Sandra García	Colombia	17.30	13.87	2.00	28.17	8	50.62	29.81		80.43
6	María Eduarda Fuentes	Ecuador	20.25	18.62		38.87	6	37.04	29.98	1.00	66.02
7	Laila Ozuna	Paraguay	18.93	17.51		36.44	7	30.16	27.60		57.76
8	Romina Franca	Uruguay	15.59	12.62	2.00	26.21	9	34.51	22.40	1.00	55.91
9	Florencia Irrazabal	Paraguay	11.19	15.74	1.00	25.93	11	27.21	22.80		50.01
10	Lucía Feldman	Uruguay	12.13	14.00		26.13	10	21.57	23.39	1.00	43.96
11	Almendra Herrera	Chile	10.04	13.63		23.67	12	25.10	20.40	2.00	43.50
12	Anahi Saavedra	Bolivia	7.26	8.25	1.00	14.51	13	12.74	12.00	3.50	21.24

=== Men's solo dance ===
Rank	Athlete	Nation	Short Program					Long Program			
Rank	Athlete	Nation	TES	PCS	DED	Total	Rank	TES	PCS	DED	Total
1st place, gold medalist(s)	Brayan Carreño	Colombia	35.00	27.51		62.51	1	38.90	37.69		76.59
2nd place, silver medalist(s)	Erik Leite	Brazil	31.25	22.49		52.74	2	32.20	31.36		63.56
3rd place, bronze medalist(s)	Juan Francisco Sánchez	Argentina	20.85	23.50		44.35	4	33.45	31.06		64.51
4	Jeshua Folleco	Colombia	27.30	17.25		44.55	3	28.70	29.90		58.60
5	Leonardo Azambuja	Brazil	23.65	15.38		39.03	5	28.65	21.11		49.76
6	Facundo Nieva	Argentina	15.95	16.74		32.69	6	26.40	21.93		48.33
7	Abel Latallada	Chile	15.35	13.50		28.85	7	20.40	17.06	1.00	36.46
8	Roberto Otazu	Paraguay	7.95	12.48		20.43	8	13.80	15.92		29.72

=== Women's solo dance ===
Rank	Athlete	Nation	Short Program					Long Program			
Rank	Athlete	Nation	TES	PCS	DED	Total	Rank	TES	PCS	DED	Total
1st place, gold medalist(s)	Erika Alarcón	Paraguay	28.80	24.12		52.92	1	32.30	35.74		68.04
2nd place, silver medalist(s)	Bianca Ameixeiro	Brazil	29.55	21.88		51.43	2	36.20	32.34		68.54
3rd place, bronze medalist(s)	Daniela Gerena	Colombia	26.50	16.25		42.75	4	32.35	26.48		58.83
4	María Paulina Pérez	Colombia	23.45	20.75		44.20	3	26.10	27.47		53.57
5	Lara Bottini	Argentina	21.30	20.74		42.04	5	27.50	27.94		55.44
6	Stela Rocha	Brazil	21.30	17.13		38.43	7	31.15	22.10		53.25
7	María Agustina Madueño	Argentina	23.15	16.00		39.15	6	26.00	22.93		48.93
8	María Sophia Veiluva	Paraguay	18.70	18.49		37.19	8	26.35	22.26		48.61
9	Sofía Riess	Chile	17.45	15.87	1.00	32.32	9	19.95	20.64		40.59
10	Katherine Bueno	Uruguay	15.60	14.12		29.72	10	22.70	18.52		41.22

=== Men's 200 metres time-trial ===
Rank	Name	Nationality	Time
1st place, gold medalist(s)	Emanuelle Silva	Chile	17.717
2nd place, silver medalist(s)	Steven Villegas	Colombia	17.868
3rd place, bronze medalist(s)	Jhon Tascon	Colombia	17.914
4	Ricardo Verdugo	Chile	17.921
5	Renato Carchi	Ecuador	18.194
6	Francisco Reyes	Argentina	18.323
7	Guilherme Rocha	Brazil	18.373
8	José Moncada	Paraguay	18.443
9	Keiver Pérez	Venezuela	18.554
10	Nahuel Schelling	Argentina	18.558
11	José Carlos Rojas	Venezuela	18.561
12	Gabriel Silva	Brazil	18.692
13	Bernardo Timoteo	Peru	18.785
14	Macario Santelices	Bolivia	20.849
15	Alberto Rivera	Bolivia	DQ-TF

=== Men's 500 metres + distance ===
Heats

Rank	Name	Nation	Time
1	Andrés Jiménez	Colombia	45.231
2	Ricardo Verdugo	Chile	45.308
3	Renato Carchi	Ecuador	45.527

Rank	Name	Nation	Time
1	Steven Villegas	Colombia	46.473
2	Emanuelle Silva	Chile	46.663
3	Bernardo Timoteo	Peru	46.728
4	Alberto Rivera	Bolivia	48.757

Rank	Name	Nation	Time
1	José Carlos Rojas	Venezuela	45.344
2	Nahuel Schelling	Argentina	45.461
3	Macario Santelices	Bolivia	45.468
4	José Moncada	Paraguay	49.269

Rank	Name	Nation	Time
1	Guilherme Rocha	Brazil	44.730
2	Keiver Pérez	Venezuela	45.024
3	Francisco Reyes	Argentina	46.019
4	Gabriel Silva	Brazil	47.610

Semifinals

Rank	Name	Nation	Time
1	Steven Villegas	Colombia	45.344
2	Emanuelle Silva	Chile	45.456
3	Nahuel Schelling	Argentina	46.054
4	José Carlos Rojas	Venezuela	DQ

Rank	Name	Nation	Time
1	Andrés Jiménez	Colombia	44.772
2	Ricardo Verdugo	Chile	44.935
3	Keiver Pérez	Venezuela	45.048
4	Guilherme Rocha	Brazil	45.809

Finals

Rank	Name	Nation	Time
1st place, gold medalist(s)	Steven Villegas	Colombia	44.738
2nd place, silver medalist(s)	Ricardo Verdugo	Chile	44.844
3rd place, bronze medalist(s)	Emanuelle Silva	Chile	45.068
4	Andrés Jiménez	Colombia	45.11

=== Men's 1.000 sprint ===
Heats

Rank	Name	Nation	Time	Notes
1	Andrés Jiménez	Colombia	1:24.84	Q
2	Hugo Ramírez	Chile	1:25.03	Q
3	Nahuel Schelling	Argentina	1:25.10	Q
4	Steven Villegas	Colombia	1:25.29	Q
5	Ken Kuwada	Argentina	1:25.33	Q
6	Ricardo Verdugo	Chile	1:25.70	
7	José Carlos Rojas	Venezuela	1:26.35	Q
8	Renato Carchi	Ecuador	1:26.60	
9	Renato Campana	Ecuador	1:27.71	
10	Gabriel Silva	Brazil	1:28.01	
11	Bernardo Timoteo	Peru	1:28.40	
12	José Moncada	Paraguay	1:29.13	
13	Guilherme Rocha	Brazil	1:31.54	
14	Alberto Rivera	Bolivia	1:37.35	
15	Macario Santelices	Bolivia	1:37.72	
	Gustavo Rodríguez	Venezuela	DQF	

Final

Rank	Name	Nation	Time
1st place, gold medalist(s)	Andrés Jiménez	Colombia	1:24.95
2nd place, silver medalist(s)	Hugo Ramírez	Chile	1:25.11
3rd place, bronze medalist(s)	Ken Kuwada	Argentina	1:25.37
4	José Carlos Rojas	Venezuela	1:26.11
5	Steven Villegas	Colombia	1:28.39
6	Nahuel Schelling	Argentina	1:31.26

=== Men's 10.000 points ===
Rank	Name	Nation	Points
1st place, gold medalist(s)	Mateo Rico	Colombia	26
2nd place, silver medalist(s)	Jorge Bolaños	Ecuador	22
3rd place, bronze medalist(s)	Raúl Pedraza	Chile	5
4	Hugo Ramírez	Chile	3
5	Renato Campana	Ecuador	2
6	Andrés Gómez	Colombia	2
7	Santiago Roumec	Argentina	2
8	Ken Kuwada	Argentina	2
9	Gustavo Rodríguez	Venezuela	
10	José Moncada	Paraguay	
11	Gabriel Silva	Brazil	
12	Yohann Corona	Venezuela	
13	Macario Santelices	Bolivia	
14	Alberto Rivera	Bolivia	

=== Men's 10.000 + elimination ===
Rank	Name	Nation	Points
1st place, gold medalist(s)	Juan Mantilla	Colombia	27
2nd place, silver medalist(s)	Andrés Gómez	Colombia	18
3rd place, bronze medalist(s)	Jorge Bolaños	Ecuador	10
4	Raúl Pedraza	Chile	
5	Ken Kuwada	Argentina	
6	Renato Campana	Ecuador	
7	Santiago Roumec	Argentina	
8	Hugo Ramírez	Chile	
9	Yohann Corona	Venezuela	
10	Gustavo Rodríguez	Venezuela	
11	José Moncada	Paraguay	
12	Gabriel Silva	Brazil	
13	Macario Santelices	Bolivia	
14	Alberto Rivera	Bolivia	
15	Bernardo Timoteo	Peru	

=== Women's 200 metres time-trial ===
Heats

Rank	Name	Nation	Time	Notes
1	Sheila Muñoz	Colombia	19.145	Gold medal race
2	Nelly Fernández	Venezuela	19.436	Gold medal race
3	María Fernanda Timms	Colombia	19.438	Silver medal race
4	María José Moya	Chile	10.439	Silver medal race
5	María Loreto Arias	Ecuador	19.515	Bronze medal race
6	Aylen Tuya	Argentina	19.648	Bronze medal race
7	Javiera Vargas	Chile	19.767	
8	Wilmary Toro	Venezuela	19.989	
9	Micaela Siri	Argentina	20.790	
10	Fernanda Alexandre	Brazil	21.004	
11	Ariadna Modernell	Uruguay	21.865	
12	Denisse Villarroel	Bolivia	22.293	

Finals

Rank	Name	Nation	Time
1st place, gold medalist(s)	Sheila Muñoz	Colombia	19.10
	Nelly Fernández	Venezuela	19.513
2nd place, silver medalist(s)	María José Moya	Chile	19.303
	María Fernanda Timms	Colombia	19.444
3rd place, bronze medalist(s)	María Loreto Arias	Ecuador	19.311
	Aylen Tuya	Argentina	19.852

=== Women's 500 metres + distance ===
Heats

Rank	Name	Nation	Time
1	Kollin Castro	Colombia	47.030
2	María Loreto Arias	Ecuador	47.100
3	María José Moya	Chile	47.560

Rank	Name	Nation	Time
1	María Fernanda Timms	Colombia	48.033
2	Javiera Vargas	Chile	48.181
3	Denisse Villarroel	Bolivia	52.530

Rank	Name	Nation	Time
1	Nelly Fernández	Venezuela	48.073
2	Micaela Siri	Argentina	48.793
3	Fernanda Alexandre	Brazil	49.547

Rank	Name	Nation	Time
1	Wilmary Toro	Venezuela	48.660
2	Aylen Tuya	Argentina	48.880
3	Ariadna Modernell	Uruguay	52.000
4	Andrea Maciel	Paraguay	1:05.300

Semifinals

Rank	Name	Nation	Time
1	Kollin Castro	Colombia	47.945
2	María Loreto Arias	Ecuador	48.063
3	Aylen Tuya	Argentina	48.141
4	Wilmary Toro	Venezuela	48.405

Rank	Name	Nation	Time
1	María Fernanda Timms	Colombia	47.712
2	Nelly Fernández	Venezuela	48.127
3	Javiera Vargas	Chile	48.128
4	Micaela Siri	Argentina	48.659

Finals

Rank	Name	Nation	Time
1st place, gold medalist(s)	María Fernanda Timms	Colombia	46.691
2nd place, silver medalist(s)	Kollin Castro	Colombia	46.946
3rd place, bronze medalist(s)	Nelly Fernández	Venezuela	47.003
4	María Loreto Arias	Ecuador	47.363
