= Jagger Eaton =

American skateboarder (born 2001)

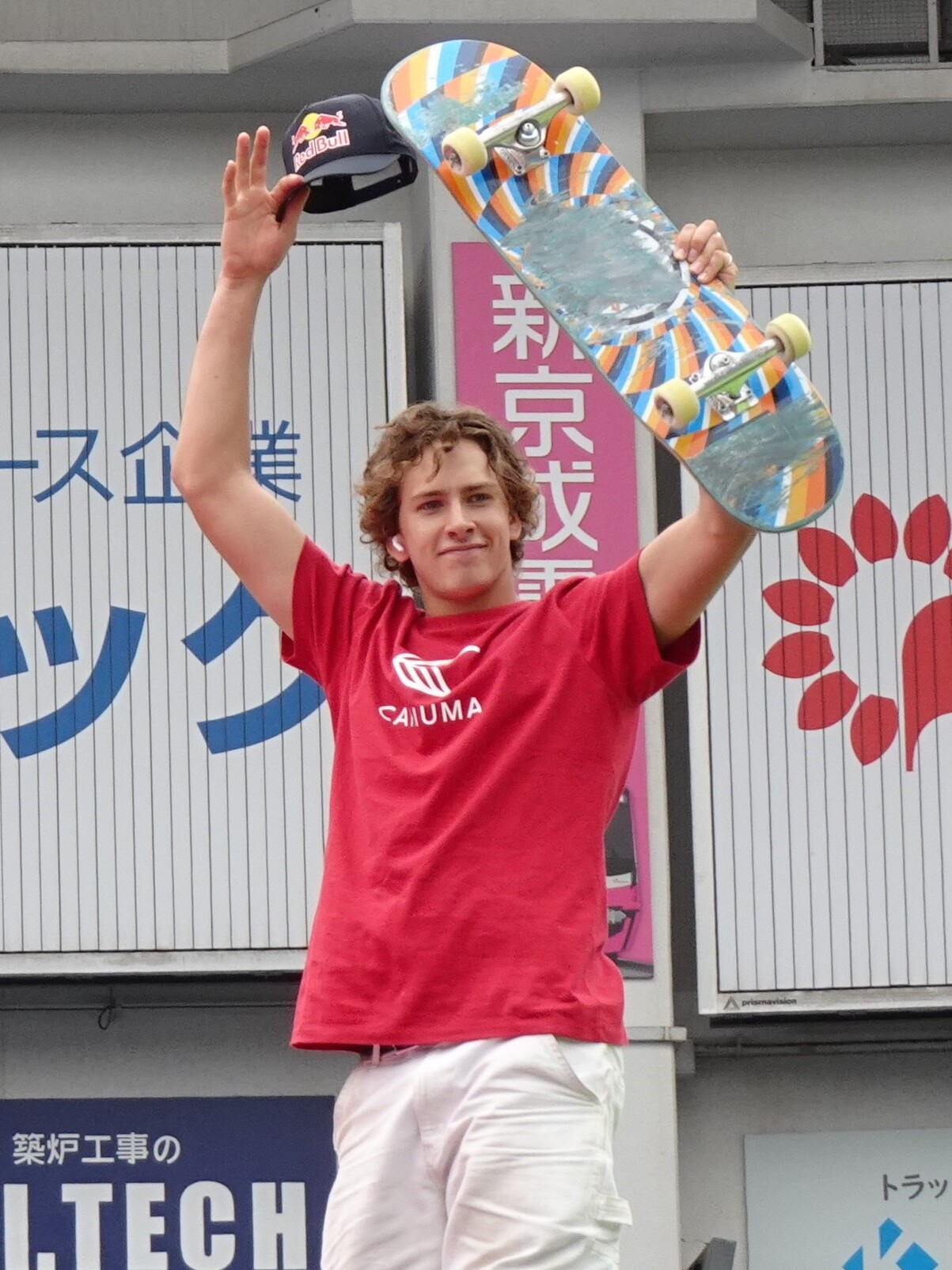
- Eaton in X Games Chiba 2022

Personal information
- Full name: Jagger Geoffrey Eaton
- Born: February 21, 2001 (age 25) Scottsdale, Arizona, U.S.
- Height: 5 ft 9 in (175 cm)

Sport
- Country: United States
- Sport: Skateboarding
Medal record
Men's skateboarding
Representing the United States
Olympic Games
Silver medal – second place	2024 Paris	Street
Bronze medal – third place	2020 Tokyo	Street
World Championships
Gold medal – first place	2021 Jacksonville	Street
Gold medal – first place	2023 Sharjah	Park
Summer X Games
Gold medal – first place	2023 California	Park
Gold medal – first place	2022 Chiba	Park
Gold medal – first place	2017 Minneapolis	Street Am
Silver medal – second place	2019 Minneapolis	Park
Silver medal – second place	2018 Norway	Street
Silver medal – second place	2018 Minneapolis	Street
Bronze medal – third place	2016 Austin	Street Am

Jagger Geoffrey Eaton (born February 21, 2001) is an American professional skateboarder who competes in street and park competitions. He was the youngest ever X Games competitor at age 11, until his record was broken in 2019. In 2021, Eaton won the first Olympic skateboarding medal, earning a bronze in the men's street competition in Tokyo, Japan. Eaton won Silver in the 2024 Olympic men's street event at 2024 Summer Olympics in Paris, France.

== Early life ==
Eaton and his brother Jett (two years his senior) are the sons of Geoff Eaton, owner of the Kids That Rip (KTR) Skateboard School, a school that trains a number of junior X Games competitors. Both brothers started skateboarding under their father's tutelage at a young age, with Eaton commencing at four years of age. He is the son of Shelly Schaerer, a member of the United States national gymnastics team from 1985 to 1989.

== Career ==
Along with his brother Jett and fellow junior skater Tom Schaar, Eaton was sponsored by DC Shoes as part of their 2012 initiative, the "DC Youth Division". Transworld Skateboarding magazine's Blair Alley called the brothers "the future of vert skating".

Eaton was featured in the Esquire Magazine: Life of Man 80th Anniversary edition that was published in October 2013.

A number of regular skateboarding commentators have been critical of Eaton's participation at professional-level skateboarding events, including Bob Burnquist who believes that separate junior divisions should be established for competitions. David Daniels of Bleacher Report suggested that Eaton's entry (and that of others his age) in professional competitions harms the credibility of skateboarding in the sporting context.

Eaton appeared on episodes of Rob Dyrdek's Fantasy Factory and Ridiculousness that aired in January 2015. A reality TV series named Jagger Eaton's Mega Life aired in September 2016 on Nickelodeon. He also appeared on the September 13 Episode of WWE SmackDown in a backstage segment with The Miz.

=== Sponsors ===
As of December 2022, Eaton is sponsored by Cariuma Shoes, The Heart Supply Skateboards, Red Bull, Bones Wheels, Independent Truck Company, Mob Griptape and KTR Skateboard School.

== Competition history ==
At age 11, Eaton competed at the 2012 X Games in Los Angeles, United States, becoming the youngest ever X Games competitor breaking the record set by Nyjah Huston at the 2006 Games (Gui Khury later broke Eaton's record at the 2019 X Games, competing at the age of 10 years, 7 months). The previous year, Eaton had competed at Bob Burnquist's Dreamland MegaRamp Invitational and tied for 3rd place in the amateur division.

In December 2014, Eaton won Tampa Am, in Tampa, Florida, U.S. Aged 13, he is one of the youngest skateboarders to win the competition.

In February 2015, Eaton won the BoardrAm, in Houston, Texas, U.S. This win earned Eaton an invitation to the BoardrAm finals at the X Games 2015 in Austin, Texas.

In July 2021, Eaton won the bronze medal for the United States in Men's Street Skateboarding at the 2020 Olympic Games in Tokyo, Japan.

In July 2024, Eaton won the silver medal for the United States in Men's Street Skateboarding at the 2024 Olympic Games in Paris, France.

=== 2012 ===
- X Games, Los Angeles

- Big Air – 12th place

=== 2013 ===
- Global X Games, Munich

- Big Air – 4th place

- Global X Games, Barcelona

- Big Air – 6th place

- X Games, Los Angeles

- Big Air – 4th place

- Kimberly Diamond Cup, South Africa

- Vert and Big Air (combined) Competition – 8th place (Vert) and equal 2nd place (Big Air)
- Street Competition – 17th place
- Big Air Best Trick Gap Competition – 1st place

=== 2014 ===
- Tampa AM

- Street – 1st place

=== 2015 ===
- BoardAm
  - Street – 1st place

=== 2016 ===
- X Games Austin
  - Street Am – 3rd place

=== 2017 ===
- X Games Minneapolis
  - Street Am – 1st place

=== 2018 ===
- Tampa Pro
  - 1st place
- X Games Norway
  - Street – 2nd place
- X Games Minneapolis
  - Street – 2nd place

=== 2019 ===
- X Games Minneapolis
  - Park - 2nd place

=== 2021 ===
- Tokyo Olympic Games – USA Skateboarding Team
  - Street – Bronze
- SLS Super Crown World Championship
  - Street – 1st place

=== 2022 ===
- X Games Chiba
  - Park - 1st place

=== 2024 ===
- Paris Summer Olympics – USA Skateboarding Team
  - Street – Silver

== Filmography ==
Television roles
Year	Title	Role	Note
2015	Ridiculousness	Himself	Episode 5.3
2016–17	Jagger Eaton's Mega Life	Himself	Host
