= Jazmín Álvarez =

Colombian street skateboarder

Personal information
- Full name: Jazmín Alexandra Álvarez Bedoya
- Born: December 8, 1999 (age 26)
- Occupation: Professional skateboarder

Sport
- Country: Colombia
- Sport: Skateboarding
- Event: Street
Medal record
Representing Colombia
Women's skateboarding
Central American and Caribbean Beach Games
Gold medal – first place	2022 Santa Marta	Street
South American Games
Silver medal – second place	2026 Santa Fe	Street
Bronze medal – third place	2022 Asuncion	Street
South American Beach Games
Bronze medal – third place	2023 Santa Marta	Street
Bolivarian Games
Gold medal – first place	2025 Lima-Ayacucho	Street

Jazmín Álvarez (born 1999) is a Colombian street skateboarder. She competed at the 2022 South American Games in the roller sports competition, winning the bronze medal in the women's street event.
