= Roller sports at the 2023 Pan American Games – Men's street =

Men's street at the 2023 Pan American Games
- Venue: Urban Sports Esplanade
- Dates: October 21
- Competitors: 8 from 8 nations
- Winning score: 264.45

Medalists
Gold medal	Lucas Rabelo	Brazil
Silver medal	Ángelo Caro	Peru
Bronze medal	Jhancarlos González	Colombia

The men's street competition of the roller sports events at the 2023 Pan American Games was held on October 21 at the Urban Sports Esplanade in Santiago, Chile.

== Schedule ==
Date	Time	Round
October 21, 2023	16:30	Final

== Results ==
Rank	Skateboarder	Nation	Run		Trick					Total				
Rank	Skateboarder	Nation	1st place, gold medalist(s)	Lucas Rabelo	Brazil	79.55	~~9.07~~	~~89.54~~	91.15	Total	93.75	~~0.00~~	~~0.00~~	264.45
2nd place, silver medalist(s)	Ángelo Caro	Peru	72.50	~~50.98~~	~~0.00~~	~~86.65~~	90.31	~~0.00~~	93.99	256.80				
3rd place, bronze medalist(s)	Jhancarlos González	Colombia	76.55	~~30.70~~	~~75.61~~	89.61	~~0.00~~	~~76.73~~	81.66	247.82				
4	Ryan Decenzo	Canada	66.34	~~51.84~~	84.41	~~0.00~~	~~83.75~~	~~0.00~~	85.54	236.29				
5	Matías Dell Olio	Argentina	49.63	~~32.08~~	82.63	~~0.00~~	83.72	~~82.22~~	~~0.00~~	215.98				
6	Ronald Ramírez	Chile	42.53	~~40.65~~	~~0.00~~	~~0.00~~	~~0.00~~	60.11	66.54	169.18				
7	Emanuel Santiago	Puerto Rico	64.45	~~48.08~~	~~0.00~~	80.20	~~0.00~~	0.00	~~0.00~~	144.65				
8	Gabryel Aguilar	Brazil	~~69.52~~	70.15	~~0.00~~	~~0.00~~	65.76	~~0.00~~	0.00	135.91				
