= Jagger Eaton's Mega Life =

- Genre: Docuseries
- Starring: Jagger Eaton
- Country of origin: United States
- Original language: English
- No. of seasons: 1
- No. of episodes: 20

Production
- Executive producers: Rob Dyrdek; Shane Nickerson; Erin Ryder
- Running time: 22 minutes
- Production companies: Superjacket Productions; Nickelodeon Productions

Original release
- Network: Nickelodeon
- Release: September 9, 2016 – April 2, 2017

Jagger Eaton's Mega Life is an American docuseries that aired on Nickelodeon from September 9, 2016, to April 2, 2017. The series stars Jagger Eaton.

== Episodes ==
No.	Title	Location	Original release date	Prod. code	U.S. viewers (millions)
1	"Hometown Hero"	Phoenix, Arizona	September 9, 2016	104	0.96
2	"Big Air, Up There"	Jackson Hole, Wyoming	September 16, 2016	102	0.96
3	"Need for Speed"	Charlotte, North Carolina	September 23, 2016	106	0.88
4	"Alaskan Adventures"	Anchorage, Alaska	September 30, 2016	103	0.78
5	"Jagger Jumps the Shark"	Nassau, Bahamas	October 7, 2016	107	0.94
6	"Grinding Rails"	Park City, Utah	October 18, 2016	101	0.82
7	"Wake 'n Wild"	Orlando, Florida	October 25, 2016	108	0.73
8	"Mini-Mega, Big Photo"	Woodward, Pennsylvania	November 1, 2016	109	0.90
9	"Climbing Rocks!"	Scottsdale, Arizona	November 8, 2016	110	0.91
10	"Dance Battle"	Las Vegas, Nevada	November 15, 2016	105	1.02
11	"How to Train Your Bear"	Santa Clarita, California	January 8, 2017	111	0.76
12	"A Knight to Remember"	Eagle Mountain, Utah	January 15, 2017	114	0.73
13	"Surfing Safari"	San Clemente, California	January 22, 2017	113	0.75
14	"Speed Racers"	Annapolis, Maryland	January 29, 2017	116	0.75
15	"Sumo Style"	Los Angeles, California	February 19, 2017	115	0.67
16	"A Slam Dunk"	Santa Barbara, California	February 26, 2017	112	0.83
17	"Mega Ramp-Up"	Carlsbad, California	March 5, 2017	118	0.65
18	"Dueling Brothers"	New York City, New York	March 19, 2017	117	0.79
19	"Record Breakers"	Los Angeles, California	March 26, 2017	120	0.86
20	"Action Heroes"	Hollywood, California	April 2, 2017	119	0.80

== Ratings ==
Viewership and ratings per season of Jagger Eaton's Mega Life
Season	Episodes	First aired		Last aired		Avg. viewers (millions)
Season	Episodes	Date	Viewers (millions)	Date	Viewers (millions)	Avg. viewers (millions)
1	20	September 9, 2016	0.96	April 2, 2017	0.80	0.82
