= Richard Tury =

Slovak skateboarder (born 1993)

Personal information
- Nickname: Rišo
- Nationality: Slovakia
- Born: 10 June 1993 (age 32) Košice, Slovakia
- Height: 183 cm (6 ft 0 in)
- Weight: 83 kg (183 lb)

Sport
- Country: Slovakia
- Sport: Skateboarding
- Rank: 9th – street (August 2024)

Richard Tury (born 10 June 1993) is a Slovak professional skateboarder. Tury represented Slovakia at the 2024 Summer Olympics in Paris in the Men's street category, placing 5th in the final. He was the first ever skateboarder to represent Slovakia at the Olympic Games.

== Early life ==
Tury grew up in the Ťahanovce housing estates of Košice, Slovakia where he learned to skateboard starting from the age of 6. He picked up skateboarding due to the video game Tony Hawk's Pro Skater 2.

== Career ==
Tury placed 5th in the Men's street category at the 2022 World Skateboarding Championship in Sharjah, United Arab Emirates on 5 February 2023.
