= Erika Alarcón =

Paraguayan roller skater

Sport
- Country: Paraguay
- Sport: Artistic roller skating
Medal record
Artistic roller skating
World Championships
Bronze medal – third place	2023 Ibagué	Women's solo dance
South American Games
Gold medal – first place	2022 Asunción	Women's solo dance
Gold medal – first place	2026 Santa Fe	Women's solo dance

Erika Alarcón is a Paraguayan artistic roller skater that competes in solo dance. She participated at the 2022 South American Games in the roller sports competition, being awarded the gold medal in the women's solo dance event. She was the third person to win a gold medal for Paraguay in the competition.

At the 2023 Artistic Skating World Championship held in Ibagué, Colombia she became the first Paraguayan to with a medal, with her 3rd place at the Senior Ladies Solo Dance event.
