= Matías Dell Olio =

Argentine skateboarder (born 1996)

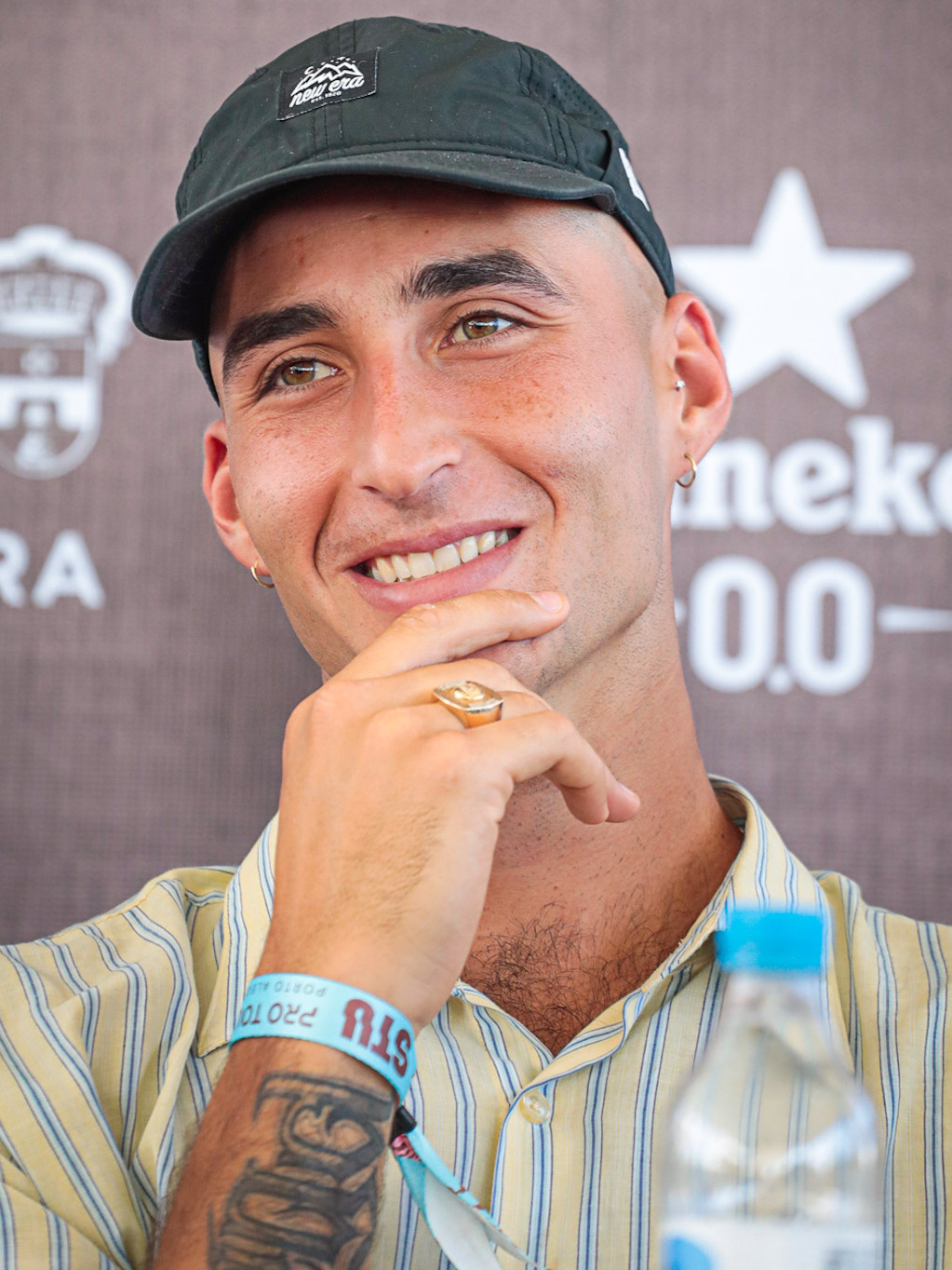
- Dell Olio in 2025

Personal information
- Born: 19 October 1996 (age 29) Mar del Plata, Argentina

Sport
- Country: Argentina
- Sport: Skateboarding
- Position: Goofy-footed
- Event: Street
Medal record
Men's street skateboarding
Representing Argentina
World Championships
Silver medal – second place	2024 Rome	Street

Matías Dell Olio (born 19 October 1996) is an Argentine skateboarder. He represented Argentina at the 2024 Summer Olympics. He is a World Skateboarding Championship silver medalist.

== Career ==
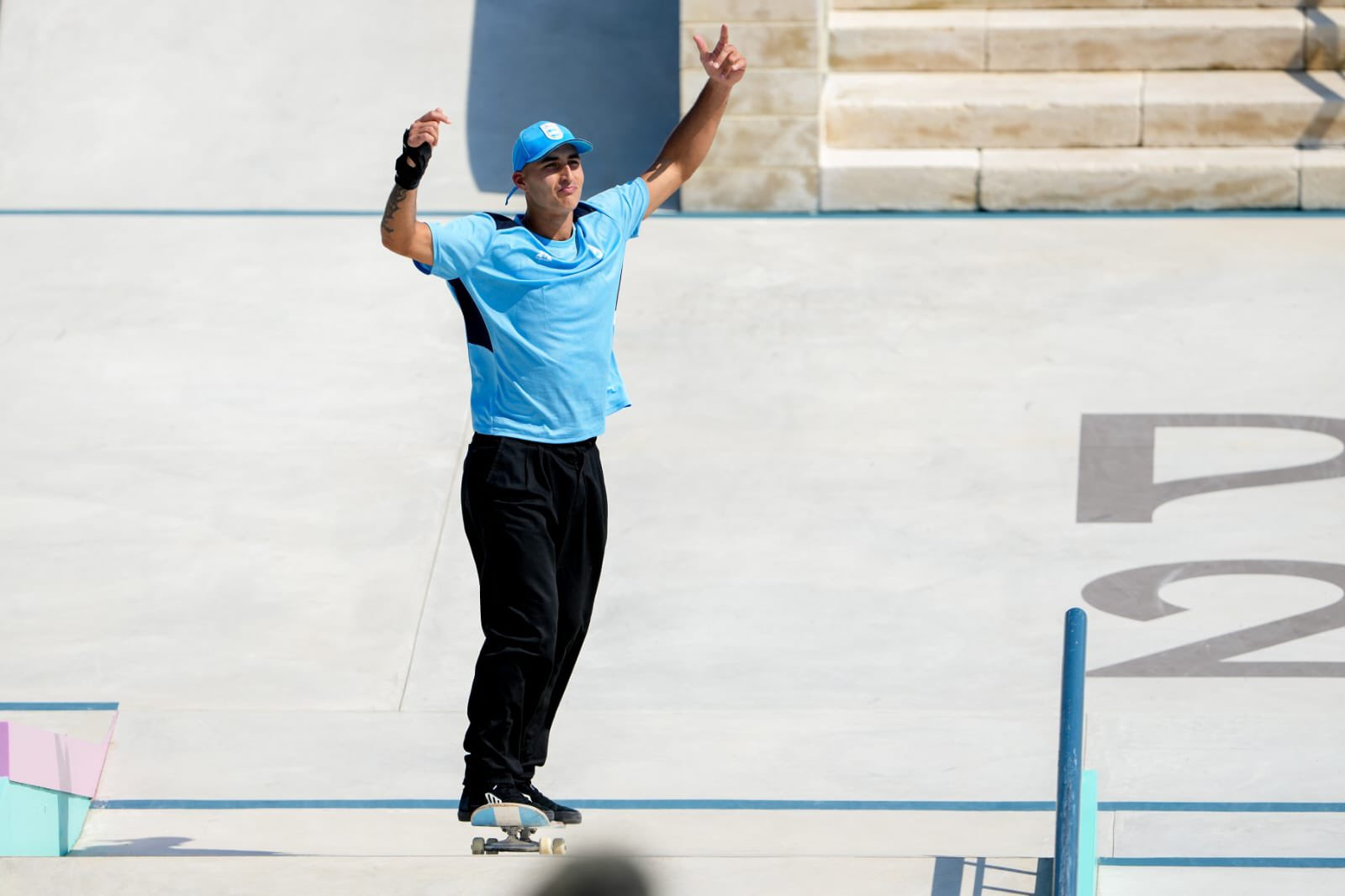
Dell Olio at the 2024 Summer Olympics

In October 2023, Dell Olio competed at the 2023 Pan American Games in the street event and finished in fifth place with a score of 215.98.

During the second leg of the 2024 Olympic Qualifier Series in Budapest, Del Olio finished in fifth place. He ranked 11th in the Olympic World Skateboarding rankings, and qualified for the 2024 Summer Olympics, becoming the first Argentine skateboarder to compete at the Summer Olympic Games. During the street event he ranked fifth in the semifinals with a score of 266.8. During the finals, he finished in eighth place with a score of 153.98.

In September 2024, he competed at the World Skateboarding Championship. During the quarterfinals he had the highest score of 81.79 points. During the finals he won a silver medal with a score of 265.18.

== Violence and abuse allegations ==
Dell Olio has been the subject of multiple allegations of physical violence, gender-based violence and sexual abuse.

=== 2016 assault and threats complaint ===
In 2016, Dell Olio was the subject of a criminal complaint following an alleged assault on Luciano Ianuzzi, a 26-year-old contractor working at a skatepark in Buenos Aires.

According to Ianuzzi's family, Dell Olio confronted Ianuzzi while he was working at the skatepark. Ianuzzi's grandfather told Clarín that Dell Olio approached Ianuzzi from behind and punched him, knocking him to the ground, before kicking him while he was down. Ianuzzi was reportedly left unconscious for approximately a day and a half and hospitalized with a detached retina.

Ianuzzi's family filed a criminal complaint. His grandfather further alleged that Dell Olio subsequently went to the clinic where Ianuzzi was hospitalized, accompanied by two other people, and threatened the family after they confronted him about the incident. Clarín reported that police protection was subsequently provided to the family.

=== Gender-based violence and sexual abuse allegations ===
Dell Olio has also faced allegations of gender-based violence and sexual abuse. In 2023, Argentina Amateur Deporte reported allegations of physical violence made by skateboarder Camila Ruiz, Dell Olio's former partner and former teammate on Argentina's national skateboarding team. The publication also reported that Dell Olio was the subject of a criminal complaint alleging sexual abuse and another complaint involving women associated with the national team.

According to Argentina Amateur Deporte, a restraining order had been issued in connection with the sexual abuse complaint. The publication also reported that complainants met with gender departments of Argentina's Secretariat of Sports and the Argentine Skating Confederation (CAP). According to the report, Dell Olio had previously been excluded from the national team and lost his ENARD funding, but was later permitted to represent Argentina internationally.

In 2024, La Nación reported that allegations concerning gender-based violence and abuse involving Dell Olio had been before the Argentine justice system for years and remained awaiting judicial rulings at the time of publication.

When La Nación questioned Dell Olio about the allegations during the 2024 Summer Olympics, he declined to address their substance, saying that he preferred to let his skateboarding speak for him and that criticism did not affect him.
