= Slovakia at the 2024 Summer Olympics =

- IOC code: SVK
- NOC: Slovak Olympic and Sports Committee
- Website: www.olympic.sk (in Slovak)

in Paris, France 26 July 2024 – 11 August 2024
- Competitors: 28 (14 men and 14 women) in 13 sports
- Flag bearers: Jakub Grigar & Zuzana Paňková
- Medals Ranked 84th: Gold 0 Silver 0 Bronze 1 Total 1

Summer Olympics appearances (overview)
- 1996; 2000; 2004; 2008; 2012; 2016; 2020; 2024

Other related appearances
- Hungary (1896–1912); Czechoslovakia (1924–1992)

Slovakia competed at the 2024 Summer Olympics in Paris from 26 July to 11 August 2024. It was the nation's eighth consecutive appearance at the Summer Olympics after gaining its independence from the former Czechoslovakia.

Slovakia left the Olympics with only a bronze medal, won by Matej Beňuš in Men's C-1 slalom canoeing, marking the country's least successful Summer Olympics since its independence. Despite the single medal, Slovak athletes produced multiple surprises and high finishes in their respective disciplines, including Richard Tury in Men's street skateboarding, Anna Karolína Schmiedlová in Women's tennis singles, or Vanesa Hocková and Danka Barteková in Women's skeet shooting.

== Medalists ==
Medal	Name	Sport	Event	Date
Bronze	Matej Beňuš	Canoeing	Men's slalom C-1	29 July

Medals by sport
Sport	1st place, gold medalist(s)	2nd place, silver medalist(s)	3rd place, bronze medalist(s)	Total
Canoeing	0	0	1	1
Total	0	0	1	1

Medals by gender
Gender	1st place, gold medalist(s)	2nd place, silver medalist(s)	3rd place, bronze medalist(s)	Total
Male	0	0	1	1
Female	0	0	0	0
Mixed	0	0	0	0
Total	0	0	1	1

Medals by date
Date	1st place, gold medalist(s)	2nd place, silver medalist(s)	3rd place, bronze medalist(s)	Total
29 July	0	0	1	1
Total	0	0	1	1

== Competitors ==
The following is the list of number of competitors in the Games.

Sport	Men	Women	Total
Archery	0	1	1
Athletics	2	4	6
Boxing	0	1	1
Canoeing	2	2	4
Cycling	1	1	2
Judo	1	0	1
Sailing	1	0	1
Shooting	3	3	6
Skateboarding	1	0	1
Swimming	1	1	2
Table tennis	1	0	1
Tennis	0	1	1
Wrestling	1	0	1
Total	14	14	28

== Archery ==
One Slovak archer qualified for the 2024 Summer Olympics women's individual recurve competitions by virtue of her result at the 2024 Final Qualification Tournament in Antalya, Turkey.

Athlete	Event	Ranking round		Round of 64	Round of 32	Round of 16	Quarterfinals	Semifinals	Final / BM	
Athlete	Event	Score	Seed	Opposition Score	Opposition Score	Opposition Score	Opposition Score	Opposition Score	Opposition Score	Rank
Denisa Baránková	Women's individual	636	48	Cordeau (FRA); L 3–7	Did not advance					

== Athletics ==
Slovak track and field athletes achieved the entry standards for Paris 2024, either by passing the direct qualifying mark (or time for track and road races) or by world ranking, in the following events (a maximum of 3 athletes each):

Key

- Note–Ranks given for track events are within the athlete's heat only
- Q = Qualified for the next round
- q = Qualified for the next round as a fastest loser or, in field events, by position without achieving the qualifying target
- NR = National record
- N/A = Round not applicable for the event
- Bye = Athlete not required to compete in round

Track and road events
Men

Athlete	Event	Heat		Repechage		Semifinal		Final	
Athlete	Event	Result	Rank	Result	Rank	Result	Rank	Result	Rank
Dominik Černý	20 km walk	—N/a						1:23:25	34

Women

Athlete	Event	Heat		Repechage		Semifinal		Final	
Athlete	Event	Result	Rank	Result	Rank	Result	Rank	Result	Rank
Viktória Forster	100 m	11.44	6	Did not advance					
Viktória Forster	100 m hurdles	13.08	6	12.88	3	Did not advance			
Gabriela Gajanová	800 m	2:00.29	2 Q	Bye		1:58.22 NR	11	Did not advance	
Mária Czaková	20 km walk	—N/a						1:34:46	34
Hana Burzalová	20 km walk	—N/a						1:36:12	37

Mixed

Athlete	Event	Heat		Repechage		Semifinal		Final	
Athlete	Event	Result	Rank	Result	Rank	Result	Rank	Result	Rank
Hana Burzalová; Dominik Černý	Mixed marathon walk relay	—N/a						3:03:54	18

== Boxing ==
Slovakia entered one boxer into the Olympic tournament. Jessica Triebeľová (women's welterweight) secured her spot following the triumph in quota bouts round, at the 2024 World Olympic Qualification Tournament 2 in Bangkok, Thailand.

Athlete	Event	Round of 32	Round of 16	Quarterfinals	Semifinals	Final	
Athlete	Event	Opposition Result	Opposition Result	Opposition Result	Opposition Result	Opposition Result	Rank
Jessica Triebeľová	Women's 66 kg	Alcinda Panguana (MOZ); L 0–5	Did not advance				

== Canoeing ==
=== Slalom ===
Slovakia entered four boats into the slalom competition, for the Games through the 2023 ICF Canoe Slalom World Championships in London, Great Britain.

Athlete	Event	Preliminary						Semifinal		Final	
Athlete	Event	Run 1	Rank	Run 2	Rank	Best	Rank	Time	Rank	Time	Rank
Matej Beňuš	Men's C-1	100.28	15	94.91	5	94.91	11 Q	102.59	11 Q	97.03	3rd place, bronze medalist(s)
Jakub Grigar	Men's K-1	87.10	6	91.80	15	87.10	9 Q	92.00	5 Q	90.21	6
Zuzana Paňková	Women's C-1	103.27	4	105.71	5	103.27	4 Q	115.59	9 Q	111.07	4
Eliška Mintálová	Women's K-1	95.67	3	99.76	18	95.67	9 Q	103.07	6 Q	102.98	9

=== Kayak cross ===
Athlete	Event	Time trial	Rank	Round 1	Repechage	Heat	Quarterfinal	Semifinal	Small Final	Final	
Athlete	Event	Time trial	Rank	Position	Position	Position	Position	Position	Position	Position	Rank
Matej Beňuš	Men's KX-1	73.54	23	3 R	3	Did not advance					34
Jakub Grigar	Men's KX-1	71.18	19	2 Q	Bye	2 Q	2 Q	3 SM	2	—N/a	6
Zuzana Paňková	Women's KX-1	79.36	30	3 R	3	Did not advance					35
Eliška Mintálová	Women's KX-1	75.26	20	2 Q	Bye	4	Did not advance				27

== Cycling ==
=== Road ===
Slovakia entered one male and one female rider to compete in the road race events at the Olympic. Slovakia secured those quota through the UCI Nation Ranking.

Athlete	Event	Time	Rank
Lukáš Kubiš	Men's road race	6:23:16	29
Nora Jenčušová	Women's road race	4:10:47	71
Nora Jenčušová	Women's time trial	44:22.30	25

== Judo ==
For the first time since 2012, Slovakia qualified one judoka for the following weight class at the Games. Márius Fízeľ (men's heavyweight, +100 kg) qualified via IJF Olympic point rankings.

Athlete	Event	Round of 64	Round of 32	Round of 16	Quarterfinals	Repechage	Semifinals	Final / BM	
Athlete	Event	Opposition Result	Opposition Result	Opposition Result	Opposition Result	Opposition Result	Opposition Result	Opposition Result	Rank
Márius Fízeľ	Men's +100 kg	—N/a	Takayawa (FIJ); W 10–0	Alisher Yusupov (UZB); L 0–10	Did not advance				

== Sailing ==
For the first time since 2008, Slovak sailors secured a quota place in the men's IQFoil, through the allocations of Emerging Nations Programs.

Elimination events

Athlete	Event	Race																									Final rank
Athlete	Event	1	2	3	4	5	6	7	8	9	10	11	12	13	QF	SF1	SF2	SF3	SF4	SF5	SF6	F1	F2	F3	F4	F5	Final rank
Robert Kubín	Men's IQFoil	19	10	16	18	23	21	14	21	19	22	20	20	20	Did not advance												

== Shooting ==
Slovak shooters achieved quota places for the following events based on their results at the 2022 and 2023 ISSF World Championships, 2022, 2023, and 2024 European Championships, 2023 European Games, and 2024 ISSF World Olympic Qualification Tournament.

Athlete	Event	Qualification		Final	
Athlete	Event	Points	Rank	Points	Rank
Patrik Jány	Men's 10 m air rifle	628	20	Did not advance	
Patrik Jány	Men's 50 metre rifle three positions	589-34x	10	Did not advance	
Juraj Tužinský	Men's 10 m air pistol	571	25	Did not advance	
Marián Kovačócy	Men's trap	117	26	Did not advance	
Zuzana Rehák-Štefečeková	Women's trap	117	12	Did not advance	
Vanesa Hocková	Women's skeet	121	4 Q	34	4
Danka Barteková	Women's skeet	120	6 Q	17	6

== Skateboarding ==
Slovakia was represented by one skateboarder, who achieved a quota spot from the combined results of the Olympic World Skateboarding Rankings and the 2024 Olympic Qualifier Series and marking the nation's debut at this sport.

Athlete	Event	Qualification		Final	
Athlete	Event	Score	Rank	Score	Rank
Richard Tury	Men's street	257.99	8	273.98	5

== Swimming ==
Slovakia sent two swimmers to compete at the 2024 Paris Olympics.

Athlete	Event	Heat		Semifinal		Final	
Athlete	Event	Time	Rank	Time	Rank	Time	Rank
Matej Duša	Men's 50 m freestyle	22.64	39	Did not advance			
Tamara Potocká	Women's 200 m medley	2:14.20	23	Did not advance			

== Table tennis ==
Slovakia entered one table tennis player into the games. Wang Yang secured his spot at the Games by virtue of winning the last available places for men's single event, at the 2024 European Qualification Tournament in Sarajevo, Bosnia and Herzegovina.

Athlete	Event	Preliminary	Round of 64	Quarterfinals	Semifinals	Final
Athlete	Event	Opposition Result	Opposition Result	Opposition Result	Opposition Result	Rank
Wang Yang	Men's singles	Bye	Wang C (CHN); L 1–4	Did not advance		

== Tennis ==
Slovakia has entered one tennis player into the Olympic tournament. Anna Karolína Schmiedlová (world no. 80) qualified directly as one of the top 58 eligible players in the women's singles based on the WTA World Rankings of June 10, 2024.

Athlete	Event	Round of 64	Round of 32	Round of 16	Quarterfinals	Semifinals	Final / BM	
Athlete	Event	Opposition Score	Opposition Score	Opposition Score	Opposition Score	Opposition Score	Opposition Score	Rank
Anna Karolína Schmiedlová	Women's singles	Boulter (GBR); W 6–4, 6–2	Haddad Maia (BRA); W 6–4, 6–4	Paolini (ITA); W 7–5, 3–6, 7–5	Krejčíková (CZE); W 6–4, 6–2	Vekić (CRO); L 4–6, 0–6	Świątek (POL); L 2–6, 1–6	4

== Wrestling ==
Slovakia qualified one wrestler for the following class into the Olympic competition. Tajmuraz Salkazanov qualified for the games through the 2024 World Qualification Tournament in Istanbul, Turkey.

Key:

- VFA (ranking points: 5–0 or 0–5) – Victory by fall.
- VIN (ranking points: 5–0 or 0–5) – Victory by injury.
- VFO (ranking points: 5–0 or 0–5) – Victory by forfeit.
- VPO (ranking points: 3–0 or 0–3) – Decision by points – the loser without technical points.
- VPO1 (ranking points: 3–1 or 1–3) – Decision by points – the loser with technical points.
- VSU (ranking points: 4–0 or 0–4) – Great superiority – the loser without technical points and a margin of victory of at least 8 (Greco-Roman) or 10 (freestyle) points.
- VSU1 (ranking points: 4–1 or 1–4) – Technical superiority – the loser with technical points and a margin of victory of at least 8 (Greco-Roman) or 10 (freestyle) points.

Freestyle

Athlete	Event	Round of 16	Quarterfinal	Semifinal	Repechage Round 1	Repechage Round 2	Repechage Round 3	Final / BM	
Athlete	Event	Opposition Result	Opposition Result	Opposition Result	Opposition Result	Opposition Result	Opposition Result	Opposition Result	Rank
Tajmuraz Salkazanov	Men's −74 kg	Zhamalov (UZB); L 3–11	Did not advance		Kadzimahamedau (AIN); L 6–6^{VPO1}	Did not advance			10

== See also ==
- Slovakia at the Olympics
- Slovakia at the 2024 Winter Youth Olympics
