= Erin Ryder =

American explorer and photographer

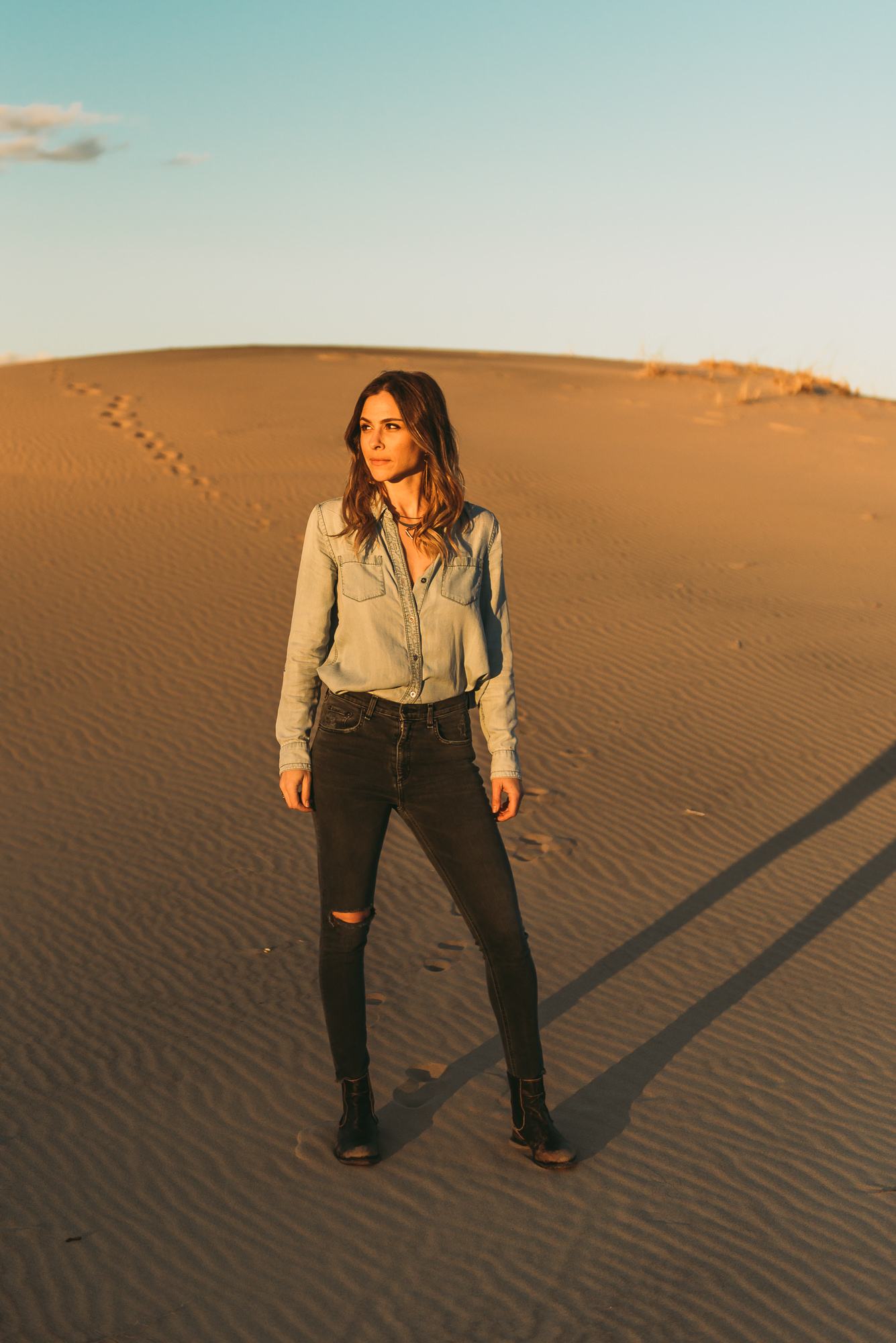
- Ryder in 2019
- Born: Erin Leigh Ryder; August 14, 1980 (age 45); New York
- Occupations: Director; Television Producer
- Known for: Prime Video US Sports; Destination Truth
- Website: erinryder.com

Erin Ryder (born 1980) is an American producer and director in television and digital media. She co-Founded Pax Pictures, a female-led production company.

== Career ==
Ryder executive produced The Other Half for Facebook Watch. A women's international football docuseries showcasing the superstars helping to shape the women's game. Ryder also worked with footballer, and former refugee Nadia Nadim and the Danish Refugee Council to highlight the Kakuma Refugee Camp and its football programs, which makes a difference in the lives of the refugees. Ryder helped lead creative and marketing efforts for Amazon Prime Video US Sports including the first exclusive season of Thursday Night Football, as well as the WNBA and NY Yankees. She was also the show runner on Nickelodeon's Jagger Eaton's Mega Life, its first live action sports series, as well as Challenge Accepted, a series about young athletes for YouTube.

Throughout her career, Ryder has produced and directed docuseries and live events for NBC, ESPN, National Geographic, Amazon Studios, Nickelodeon and Peloton. She cut her teeth producing the open, bumps and teases for the 2004 Olympics in Athens, but more recently Ryder helped lead marketing efforts on Amazon's first exclusive season of Thursday Night Football, as well as many sports docuseries like Good Rivals and Coach Prime. Ryder won two Clio Awards for her work marketing The Wilds (TV Series) Season 2.

Ryder has worked on John Legend's new project Humanlevel.

== Early life ==
Ryder was born in New York and resides in Nashville, Tennessee. She has degrees in Communication and Computer Applications from State University of New York at Cortland, where she graduated with honors in 2002, along with an All-American title and a National Championship in field hockey.

== Chasing UFOs ==
Ryder, Ben McGee and James Fox, starred in the National Geographic series Chasing UFOs, which premiered on Friday June 29, 2012. The show focuses on a team of investigators who set out to investigate reports of UFO sightings across the United States, frequently interviewing eyewitnesses. Ryder is also the co-executive producer for the series.

== Myth Explorer ==
In 2016 Ryder produced and starred in the web series Myth Explorer for Universal Studios. It follows her and her crew as they explore an island that doesn't appear on any official map—a rocky, skull-shaped jungle in the Indian Ocean where they say the story of King Kong originated. It centers around the 2005 film. The online series launched to promote the upcoming King Kong attraction: Skull Island: Reign of Kong. The series was promoted on SyFy and included an extra teaser on NBC.
