= Lauridsen Skatepark =

Public skatepark

- Interactive map of Lauridsen Skatepark
- Type: Skate park
- Location: Des Moines, Iowa, United States
- Coordinates: 41°35′39″N 93°37′9″W
- Established: May 7, 2021; 5 years ago
- Website: dsmskatepark.com

Lauridsen Skatepark, at 88,000 ft^{2} (8,200 m^{2}), is currently (as of July 2021) the largest public skatepark in the United States. Opening on 7 May 2021, it was designed by project engineer and landscape architect Tim West, alongside Shane Tully of Snyder & Associates with support from California Skateparks, Landscape Architects and Structural Engineers, Polk County Public Works and the City of Des Moines and is located along the west bank the Des Moines River, at 901 2nd Avenue in downtown Des Moines, Iowa, which is on riverfront property near Second Avenue and School Street just northeast of Wells Fargo Arena.

The Lauridsen Skatepark held the only Olympic skateboarding qualifying event in North America sanctioned by World Skate for the 2021 Olympics in Tokyo.

The park has been used for competitions and exhibitions. Citizens have painted several murals on it since it opened. In May 2023, vandals caused thousands of dollars' worth of property damage to the park's bathrooms. This prompted the facilities to close earlier. Additionally in 2023 it was proposed a neighboring dog park be converted into a much-needed parking lot.
