= Deivid Tuesta =

Peruvian street skateboarder

Personal information
- Full name: Deivid Anderson Tuesta Mota
- Born: 4 June 2002 (age 24)

Sport
- Country: Peru
- Sport: Street skateboarding
Medal record
Men's skateboarding
Representing Peru
South American Games
Gold medal – first place	2022 Asuncion	Street

Deivid Anderson Tuesta Mota (Note: In this Spanish name, the first or paternal surname is Tuesta and the second or maternal family name is Mota.) (born 4 June 2002), also spelled Deyvid, is a Peruvian street skateboarder. He participated at the 2022 South American Games in the roller sports competition, being awarded the gold medal in the men's street event. He was the first person to win a gold medal for Peru at the 2022 South American Games.
