= Ángelo Caro =

Peruvian skateboarder (born 1999)

Personal information
- Full name: Ángelo Caro Narváez
- Born: 27 August 1999 (age 27) Chiclayo, Peru

Sport
- Country: Peru
- Sport: Skateboarding

Achievements and titles
- Olympic finals: 5th (2020)
Medal record
Men's skateboarding
Representing Peru
World Championships
Silver medal – second place	2025 São Paulo	Street
Pan American Games
Silver medal – second place	2023 Santiago	Street
South American Games
Gold medal – first place	2026 Santa Fe	Street
South American Beach Games
Bronze medal – third place	2019 Rosario	Street
Bolivarian Games
Gold medal – first place	2025 Lima-Ayacucho	Street
Junior Pan American Games
Silver medal – second place	2021 Cali-Valle	Street

Ángelo Caro Narváez (Note: In this Spanish name, the first or paternal surname is Caro and the second or maternal family name is Narváez.) (born 27 August 1999) is a Peruvian skateboarder. He has competed in the World Championships, Pan American Games, South American Games, South American Beach Games and Bolivarian Games, winning a medal in each of them. He competed in the men's street event at the 2020 Summer Olympics.

== Career ==
In 2014, Caro won the DC Pro National Championship. The following year, he finished in second place Red Bull Skate Arcade held in Portugal as well as finishing in 5th place at Grind for Life held in the United States. In 2017, he won the Pan American National Championship held in Colombia.

In 2019, Caro competed at the South American Beach Games and won the gold medal in his event. He also competed at the World Skate SLS Super Crown World Championship held in Brazil and finished in seventh place. This led him to qualify for the men's street event at the 2020 Summer Olympics, where he finished in fifth place. He then competed at the 2021 Junior Pan American Games, where he was one of his country's flagbearers and won a gold medal.

In 2022, Caro won the Urban World Series and also competed at the 2022 South American Games, both in which he competed in the men's street event. In 2023, he competed at the 2023 Pan American Games and won a silver medal.

In December 2025, Caro competed at the 2025 Bolivarian Games and won a gold medal. He then competed at the 2025 World Skateboarding Championship, which were postponed until March 2026, and won a silver medal in the street event with a score of 83.90. He competed in the men's street event at the 2026 South American Games and won the gold medal.

== Major results ==
2014

- DC Pro National Champion
- Sk8session National Champion
- Nike Champs National Champion

2015

- 2nd Red Bull Skate Arcade - Portugal
- 5th Grind for Life - United States

2016

- 9th Tampa Am – United States

2017

- 12th Damn Am New York – United States
- Pan American National Champion - Colombia

2018

- 3rd Tampa Am – United States
- 11th Damn Am Chicago – United States
- 6th WCS Green Anger – Austria
- 6th WCS Mystic Sk8 Cup – Czech Republic
- 5th Rey de Reyes - Chile

2019

- Nass Festival Invitational Skate Champion – England
- WCS Mystic Sk8 Cup Champion – Czech Republic
- Barcelona European Open Champion - Spain
- 3rd WCS Far´n High - France
- 3rd WCS O’Marisquino - Spain
- 6th World Skate OI STU Open – Brazil
- 7th World Skate SLS Super Crown World Championship – Brazil
- Semifinals World Skate Street League Pro Tour – United States
- 8th World Skate London - England

2020

- 5th Rey de Reyes - Chile 12th Tampa Pro – United States
- Perú National Champion
- 12th Tampa Pro - United States

2021

- 14th Dew Tour – United States
- 5th 2020 Summer Olympics.

2022

- Urban World Series Champion - España
