= Micky Papa =

Canadian-Italian skateboarder

Personal information
- Born: August 31, 1990 (age 36) Burnaby, British Columbia, Canada
- Height: 172 cm (5 ft 8 in)
- Weight: 99 kg (218 lb)

Micky Papa (born August 31, 1990) is a Canadian skateboarder, competing in the street discipline. Papa currently resides in Van Nuys, California.

== Career ==
At the 2021 Street Skateboarding World Championships Papa finished in eighth.

In June 2021, Papa was named to Canada's 2020 Olympic team, in the inaugural skateboarding competition. Papa competed in the Tokyo 2020 Olympics Men's Street competition, placing 10th in the semifinal round, not advancing to the finals.
