= Jhancarlos González =

Colombian street skateboarder (born 1997)

Personal information
- Full name: Luis Jhancarlos González Ortiz
- Born: 14 March 1997 (age 29) Samaná, Colombia
- Occupation: Professional skateboarder

Sport
- Country: Colombia
- Sport: Skateboarding
- Position: Regular-footed
- Rank: 25th
- Event: Street
Medal record
Men's skateboarding
Representing Colombia
World Championships
Bronze medal – third place	2024 Rome	Street
Pan American Games
Bronze medal – third place	2023 Santiago	Street
Central American and Caribbean Games
Gold medal – first place	2026 Santo Domingo	Street
Central American and Caribbean Beach Games
Silver medal – second place	2022 Santa Marta	Street
South American Games
Silver medal – second place	2022 Asunción	Street
Bolivarian Games
Silver medal – second place	2025 Lima-Ayacucho	Street

Luis Jhancarlos González Ortiz (Note: In this Spanish name, the first or paternal surname is González and the second or maternal family name is Ortiz.) (born 14 March 1997) is a Colombian skateboarder. He took gold during the 31st Dew Tour Mens Street Open Qualifiers. He was 15th in the Mens Street Qualifiers in the 2020 Summer Olympics.
