= Daba =

Daba may refer to:

- RAF El Daba, Daba, Egypt
- Daba language, spoken in Cameroon and Nigeria
- Daba (settlement), a Georgian equivalent of an urban-type settlement
- 2,4-Diaminobutyric acid

== China ==
- Daba (religion), a native religion of the Mosuo people, an ethnic group in Yunnan and Sichuan Provinces in China
- Daba Mountains (大巴山), mountain range in Central China

=== Towns ===
- Daba, Gansu (大坝), in Minqin County, Gansu
- Daba, Heping County (大坝), in Heping County, Guangdong
- Daba, Puning (大坝), in Puning, Guangdong
- Daba, Yangjiang (大八), in Yangjiang, Guangdong
- Daba, Guangxi (大坝), in Bobai County, Guangxi
- Daba, Guizhou (大坝), in Renhuai, Guizhou
- Daba, Liaoning (大巴), in Fuxin Mongol Autonomous County, Liaoning
- Daba, Ningxia (大坝), in Qingtongxia, Ningxia

=== Townships ===
- Daba Miao Ethnic Township (大坝苗族乡), in Xingwen County, Sichuan
- Daba or Danbab Township (达巴乡), in Zanda County, Tibet
- Daba Township, Zhaojue County (大坝乡), in Zhaojue County, Sichuan

== Given name ==
Daba (Amharic: ዳባ) is a male given name of Ethiopian origin.

- Tejitu Daba (born 1991), Ethiopian female long-distance runner competing for Bahrain
- Bekana Daba (born 1988), Ethiopian long-distance runner
- Demma Daba (born 1989), Ethiopian middle-distance runner
- Maru Daba (born 1980), Ethiopian steeplechase runner

== See also ==
- Dabas (disambiguation)
- Dibba, a region or city in the United Arab Emirates or Oman
