= 2023 World Taekwondo Championships – Women's flyweight =

Taekwondo competitions

Women's flyweight at the 2023 World Championships
- Venue: Baku Crystal Hall
- Dates: 31 May 2023
- Competitors: 56 from 54 nations

Medalists
gold medal	Merve Dinçel	Turkey
silver medal	Panipak Wongpattanakit	Thailand
bronze medal	Adriana Cerezo	Spain
bronze medal	Bruna Duvančić	Croatia

The women's flyweight is a competition featured at the 2023 World Taekwondo Championships, and was held at the Baku Crystal Hall in Baku, Azerbaijan on 31 May 2023. Flyweights were limited to a maximum of 49 kilograms in body mass.

== Results ==
Legend

- P — Won by punitive declaration
- R — Won by referee stop contest

=== Finals ===
Semifinals				Final
Adriana Cerezo (ESP)	3	0
Merve Dinçel (TUR)	3	4		Merve Dinçel (TUR)	0	4	11
Bruna Duvančić (CRO)	4	3	1	Panipak Wongpattanakit (THA)	0	2	4
Panipak Wongpattanakit (THA)	3	12	9

=== Top half ===
==== Section 1 ====
Round of 64
Henrietta Armah (GHA)	8	8	4
Lam Siu Wai (HKG)	0	8	11
Madinabonu Mannopova (UZB)	10	6^{R}
Gerda Meištininkaitė (LTU)	2	0
Shannon Larkin (IRL)	2	0	0
Ikram Dhahri (TUN)	1	4	5^{P}
Guo Qing (CHN)	15	14^{R}
Dalia Al-Rawajfeh (BRN)	2	3
Mahadula Kumari (SRI)	0	0
Indra Bodén (SWE)	12	13
Sharon Wakoli (KEN)	0	3
María Sara Grippoli (URU)	9	11

Round of 32
Adriana Cerezo (ESP)	11	13
Lam Siu Wai (HKG)	2	0
Madinabonu Mannopova (UZB)	8	3
Ikram Dhahri (TUN)	1	0
Guo Qing (CHN)	3	13
Indra Bodén (SWE)	1	5
María Sara Grippoli (URU)	3	4
Kang Bo-ra (KOR)	5	7

Round of 16
Adriana Cerezo (ESP)	5	6
Madinabonu Mannopova (UZB)	0	3
Guo Qing (CHN)	5	1
Kang Bo-ra (KOR)	2	0

Quarterfinals
Adriana Cerezo (ESP)	7	2	5
Guo Qing (CHN)	4	7	4

==== Section 2 ====
Round of 64
Victoria Stambaugh (PUR)	0	5
Elizaveta Ryadninskaya (AIN)	11	12
Dunya Abutaleb (KSA)	3	11
Francisca Gallardo (CHI)	0	5
Ada Avdagić (BIH)	10	5
Ela Aydin (GER)	14	6^{P}
Viviane Tranquille (CAN)	6	10
Uladzislava Sarokina (AIN)	3	7
Mihaela Bajan (ROU)	2	0
Botakoz Kapanova (KAZ)	12	7
China Murakami (JPN)	3	4
Jenna Ylönen (FIN)	0	0

Round of 32
Merve Dinçel (TUR)	7	18
Elizaveta Ryadninskaya (AIN)	1	6
Dunya Abutaleb (KSA)	0	8	6
Ela Aydin (GER)	1	3	1
Viviane Tranquille (CAN)	8	3
Botakoz Kapanova (KAZ)	9	12
China Murakami (JPN)	0	10	1
Patimat Abakarova (AZE)	5	8	4

Round of 16
Merve Dinçel (TUR)	7	5
Dunya Abutaleb (KSA)	0	1
Botakoz Kapanova (KAZ)	8	5
Patimat Abakarova (AZE)	7	1

Quarterfinals
Merve Dinçel (TUR)	7	3
Botakoz Kapanova (KAZ)	3	2

=== Bottom half ===
==== Section 3 ====
Round of 64
Aleksandra Georgieva (BUL)	10	2	9
Naiara Liñán (AND)	4	4	4
Jhuang Tien-yu (TPE)	3	8
Kylie Lewis (USA)	1	2
Nadia Omar (SOM)	1	0
Trương Thị Kim Tuyền (VIE)	13	13
Maddison Moore (GBR)	7	4
Charikleia Sargantani (GRE)	2	0
Nikola Krajewska (POL)	3	2
Vanja Stanković (SRB)	13	4
Jade Castillo (DEN)	8	13
Antriana Hadjicosti (CYP)	2	0

Round of 32
Daniela Souza (MEX)	4	11	2
Aleksandra Georgieva (BUL)	10	4	1
Jhuang Tien-yu (TPE)	0	5
Trương Thị Kim Tuyền (VIE)	8	6
Maddison Moore (GBR)	4	0
Vanja Stanković (SRB)	6	4
Jade Castillo (DEN)	1	8
Bruna Duvančić (CRO)	11	12

Round of 16
Daniela Souza (MEX)	3	5
Trương Thị Kim Tuyền (VIE)	7	6
Vanja Stanković (SRB)	0	5
Bruna Duvančić (CRO)	12	12

Quarterfinals
Trương Thị Kim Tuyền (VIE)	11	0
Bruna Duvančić (CRO)	16	12

==== Section 4 ====
Round of 64
Jana Khattab (EGY)	2	4	9
Ghazal Soltani (IRI)	6	1	3
Catherine Makanjuola (NGR)	3	9	9
Deeksha Sharma (IND)	3	13	9
Luna Gallo (COL)	1	2
Camila Bezerra (BRA)	4	3
Saffron Tambyrajah (AUS)	13	14
Kajal Shrestha (NEP)	4	0
Ceili Peterson (GUY)	3	4
Martina Corelli (ITA)	10	12
Anna El-Haddad (LBN)	0	9	3^{R}
Matilde Ferreira (POR)	2	1	0

Round of 32
Avishag Semberg (ISR)	0	16	4
Jana Khattab (EGY)	4	4	5
Deeksha Sharma (IND)	1	2
Camila Bezerra (BRA)	2	2
Saffron Tambyrajah (AUS)	5	10
Martina Corelli (ITA)	2	2
Anna El-Haddad (LBN)	0	0
Panipak Wongpattanakit (THA)	12	7

Round of 16
Jana Khattab (EGY)	2	2	10
Camila Bezerra (BRA)	0	2	2
Saffron Tambyrajah (AUS)	6	3
Panipak Wongpattanakit (THA)	18	11

Quarterfinals
Jana Khattab (EGY)	2	2
Panipak Wongpattanakit (THA)	5	10
