= Lingxiao Rock =

Cave in Yangjiang, Guangdong, China

- Lingxiao Cave
- Interactive map of Lingxiao Rock
- Location: Helang Town, Yangchun, Yangjiang
- Coordinates: 22.5950°N 111.8271°E

The Lingxiao Rock (Chinese: 凌霄岩), or Lingxiaoyan, also known as Lingxiao Cave, is a karst cave located in Helang Town, Yangchun, Yangjiang. Characterized by the karst topography, it is about 60 meters high and 30 meters wide.

The stalactites in the cave are all naturally formed without any artificial carvings; therefore, it is touted as the "First Cave in the South China". In 2003, Lingxiao Cave was assessed as a National Geological Park in China.
