= Supharada Ateşli =

German taekwondoin (born 2002)

Supharada Anya Ateşli
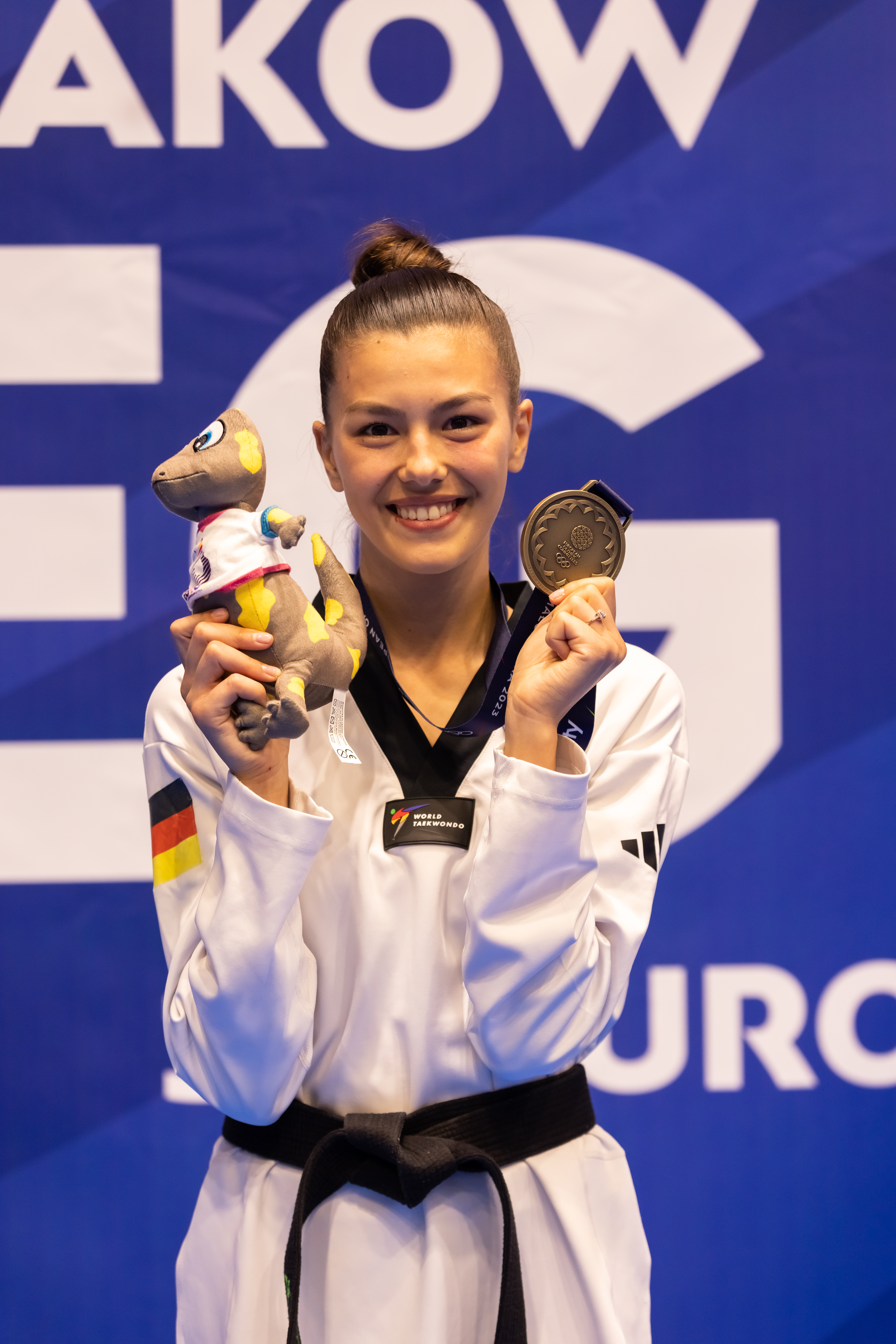
- Supharada Ateşli at the European Games 2023

Personal information
- Nickname: Anya
- Nationality: German
- Born: 27 February 2002 (age 24) Nakhon Si Thammarat, Thailand
- Education: Ansbach University of Applied Sciences
- Height: 1.64 m (5 ft 5 in)

Sport
- Country: Germany
- Sport: Taekwondo
- Event: –49 kg
- Club: Taekwondo Elite Nürnberg
- Coached by: Marco Scheiterbauer; Balazs Toth; Vassili Papakostas

Achievements and titles
- World finals: 2nd place, silver medalist(s)
- Regional finals: 2nd place, silver medalist(s)
- Highest world ranking: 2 (2025)
Medal record
Women's taekwondo
Representing Germany
Senior
World University Games
Silver medal – second place	2025 Rhine-Ruhr	49 kg
Bronze medal – third place	2023 Chengdu	49 kg
Bronze medal – third place	2025 Rhine-Ruhr	Mixed team
European Games
Bronze medal – third place	2023 Kraków-Małopolska	49 kg
European Championships
Bronze medal – third place	2024 Belgrade	49 kg
WT President's Cup
Bronze medal – third place	2026 Nuremberg	49 kg
Junior
World Cadets Championships
Bronze medal – third place	2015 Muju	37 kg
European Under 21 Championships
Silver medal – second place	2022 Tirana	49 kg
European Junior Championships
Bronze medal – third place	2019 Marina d´Or	49 kg
- Updated on 04 June 2026

Supharada "Anya" Ateşli (born 27 February 2002, née Kisskalt) is a German taekwondo athlete.

== Career history ==
=== Junior ===
After winning several medals at open tournaments since 2014, Ateşli took part in the European Junior Championships for the first time in 2015. That same year, she won a bronze medal in the 37 kg weight category at the World Cadet's Championships in Muju.

In 2016 and 2017, further participations at European championships followed. In 2018, she competed at the qualifying tournament for the 2018 Youth Olympic Games. Ateşli won a bronze medal the European Championships in the 49 kg weight class.

=== Senior ===
In 2022, Ateşli competed for the first time in the senior division at the European Championships in Manchester and at the Grand Prix in Paris. She also participated in the 2022 World Taekwondo Championships in Guadalajara, Mexico. Later that year, Ateşli won a silver medal at the European Under 21 Championships in Tirana.

Ateşli participated in the 2023 World Championships in Baku, where she lost to Chaima Touimi from Tunisia in the opening round of the 53 kg category. In June 2023, Ateşli won a bronze medal in the 49 kg weight category at the third European Games, held in Kraków.

At the World University Games held in Chengdu in July and August 2023, she won a bronze medal in the women's 49 kg category, losing to Merve Dinçel in the semi final.

At the 2024 European Championships in Belgrade, Ateşli won the quarter-finals against the Serbian athlete Milica Milić, lost to Adriana Cerezo in the semi-finals and thus won a bronze medal in the 49 kg competition. Ateşli reached 5th place in the women's 49 kg competition at the 2025 World Championships in Wuxi.

== Personal life ==
Anya Ateşli trains with the national team at their base in Langwasser. She graduated from high school in 2021 and has since been studying a management degree programme at Ansbach University of Applied Sciences.
