= Dabba =

Dabba may refer to:

- Dabba or tiffin carrier, a lunch box used in South Asia
- The Lunchbox, working title Dabba, a 2013 Indian film
- Dabba (company), a South African telco company
- ∂, a mathematical symbol
- Beast of the Earth, or Dabbat al-Ardḍ, an apocalyptic creature in Islam

== See also ==
- Dhaba, the name for a roadside restaurant in South Asia
- Daba (disambiguation)
- Dabbas (disambiguation)
- Yabba Dabba Doo (disambiguation)
