= 2025 World Taekwondo Championships – Women's bantamweight =

Taekwondo competitions

Women's bantamweight at the 2025 World Championships
- Venue: Taihu International Expo Center
- Dates: 30 October 2025
- Competitors: 48 from 47 nations

Medalists
gold medal	Merve Dinçel	Turkey
silver medal	Dunya Abutaleb	Saudi Arabia
bronze medal	Zhang Chuling	China
bronze medal	Jana Khattab	Egypt

The Women's bantamweight competition at the 2025 World Taekwondo Championships was held on 30 October 2025 in Wuxi, China. Bantamweights were limited to a maximum of 53 kilograms in body mass.

== Results ==
=== Finals ===
Semifinals			Final
Dunya Abutaleb (KSA)	2	3
Zhang Chuling (CHN)	1	0	Dunya Abutaleb (KSA)	2	0
Merve Dinçel (TUR)	6	4	Merve Dinçel (TUR)	6	2
Jana Khattab (EGY)	2	2

=== Top half ===
==== Section 1 ====
Round of 64
Amna Moghal (NOR)	7	4	0
Zeinab Hamadataher (NIG)	5	6	12
Adiba Asimi (GER)	7	5
Norumar Firdaus (MAS)	4	3
Jessica Canabal (PHI)	13	14
Nichelle Tan (SGP)	3	9
Reyna Herbertson (AUS)	4	5
Shrutika Takale (IND)	9	6

Round of 32
Dunya Abutaleb (KSA)	2	8
Zeinab Hamadataher (NIG)	1	4
Adiba Asimi (GER)	0	1
Ouhoud Ben Aoun (TUN)	3	6
Lea Špehar (CRO)	4	9
Jessica Canabal (PHI)	8	16
Shrutika Takale (IND)	14	6
Laila Khan (CAN)	18	8

Round of 16
Dunya Abutaleb (KSA)	4	3
Ouhoud Ben Aoun (TUN)	1	3
Jessica Canabal (PHI)	8	6	0
Laila Khan (CAN)	10	3	0

Quarterfinals
Dunya Abutaleb (KSA)	9	9
Laila Khan (CAN)	7	4

==== Section 2 ====
Round of 64
Filipa Bastos (POR)	0	0	2
Mariam Sangare (MLI)	0	7	2
Nadia Ferreira (MEX)	1	0
Amina Dehhaoui (MAR)	3	6
Emily Loutsiou (CYP)	0	6	9
Laylo Zayniddinova (UZB)	14	5	17
Eunice Adedapo (GHA)	3	0
Anna Frassica (ITA)	8	8

Round of 32
Andrea Bokan (SRB)	8	6
Filipa Bastos (POR)	2	0
Amina Dehhaoui (MAR)	6	13
Yuzuho Kato (JPN)	0	0
Nivea Barros (BRA)	3	3
Laylo Zayniddinova (UZB)	9	4
Anna Frassica (ITA)	0	2	13
Zhang Chuling (CHN)	4	0	15

Round of 16
Andrea Bokan (SRB)	5	1
Amina Dehhaoui (MAR)	10	6
Laylo Zayniddinova (UZB)	3	0
Zhang Chuling (CHN)	5	0

Quarterfinals
Amina Dehhaoui (MAR)	0	1	3
Zhang Chuling (CHN)	2	0	6

=== Bottom half ===
==== Section 3 ====
Round of 64
Alesia Patratii (KGZ)	0	1
Park Hye-jin (KOR)	7	3
Ariel Vigdor (ISR)	6	1
Ana Crisóstomo (PER)	2	0
Nahomy Víctor (DOM)	5	5
Mariella Bou Habib (LBN)	5	5
Łucja Oleszczuk (POL)	0	4
Ioanna Desylla (GRE)	5	9

Round of 32
Alma Pérez (ESP)	3	4	7
Park Hye-jin (KOR)	1	6	2
Ariel Vigdor (ISR)	4	0	0
Su Po-ya (TPE)	0	3	10
Mobina Nematzadeh (IRI)	8	7
Mariella Bou Habib (LBN)	0	0
Ioanna Desylla (GRE)	0	3
Merve Dinçel (TUR)	4	5

Round of 16
Alma Pérez (ESP)	2	3	0
Su Po-ya (TPE)	9	2	0
Mobina Nematzadeh (IRI)	3	1
Merve Dinçel (TUR)	4	2

Quarterfinals
Su Po-ya (TPE)	0	8	0
Merve Dinçel (TUR)	0	3	6

==== Section 4 ====
Round of 64
Esther Oyibiga (GAB)	2	0
Jodie Mckew (GBR)	6	12
Nguyễn Thị Loan (VIE)	9	7
Angie Prieto (COL)	1	6
Fathimath Ibrahim (MDV)	0	0
Anastasia Subbotina (AIN)	12	13
Jayda Vo (USA)	2	3
Megawati Maheswari (INA)	10	4

Round of 32
Ada Avdagić (BIH)	0	3
Jodie Mckew (GBR)	7	8
Nguyễn Thị Loan (VIE)	1	2
Chutikan Jongkolrattanawattana (THA)	6	9
Aziza Karajanova (KAZ)	7	2	5
Anastasia Subbotina (AIN)	5	6	6
Megawati Maheswari (INA)	4	6	4
Jana Khattab (EGY)	2	11	11

Round of 16
Jodie Mckew (GBR)	4	17	2
Chutikan Jongkolrattanawattana (THA)	5	9	6
Anastasia Subbotina (AIN)	7	1	1
Jana Khattab (EGY)	5	6	3

Quarterfinals
Chutikan Jongkolrattanawattana (THA)	0	1
Jana Khattab (EGY)	1	4
