= Jiangcheng =

Jiāngchéng (江城) may refer to the following locations in China:

- Jiangcheng Hani and Yi Autonomous County, Pu'er Prefecture, Yunnan
- Jiangcheng District, Yangjiang, Guangdong
- Jiangcheng, Tiandong County, Guangxi
- Jiangcheng, Jiangchuan County, in Jiangchuan County, Yunnan
- Jiangcheng Township, Xinshi District, Baoding, Hebei

== See also ==
- Wuhan Jiangcheng F.C., a Chinese football club based in Wuhan, Hubei
