= Dabbas =

Dabbas may refer to:

- Dabbas (surname)
- the plural of dabba, which is another name for a tiffin carrier

== See also ==
- Dabba (disambiguation)
- Dabas (disambiguation)
