= Daba, Yangjiang =

Town in Guangdong, China

Daba 大八镇
- Town
- Location in Guangdong
- Coordinates: 22°4′11″N 111°57′32″E
- Country: People's Republic of China
- Province: Guangdong
- Prefecture-level city: Yangjiang
- District: Yangdong District
- Time zone: UTC+8 (China Standard)

Daba (Chinese: 大八; pinyin: Dàbā) is a town under the administration of Yangdong District, Yangjiang, Guangdong, China. As of 2020, it administers Daba Residential Neighborhood and the following 21 villages:

- Daba Village
- Jishui Village (吉水村)
- Gucheng Village (古城村)
- Liang'ai Village (良爱村)
- Longxin Village (龙心村)
- Baimeng Village (白蒙村)
- Niuling Village (牛岭村)
- Xindong Village (新垌村)
- Dapi Village (大陂村)
- Hedong Village (河垌村)
- Maotang Village (茅塘村)
- Leigang Village (雷冈村)
- Dagangtang Village (大岗塘村)
- Zhouheng Village (周亨村)
- Jinggang Village (井冈村)
- Shalang Village (沙朗村)
- Zhuhuan Village (珠环村)
- Taidong Village (太洞村)
- Luotian Village (罗田村)
- Zoumaping Village (走马坪村)
- Changping Village (长坪村)
