= Gerhard Hancke =

South African electrical engineer

Gerhard P. Hancke
- Education: Stellenbosch University
- Alma mater: University of Pretoria
- Scientific career
- Fields: Electrical Engineering
- Website: Gerhard Hancke at IEEE; Prof Hancke at UP; G.P. Hancke on LinkedIn

Gerhard P. Hancke from the University of Pretoria, South Africa was named Fellow of the Institute of Electrical and Electronics Engineers (IEEE) in 2016 for contributions to wireless sensor networks.

== Education and career ==
Hancke received a BEng and MEng from Stellenbosch University and DEng from the University of Pretoria in 1983. He is Chair of the Computer Engineering Program at the University of Pretoria and is responsible for undergraduate, graduate and research activities. He is head of a joint initiative between the University of Pretoria and the Council for Scientific and Industrial Research (CSIR), called the Research Group for Distributed Sensor Networks.

Within the Institute of Electrical and Electronics Engineers (IEEE) he has served as Secretary, Treasurer, Section Chair, Student Activities Chair and Student Branch Counselor. He was elected to the Administrative committee of the IEEE Industrial Electronics Society in 1999 and served as Senior AdCom Member and Secretary from 2006.

In 2005 he founded the Advanced Sensor Networks Research Group at the University of Pretoria and was head of the group until mid-2017.He co-edited a textbook on Industrial Wireless Sensor Networks: Applications, Protocols and Standards, published in April 2013, the first on the topic.

He has published more than 190 articles and been cited more than 8000 times.

Hancke received the THRIP Technology Award from the South African Department of Trade and Industry in 2007 (for SMME Development) and 2011 (Advanced Hi-Tech category).

== Research Projects ==
Hancke has collaborated with industry on projects related to wireless sensor network and communication. Examples of these projects are:

- Electrical Utility: In collaboration with Eskom and international partners to assist with safety of staff; monitoring performance of transmission and distribution lines; and energy harvesting from HV lines.
- Underground mine safety: In collaboration with local and international partners with sponsorship from the Norwegian Ministry of Foreign Affairs studies on the deployment of gas sensors and communication in underground mines in South Africa; and underground real-time location, ventilation, and air conditioning using wireless sensing and communication.
- Smart networks: In collaboration with the Meraka Institute to research, amongst others, Software Defined Wireless Sensor Networks, 5G for Internet of things (IoT), and Smart Water Management Systems.

== See also ==
- Wireless Africa programme of the Meraka Institute
