= Longgong Rock =

Cave

- Dragon Palace Cave
- Location: Chunwan Town, Yangchun City

The Longgong Rock (simplified Chinese: 龙宫岩; traditional Chinese: 龍宮岩), or Longgongyan, also known as Dragon Palace Cave, is a promenade-style cave located 2 km east of Chunwan Town, Yangchun City. It was discovered in 1978 and is about 1000 meters long. It is named "Longgong Rock" because the Cave's body is winding and twisting like a giant dragon.

According to the scenery formed in the Cave, the Longgong Rock is divided into four sections: Yingbin Corridor, Dragon King Palace, Treasure House, and Longmu Pavilion.
