= Zhang Chuling =

Chinese taekwondo practitioner)

Personal information
- Nationality: Chinese
- Born: 31 August 2005 (age 21)

Sport
- Sport: Taekwondo
- Weight class: 53 kg
Medal record
Representing China
Women's taekwondo
World Championships
Bronze medal – third place	2025 Wuxi	53 kg
Asian Games
Silver medal – second place	2026 Aichi-Nagoya	57 kg

Zhang Chuling (born 31 August 2005) is a Chinese taekwondo practitioner. She won a bronze medal at the 2025 World Taekwondo Championships.

== Career ==
In December 2024, Zhang competed at the 2024 World Taekwondo Grand Slam Challenge and won a silver medal in the 57 kg category. She competed at the 2025 World Taekwondo Championships and won a bronze medal in the 53 kg category, losing to Dunya Abutaleb in the semifinals.
