= Xinxi =

Xinxi may refer to:

== Populated places ==
- Xinxi, Yushui (新溪乡), a township in Yushui District, Xinyu, Jiangxi
- Xinxi, Longhu (新溪镇), a town in Longhu District, Shantou, Guangdong
- Xinxi County (新息縣), an administrative division of the ancient Runan Commandery (present-day Henan and Anhui provinces)
- Xinxi Village (新锡村), Daba, Puning, Guangdong
- Xinxi Village (新溪村), Suoshi, Shuangfeng, Hunan
- Xinxi Village (新溪村), Yanglin, Shaoshan, Hunan
- Xinxi Village (新西里), Anle District, Keelung, Taiwan
- Xinxi Village (新西里), West District, Chiayi, Taiwan

== Other ==
- Xinxi (心溪), a minor character in the wuxia novel The Deer and the Cauldron by Jin Yong
