= Taekwondo at the 2022 Asian Games – Women's 49 kg =

Taekwondo competition

Women's 49 kg at the 2022 Asian Games
- Venue: Lin'an Sports and Culture Centre
- Date: 25 September 2023
- Competitors: 22 from 22 nations

Medalists
gold medal	Panipak Wongpattanakit	Thailand
silver medal	Guo Qing	China
bronze medal	Madinabonu Mannopova	Uzbekistan
bronze medal	Mobina Nematzadeh	Iran

The women's 49 kilograms event at the 2022 Asian Games took place on 25 September 2023 at Lin'an Sports and Culture Centre, Hangzhou, China.

== Schedule ==
All times are China Standard Time (UTC+08:00)

Date	Time	Event
Monday, 25 September 2023	09:00	Round of 32
Monday, 25 September 2023	09:00	Round of 16
Monday, 25 September 2023	14:00	Quarterfinals
Monday, 25 September 2023	14:00	Semifinals
Monday, 25 September 2023	14:00	Gold medal contest

== Results ==
Legend

- DQ — Won by disqualification
- P — Won by punitive declaration

=== Final ===
Gold medal contest
Panipak Wongpattanakit (THA)	7	1	12
Guo Qing (CHN)	6	2	9

=== Top half ===
Round of 32
Kry Lyden (CAM)	7	4
Anjali Tamang (NEP)	7	10
Kong Chi Lam (MAC)	D	Q
Mahadula Kumari (SRI)
Ana Belo (TLS)	6	9
Kaltham Al-Mutawah (QAT)	2	4

Round of 16
Panipak Wongpattanakit (THA)	12	10
Anjali Tamang (NEP)	0	0
Lam Siu Wai (HKG)	0	2
Jhuang Tien-yu (TPE)	12	14
Madinabonu Mannopova (UZB)	12	16
Kong Chi Lam (MAC)	0	4
Ana Belo (TLS)	10	0	3
Trương Thị Kim Tuyền (VIE)	7	7	7

Quarterfinals
Panipak Wongpattanakit (THA)	6	11
Jhuang Tien-yu (TPE)	1	7
Madinabonu Mannopova (UZB)	13	15
Trương Thị Kim Tuyền (VIE)	9	13

Semifinals
Panipak Wongpattanakit (THA)	2	8
Madinabonu Mannopova (UZB)	1	7

=== Bottom half ===
Round of 32
Veronica Garces (PHI)	4	2
Shirinmohi Mirshakarzoda (TJK)	0	0
Ruka Okamoto (JPN)	9	5
Maiar Qabaha (PLE)	3	2
Bat-Erdeniin Uchral (MGL)	0	1
Ni Kadek Heni Prikasih (INA)	12	13

Round of 16
Mobina Nematzadeh (IRI)	9	14
Veronica Garces (PHI)	5	2
Ruka Okamoto (JPN)	2	0
Botakoz Kapanova (KAZ)	5	12
Dunya Abutaleb (KSA)	7	12
Kang Mi-reu (KOR)	5	6
Ni Kadek Heni Prikasih (INA)	0	5
Guo Qing (CHN)	0	13

Quarterfinals
Mobina Nematzadeh (IRI)	13	20
Botakoz Kapanova (KAZ)	4	8
Dunya Abutaleb (KSA)	7	5
Guo Qing (CHN)	13	13

Semifinals
Mobina Nematzadeh (IRI)	10	8
Guo Qing (CHN)	14	25^{P}
