= Dabas =

Dabas may refer to:

- Dabas, Hungary, a town in Pest county, Hungary
  - Dabas–Gyón FC, an association football club
  - FC Dabas, an association football club
- Dabas (clan), a Jat gotra of India
- Dabas (surname), a surname of India (including a list of persons with the name)
- Richard Dabas, a Dominican footballer

== See also ==
- Hamed Abu Daabas, Israeli Bedouin leader
- Dabbas (disambiguation)
- Daba (disambiguation)
- Daba Mountains, a mountain range in Central China
