= Taekwondo at the 2024 Summer Olympics – Women's 49 kg =

Women's 49 kg at the Games of the XXXIII Olympiad
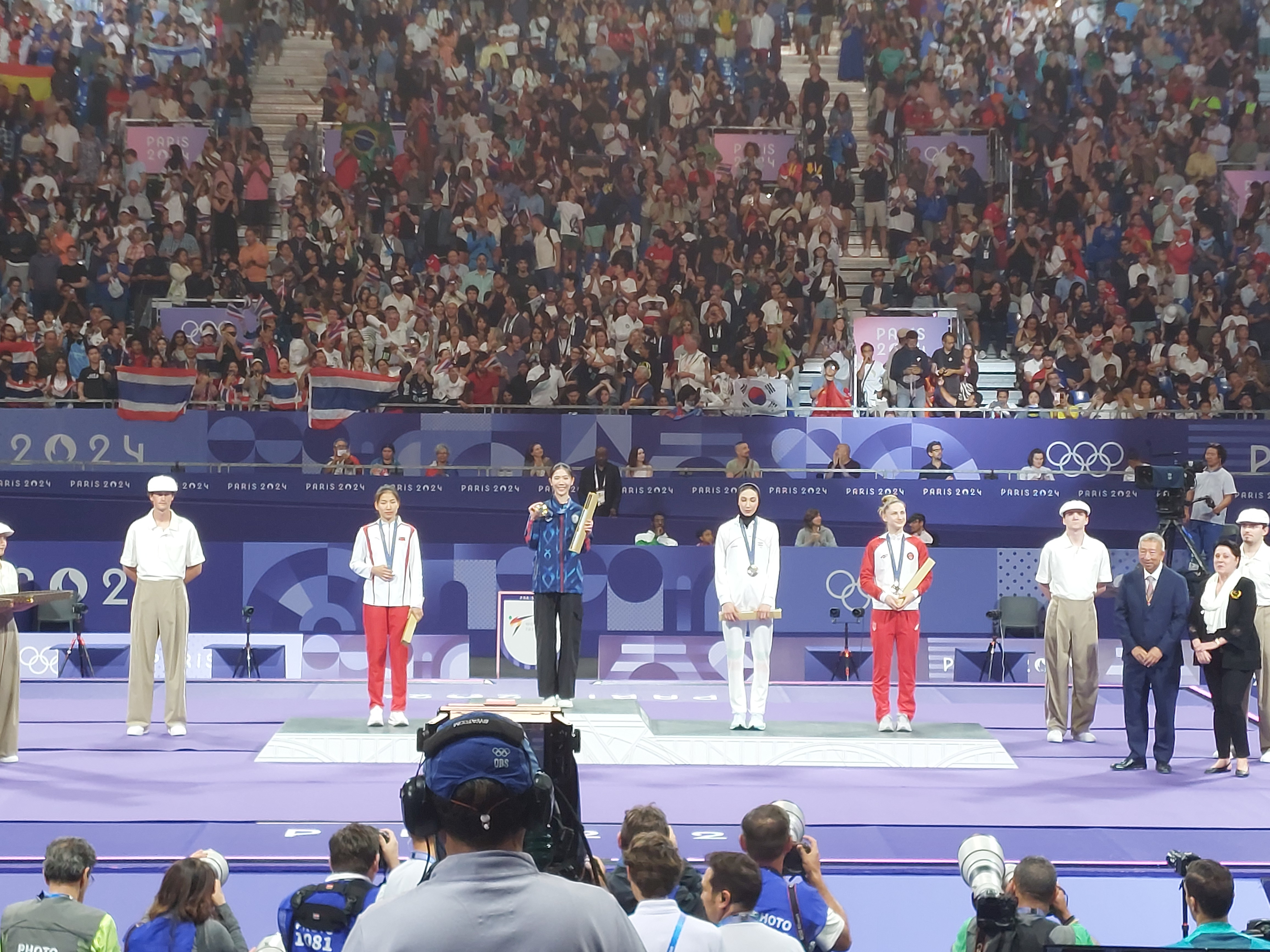
- From left to right; Qing, Wongpattanakit, Nematzadeh, and Stojković on the podium
- Venue: Grand Palais
- Date: 7 August 2024
- Competitors: 17 from 17 nations

Medalists
1st place, gold medalist(s)		Panipak Wongpattanakit	Thailand
2nd place, silver medalist(s)		Guo Qing	China
3rd place, bronze medalist(s)		Mobina Nematzadeh	Iran
3rd place, bronze medalist(s)		Lena Stojković	Croatia

The women's 49 kg competition in Taekwondo at the 2024 Summer Olympics was held on 7 August 2024 at the Grand Palais.

== Summary ==
This is the seventh appearance of the women's 49kg event,

Panipak Wongpattanakit defended her Olympic title and became the eventual champion for the second time, Adriana Cerezo won by beating María Sara Grippoli 4-18, and lost to Mobina Nematzadeh 2-9, one of the bronze medalists, Avishag Semberg lost to Dunya Abutaleb 17-10, and Tijana Bogdanović failed to qualify.

== Seeds ==
Every practitioner has their number seeded.

- Panipak Wongpattanakit (THA) (Champion)
- Adriana Cerezo (ESP) (quarterfinals)
- Merve Dinçel (TUR) (loser of bronze medals)
- Lena Stojković (CRO) (Bronze medalist)
- Daniela Souza (MEX) (round of 16)
- Guo Qing (CHN) (Final)
- Mobina Nematzadeh (IRI) (Bronze medalist)
- Avishag Semberg (ISR) (round of 16)
- Dunya Abutaleb (KSA) (loser of bronze medals)
- Michelle Tau (LES) (Round of 16)
- Dina Pouryounes (EOR) (loser of repechages)
- Ikram Dhahri (TUN) (quarterfinals)
- Josipa Kafadar (CAN) (round of 16)
- Ilenia Elisabetta Matonti (ITA) (round of 16)
- María Sara Grippoli (URU) (round of 16)
- Ana Belo (TLS) (qualification)
- Oumaima El-Bouchti (MAR) (loser of repechages)

== Results ==
=== Gold medal match ===
Gold medal match
1	Panipak Wongpattanakit (THA)	6	2	6
6	Guo Qing (CHN)	3	3	2

=== Repechage ===
Repechage				Bronze Medal
				7	Mobina Nematzadeh (IRI)	3	4
				9	Dunya Abutaleb (KSA)	0	2
9	Dunya Abutaleb (KSA)	2	7	9	Dunya Abutaleb (KSA)	0	2
	Oumaima El-Bouchti (MAR)	0	0

Repechage				Bronze Medal
11	Dina Pouryounes (EOR)	4	1
3	Merve Dinçel (TUR)	13	13
3	Merve Dinçel (TUR)	13	13	3	Merve Dinçel (TUR)	0	3
				4	Lena Stojković (CRO)	1	5

=== Main bracket ===
==== Pool A ====
Qualification round
16	Ana Belo (TLS)	1	1
Oumaima El-Bouchti (MAR)	2	4

Round of 16
13	Josipa Kafadar (CAN)	0	5
4	Lena Stojković (CRO)	0	6
5	Daniela Souza (MEX)	0	6	5
12	Ikram Dhahri (TUN)	0	3	5
9	Dunya Abutaleb (KSA)	2	5	10
8	Avishag Semberg (ISR)	6	4	0
1	Panipak Wongpattanakit (THA)	8	10
Oumaima El-Bouchti (MAR)	1	1

Quarter-finals
4	Lena Stojković (CRO)	3	7	4
12	Ikram Dhahri (TUN)	3	3	1
9	Dunya Abutaleb (KSA)	1	3
1	Panipak Wongpattanakit (THA)	4	13

Semi-finals
4	Lena Stojković (CRO)	0	5
1	Panipak Wongpattanakit (THA)	8	11

==== Pool B ====
Qualification round

Round of 16
15	María Sara Grippoli (URU)	4	0
2	Adriana Cerezo (ESP)	11	7
7	Mobina Nematzadeh (IRI)	3	2
10	Michelle Tau (LES)	0	0
11	Dina Pouryounes (EOR)	4	0
6	Guo Qing (CHN)	5	12
3	Merve Dinçel (TUR)	5	3
14	Ilenia Elisabetta Matonti (ITA)	1	1

Quarter-finals
2	Adriana Cerezo (ESP)	0	2
7	Mobina Nematzadeh (IRI)	2	7
6	Guo Qing (CHN)	6	3
3	Merve Dinçel (TUR)	1	2

Semi-finals
7	Mobina Nematzadeh (IRI)	1	2
6	Guo Qing (CHN)	4	6
