= Yangdong =

Yangdong may refer to:

- Yangdong District, in Guangdong, China
- Yangdong Folk Village, in Gangdong-myeon, South Korea
