= Yongning, Yangchun =

Yongning 永宁镇
- Town
- Location in Guangdong
- Coordinates: 22°15′18″N 111°36′33″E
- Country: People's Republic of China
- Province: Guangdong
- Prefecture-level city: Yangjiang
- County-level city: Yangchun
- Elevation: 180 m (590 ft)
- Time zone: UTC+8 (China Standard)
- Area code: 0662

Yongning (simplified Chinese: 永宁; traditional Chinese: 永寧; pinyin: Yǒngníng; Jyutping: wing^{5}ning^{4}) is a town in western Guangdong province, China, under the administration of the county-level city of Yangchun. As of 2018, it has one residential community and 24 villages under its administration.
