= Taekwondo at the 2022 Mediterranean Games – Women's 49 kg =

Taekwondo competition

Taekwondo – Women's 49 kg at the 2022 Mediterranean Games
- Venue: Mohammed Ben Ahmed Convention Centre
- Date: 3 July
- Competitors: 11 from 11 nations

Medalists
gold medal	Merve Dinçel	Turkey
silver medal	Adriana Cerezo	Spain
bronze medal	Bruna Duvančić	Croatia
bronze medal	Shahd El-Hosseiny	Egypt

The women's 49 kg competition in taekwondo at the 2022 Mediterranean Games was held on 3 July at the Mohammed ben Ahmed CCO in Oran.

== Results ==
Legend

- PTG — Won by Points Gap
- SUP — Won by superiority
- OT — Won on over time (Golden Point)
- DQ — Won by disqualification
- PUN — Won by punitive declaration
- WD — Won by withdrawal

Round of 16
Jelena Peruničić (MNE)	3
Nezha Elaasal (MAR)	25^{PTG}
Džejla Makaš (BIH)	2
Ikram Dhahri (TUN)	16
Vanja Stanković (SRB)	32
Nada Baatouche (ALG)	15

Quarterfinals
Adriana Cerezo (ESP)	26^{PTG}
Nezha Elaasal (MAR)	4
Shahd El-Hosseiny (EGY)	12
Kyriaki Kouttouki (CYP)	3
Bruna Duvančić (CRO)	11
Ikram Dhahri (TUN)	9
Vanja Stanković (SRB)	3
Merve Dinçel (TUR)	16

Semifinals
Adriana Cerezo (ESP)	5
Shahd El-Hosseiny (EGY)	1
Bruna Duvančić (CRO)	5
Merve Dinçel (TUR)	7

Final
Adriana Cerezo (ESP)	1
Merve Dinçel (TUR)	7
