= Yabba Dabba Doo =

Yabba Dabba Doo is the catchphrase of Fred Flintstone.

Yabba Dabba Doo may also refer to:

- Yabba Dabba Doo! The Happy World of Hanna-Barbera, a 1977 American live-action/animated television special
  - The Hanna-Barbera Hall of Fame: Yabba Dabba Doo II, a 1979 sequel
  - Hanna-Barbera's 50th: A Yabba Dabba Doo Celebration, a 1989 sequel
- Yabba Dabba Doo!, 1986 video game based on The Flintstones
- "The King Is Gone (So Are You)", 1989 Novelty song performed by George Jones, originally titled "Ya Ba Da Ba Do (So Are You)"
- I Yabba-Dabba Do!, 1993 animated film based on The Flintstones
- Beabadoobee, a British-Filipino singer who is often humorously called 'Yabadabadoo' due to her stage name being hard to pronounce for some

== See also ==
- Yabba (disambiguation)
- Dabba (disambiguation)
- Doo (disambiguation)
