= Jodie Mckew =

British taekwondo practitioner

Personal information
- Born: 8 September 2004 (age 21)

Sport
- Sport: Taekwondo
Medal record
Women's taekwondo
Representing Great Britain
European Championships
Bronze medal – third place	2026 Munich	53 kg

Jodie Mckew (born 8 September 2004) is a British taekwondo practitioner. She was a bronze medalist at the 2026 European Taekwondo Championships.

== Career ==
From Dollingstown, Northern Ireland, Mckew attended Banbridge High School, and started in Taekwondo in 2012. From 2018, she began training at the British Taekwondo development programme in Manchester. That year, she became British national age-group champion and captained the British female cadet team at the European Championships in Spain. She competed at the 2021 European Championships in Bulgaria.

She represented a Great Britain at the 2025 World Taekwondo Championships in Wuxi, China in October 2025, in the women's bantamweight division.

In May 2026, she was a bronze medalist at the 2026 European Taekwondo Championships in Munich, Germany in the women's -53kg category.
