= Yabby =

Yabby is a name given in Australia to two different kinds of crustacean:

- Cherax (freshwater yabby), a genus of crayfish
  - Common yabby, a species of Cherax
- Trypaea (marine yabby), a ghost shrimp (infraorder Thalassinidea) which lives in the intertidal zone

== See also ==
- Yabba (disambiguation)
- Yabby You (1946–2010), Jamaican reggae vocalist and producer
