= Yabba (disambiguation) =

"Yabba" is the nickname of Stephen Gascoigne (1878–1942), a well-known heckler at the Sydney Cricket Ground.

Yabba may also refer to:

- A shortening of "Yabba-Dabba-Doo!", a phrase from the animated television series The Flintstones
- Yabba, an English word of Australian Aboriginal origin meaning "to talk"
- "The Yabba", an instrumental track by Battles
- The Yabba, short for Bundanyabba, a fictional mining town in the 1971 film Wake in Fright

== See also ==
- Tillandsia Yabba, a hybrid cultivar of the genus Tillandsia in the Bromeliad family
- Ya ba, a Thai drug containing methamphetamine and caffeine
- Yabba Dabba Doo (disambiguation)
- Yabba Falls and Yabba Creek, Queensland, Australia
- Yabba North, a town in Victoria, Australia
- Yabba South, a town in Victoria, Australia
- "Yabba, Yabba, Yabba", a Shining Time Station Season 2 episode
- Yabby (disambiguation)
