= Village Telco =

Village Telco is an initiative to build low-cost community telephone network hardware and software. It is based on a suite of open-source applications that enable entrepreneurs to set up and operate a telephone service in a specific area or supporting the needs of a specific community.

The first Village Telco network was established by Dabba at Orange Farm, a township in the City of Johannesburg Metropolitan Municipality (South Africa). Users can make free local calls to other Dabba subscribers, as well as use pay-as-you-go vouchers to make calls to 'phones on other networks.

Technically, a Village Telco system consists of:

- a mesh network made up of Wi-Fi mini-routers combined with an analogue telephone adaptor (a.k.a. 'Mesh Potato')
- SIP phones
- a pay-as-you-go billing and management system
- a SIP/VOIP server
- least cost routing equipment

These components together comprise an easy-to-use, standards-based, wireless, local, do-it-yourself, telephone company toolkit. The goal of bringing these together is to make local telephony in developing countries to be so cheap as to be virtually free. This has become possible thanks to advances in open source telephony software and the dramatic decrease in the cost of wireless broadband technology.

== See also ==
- Personal Telco Project, which is a wireless community network project running in Portland, Oregon.
- South African wireless community networks: Orange Farm and the Mesh Potato
