= Jana Khattab =

Egyptian taekwondo practitioner)

Personal information
- Nationality: Egyptian

Sport
- Sport: Taekwondo
- Weight class: 53 kg
Medal record
Representing Egypt
Women's taekwondo
World Championships
Bronze medal – third place	2025 Wuxi	53 kg

Jana Khattab is an Egyptian taekwondo practitioner. She won a bronze medal at the 2025 World Taekwondo Championships.

== Career ==
In September 2025, Khattab competed at the German Open and won a gold medal in the 53 kg category. The next month she competed at the 2025 World Taekwondo Championships and won a bronze medal in the 53 kg category, losing to eventual gold medalist Merve Dinçel in the semifinals.
