= Adriana Cerezo =

Spanish taekwondo practitioner

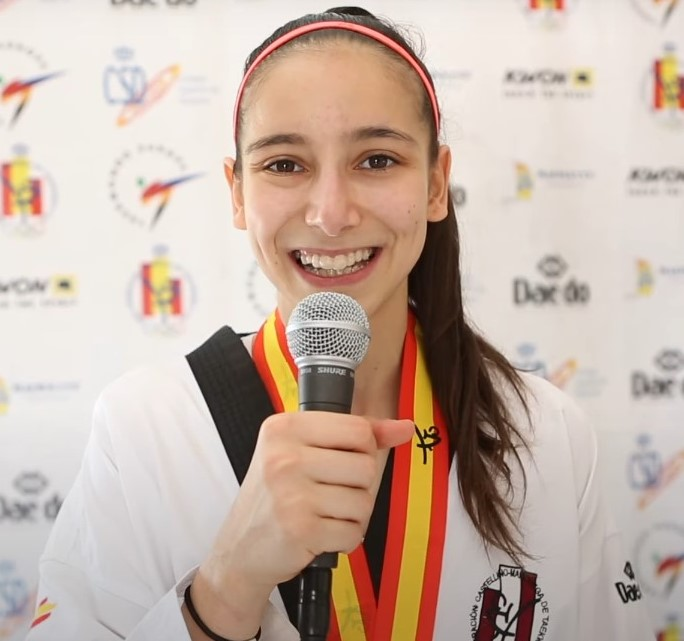
- Cerezo in 2021

Personal information
- Full name: Adriana Cerezo Iglesias
- Born: 24 November 2003 (age 22) Alcalá de Henares, Spain
- Height: 168 cm (5 ft 6 in)
- Weight: 49 kg (108 lb)

Sport
- Sport: Taekwondo
- Event: Flyweight
- Club: Hankuk International School
- Coached by: Jesús Ramal
Medal record
Representing Spain
Olympic Games
Silver medal – second place	2020 Tokyo	49 kg
World Championships
Bronze medal – third place	2023 Baku	−49 kg
European Championships
Gold medal – first place	2021 Sofia	49 kg
Gold medal – first place	2024 Belgrade	49 kg
Bronze medal – third place	2022 Manchester	49 kg
Bronze medal – third place	2026 Munich	49 kg
European Games
Gold medal – first place	2023 Kraków-Małopolska	49 kg
Grand Prix
Gold medal – first place	2022 Rome	49 kg
Silver medal – second place	2023 Rome	49 kg
Silver medal – second place	2023 Paris	49 kg
Silver medal – second place	2023 Manchester (F)	49 kg
Bronze medal – third place	2022 Manchester	49 kg
Bronze medal – third place	2022 Riyadh (F)	49 kg
Mediterranean Games
Silver medal – second place	2022 Oran	49 kg
European U21 Championships
Gold medal – first place	2019 Helsingborg	49 kg
Gold medal – first place	2022 Tirana	49 kg
European Junior Championships
Gold medal – first place	2019 Marina D'Or	49 kg
- Updated on 14 May 2026

Adriana Cerezo Iglesias (Note: In this Spanish name, the first or paternal surname is Cerezo and the second or maternal family name is Iglesias.) (born 24 November 2003 in Alcalá de Henares) is a Spanish taekwondo athlete. A two-time Olympian, she won the silver medal in the 2020 Summer Olympics in Tokyo.

== Career ==
In 2021, Cerezo won the gold medal in her debut at the European Taekwondo Championships, at only 17 years old. A month later, she qualified through the 2021 European Taekwondo Olympic Qualification Tournament for the 2020 Summer Olympics in Tokyo.

In the Women's 49 kg event in Tokyo, Cerezo defeated two-time Olympic gold medallist Wu Jingyu on her way to the final. In the final itself, Cerezo was leading with seven seconds remaining in the contest, before opponent Panipak Wongpattanakit scored two points, resulting in Panipak winning gold and Cerezo finishing second for the silver medal.

In 2022, Cerezo won a bronze medal at the European Championships held in Manchester in May of that year. In June's Grand Prix in Rome, Cerezo won her first gold in that event, beating Croatia's Bruna Duvančić in the final. Cerezo won the silver medal in the women's 49 kg event at the 2022 Mediterranean Games held in Oran, Algeria in July.

She won one of the bronze medals in the women's flyweight event at the 2023 World Taekwondo Championships held in Baku, Azerbaijan.

In 2024, Cerezo won the gold medal in the women's 49 kg event at the European Taekwondo Championships held in Belgrade, Serbia. She beat Merve Dinçel of Turkey in the final for her second gold medal in the competition after her initial success in 2021. Later in the year, she took part in the Olympics for the second time. Cerezo missed the medals after losing in the quarterfinals to Mobina Nematzadeh.

== See also ==
- List of Olympic medalists in taekwondo
