= Guo Qing =

Chinese taekwondo practitioner (born 2000)

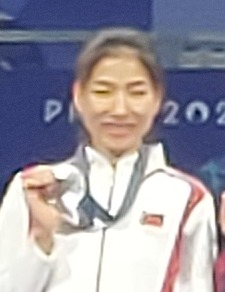
- At the 2024 Summer Olympics

Personal information
- Born: 16 May 2000 (age 26) Yongning, Yangchun, China
- Height: 170 cm (5 ft 7 in)

Sport
- Sport: Taekwondo
Medal record
Representing China
Olympic Games
Silver medal – second place	2024 Paris	49 kg
World Championships
Silver medal – second place	2022 Guadalajara	49 kg
Grand Slam
Bronze medal – third place	2023 Wuxi	49 kg
Grand Prix
Silver medal – second place	2023 Taiyuan	49 kg
Bronze medal – third place	2023 Rome	49 kg
Bronze medal – third place	2022 Manchester	49 kg
Asian Games
Silver medal – second place	2022 Hangzhou	49 kg
Asian Championships
Gold medal – first place	2022 Chuncheon	49 kg
World University Games
Gold medal – first place	2025 Rhine-Ruhr	53 kg
Gold medal – first place	2025 Rhine-Ruhr	Team Kyorugi
Bronze medal – third place	2021 Chengdu	53 kg

Guo Qing (Chinese: 郭清; pinyin: Guō Qīng; born 16 May 2000) is a Chinese taekwondo practitioner. She was a silver medalist at the 2022 World Taekwondo Championships and the 2024 Summer Olympics, and a double gold medalist at the 2025 World University Games.

== Early life ==
Guo came from a poor family in a remote mountainous area of Guangdong Province. With five younger brothers and elderly parents living only on a senior citizen's allowance, she began practicing taekwondo in the hope of improving her and her family's living conditions. All of the winnings she won from early taekwondo competitions were used to renovate their house. Her father said she was truly the breadwinner of the family.

== Career ==
She was a silver medalist in Guadalajara, Mexico, at the 2022 World Taekwondo Championships in the Women's flyweight, losing the final to Panipak Wongpattanakit of Thailand.

She was a bronze medalist at the delayed 2021 Summer World University Games held in August 2023 in Chengdu, China, in the women's 53 kg division. She was a silver medalist at the delayed 2022 Asian Games held in September 2023 in Hangzhou in the −49 kg category.

She won the silver medal at the 2024 Summer Olympics in Paris, France, losing the final to Panipak Wongpattanakit of Thailand.

She won a gold medal in the Team Kyorugi at the 2025 Summer World University Games in Germany alongside Xing Jiani and Mu Wenzhe. She also won an individual gold medal at the Games, defeating Chutikan Jongkolrattanawattana of Thailand in the final of the -53kg division.
