= 2024 European Taekwondo Championships – Women's 49 kg =

Women's 49 kg at the 2024 European Taekwondo Championships
- Venue: Belgrade Fair – Hall 1
- Location: Belgrade, Serbia
- Dates: 9 May
- Competitors: 21 from 21 nations

Medalists
gold medal	Adriana Cerezo	Spain
silver medal	Merve Dinçel	Turkey
bronze medal	Supharada Kisskalt	Germany
bronze medal	Bruna Duvančić	Croatia

The women's 49 kg competition at the 2024 European Taekwondo Championships was held on 9 May 2024.

== Results ==
=== Finals ===
Semifinals
Adriana Cerezo (ESP)	2
Supharada Kisskalt (GER)	0
Bruna Duvančić (CRO)	0
Merve Dinçel (TUR)	2

Final
Adriana Cerezo (ESP)	2
Merve Dinçel (TUR)	1

=== Top half ===
==== Section 1 ====
Round of 32
Irina Rogozina (AIN)	2
Uladzislava Sarokina (AIN)	0

Round of 16
Adriana Cerezo (ESP)	2
Irina Rogozina (AIN)	0
Naiara Liñán (AND)	1
Aleksandra Georgieva (BUL)	2

Quarterfinals
Adriana Cerezo (ESP)	2
Aleksandra Georgieva (BUL)	0

==== Section 2 ====
Round of 32
Ingrid Busuioc (ROU)	2
Matilde Ferreira (POR)	1
Erika Bryhida (UKR)	0
Mah Teninba Fofana (FRA)	2

Round of 16
Supharada Kisskalt (GER)	2
Ingrid Busuioc (ROU)	0
Mah Teninba Fofana (FRA)	1
Milica Milić (SRB)	2

Quarterfinals
Supharada Kisskalt (GER)	2
Milica Milić (SRB)	0

=== Bottom half ===
==== Section 3 ====
Round of 32
Elena Ioannou (CYP)	0
Charikleia Sargantani (GRE)	2

Round of 16
Bruna Duvančić (CRO)	2
Charikleia Sargantani (GRE)	0
Alicja Krajewska (POL)	0
Indra Boden (SWE)	2

Quarterfinals
Bruna Duvančić (CRO)	2
Indra Boden (SWE)	0

==== Section 4 ====
Round of 32
Maryam Mammadova (AZE)
Jodie McKew (GBR)

Round of 16
Martina Corelli (ITA)	0
Jade Castillo (DEN)	2
Jodie McKew (GBR)	0
Merve Dinçel (TUR)	2

Quarterfinals
Jade Castillo (DEN)	0
Merve Dinçel (TUR)	2
