= Daba, Gansu =

Daba 大坝镇
- Town
- Location in Gansu
- Coordinates: 38°38′52″N 103°1′56″E
- Country: People's Republic of China
- Province: Gansu
- Prefecture-level city: Wuwei
- County: Minqin County
- Time zone: UTC+8 (China Standard)

Daba (simplified Chinese: 大坝; traditional Chinese: 大垻; pinyin: Dàbà) is a town under the administration of Minqin County, Gansu, China. As of 2020, it has one residential neighborhood, 12 villages, and one state-owned farm community under its administration:

Neighborhood

- Wenhua Community (文化社区)

Villages

- Qirun Village (祁润村)
- Zhangwu Village (张五村)
- Caocheng Village (曹城村)
- Chengjin Village (城近村)
- Liugou Village (六沟村)
- Chengxi Village (城西村)
- Tianbin Village (田斌村)
- Zhangmao Village (张茂村)
- Wenyi Village (文一村)
- Wen'er Village (文二村)
- Bayi Village (八一村)
- Wangmou Village (王谋村)

Farm

- Gansu Province State-Owned Qinfeng Farm Community (甘肃省国营勤锋农场社区)
