= Dabas (surname) =

Dabas is an Indian family name. Notable people with the surname include:

- Jayender Kumar Dabas (born 1968), Councillor ward-36 Rani Khera and Ex Leader of the house NDMC
- Ankit Dabas (born 1992), Indian cricketer
- Parvin Dabas (born 1974), Indian actor, model and director
- Sunil Dabas, Indian female Kabaddi coach
