= Daba, Heping County =

Daba 大坝镇
- Town
- Location in Guangdong
- Coordinates: 24.5041°N 114.9332°E
- Country: People's Republic of China
- Province: Guangdong
- Prefecture-level city: Heyuan
- County: Heping County
- Time zone: UTC+8 (China Standard)

Daba (simplified Chinese: 大坝; traditional Chinese: 大垻; pinyin: Dàbà) is a town under the administration of Heping County, Guangdong, China. As of 2020, it administers Jiedao Residential Community (街道社区) and the following 15 villages:

- Longshi Village (龙狮村)
- Jinxing Village (金星村)
- Shibei Village (石陂村)
- Shuibei Village (水背村)
- Chaotian Village (超田村)
- Shangzhen Village (上镇村)
- Tanghu Village (汤湖村)
- Heshui Village (合水村)
- Etang Village (鹅塘村)
- Shigu Village (石谷村)
- Shijing Village (石井村)
- Pingxi Village (坪溪村)
- Bankeng Village (半坑村)
- Gaofa Village (高发村)
- Laozhen Village (老镇村)
