= Jiangcheng, Yangjiang =

Jiangcheng 江城区
- District
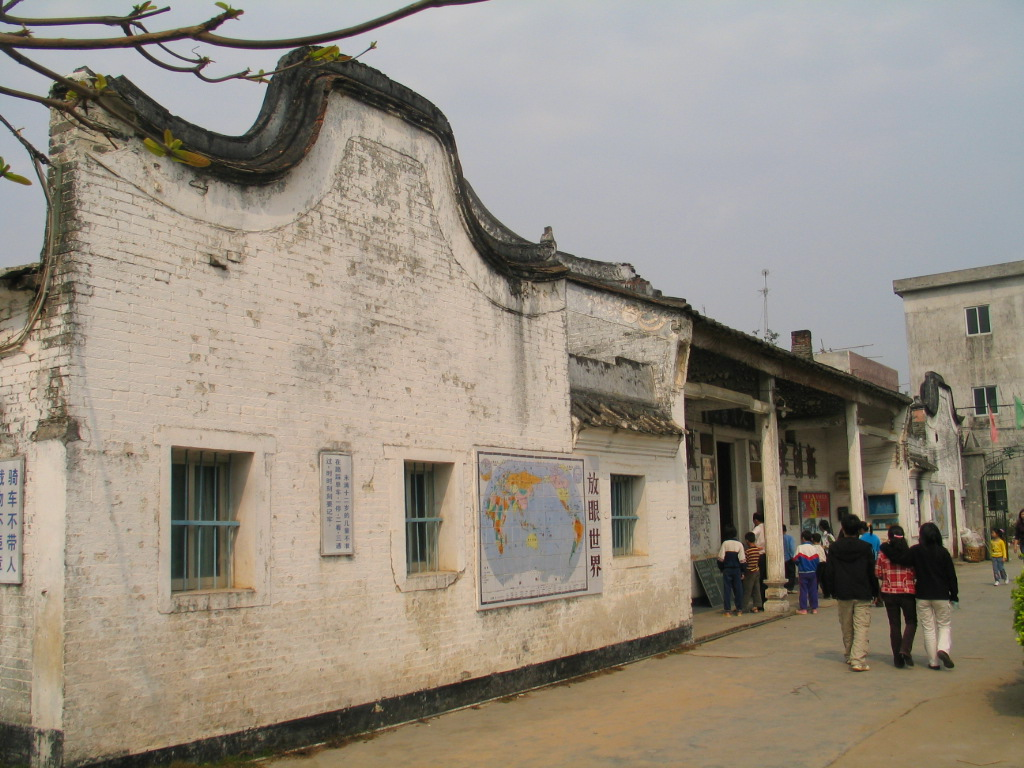

- Location in Guangdong
- Coordinates: 21°51′45″N 111°57′10″E
- Country: People's Republic of China
- Province: Guangdong
- Prefecture-level city: Yangjiang

Area
  - Total: 453 km^{2} (175 sq mi)
- Time zone: UTC+8 (China Standard)

Jiangcheng (Chinese: 江城; pinyin: Jiāngchéng; Jyutping: gong^{1}sing^{4}) is a district of Yangjiang, Guangdong province, China.
