= Dabba (company) =

- Founded: 2004, South Africa
- Founder: Rael Lissoos & Manish Anant

Dabba is a South African company that is pioneering the establishment of village telcos. It uses wireless technology to provide voice and data services to under-serviced areas. Dabba has developed a distributed community based ownership model that encourages local entrepreneurs to provide telephone services not served by fixed line telcos at affordable prices.

Dabba was founded by Rael Lissoos & Manish Anant in 2004. He uses reprogrammed Wi-Fi routers as base stations, and open source software to build the components of a telecommunications network. Cheap Wi-Fi handsets are used to make calls. Dabba offers free calls in the area covered by the local network, and calls to 'phones on the national networks using pay-as-you-go cards.

The first pilot network is in operation in Orange Farm, Gauteng, a township near Johannesburg. In July 2008, Rael was recognised as the Social Entrepreneur of the Year at the Berlin Forum on Social Entrepreneurship. He says "Wireless networks have traditionally been created top-down; we want to do it bottom-up".

== Notes and references ==
The name of the company "Dabba" is given on person name called "Manish Anant"
