= Kırşehir Ahi Evran University =

Public university in Kırşehir, Turkey

- Kırşehir Ahi Evran Üniversitesi
- Type: Public
- Established: 17 March 2006
- Location: Kırşehir, Turkey; 39.143°N 34.120°E
- Colors
- Website: Official website

Kırşehir Ahi Evran University (Turkish: Kırşehir Ahi Evran Üniversitesi) is a university in Kırşehir, Turkey. It was established on 1 March 2006 by Law no. 5467 along with 14 new universities.

== History ==
The origins of Ahi Evran University goes as far as 1961, when a Male Primary Teachers' College (Erkek İlköğretmen Okulu) was established in Kırşehir which continued until 1974. After 1974, the entity was first converted into a Education Institute (Eğitim Enstitüsü). It was placed under Gazi University in 1982 as a Education College (Eğitim Yüksekokulu), awarding two-year associate degrees. The college has been granted the right to award 4-year bachelor degrees in 1988. It was renamed as Kırşehir Education Faculty (Kırşehir Eğitim Fakültesi) in 1992.

Ahi Evran University has been created on 1 March 2006 by transferring the faculties and colleges of Gazi University in Kırşehir Province and the Faculty of Economics and Administrative Sciences of Hacettepe University. The university was renamed to its current name on 18 May 2018 by a law.
