= Bruna Duvančić =

Croatian taekwondo practitioner

Personal information
- Born: 28 October 2004 (age 21)

Sport
- Country: Croatia
- Sport: Taekwondo
- Weight class: 49 kg
Medal record
Women's taekwondo
Representing Croatia
World Championships
Bronze medal – third place	2023 Baku	49 kg
European Championships
Bronze medal – third place	2022 Manchester	49 kg
Bronze medal – third place	2024 Belgrade	49 kg
Mediterranean Games
Bronze medal – third place	2022 Oran	49 kg
European U21 Championships
Silver medal – second place	2024 Sarajevo	49 kg

Bruna Duvančić (born 28 October 2004) is a Croatian taekwondo practitioner. She won one of the bronze medals in the women's flyweight event at the 2023 World Taekwondo Championships held in Baku, Azerbaijan. In 2022, she won one of the bronze medals in her event at the European Taekwondo Championships held in Manchester, United Kingdom.

Duvančić also won one of the bronze medals in the women's 49 kg event at the 2022 Mediterranean Games held in Oran, Algeria. A few months later, she competed in the women's flyweight event at the 2022 World Taekwondo Championships held in Manchester, United Kingdom.

In 2024, she won one of the bronze medals in the women's 49 kg event at the European Taekwondo Championships held in Belgrade, Serbia.

Her sister Ivana is also a taekwondo practitioner who won medal at World Taekwondo Championship.

== Achievements ==
Year	Event	Location	Place
2022	European Championships	Manchester, United Kingdom	3rd
2022	Mediterranean Games	Oran, Algeria	3rd
2023	World Championships	Baku, Azerbaijan	3rd
2024	European Championships	Belgrade, Serbia	3rd
