= Dabbas (surname) =

Dabbas (also anglicized as Debbas; Arabic: دَبَّاس, romanized: Dabbās) is an Arabic-language surname from the word دَبَّاس (dabbās) meaning 'maker or seller of دِبْس (dibs, 'syrup, molasses')'. Notable people with the surname include:

- Athanasius II Dabbas (1552–1619), Greek Orthodox Patriarch of Antioch (1612–1619)
- Cyril IV Dabbas (1560–1627), Greek Orthodox Patriarch of Antioch claimant who contended with Ignatius III Atiyah
- Athanasius III Dabbas (1647–1724), Greek Orthodox Patriarch of Antioch (1685-1696 and 1720–1724)
- Sylvester I Dabbas, Greek Orthodox Patriarch of Antioch (after 1724 split) (1724–1766)
- Mohammad Dabbas (1927–2014), Jordanian politician
- Charles Debbas (1884–1935), Eastern Orthodox Lebanese political figure
- J. Abdo Debbas, Ottoman Greek who served as American vice-consul at Tarsus
- Ralph Debbas (born 1987), Lebanese automotive entrepreneur, designer, and businessman

== See also ==
- Mohammad Bin Dabbas, paralympic athlete from the United Arab Emirates
