= Daba Township, Zhaojue County =

Daba Township 大坝乡
- Township
- Location in Sichuan
- Coordinates: 27°54′52″N 102°46′6″E
- Country: People's Republic of China
- Province: Sichuan
- Autonomous prefecture: Liangshan Yi Autonomous Prefecture
- County: Zhaojue County
- Time zone: UTC+8 (China Standard)

Daba Township (simplified Chinese: 大坝乡; traditional Chinese: 大垻鄉; pinyin: Dàbà Xiāng) is a township under the administration of Zhaojue County, Sichuan, China. As of 2020, it has five villages under its administration:

- Keqie Village (科且村)
- Wabuguli Village (瓦布谷立村)
- Tuodu Village (拖都村)
- Luowu Village (洛五村)
- Teluo Village (特洛村)

== See also ==
- List of township-level divisions of Sichuan
