= Daba Miao Ethnic Township =

Daba Miao Ethnic Township 大坝苗族乡
- Ethnic township
- Location in Sichuan
- Coordinates: 28°7′53″N 105°9′35″E
- Country: People's Republic of China
- Province: Sichuan
- Prefecture-level city: Yibin
- County: Xingwen County
- Time zone: UTC+8 (China Standard)

Daba Miao Ethnic Township (simplified Chinese: 大坝苗族乡; traditional Chinese: 大垻苗族鄉; pinyin: Dàbà Miáo Zú Xiāng) is an ethnic township for Miao people, which is under the administration of Xingwen County, Sichuan, China. As of 2020, it administers Yanzhou Residential Community (晏州社区) and the following 11 villages:

- Pingzhai Village (平寨村)
- Xiaozhai Village (小寨村)
- Longtang Village (龙塘村)
- Hongqi Village (红旗村)
- Chaoyang Village (朝阳村)
- Jianguo Village (建国村)
- Bai'aolin Village (柏坳林村)
- Bamaowan Village (芭茅湾村)
- Gufotai Village (古佛台村)
- Silong Village (四龙村)
- Shaba Village (沙坝村)

== See also ==
- List of township-level divisions of Sichuan
