= South African wireless community networks =

Map of South Africa

South African wireless community networks are wireless networks that allow members to talk, send messages, share files and play games independent of the commercial landline and mobile telephone networks. Most of them use WiFi technology and many are wireless mesh networks. A wireless community network may connect to the public switched telephone network and/or the Internet, but there are various restrictions on connectivity in South Africa. Wireless community networks are particularly useful in areas where commercial telecommunications services are unavailable or unaffordable.

Wireless User Groups (WUGs) in South African cities build up infrastructure and applications, as well as training members in wireless technology skills. Therefore, WUGs provide a fertile ground for new technology and applications that may have large social benefits in informal communities and rural areas of South Africa and neighboring countries.

== Background: South African Telecommunications Environment ==
South Africa has the best developed and most modern telephone system in Africa. There are almost 110 combined fixed-line and cellular telephones per 100 persons. There are 5.1 million Internet users. The network is 99.9% digital. The fixed-line monopoly of Telkom SA, a listed company in which the government is the largest shareholder, expired with the licensing of Neotel as South Africa's second national operator, starting operations in November 2007. Neotel is licensed to provide the entire range of telecoms services with the exception of full mobility. Neotel is expanding their network fast, but so far is concentrating on urban areas. The South African mobile communications market is growing fast. The country's three cellular network operators (Vodacom, MTN and Cell C) have over 39-million subscribers, or nearly 80% of the population.

However, although there are now over one million broadband subscribers, mostly using ADSL or HSDPA, bandwidth remains relatively limited and expensive. Major cities such as Cape Town, Durban, Johannesburg and Pretoria have launched public-private initiatives to build their own broadband networks to provide cheaper voice and data services. For example, the city of Tshwane, which includes Pretoria, is testing delivery of broadband Internet and voice services on their new metro-wide fibre-optic network using wireless hot spots to provide ADSL access. In the meantime, the high cost of broadband access has stimulated development of Wireless User Groups. The WUGS are not allowed to sell internet connectivity, since they are non-commercial community networks. Although non-profit and operating in the license-exempt spectrums, their legal status is not clear. In October 2007, JAWUG requested clarification on whether it required a radio frequency spectrum and/or ECNS license for its activities.

Telkom provides relatively poor voice and internet service in underdeveloped rural areas of South Africa, although it is investigating ways to improve service using wireless technology. The Independent Communications Authority of South Africa has licensed several small telecoms firms to operate regional networks in remote, under-served areas of the country. Bokone Telecoms in Polokwane and Amathole Telecoms in the Eastern Cape are experimenting with WiMAX technology to provide service. However, due to relatively high costs and low revenue potential, these initiatives are moving slowly. There is room for more innovative approaches.

Currently, VoIP (Voice over Internet Protocol) service is allowed only in areas where less than five percent of the population have access to a telephone, and WiFi is restricted to use by individuals or organisations within the confines of their own premises. The argument is that low-cost or free VoIP over WiFi would destroy the incentive for commercial network providers to upgrade rural networks. However, several commentators consider that this policy is counter-productive. As discussed later, many wireless community networks deliberately ignore the restrictions.

== Sample City-Based Wireless Community Networks ==
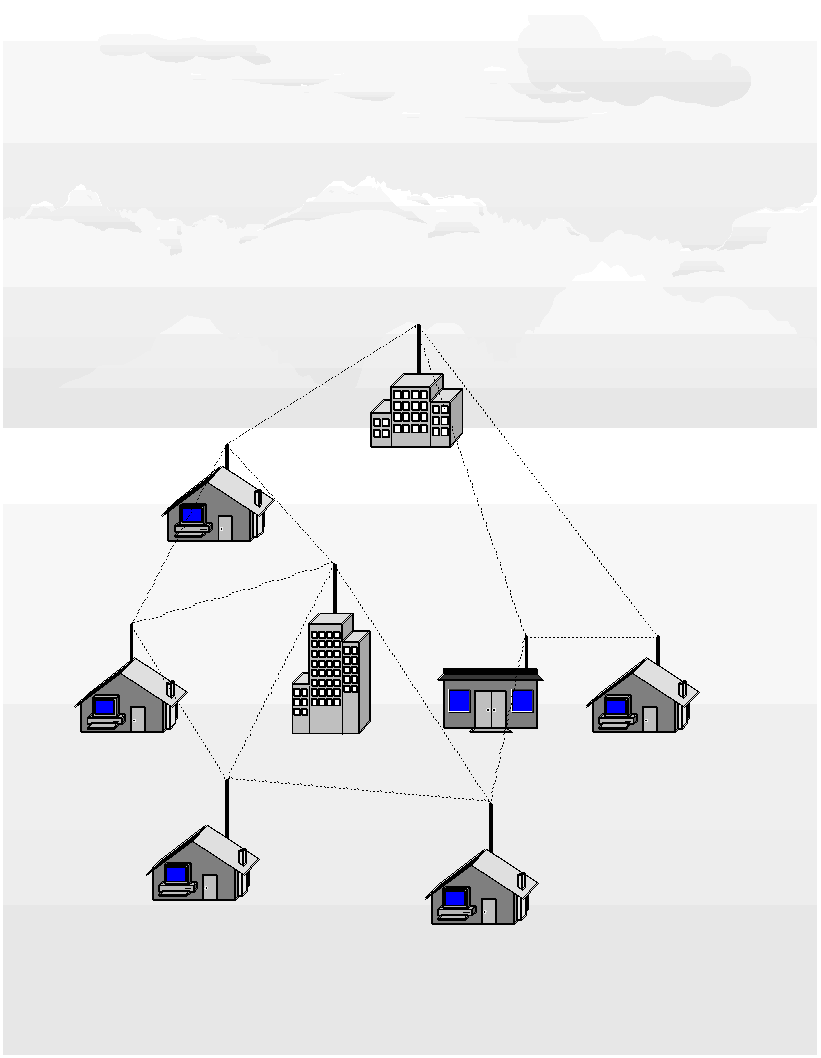
Wireless Mesh Network. Packets are relayed from one node to another until they reach their destination.

Most cities in South Africa have one or more non-profit groups collaborating in running Wireless User Groups. Descriptions of a sample are given below, with information derived from their web sites.

=== Johannesburg WUG (JAWUG) ===
Jawug is located in Johannesburg, the largest city in South Africa. Jawug, founded in 2002 by Kieran Murphy, Justin Jonker, Ross Clarke and Steven Carter, was the first wireless user group in South Africa, starting as an experimental network between four students, then quickly expanding into a much larger network by interconnecting several separate wireless mesh networks. Jawug is not an ISP. Its network is used purely for non-commercial and educational purposes. Jawug is regularly used for experimental deployment of new technologies. There are currently four links which interconnect the Jawug network with PTAWUG, the Wireless User Group in Pretoria, to the north of Johannesburg. Jawug and PTAWUG work together closely - Jawug helped to get PTAWUG off the ground. Jawug also gives technical assistance to new wireless users groups like Port Elizabeth Wireless Users Group (PEWUG). A core team of members manage all routing and highsite maintenance. Regular wugmeets are held to discuss network issues and future plans.

Jawug has a membership base of approximately 300 locations, and is constantly expanding.

=== Pretoria WUG (PTAWUG) ===
The Pretoria WUG was founded on 28 July 2007. The PTAWUG constitution guarantees openness, free participation and equality to all members of the Wireless User Group. PTAWUG is exclusively funded by donations from the community. Volunteers conduct highsite installation and maintenance in their spare time. PTAWUG is the 5th largest wireless network organization in the world with about 600 member connections (7 October 2009). To avoid rental costs, all highsites are on privately owned properties, mostly in high areas with a good line of sight to the surrounding areas. The network has a number of towers, with the other highsites located on tall buildings or at private residences in strategic places.

The Pretoria Wireless Project is another community based network in the city, which has been connected to the Pretoria WUG network as of 3 February 2008.

=== Cape Town Wireless User Group (CTWUG) ===
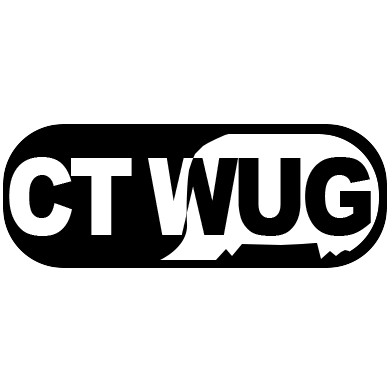
CTWUG Logo

The Cape Town Wireless User Group has been around since about 2005 as a small network between friends. Since then it has grown to a citywide network. CTWUG has over 1500 user sites all around Cape Town - spanning all the way from Houtbay to Stellenbosch and into the Helderberg. CTWUG is a non-profit organisation that is geared towards community based wireless networking with a focus to promote the use and understanding of wireless equipment in order to build a citywide free wireless network. The building of this network forms a social and interactive community where people with an interest in expanding and improving the network donate time, money and equipment to the group.

CTWUG runs many network enhancements, including a GameTime system which stops all bulk traffic during certain hours for gaming and other high-priority network uses. CTWUG puts a lot of priority in making sure the network is usable for as many applications and uses as possible.

No monthly or annual fees of any kind is asked for membership and all contributions are completely voluntary. CTWUG maintains good vendor relationships to ensure high quality equipment is used and supplied for all network links.

=== Durban Wireless Community ===
The Durban Wireless Community was founded in December 2004 by a group of people interested in 802.11 a/b/g wireless technology in Durban, the third most populous city in South Africa. The first meeting in January 2005 had 4 attendees. The group now has about 200 people on the mailing list and about 15 live nodes on the network spanning from Bluff to Umbilo, Morningside, Town, Tollgate and Westville. Goals of the non-profit group, which is free to join and open to all, include educating the public about wireless technology, and learning more about the technology. The Durban Wireless Community has close ties to JAWUG.

=== Potchefstroom Community Network ===
The Potchefstroom Community Network is a non-profit grassroots effort by members of the community to provide a broadband network between its members, using inexpensive off-the-shelf (WiFi) radio networking equipment. The network operates in the license-exempt 2.4 GHz frequency spectrum.

=== Stellenbosch Community Network ===
The Stellenbosch Community Network is a joint project between Stellenbosch University and the Stellenbosch Local Municipality in Western Cape Province, South Africa. Its purpose is to provide the community with wireless access to University and Municipality services. The network is in a pilot phase. It will be operated as an open public network, accessible to anyone with the right equipment.

=== iNethi Community Network ===
This is an exception to the urban norm described above, namely hobbyists who generally have commercial internet access but want something more. In this case, which is currently located in Ocean View outside Cape Town but intends to expand, most users have no other internet access; also, the network hosts many resources in its "cloudlet" server/s, such as user-generated video-sharing applications; such local resources are free to use, while access to the wider internet is on the basis of prepaid vouchers. The project is supported by the University of Cape Town.

== Rural Wireless Community Networks ==
Although the city-based community networks are typically run by hobbyists who may be primarily interested in experimenting with technology and avoiding high broadband charges while playing Internet games, they serve also as test beds for more serious projects and training grounds for wireless network engineers that may benefit projects in poor rural and informal communities. In these communities, wireless mesh networks may have great medical, educational and economic value, giving affordable telephone and internet access when coupled with initiatives such as One Laptop per Child that aim to provide low-cost devices - assuming the regulator continues to remove obstacles to deploying WiFi community networks.

=== Meraka Institute ===
The Meraka Institute is a government-backed organization to promote ICT development. The Wireless Africa programme of the Meraka Institute is researching ways to develop sustainable information and communications technology in developing countries. Research follows two tracks:

- Social research into how projects in communities around South Africa, Angola and Mozambique are able to create sustainable community-owned wireless infrastructure, with focus on applications in health, education and related service delivery areas.
- Ways to overcome technology barriers and enable bottom-up creation of wireless access infrastructure. This includes research into mesh networking, low cost voice/messaging devices, low cost access points and antennas, and network security. Experimental test bed mesh networks have been installed in Pretoria and Mpumalanga to understand issues such as scalability and quality of service.

=== Peebles Valley Mesh Project ===
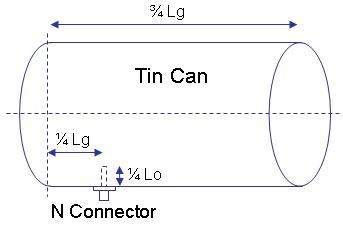
Design for a Waveguide WiFi Antenna using a tin can and an N connector. Cost containment is crucial for rural WUGs.

The Peebles Valley mesh project is using wireless mesh networking as a low cost first mile solution connect people to the internet and each other. The project is testing if a rural community can take ownership of the network, with a trial community-run WUG near the Kruger National Park in the Mpumalanga Province. The project uses "Cantennas" to connect to the wireless mesh network. These are small, self-constructed antennas made from locally available material connected to a low-cost WiFi card plugged into a computer. Although sponsored by the Meraka Institute, the project members state that what they are doing is illegal under current laws.

=== UWC Telehealth ===
Another project, UWC Telehealth, is testing a system in a remote rural part of the Eastern Cape in South Africa that lets nurses and doctors use a wireless IP-based communication system to conduct patient referrals, request ambulance services and order supplies. The project ran into difficulties at first because Voice over Internet Protocol (VoIP) was illegal in South Africa, even over the UWC Telehealth network. The regulator removed this restriction, but there are still legislative obstacles to providing Internet access, which the project directors are challenging.

=== Zenzeleni Networks ===
This project is a "descendant" of the UWC Telehealth one above, in that UWC applied its learnings to support a more extensive project. After initially providing a local VOIP service, full internet was provided as smart phones became more widespread. Starting in Mankosi in the Eastern Cape, Zenzeleni expanded first to Zithulele and at time of writing, is planning further expansion.

=== Orange Farm and the Mesh Potato ===
Orange Farm is an informal settlement of about 300,000 people south of Johannesburg. Most people cannot afford mobile phones, and cannot afford to use the Internet cafes. However Dabba, a telecommunications company, is providing affordable telephone service in Orange Farm through wireless mesh technology. Dabba has installed several wireless routers that relay signals to an internet connection in a local community centre. Anyone within range of one of the routers can make phone calls using a Wi-Fi or SIP (Session Initiation Protocol) telephone. Calls within the network are free, and Dabba supports low-cost prepaid calls to telephones on other networks. However, the phones average about $100 each and it takes significant technical knowledge and investment to build a network like this, so the model may not work in poorer rural communities.

Dabba is now working with the Shuttleworth Foundation, a non-profit South African charitable organization, in the Village telco project to develop an affordable and easy-to-install telephone system for rural communities. The goal was to design a system costing no more than US$5000 to get started, which a small-scale local entrepreneur could afford, and which would break even within six months. The project came up with the concept of a "mesh potato", a cheap device (perhaps $60 per unit) that can connect a standard analog telephone to the wireless network and also serves as a wireless mesh node, relaying signals from other mesh potatoes to a central wireless internet connection. Dabba (and other companies with a similar model) will provide advice to wireless community network owners and connectivity to the outside world. The technology has been tested and several manufacturers are showing interest in building the devices. The Village Telco concept may have potential in many other countries outside South Africa.
