= Madinabonu Mannopova =

Uzbekistani taekwondo practitioner

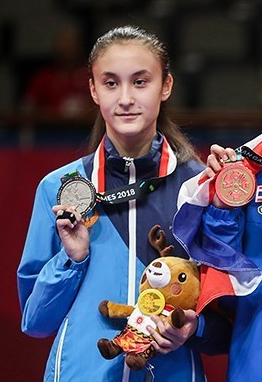
- Mannopova at the 2018 Asian Games

Personal information
- Nationality: Uzbekistan
- Born: 13 April 2001 (age 25) Uzbekistan
- Height: 170 cm (5 ft 7 in)

Sport
- Country: Uzbekistan
- Sport: Taekwondo
- Weight class: –49 kg
- Coached by: Akmal Irgashev
Medal record
Women's taekwondo
Representing Uzbekistan
Asian Games
| Silver medal – second place | 2018 Jakarta | –49 kg |
| Bronze medal – third place | 2022 Hangzhou | –49 kg |
Asian Championships
| Silver medal – second place | 2021 Beirut | –49 kg |
| Bronze medal – third place | 2018 Ho Chi Minh City | –46 kg |
Grand Prix
| Bronze medal – third place | 2023 Taiyuan | –49 kg |
Military World Games
| Gold medal – first place | 2019 Wuhan | –49 kg |
FISU World University Games
| Silver medal – second place | 2021 Chengdu | Team |

Madinabonu Mannopova (born 13 April 2001) is an Uzbekistani taekwondo athlete. She won a silver medal at the 2018 Asian Games and a bronze at the 2018 Asian Championships.
