= Yangchun =

Yangchun 阳春市 Yeungchun
- County-level & Sub-prefectural city
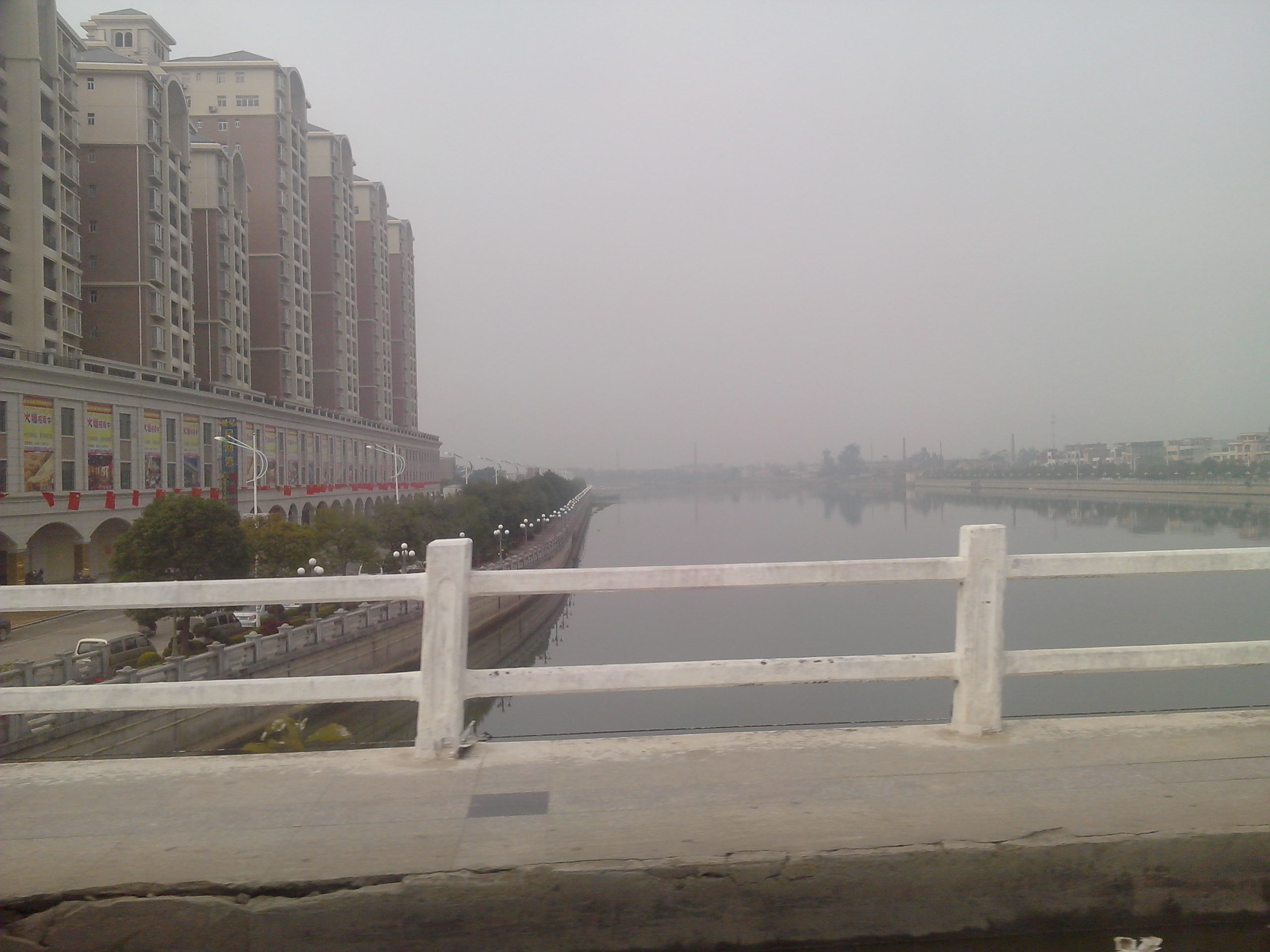

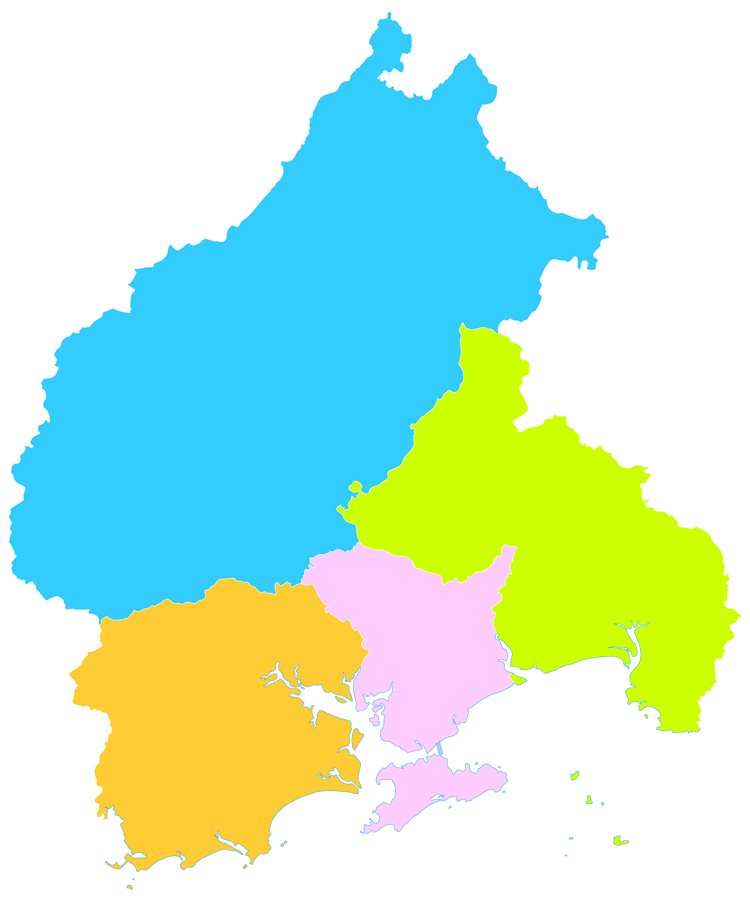
- Yangchun is the northernmost division on this map of Yangjiang

- Location within Guangdong
- Coordinates: 22°10′13″N 111°47′30″E
- Country: People's Republic of China
- Province: Guangdong
- Prefecture-level city: Yangjiang

Area
  - Total: 4,055 km^{2} (1,566 sq mi)

Population (2010 census)
  - Total: 849,504
  - Density: 209.5/km^{2} (542.6/sq mi)
- Time zone: UTC+8 (China Standard)
- Postal code: 529600
- Area code: 662
- Licence plates: 粤QX, 粤QY
- Website: Official website

Yangchun
- Simplified Chinese: 阳春
- Traditional Chinese: 陽春
- Hanyu Pinyin: Yángchūn
- Cantonese Yale: Yèuhngchēun
- Postal: Yeungchun
- Literal meaning: Sunny Spring; Yang Spring
Transcriptions
Standard Mandarin
- Hanyu Pinyin: Yángchūn
- Gwoyeu Romatzyh: Yangchuen
- Wade–Giles: Yang^{2}-ch‘un^{1}
- IPA: [jǎŋ.ʈʂʰwə́n]
Yue: Cantonese
- Yale Romanization: Yèuhngchēun
- Jyutping: Joeng4ceon1
- IPA: [jœŋ˩.tsʰɵn˥]

Yangchun, alternately romanized as Yeungchun, (Note: Yangchun has also been romanized as Yang Chun, Yung-chun, and Yang-chuen.) (local pronunciation: [jɛŋ^{31} ʦʰɐn^{45}]) is a county-level city in southwestern Guangdong, China, administered as a part of the prefecture-level city of Yangjiang. Yangchun has an area of 4,055 km^{2} (1,566 sq mi) and had approximately 1.05 million inhabitants in 2003.

== History ==
Under the Qing, Yangchun County made up part of the commandery of Zhaoqing.

== Administrative divisions ==
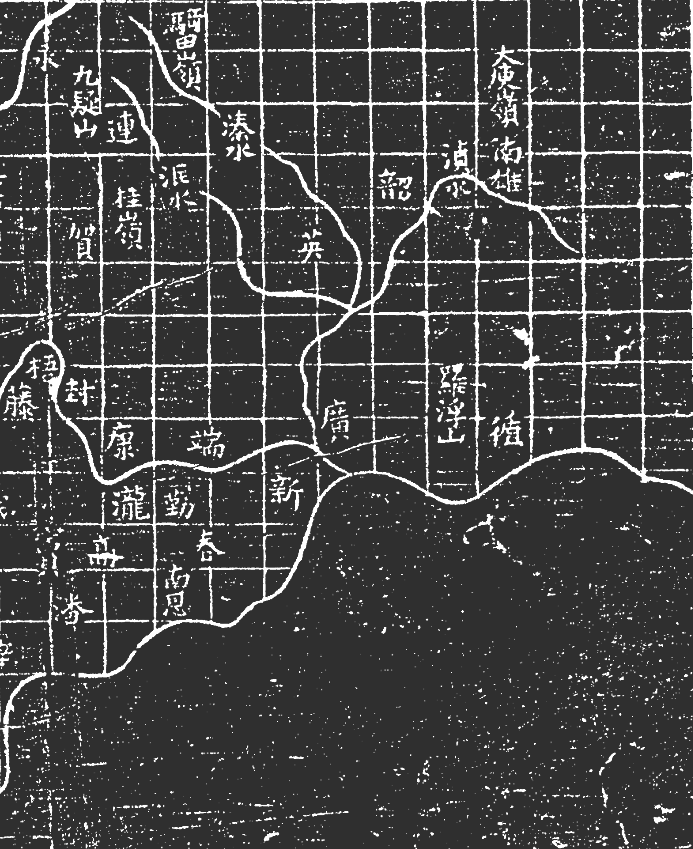
Yangchun (as Chunzhou) on the 1136 Yuji Tu

Yangchun is divided into the urban quarter Chuncheng (春城街道) and fifteen towns (镇).

The municipalities are:

- 河塱镇 Helang Town
- 松柏镇 Songbai Town
- 石望镇 Shiwang Town
- 春湾镇 Chunwan Town
- 合水镇 Heshui Town
- 陂面镇 Baimian Town
- 圭岗镇 Guigang Town
- 永宁镇 Yongning Town
- 马水镇 Mashui Town
- 岗美镇 Gangmei Town
- 河口镇 Hekou Town
- 潭水镇 Tanshui Town
- 三甲镇 Sanjia Town
- 双滘镇 Shuangjiao Town
- 八甲镇 Bajia Town

== Climate ==
Climate data for Yangchun, elevation 38 m (125 ft), (1991–2020 normals, extremes 1955–2010)
Month	Jan	Feb	Mar	Apr	May	Jun	Jul	Aug	Sep	Oct	Nov	Dec	Year
Record high °C (°F)	28.6 (83.5)	29.4 (84.9)	30.1 (86.2)	33.1 (91.6)	35.1 (95.2)	36.9 (98.4)	37.4 (99.3)	38.4 (101.1)	37.4 (99.3)	33.4 (92.1)	33.9 (93.0)	30.0 (86.0)	38.4 (101.1)
Mean daily maximum °C (°F)	19.7 (67.5)	20.9 (69.6)	23.2 (73.8)	27.0 (80.6)	30.5 (86.9)	32.1 (89.8)	32.7 (90.9)	32.9 (91.2)	31.8 (89.2)	29.4 (84.9)	25.8 (78.4)	21.5 (70.7)	27.3 (81.1)
Daily mean °C (°F)	15.2 (59.4)	16.7 (62.1)	19.5 (67.1)	23.4 (74.1)	26.6 (79.9)	28.1 (82.6)	28.6 (83.5)	28.4 (83.1)	27.4 (81.3)	24.9 (76.8)	21.0 (69.8)	16.8 (62.2)	23.1 (73.5)
Mean daily minimum °C (°F)	12.2 (54.0)	14.0 (57.2)	17.0 (62.6)	21.0 (69.8)	24.0 (75.2)	25.6 (78.1)	25.9 (78.6)	25.6 (78.1)	24.5 (76.1)	21.6 (70.9)	17.6 (63.7)	13.5 (56.3)	20.2 (68.4)
Record low °C (°F)	−1.8 (28.8)	3.5 (38.3)	4.1 (39.4)	9.8 (49.6)	14.6 (58.3)	18.9 (66.0)	21.6 (70.9)	22.6 (72.7)	16.2 (61.2)	10.8 (51.4)	4.9 (40.8)	1.4 (34.5)	−1.8 (28.8)
Average precipitation mm (inches)	53.0 (2.09)	62.9 (2.48)	83.5 (3.29)	201.4 (7.93)	301.8 (11.88)	488.1 (19.22)	392.6 (15.46)	332.5 (13.09)	238.2 (9.38)	97.1 (3.82)	52.2 (2.06)	39.5 (1.56)	2,342.8 (92.26)
Average precipitation days (≥ 0.1 mm)	8.3	10.8	15.8	16.2	19.5	21.8	19.8	18.8	14.8	6.4	6.2	5.9	164.3
Average relative humidity (%)	73	78	82	82	81	83	81	81	78	71	69	67	77
Mean monthly sunshine hours	109.8	80.2	63.3	85.8	138.7	154.2	194.2	178.6	173.3	189.4	163.1	142.6	1,673.2
Percentage possible sunshine	32	25	17	23	34	38	47	45	48	53	49	43	38
Source: China Meteorological Administration all-time record low
