= Yangdong, Yangjiang =

Yangdong 阳东区
- District
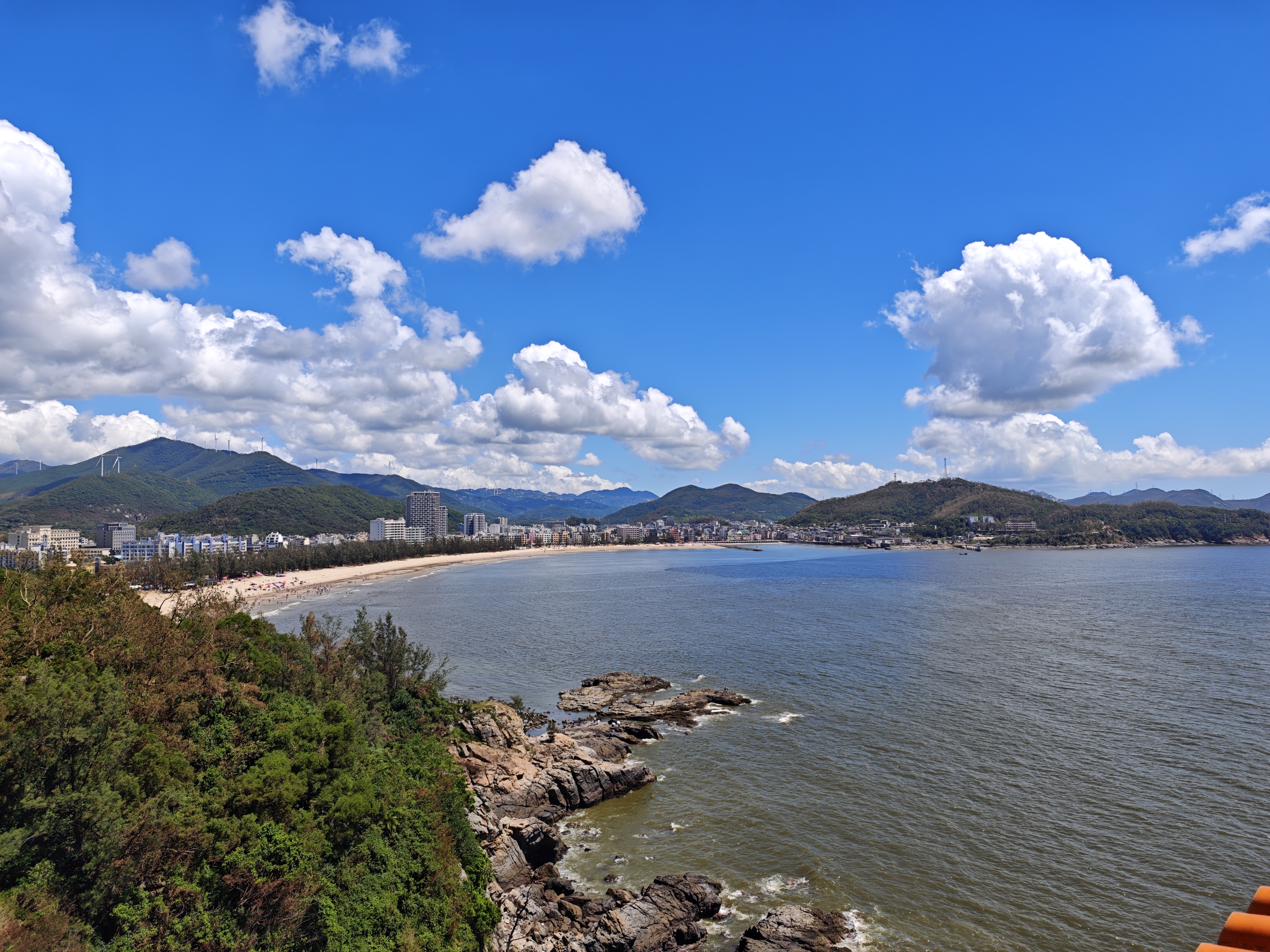

- Location in Guangdong
- Coordinates: 21°52′05″N 112°00′22″E
- Country: People's Republic of China
- Province: Guangdong
- Prefecture-level city: Yangjiang

Area
  - Total: 2,043 km^{2} (789 sq mi)
- Time zone: UTC+8 (China Standard)

Yangdong District (simplified Chinese: 阳东区; traditional Chinese: 陽東區; pinyin: Yángdōng Qū; Jyutping: Jeong^{4}dung^{1}keoi^{1}) is a district of the city of Yangjiang, Guangdong Province, China.

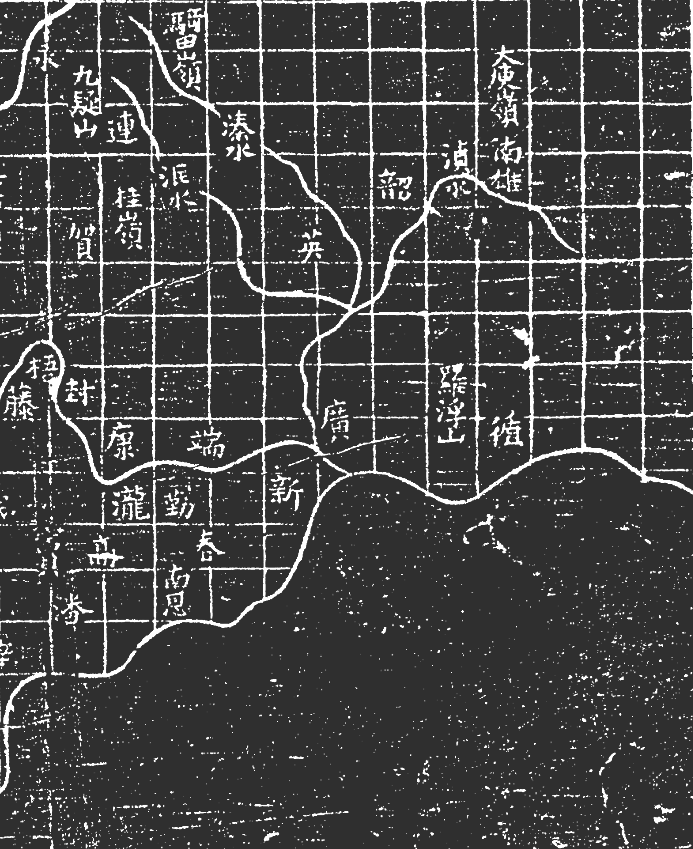
Xinzhou on the 1136 Yuji Tu

== History ==
Yangdong was the site of Xin Prefecture (新州, Xinzhou) under the Song.
