= Merve Dinçel =

Turkish taekwondo practitioner

Personal information
- Full name: Merve Dinçel Kavurat
- Born: 22 October 1999 (age 26) Turkey
- Education: Physical education at Kırşehir Ahi Evran University
- Height: 1.70 m (5 ft 7 in)
- Weight: 49 kg (108 lb)
- Spouse: Ferhat Can Kavurat (m. 2023)

Sport
- Country: Turkey
- Sport: Taekwondo
- Event: 49 kg
- Club: Istanbul BB SK
- Coached by: Ali Şahin
Medal record
Women's taekwondo
Representing Turkey
World Championships
Gold medal – first place	2023 Baku	49 kg
Gold medal – first place	2025 Wuxi	53 kg
European Championships
Gold medal – first place	2022 Manchester	49 kg
Gold medal – first place	2026 Munich	53 kg
Silver medal – second place	2024 Belgrade	49 kg
European Games
Silver medal – second place	2023 Kraków-Małopolska	49 kg
Grand Prix
Gold medal – first place	2023 Paris	49 kg
Silver medal – second place	2022 Paris	49 kg
Silver medal – second place	2022 Manchester	49 kg
Silver medal – second place	2022 Riyadh (F)	49 kg
Bronze medal – third place	2023 Manchester (F)	49 kg
Mediterranean Games
Gold medal – first place	2022 Oran	49 kg
World University Games
Silver medal – second place	2023 Chengdu	49 kg
European U21 Championships
Gold medal – first place	2018 Warsaw	49 kg

Merve Dinçel Kavurat (born Marve Dinçel; on 22 October 1999), also known as Merve Kavurat, is a Turkish taekwondo athlete. She is a two-time gold medalist at the World Taekwondo Championships.

== Sport career ==
Merve Dinçel has won a gold medal at the World Taekwondo Women's Open Championships held in Saudi Arabia's capital Riyadh in 2021. She won the gold medal in the women's 49 kg event at the 2022 European Championships held in Manchester, United Kingdom.

She won the gold medal in the women's 49 kg event at the 2022 Mediterranean Games held in Orran, Algeria.

Dinçel, in the women's 49 kg category at the 2023 World Taekwondo Championships in Baku, Azerbaijan, defeated Elizaveta Ryadninskaya, a Russian athlete competing as an individual athlete, in the second round and advanced to the third round after passing the first round without a match. She defeated Dunya Abutaleb from Saudi Arabia in the third round, then defeated Botakoz Kapanova from Kazakhstan in the quarterfinals and reached the semifinals. In the 49 kg final, she won against the reigning Olympic champion Panipak Wongpattanakit from Thailand.

Later that year, Dinçel won the silver medal in the women's 49 kg weight class at the 2023 European Games and the 2023 World University Games.

At the 2023 World Grand Prix, she took the bronze medal in Manchester, United Kingdom, and the gold medal in Paris, France. She won the gold medal at the 2023 World Championships in Baku, Azerbaijan. She was honored with the "Best Sportswoman of 2023" award by the World Taekwondo.

In 2024, she won the silver medal in the women's 49 kg event at the European Taekwondo Championships held in Belgrade, Serbia.

She competed in the 49 kg at the 2024 Summer Olympics in Paris, France, and advanced to the quarterfinals. After losing her match in the quarterfinals, she won the repechage match. She fought in the bronze medal match against Lena Stojković and placed fifth after losing the fight.

== Personal life ==
Merve Dinçel was born on 22 October 1999. She studied Physical Education in the Faculty of Sport science at Kırşehir Ahi Evran University. She married Ferhat Can Kavurat, also a national taekwondo practitioner, on 13 July 2023.

== Tournament record ==
Year	Event	Location	G-Rank	Place
2023	Grand Prix (F)	(United Kingdom) Manchester	G-10	3rd
2023	World Championships	(Azerbaijan) Baku	G-12	1st
2023	Grand Prix	(France) Paris	G-6	1st
2023	European Games	(Poland) Kraków	G-4	2nd
2023	FISU World University Games	(China) Chengdu	G-2	2nd
2022	European Championships	(United Kingdom) Manchester	G-4	1st
2022	Spanish Open	(Spain) La Nucia	G-1	1st
2022	Turkish Open	(Turkey) Antalya	G-1	1st
2022	WT Presidents Cup - Europe	(Albania) Durrës	G-1	1st
2021	WT Women Championships	(Saudi Arabia) Riyadh	G-4	1st
2021	Multi European Games	(Bulgaria) Sofia	G-1	1st
2021	WT Presidents Cup - Europe	(Turkey) Istanbul	G-1	1st
2021	Bosnia Herzegovina Open	(Bosnia and Herzegovina) Sarajevo	G-1	2nd
2020	European Clubs Championships	(Sweden) Helsingborg	G-1	3rd
2020	Turkish Open	(Turkey) Istanbul	G-1	3rd
2019	WT Presidents Cup - Europe	(Turkey) Antalya	G-1	1st
2018	European U-21 Championships	(Poland) Warsaw	G-4	1st
2018	European Clubs Championships	(Turkey) Istanbul	G-1	1st
2018	Turkish Open	(Turkey) Istanbul	G-1	1st
2018	WT Presidents Cup - Europe	(Greece) Athen	G-1	1st
2018	Multi European Games	(Bulgaria) Plovdiv	G-1	1st
2018	Dutch Open	(Netherlands) Eindhoven	G-1	3rd
2017	Dutch Open	(Netherlands) Eindhoven	G-1	1st
2017	Turkish Open	(Turkey) Antalya	G-1	2nd
