= Daba, Puning =

Daba 大坝镇
- Town
- Location in Guangdong
- Coordinates: 23°22′12″N 116°10′40″E
- Country: People's Republic of China
- Province: Guangdong
- Prefecture-level city: Jieyang
- County-level city: Puning
- Time zone: UTC+8 (China Standard)

Daba (simplified Chinese: 大坝; traditional Chinese: 大垻; pinyin: Dàbà) is a town under the administration of Puning, Guangdong, China. As of 2020, it administers Daba Residential Neighborhood and the following 26 villages:

- Daba Village
- Baikeng Village (白坑村)
- Banjing Village (半径村)
- Sheqian Village (社前村)
- Macuozhai Village (马厝宅村)
- Fumeiling Village (富美岭村)
- Tieshanyang Village (铁山洋村)
- Jiujiang Village (九江村)
- Liangtian Village (粮田村)
- Shanding Village (山顶村)
- Hengshan Village (横山村)
- Pinglin Village (平林村)
- Zhaihe Village (寨河村)
- Xinxi Village (新锡村)
- Huludi Village (葫芦地村)
- Beiwu Village (陂乌村)
- Laodongkeng Village (老东坑村)
- Xindongkeng Village (新东坑村)
- Dingshenshui Village (顶深水村)
- Humei Village (湖美村)
- Shang Village (上村)
- Yueku Village (月窟村)
- Duxiangliao Village (杜香寮村)
- Huadong Village (华东村)
- Xianyun Village (仙耘村)
- Taixing Village (太兴村)

Daba covers an area of 59 km^{2}. By 2017, Daba Town has a population of 89860. The main transportation methods are bus and car. The provincial highway is just across the town center. Daba is in the tropical zone and windy all year around. Summer starts from May and usually ends in December. Winter starts from December and ends in April. Raining season usually lasts from April to May. The main economy for Daba is clothing processing. The majority of Daba people are Teochew people. Traditional religious like Buddhism and Taoism are still prevalent in Daba.
