= Mobina Nematzadeh =

Iranian taekwondo practitioner

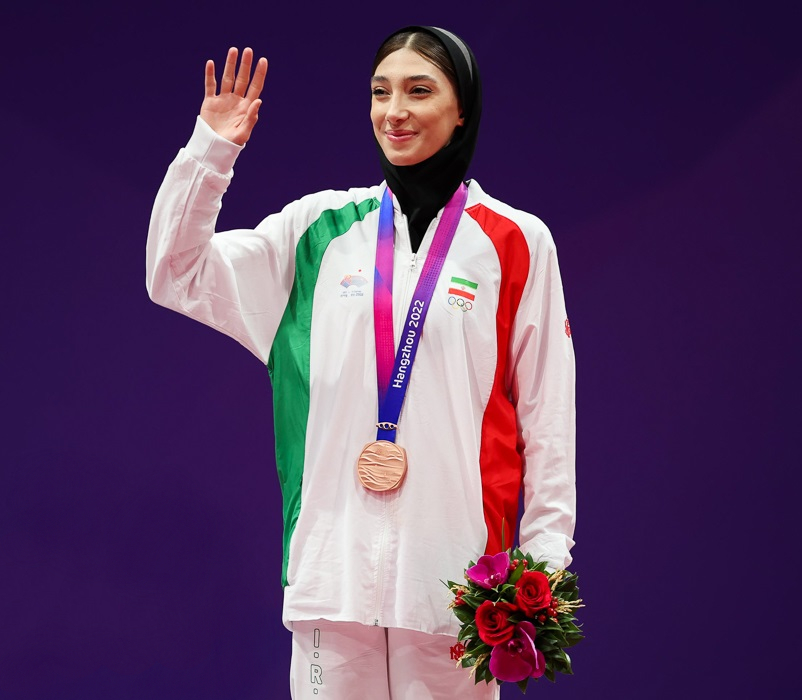
- Nematzadeh at the 2022 Asian Games

Personal information
- Born: May 17, 2005 (age 21) Tehran, Iran
- Height: 181 cm (5 ft 11 in)
- Weight: 53 kg (117 lb)

Sport
- Country: Iran
- Sport: Taekwondo
- Coached by: Mahrouz Saei (National Team)
Medal record
Women's Taekwondo
Representing Iran
Olympic Games
| Bronze medal – third place | 2024 Paris | 49 kg |
Asian Games
| Bronze medal – third place | 2022 Hangzhou | 49 kg |
Asian Championships
| Silver medal – second place | 2022 Chuncheon | 49 kg |
Grand Prix
| Bronze medal – third place | 2023 Rome | 49 kg |
| Bronze medal – third place | 2023 Paris | 49 kg |
World U21 Championships
| Gold medal – first place | 2025 Nairobi | 53 kg |
World Junior Championships
| Gold medal – first place | 2022 Sofia | 49 kg |

Mobina Nematzadeh (Persian: مبینا نعمت‌زاده; born May 17, 2005) is an Iranian Taekwondo athlete. She won a bronze medal at the 2022 Asian Games in the women's 49 kg weight class. Nematzadeh won the Olympic quota in the Asian ghale hasankhan Olympic Qualification Tournament In Tai'an, China. She also won one of the bronze medals in the 49 kg event at the 2024 Summer Olympics held in Paris, France.

== Biography and early athletic career ==
Nematzadeh was born into a sports-oriented family. Her father, Abbas Nematzadeh, a former member of the national bodybuilding team, played a role in nurturing her passion for sports. Nematzadeh began practicing taekwondo at the age of six and quickly joined Tehran's junior team. One year later, competing against older opponents, she won the national championship. At the age of 10, she was invited to join the national team, a rare achievement in the sport of taekwondo.

== International achievements ==
Nematzadeh's first international success came in 2017 at the World Junior Taekwondo Championships in Vietnam, where she won a gold medal. In 2019, she secured two more gold medals at the Asian Junior Taekwondo Championships in Jordan and the World Championships in Uzbekistan, making her the most decorated junior taekwondo athlete in the world.

Her success continued in the youth category as well. In 2022, she won the gold medal at the Asian Youth Championships in Vietnam and another gold at the World Youth Championships in Bulgaria.

== Senior National Team debut ==
Due to her early talent and success, Nematzadeh was invited to join the senior national team, where she continued to achieve significant success despite her young age. In 2022, she won a silver medal at the Asian Championships in South Korea and a gold medal at the Asian Club Championships in Tehran. Additionally, she earned a bronze medal at the 2022 Asian Games in Hangzhou. Other notable achievements include a gold and a bronze at the World Taekwondo President's Cup, and two bronze medals at the Grand Prix events in France and Italy.

== 2024 Paris Olympics ==
Nematzadeh made her Olympic debut at the 2024 Paris Olympics at the age of 19. In the first round, she defeated Michelle Tau from Lesotho, advancing to the quarterfinals. In this stage, she triumphed over Adriana Cerezo from Spain, who had won the silver medal at the 2020 Tokyo Olympics, to reach the semifinals.

In the semifinals, Nematzadeh faced Gu Qing from China, the 2022 World Championship silver medalist, and after a hard-fought match, she moved to the bronze medal match. There, she faced Donya Abutaleb from Saudi Arabia, the 2022 World Championship bronze medalist, and secured a victory, earning the Olympic bronze medal.

This bronze medal is the second Olympic medal in the history of Iranian women's sports after Kimia Alizadeh and marks a significant achievement for Mobina Nematzadeh and Iranian sports.
