= Dunya Abutaleb =

Saudi Arabian taekwondo competitor

- Born: Dunya Ali M. Abutaleb; 17 June 1997 (age 29)
- Nationality: Saudi Arabia
- Height: 176 cm (5 ft 9 in)
- Weight: 49 kg (108 lb; 7 st 10 lb)
- Division: 49 kg, 53 kg
- Style: Taekwondo

Dunya Abutaleb (Arabic: دنيا علي أبو طالب; born 17 June 1997) is a Saudi taekwondo competitor. She is the first Saudi woman to qualify for an Olympics on her own merit.

== Career ==
Talib's father introduced her to the Korean martial art of taekwondo at the age of eight, at a time when girls were not permitted to exercise in schools in Saudi Arabia. This sport was rare in Saudi Arabia, especially for girls. She trained at a private club with her brother until she was 13, when she was prohibited from participating due to her gender. Despite this setback, Talib continued her training at home with her brother's coach, until officially joining the Saudi Taekwondo Federation in 2015.

Talib competed in the Saudi Games and was one of four athletes representing Saudi Arabia at the 2022 World Taekwondo Championships in Guadalajara, Mexico. She was the only female athlete on the team. She competed in the 49 kg category under the coaching of Kurban Bogda from Russia. She earned third place in the flyweight category in Mexico, and also secured third place in her category at the 2022 Asian Taekwondo Championships.

In 2024, Talib was the first Saudi woman in history to qualify for an Olympic spot on merit alone, after passing through the Asian qualifiers. Previously, all female athletes from Saudi Arabia had been included as part of national quota allocations. This achievement was celebrated by Saudi Minister of Sport, Prince Abdulaziz bin Turki Al Faisal.

She competed at the 2024 Paris Olympics in the women's taekwondo -49 kg category. She defeated Israeli athlete Avishag Semberg in her first match. She was defeated by the gold medalist from the 2020 Olympics, Panipak Wongpattanakit, in the quarterfinals. She failed to win a medal after losing in the bronze medal match against the Iranian athlete, Mobina Nematzadeh.
