= Yangjiang =

Yangjiang 阳江市 Yeungkong
- Prefecture-level city
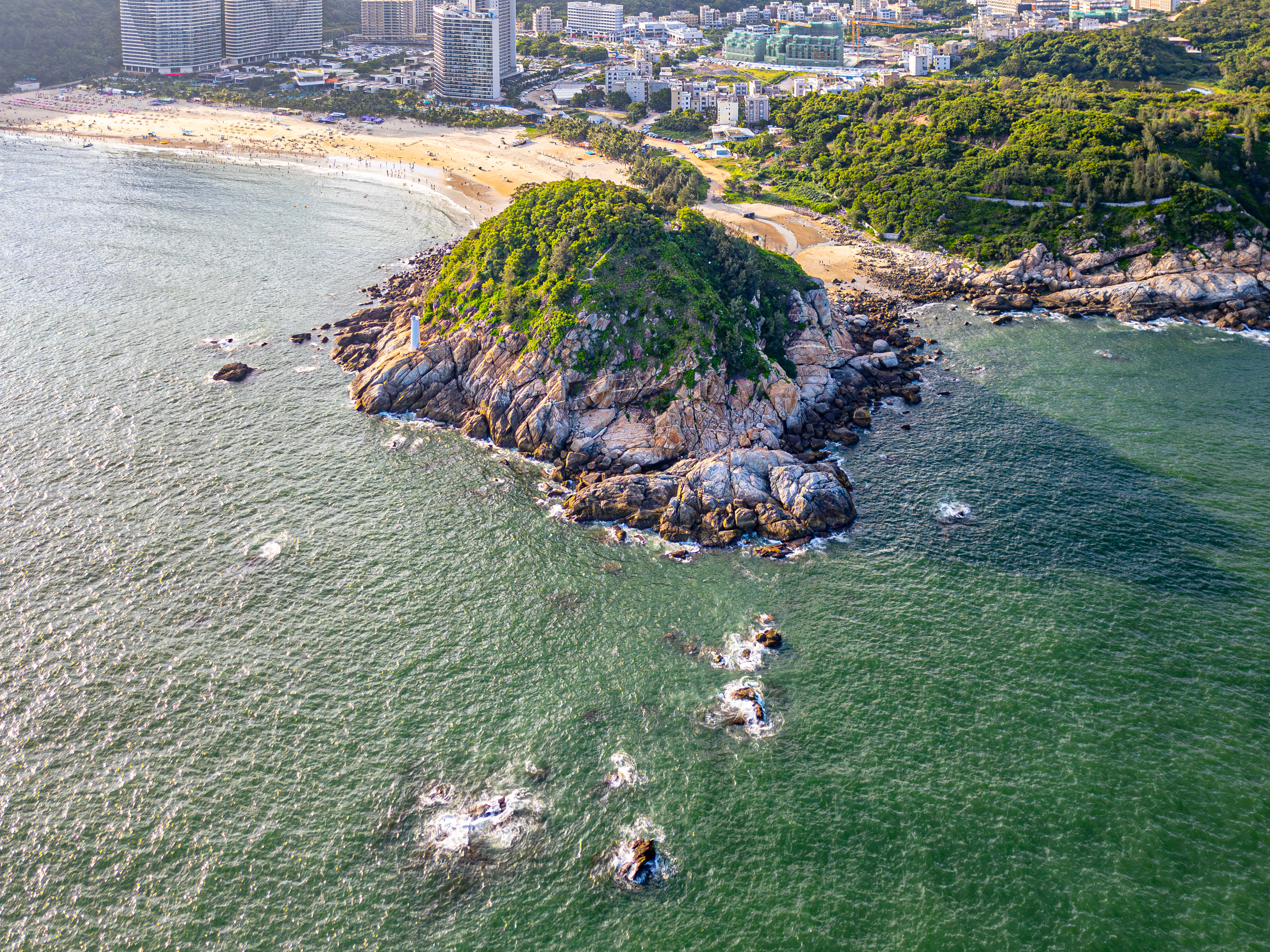
- Hailing Island in Yangjiang

- Location of Yangjiang City jurisdiction in Guangdong

- Location in China
- Coordinates (Yangjiang municipal government): 21°51′25″N 111°58′59″E
- Country: People's Republic of China
- Province: Guangdong
- County-level divisions: 4
- Municipal seat: Jiangcheng District

Government
  - CPC Secretary: Yu Haiping (于海平)
  - Mayor: Yu Jinfu (余金富) (Suspended)

Area
  - Prefecture-level city: 7,955.27 km^{2} (3,071.55 sq mi)
  - Urban: 2,482.5 km^{2} (958.5 sq mi)
  - Metro: 2,482.5 km^{2} (958.5 sq mi)
- Elevation: 4 m (13 ft)

Population (2020 census)
  - Prefecture-level city: 2,602,959
  - Density: 327.199/km^{2} (847.442/sq mi)
  - Urban: 1,292,987
  - Urban density: 520.84/km^{2} (1,349.0/sq mi)
  - Metro: 1,292,987
  - Metro density: 520.84/km^{2} (1,349.0/sq mi)

GDP
  - Prefecture-level city: CN¥ 151.6 billion US$ 23.5 billion
  - Per capita: CN¥ 58,005; US$ 8,991
- Time zone: UTC+8 (China Standard)
- Postal code: 529500 (Urban center) 529600, 529800, 529900 (Other areas)
- Area code: 0662
- ISO 3166 code: CN-GD-17
- License Plate: 粤Q
- Major Nationalities: Han

Yangjiang
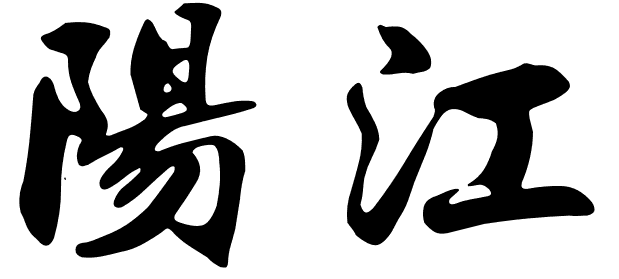
- "Yangjiang", as written in Chinese calligraphy
- Simplified Chinese: 阳江
- Traditional Chinese: 陽江
- Hanyu Pinyin: Yángjiāng
- Cantonese Yale: Yèuhnggōng
- Postal: Yeungkong
Transcriptions
Standard Mandarin
- Hanyu Pinyin: Yángjiāng
- Gwoyeu Romatzyh: Yangjiang
- Wade–Giles: Yang^{2}-chiang^{1}
- IPA: [jǎŋ.tɕjáŋ]
Yue: Cantonese
- Yale Romanization: Yèuhnggōng
- Jyutping: Joeng4gong1
- IPA: [jœŋ˩.kɔŋ˥]

Yangjiang (simplified Chinese: 阳江; traditional Chinese: 陽江), (Note: Yangjiang has also been romanized via Mandarin as Yang-keang and Yang-kiang.) alternately romanized via Cantonese as Yeungkong, is a prefecture-level city in southwestern Guangdong Province in the People's Republic of China. It borders Maoming to the west, Yunfu to the north, Jiangmen to the east, and looks out to the South China Sea to the south. The local dialect is the Gaoyang dialect, a branch of Yue Chinese. During the 2020 census, its population was 2,602,959 inhabitants of whom 1,292,987 lived in the built-up (or metro) and largely urbanized area comprising Jiangcheng District and Yangdong District.

== History ==
Under the Qing, Yangjiang County made up part of the commandery of Zhaoqing. It was later split off as a separate prefecture in its own right.

== Administration ==
The prefecture-level city of Yangjiang administers 4 county-level divisions, including 2 districts, 1 county-level city and 1 counties.

Map
Name	Simplified Chinese	Hanyu Pinyin	Population (2010 census)	Area (km^{2})	Density (/km^{2})
Jiangcheng District	江城区	Jiāngchéng Qū	676,857	779,69	868
Yangdong District	阳东区	Yángdōng Qū	442,762	1,702.8	260
Yangxi County	阳西县	Yángxī Xiàn	452,625	1,435	315
Yangchun	阳春市	Yángchūn Shì	849,505	4,037.8	210

Yangjiang is located about 190 km (120 mi) from Guangzhou, about 2.5 hours by bus. Notable areas include Zhapo Beach and Hailing Island near Shapa Town.

== Economy and culture ==
Yangjiang is the base of Yangjiang Shibazi, a knife manufacturer.

The Yangjiang Group artist collective is based in the city, and its members' work is largely inspired by the locality.

Yangjiang is home to six nuclear reactors, the largest nuclear power station in China.

== Geography ==
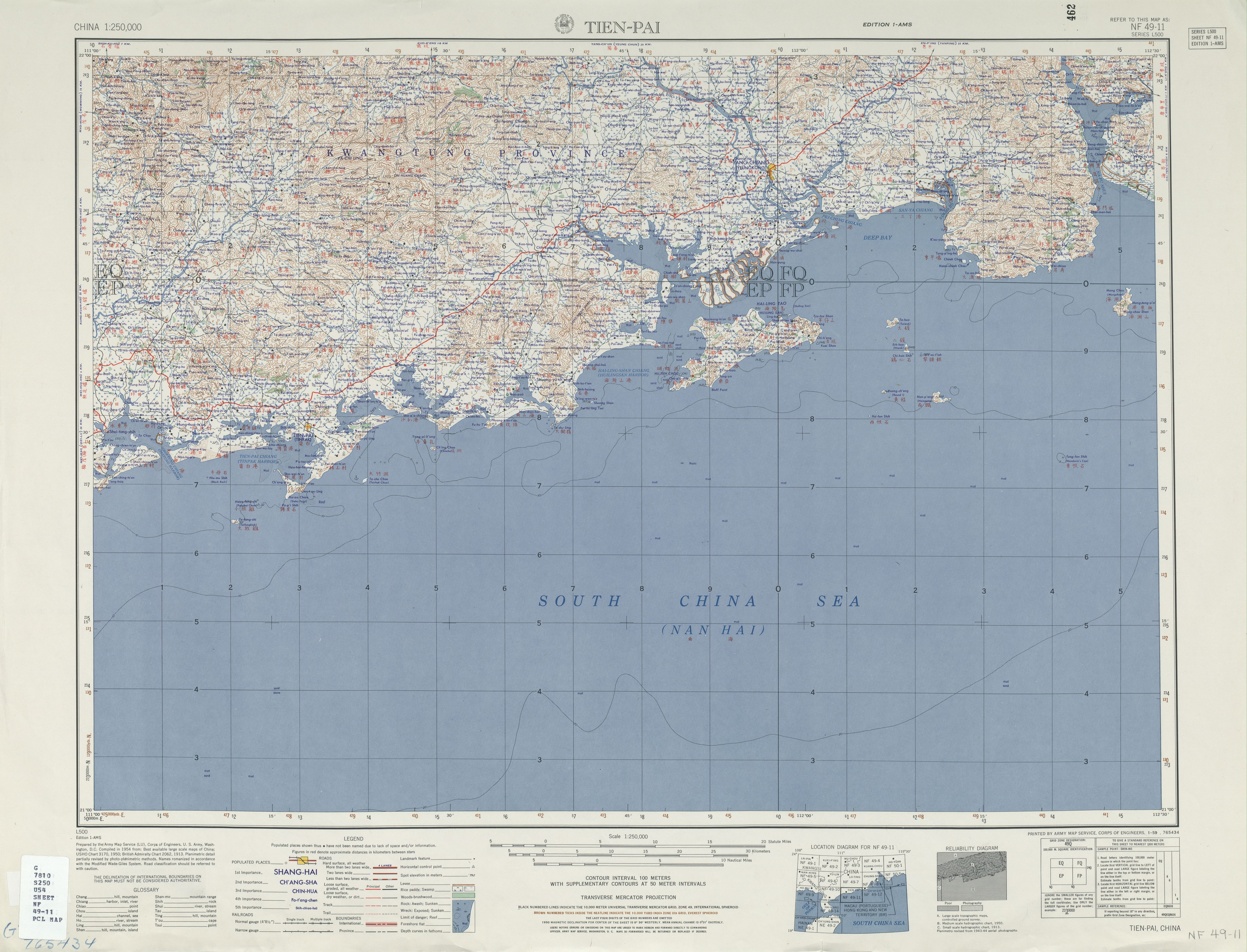
Yangjiang (labelled as YANG-CHIANG (YEUNGKONG) 陽江) (1954)

The city is named for the Moyang River.

The city was hit by a magnitude 5.9 earthquake on July 25, 1969 which killed over 3,000 people. The area is known for its relatively high levels of natural background radiation.

== Climate ==
Yangjiang has a monsoon-influenced humid subtropical climate (Köppen Cwa), with mild to warm winters and long, hot (but not especially so) summers, and very humid conditions year-round. Winter begins sunny and dry but becomes progressively wetter and cloudier. Spring is generally overcast, while summer brings the heaviest rains of the year though is much sunnier; there are 12.6 days with 50 mm (1.97 in) or more rainfall. Autumn is sunny and dry. The monthly 24-hour average temperature ranges from 15.5 °C (59.9 °F) in January to 28.3 °C (82.9 °F) in July, and the annual mean is 22.74 °C (72.9 °F). The annual rainfall is around 2,221 mm (87 in), close to two-thirds of which occurs from May to August. With monthly percent possible sunshine ranging from 18% in March to 55% in October, the city receives 1,757 hours of bright sunshine annually.

Climate data for Yangjiang, elevation 90 m (300 ft), (1991–2020 normals, extremes 1952–present)
Month	Jan	Feb	Mar	Apr	May	Jun	Jul	Aug	Sep	Oct	Nov	Dec	Year
Record high °C (°F)	28.8 (83.8)	31.0 (87.8)	32.8 (91.0)	33.9 (93.0)	37.0 (98.6)	37.2 (99.0)	38.3 (100.9)	37.5 (99.5)	36.8 (98.2)	34.6 (94.3)	33.1 (91.6)	29.4 (84.9)	38.3 (100.9)
Mean daily maximum °C (°F)	19.6 (67.3)	20.3 (68.5)	22.6 (72.7)	25.9 (78.6)	29.3 (84.7)	30.8 (87.4)	31.5 (88.7)	31.8 (89.2)	31.0 (87.8)	28.9 (84.0)	25.5 (77.9)	21.4 (70.5)	26.6 (79.8)
Daily mean °C (°F)	15.4 (59.7)	16.5 (61.7)	19.2 (66.6)	22.9 (73.2)	26.2 (79.2)	27.9 (82.2)	28.2 (82.8)	28.1 (82.6)	27.2 (81.0)	24.9 (76.8)	21.2 (70.2)	17.0 (62.6)	22.9 (73.2)
Mean daily minimum °C (°F)	12.5 (54.5)	14.1 (57.4)	16.9 (62.4)	20.8 (69.4)	23.9 (75.0)	25.6 (78.1)	25.9 (78.6)	25.6 (78.1)	24.6 (76.3)	21.9 (71.4)	18.1 (64.6)	13.9 (57.0)	20.3 (68.6)
Record low °C (°F)	−1.4 (29.5)	2.2 (36.0)	4.7 (40.5)	9.9 (49.8)	15.3 (59.5)	19.3 (66.7)	21.1 (70.0)	20.6 (69.1)	16.8 (62.2)	9.4 (48.9)	4.6 (40.3)	2.2 (36.0)	−1.4 (29.5)
Average precipitation mm (inches)	44.2 (1.74)	49.2 (1.94)	83.3 (3.28)	201.3 (7.93)	393.4 (15.49)	467.8 (18.42)	372.7 (14.67)	383.1 (15.08)	264.5 (10.41)	85.0 (3.35)	43.2 (1.70)	37.1 (1.46)	2,424.8 (95.47)
Average precipitation days (≥ 0.1 mm)	7.1	10.3	13.8	14.4	17.0	19.2	18.1	18.4	14.2	5.9	5.0	5.1	148.5
Average relative humidity (%)	73	80	85	87	85	86	84	84	81	72	70	67	80
Mean monthly sunshine hours	120.7	84.3	67.0	86.5	140.7	161.7	202.5	185.0	178.6	197.7	170.1	152.6	1,747.4
Percentage possible sunshine	36	26	18	23	35	40	49	47	49	55	51	46	40
Source: China Meteorological Administration Extremes
