= Street League Skateboarding =

International skateboarding event hosted several times annually for men and women

SLS Nike SB World Tour
- Sport: Skateboarding
- Founded: 2010
- Founder: Rob Dyrdek and Brian Atlas
- Country: United States
- Website: https://www.streetleague.com/

Street League Skateboarding (SLS) is an international skateboarding tournament series. The league features professional street skateboarders competing for the largest monetary prize in the history of skateboarding, and was founded by professional skateboarder and entrepreneur Rob Dyrdek. California Skateparks designs and builds the SLS courses.

== History ==
The idea for SLS first arose when Rob Dyrdek was dissatisfied with the state of professional street skateboarding competitions. Seeking to address the flaws of the existing system, Dyrdek developed the SLS. During its launch in 2010, Dyrdek said: "It has been a dream of mine to create a professional tour that bridges the gap between true street skateboarding and contest skating, which to date has been fragmented and misguided."

The inaugural year of SLS featured a four-stop arena tour that began at the Jobing.com Arena in Glendale, Arizona on August 28, 2010. The other venues for the inaugural tour were the Citizens Business Bank Arena in Ontario, California, on September 11, 2010, and the Thomas & Mack Center in Las Vegas, Nevada, on September 25, 2010.

The 2011 Super Crown World Champion was Sean Malto, who upset Nyjah Huston for his first Street League win and the US$200,000 first place prize. Huston went on to win the competition in 2012, in addition to a championship watch and ring set from Nixon Watches, and a Chevy Sonic vehicle.

In May 2013, the GoPro camera company was announced as the official camera sponsor of the 2013 SLS international tour. GoPro, which sponsors SLS contestants Ryan Sheckler and Malto, was used to feature the broadcasts of the domestic American events, including course previews and real-time impact highlights. As of May 19, 2013, Huston had won more prize money than any other skateboarder in history.

The 2013 Super Crown World Champion, Chris Cole, also earned his first career SLS win earlier in 2013 at the Street League at X Games stop in Munich, Germany. Huston and Luan Oliveira placed second and third respectively. Paul Rodriguez won his second SLS stop in Portland, Oregon, in July 2013.

In March 2014, SLS signed a broadcasting deal with Fox Sports 1.

In 2018, SLS announced a partnership with World Skate, under which it became the body's official world tour series and world championship through 2020. The SLS World Tour also became the main qualifying path for skateboarding at the 2020 Summer Olympics. The move was criticized by Tim McFerran, president of the World Skateboarding Grand Prix (who had been attempting to negotiate his own body, the World Skateboarding Federation, as the sanctioning body for Olympic skateboarding), citing the invitational nature of the events, and concerns that they would hold a near-monopoly over professional skateboarding and the athletes who compete at the Olympics.

In May 2019, it was announced that skateboarding would be dropped from the 2019 Pan American Games, with Panam Sports citing SLS and World Skate's decision to schedule a World Tour event in direct conflict with the Games schedule, and not have the Pan American Games be a qualifying event for the Olympics. Panam Sports argued that these decisions diminished the quality of the field, and showed a "lack of respect" on behalf of the entities.

In 2020, SLS merged with Nitro Circus and Superjacket Productions to form Thrill One Sports and Entertainment with the Raine Group. It was in turn acquired by Lorenzo Fertitta's Fiume Capital and Juggernaut Capital Partners, with co-investment from Dana White. In 2023, as a consequence of the acquisition, broadcasts of SLS events moved to alt-tech video platform Rumble in 2023. In recent years SLS has expanded their competition circuit adding spot takeovers in 2025. They will host 3 arena competitions along with 5 spot takeovers, and end the season with the Supercrown competition hosted in Sao Paulo Brazil.

== Overview ==
The SLS contestants accumulate points at each pre-championship stop and only the top eight ranking contestants compete in the championship event. In the 2023 season, SLS adopted a new format featuring a single-elimination format during finals in order to help build rivalries.

The SLS prize purse is the largest in the history of competitive professional skateboarding, and was worth US$1.6 million in 2011.

== SLSF and SLSCSP ==
In 2013, the Street League Skateboarding Foundation (SLSF) was established with the goal of increasing global participation in skateboarding. The Foundation assists municipalities and non-profits with the design, development, and construction of legal Skate Plazas, as well as assisting with the creation of community and educational programs that promote skateboarding.

An extension of SLS, "Street League Skateboarding Certified Skate Parks" (SLSCSP) built three plazas in 2013. The plazas will eventually become the locations for SLS amateur and televised qualifier contests. Locations include Erie, Colorado; the Kennesaw Skatepark in Kennesaw, Georgia; and Lake Havasu City, Arizona.

== 2026 SLS World tour ==
=== SLS Championship Takeover, Men's: Los Angeles, USA ===
April 4 2026.

Rank	Skater	Score
First place	Juni Kang	27.5
Second place	Jagger Eaton	27.0
Third place	Toa Sasaki	26.2
4th	Nyjah Huston	17.8
5th	Alex Midler	16.6
6th	Gustavo Ribeiro	16.1
7th	Aurélien Giraud	15.8
8th	Dashawn Jordan	7.8
9th	Antwuan Dixon	6.3

=== SLS Championship Takeover, Women's: Los Angeles, USA ===
April 4 2026.

Rank	Skater	Score
First place	Chloe Covell	22.9
Second place	Daniela Terol	19.1
Third place	Paige Heyn	18.2
4th	Margielyn Didal	10.8
5th	Shiloh Catori	7.7

=== SLS Championship Tour, Men's: Sydney, AUS ===
February 15, 2026.

Rank	Skater	Score
First place	Ginwoo Onodera	37.3
Second place	Julian Agliardi	35.5
Third place	Giovanni Vianna	34.7
4th	Angelo Caro	30.6
5th	Sora Shirai	18.8
6th	Nyjah Huston	17.1

=== SLS Championship Tour, Women's: Sydney, AUS ===
February 15, 2026.

Rank	Skater	Score
First place	Rayssa Leal	30.1
Second place	Liz Akama	29.2
Third place	Chloe Covell	24.7
4th	Coco Yoshizawa	23.2
5th	Momiji Nishiya	14.3
6th	Funa Nakayama	4.5

== 2025 SLS World tour ==
=== SLS Super Crown World Championship, Men's: São Paulo, BRA ===
December 6-7, 2025.

Rank	Skater	Score
First place	Ginwoo Onodera	37.3
Second place	Sora Shirai	36.6
Third place	Nyjah Huston	27.5
4th	Angelo Caro	25.4
5th	Kairi Netsuke	18.3
6th	Giovanni Vianna	16.3

=== SLS Super Crown World Championship, Women's: São Paulo, BRA ===
December 6-7, 2025.

Rank	Skater	Score
First place	Rayssa Leal	32.6
Second place	Liz Akama	26.4
Third place	Chloe Covell	25.3
4th	Yumeka Oda	24.2
5th	Funa Nakayama	10.5
6th	Coco Yoshizawa	10.3

=== SLS Championship Tour, Men's: Las Vegas, NV, USA ===
October 25, 2025.

Rank	Skater	Score
First place	Ginwoo Onodera	28.0
Second place	Nyjah Huston	26.7
Third place	Vincent Milou	26.4
4th	Ryan Decenzo	22.1
5th	Sora Shirai	18.6
6th	Jake Ilardi	16.9
7th	Louie Lopez	15.8
8th	Yuto Horigome	8.7

=== SLS Championship Tour, Women's: Las Vegas, NV, USA ===
October 25, 2025.

Rank	Skater	Score
First place	Liz Akama	22.0
Second place	Rayssa Leal	21.8
Third place	Aoi Uemura	19.2
4th	Momiji Nishiya	17.7
5th	Shiloh Catori	10.6
6th	Mariah Duran	9.4

=== SLS Championship Tour, Men's: Paris, FRA ===
October 11, 2025.

Rank	Skater	Score
First place	Vincent Milou	36.1
Second place	Giovanni Vianna	34.8
Third place	Sora Shirai	27.6
4th	Nyjah Huston	27.2
5th	Gustavo Ribeiro	17.8
6th	Yuto Horigome	3.0

=== SLS Championship Tour, Women's: Paris, FRA ===
October 11, 2025.

Rank	Skater	Score
First place	Aoi Uemura	29.8
Second place	Chloe Covell	22.3
Third place	Yumeka Oda	21.1
4th	Coco Yoshizawa	20.6
5th	Keet Oldenbeuving	14.8
6th	Funa Nakayama	8.7

=== SLS Championship Tour, Men's: Cleveland, OH, USA ===
August 9, 2025.

Rank	Skater	Score
First place	Cordano Russell	26.2
Second place	Carlos Ribeiro	25.0
Third place	Jhancarlos González	24.9
4th	Miles Silvas	24.6
5th	Gustavo Ribeiro	17.7
6th	Jamie Foy	15.7
7th	Julian Agliardi	15.5
8th	Ginwoo Onodera	13.4

=== SLS Championship Tour, Women's: Cleveland, OH, USA ===
August 9, 2025.

Rank	Skater	Score
First place	Chloe Covell	21.1
Second place	Coco Yoshizawa	20.9
Third place	Yumeka Oda	20.5
4th	Funa Nakayama	17.0

=== SLS Championship Tour, Men's: Brasília, BRA ===
July 13, 2025.

Rank	Skater	Score
First place	Felipe Gustavo	27.1
Second place	Giovanni Vianna	27.0
Third place	Gabryel Aguilar	24.8
4th	Filipe Mota	17.9
5th	Lucas Rabelo	17.0
6th	Ivan Monteiro	16.8
7th	Matheus Mendes	15.2
8th	Luan Oliveira	8.2
9th	Dominick Walker	7.7

=== SLS Championship Tour, Women's: Brasília, BRA ===
July 13, 2025.

Rank	Skater	Score
First place	Rayssa Leal	21.8
Second place	Gabriella Mazetto	14.0
Third place	Duda Ribeiro	13.7
4th	Isabelly Avila	12.7
5th	Margielyn Didal	9.6
6th	Marina Gabriela	7.3

=== SLS Championship Tour, Men's: Santa Monica, CA, USA ===
May 23, 2025.

Rank	Skater	Score
First place	Chris Joslin	27.2
Second place	Shane O'Neill	26.3
Third place	Angelo Caro	26.2
4th	Cordano Russell	25.7
5th	Dashawn Jordan	18.5
6th	Braden Hoban	16.7
7th	Alex Midler	16.7
8th	Julian Agliardi	13.8
9th	Louie Lopez	7.3

=== SLS Championship Tour, Women's: Santa Monica, CA, USA ===
May 23, 2025.

Rank	Skater	Score
First place	Chloe Covell	23.8
Second place	Aoi Uemura	19.3
Third place	Margielyn Didal	10.9
4th	Miyu Ito	7.8
5th	Paige Heyn	7.8

=== SLS Championship Tour, Men's: Miami, FL, USA ===
May 3, 2025.

Rank	Skater	Score
First place	Nyjah Huston	36.8
Second place	Gustavo Ribeiro	36.7
Third place	Felipe Gustavo	36.5
4th	Sora Shirai	27.2
5th	Giovanni Vianna	27.2
6th	Kairi Netsuke	18.2

=== SLS Championship Tour, Women's: Miami, FL, USA ===
May 3, 2025.

Rank	Skater	Score
First place	Rayssa Leal	32.1
Second place	Chloe Covell	24.0
Third place	Coco Yoshizawa	22.7
4th	Momiji Nishiya	15.3
5th	Yumeka Oda	13.5
6th	Funa Nakayama	5.8

== 2024 SLS World tour ==
=== SLS Super Crown World Championship, Men's: São Paulo, BRA ===
December 14-15, 2024.

Rank	Skater	Score
First place	Nyjah Huston	36.8
Second place	Giovanni Vianna	36.2
Third place	Gustavo Ribeiro	35.4
4th	Chris Joslin	26.2
5th	Felipe Gustavo	25.2
6th	Jhancarlos González	8.8

=== SLS Super Crown World Championship, Women's: São Paulo, BRA ===
December 14-15, 2024.

Rank	Skater	Score
First place	Rayssa Leal	35.4
Second place	Coco Yoshizawa	35.2
Third place	Yumeka Oda	33.7
4th	Chloe Covell	32.9
5th	Liz Akama	23.2
6th	Momiji Nishiya	22.2

=== SLS Championship Tour, Men's: Tokyo, JPN ===
November 23, 2024.

Rank	Skater	Score
First place	Sora Shirai	36.8
Second place	Yuto Horigome	36.3
Third place	Chris Joslin	36.2
4th	Alex Midler	34.3
5th	Ryan Decenzo	25.7
6th	Felipe Gustavo	7.7

=== SLS Championship Tour, Women's: Tokyo, JPN ===
November 23, 2024.

Rank	Skater	Score
First place	Rayssa Leal	30.7
Second place	Liz Akama	30.1
Third place	Coco Yoshizawa	29.4
4th	Chloe Covell	27.8
5th	Aoi Uemura	20.5
6th	Yumeka Oda	13.1

=== SLS Championship Tour, Men's: Sydney, AUS ===
October 13, 2024.

Rank	Skater	Score
First place	Sora Shirai	36.7
Second place	Giovanni Vianna	35.9
Third place	Chris Joslin	35.8
4th	Jhancarlos González	31.8
5th	Tommy Fynn	13.9
6th	Nyjah Huston	7.2

=== SLS Championship Tour, Women's: Sydney, AUS ===
October 13, 2024.

Rank	Skater	Score
First place	Chloe Covell	31.8
Second place	Liz Akama	29.1
Third place	Funa Nakayama	27.4
4th	Rayssa Leal	23.8
5th	Momiji Nishiya	19.7
6th	Aoi Uemura	5.8

=== SLS Championship Tour APEX 03, Men's: Vista, CA, USA ===
August 31, 2024.

Rank	Skater	Score
First place	Kairi Netsuke	26.2
Second place	Felipe Gustavo	25.3
Third place	Jamie Foy	25.3
4th	Braden Hoban	17.4
5th	Filipe Mota	15.0
6th	Vincent Milou	8.9
7th	Carlos Ribeiro	0.0

=== SLS Championship Tour APEX 03, Women's: Vista, CA, USA ===
August 31, 2024.

Rank	Skater	Score
First place	Yumeka Oda	24.5
Second place	Paige Heyn	23.0
Third place	Funa Nakayama	23.0
4th	Aoi Uemura	22.5
5th	Pamela Rosa	19.8
6th	Poe Pinson	11.5
7th	Shiloh Catori	10.7

=== SLS Championship Tour APEX 02, Men's: Las Vegas, NV, USA ===
May 25, 2024.

Rank	Skater	Score
First place	Nyjah Huston	27.1
Second place	Chris Joslin	25.6
Third place	Louie Lopez	24.2
4th	Lucas Rabelo	23.5
5th	Daiki Ikeda	23.3
6th	Antonio Durao	17.8
7th	Dashawn Jordan	17.4
8th	Yuto Horigome	8.5

=== SLS Championship Tour APEX 02, Women's: Las Vegas, NV, USA ===
May 25, 2024.

Rank	Skater	Score
First place	Nanaka Fujisawa	17.7
Second place	Aoi Uemura	16.8
Third place	Shiloh Catori	13.8
4th	Paige Heyn	11.5
5th	Kylie Frank	11.3
6th	Christine Cottam	8.4

=== SLS Championship Tour, Men's: San Diego, CA, USA ===
April 20, 2024.

Rank	Skater	Score
First place	Braden Hoban	35.5
Second place	Giovanni Vianna	33.4
Third place	Gustavo Ribeiro	27.0
4th	Kelvin Hoefler	26.9
5th	Felipe Gustavo	26.1
6th	Chris Joslin	24.7

=== SLS Championship Tour, Women's: San Diego, CA, USA ===
April 20, 2024.

Rank	Skater	Score
First place	Rayssa Leal	33.9
Second place	Chloe Covell	29.8
Third place	Momiji Nishiya	23.0
4th	Funa Nakayama	21.6
5th	Yumeka Oda	14.8
6th	Liz Akama	14.0

=== SLS Championship Tour APEX 01, Men's: Las Vegas, NV, USA ===
March 30, 2024.

Rank	Skater	Score
First place	Yuto Horigome	27.5
Second place	Alex Midler	27.3
Third place	Felipe Gustavo	27.3
4th	Giovanni Vianna	27.2
5th	Gustavo Ribeiro	26.4
6th	Ryan Decenzo	17.7
7th	Filipe Mota	17.6
8th	Braden Hoban	17.5

=== SLS Championship Tour APEX 01, Women's: Las Vegas, NV, USA ===
March 30, 2024.

Rank	Skater	Score
First place	Liz Akama	17.2
Second place	Wenhui Zeng	16.4
Third place	Poe Pinson	13.4
4th	Roos Zwetsloot	13.0
5th	Shiloh Catori	6.9
6th	Mariah Duran	5.0

=== SLS Championship Tour, Men's: Paris, FRA ===
February 24, 2024.

Rank	Skater	Score
First place	Aurelien Giraud	36.4
Second place	Gustavo Ribeiro	27.2
Third place	Nyjah Huston	27.1
4th	Giovanni Vianna	26.8
5th	Sora Shirai	22.8
6th	Vincent Milou	16.6

=== SLS Championship Tour, Women's: Paris, FRA ===
February 24, 2024.

Rank	Skater	Score
First place	Chloe Covell	32.2
Second place	Rayssa Leal	31.2
Third place	Yumeka Oda	30.2
4th	Liz Akama	23.9
5th	Momiji Nishiya	22.9
6th	Funa Nakayama	14.8

== 2023 SLS World tour ==
=== SLS Super Crown World Championship, Men's: São Paulo, BRA ===
December 2-3, 2023.

Rank	Skater	Score
First place	Giovanni Vianna	36.4
Second place	Vincent Milou	36.3
Third place	Gustavo Ribeiro	27.1
4th	Felipe Gustavo	25.5
5th	Ryan Decenzo	25.0
6th	Maurio McCoy	7.0

=== SLS Super Crown World Championship, Women's: São Paulo, BRA ===
December 2-3, 2023.

Rank	Skater	Score
First place	Rayssa Leal	31.9
Second place	Momiji Nishiya	30.6
Third place	Paige Heyn	28.8
4th	Aoi Uemura	27.9
5th	Yumeka Oda	20.7
6th	Chloe Covell	20.4

=== SLS Championship Tour, Men's: Sydney, AUS ===
October 7, 2023.

Rank	Skater	Score
First place	Felipe Gustavo	35.4
Second place	Dashawn Jordan	35.0
Third place	Nyjah Huston	27.1
4th	Lucas Rabelo	23.8
5th	Yuto Horigome	18.6
6th	Kairi Netsuke	9.4

=== SLS Championship Tour, Women's: Sydney, AUS ===
October 7, 2023.

Rank	Skater	Score
First place	Chloe Covell	33.4
Second place	Rayssa Leal	31.8
Third place	Momiji Nishiya	19.7
4th	Paige Heyn	17.3
5th	Roos Zwetsloot	16.0
6th	Pamela Rosa	15.9

=== SLS Championship Tour, Men's: Tokyo, JPN ===
August 12, 2023.

Rank	Skater	Score
First place	Yuto Horigome	37.2
Second place	Daiki Ikeda	34.0
Third place	Nyjah Huston	26.8
4th	Jamie Foy	23.5
5th	Kelvin Hoefler	8.6
6th	Tommy Fynn	6.3

=== SLS Championship Tour, Women's: Tokyo, JPN ===
August 12, 2023.

Rank	Skater	Score
First place	Chloe Covell	32.5
Second place	Momiji Nishiya	31.2
Third place	Roos Zwetsloot	26.4
4th	Rayssa Leal	22.6
5th	Yumeka Oda	12.1
6th	Funa Nakayama	11.1

=== SLS Championship Tour, Men's: Chicago, IL, USA ===
April 29, 2023.

Rank	Skater	Score
First place	Kelvin Hoefler	35.7
Second place	Ryan Decenzo	35.1
Third place	Nyjah Huston	34.2
4th	Jagger Eaton	17.8
5th	Felipe Gustavo	16.7
6th	Gustavo Ribeiro	14.8

=== SLS Championship Tour, Women's: Chicago, IL, USA ===
April 29, 2023.

Rank	Skater	Score
First place	Rayssa Leal	31.4
Second place	Momiji Nishiya	28.3
Third place	Roos Zwetsloot	25.8
4th	Funa Nakayama	20.3
5th	Yumeka Oda	16.2
6th	Chloe Covell	8.6

== 2022 SLS World tour ==
=== SLS Super Crown World Championship, Men's: Rio de Janeiro, BRA ===
November 5-6, 2022.

Rank	Skater	Score
First place	Gustavo Ribeiro	27.9
Second place	Braden Hoban	27.7
Third place	Chris Joslin	27.2
4th	Ryan Decenzo	27.1
5th	Vincent Milou	25.4
6th	Felipe Gustavo	24.5
7th	Yuto Horigome	8.1
8th	Jagger Eaton	6.0

=== SLS Super Crown World Championship, Women's: Rio de Janeiro, BRA ===
November 5-6, 2022.

Rank	Skater	Score
First place	Rayssa Leal	21.1
Second place	Funa Nakayama	20.8
Third place	Momiji Nishiya	19.2
4th	Poe Pinson	16.7
5th	Pamela Rosa	16.0
6th	Wenhui Zeng	15.2
7th	Gabriela Mazetto	7.7
8th	Yumeka Oda	4.9

=== SLS Championship Tour, Men's: Las Vegas, NV, USA ===
October 8-9, 2022.

Rank	Skater	Score
First place	Gustavo Ribeiro	26.9
Second place	Chris Joslin	26.6
Third place	Braden Hoban	26.2
4th	Kelvin Hoefler	24.9
5th	Jagger Eaton	23.1
6th	Tommy Fynn	19.4
7th	Felipe Gustavo	16.0
8th	Micky Papa	14.6

=== SLS Championship Tour, Women's: Las Vegas, NV, USA ===
October 8-9, 2022.

Rank	Skater	Score
First place	Rayssa Leal	20.1
Second place	Chloe Covell	18.8
Third place	Poe Pinson	17.5
4th	Pamela Rosa	17.5
5th	Yumeka Oda	12.3
6th	Momiji Nishiya	11.2
7th	Gabriela Mazetto	9.6
8th	Funa Nakayama	6.3

=== SLS Championship Tour, Men's: Seattle, WA, USA ===
August 13-14, 2022.

Rank	Skater	Score
First place	Yuto Horigome	27.6
Second place	Vincent Milou	27.5
Third place	Chris Joslin	26.6
4th	Ryan Decenzo	26.5
5th	Braden Hoban	25.8
6th	Dashawn Jordan	25.7
7th	Gustavo Ribeiro	17.5
8th	Sora Shirai	14.0

=== SLS Championship Tour, Women's: Seattle, WA, USA ===
August 13-14, 2022.

Rank	Skater	Score
First place	Rayssa Leal	22.4
Second place	Pamela Rosa	21.4
Third place	Momiji Nishiya	21.0
4th	Yumeka Oda	19.8
5th	Poe Pinson	18.6
6th	Keet Oldenbeuving	12.6
7th	Funa Nakayama	12.0
8th	Roos Zwetsloot	8.5

=== SLS Championship Tour, Men's: Jacksonville, FL, USA ===
July 16-17, 2022.

Rank	Skater	Score
First place	Yuto Horigome	28.1
Second place	Sora Shirai	27.8
Third place	Gustavo Ribeiro	27.1
4th	Vincent Milou	23.7
5th	Nyjah Huston	18.3
6th	Dashawn Jordan	17.8
7th	Shane O'Neill	16.0
8th	Felipe Gustavo	8.9

=== SLS Championship Tour, Women's: Jacksonville, FL, USA ===
July 16-17, 2022.

Rank	Skater	Score
First place	Rayssa Leal	23.2
Second place	Yumeka Oda	23.0
Third place	Pamela Rosa	17.6
4th	Momiji Nishiya	17.5
5th	Roos Zwetsloot	17.1
6th	Poe Pinson	14.5
7th	Gabriela Mazetto	12.5
8th	Aori Nishimura	10.4

== 2021 SLS World tour ==
=== Street League Skateboarding Super Crown, Men's: Jacksonville, FL, USA ===
November 13-14, 2021.

Rank	Skater	Score
1st	Jagger Eaton	27.5
2nd	Lucas Rabelo	27.3
3rd	Gustavo Ribeiro	26.3
4th	Nyjah Huston	26.2
5th	Kelvin Hoefler	24.7
6th	Shane O'Neill	17.5
7th	Felipe Gustavo	13.3
8th	Alex Midler	13.1

=== Street League Skateboarding Super Crown, Women's : Jacksonville, FL, USA ===
November 13-14, 2021.

Rank	Skater	Score
1st	Pamela Rosa	21.8
2nd	Rayssa Leal	19.2
3rd	Momiji Nishiya	19.1
4th	Samarria Brevard	18.6
5th	Roos Zwetsloot	16.4
6th	Candy Jacobs	14.4
7th	Funa Nakayama	14
8th	Keet Oldenbeuving	13.4

=== Street League Skateboarding, Men's: Lake Havasu, AZ, USA ===
October 29-30 2021.

Rank	Skater	Score
1st	Nyjah Huston	27.3
2nd	Dashawn Jordan	26.8
3rd	Felipe Gustavo	26.3
4th	Jagger Eaton	25.3
5th	Micky Papa	24.0
6th	Alex Midler	23.7
7th	Lucas Rabelo	23.6
8th	Chris Joslin	4.5

=== Street League Skateboarding, Women's: Lake Havasu, AZ, USA ===
October 29-30 2021.

Rank	Skater	Score
1st	Rayssa Leal	19.2
2nd	Momiji Nishiya	18.5
3rd	Funa Nakayama	16.1
4th	Pamela Rosa	16.1
5th	Roos Zwetsloot	13.6
6th	Gabriela Mazetto	13.0
7th	Mariah Duran	12.0
8th	Keet Oldenbeuving	8.2

=== Street League World Tour, Women's: Salt Lake City, USA. ===
August 28 2021.

Rank	Skater
1st	Rayssa Leal
2nd	Funa Nakayama
3rd	Roos Zwetsloot
4th	Pamela Rosa
5th	Keet Oldenbeuving
6th	Mariah Duran
7th	Momiji Nishiya
8th	Candy Jacobs

=== Street League World Tour, Men's: Salt Lake City, USA. ===
Rank	Skater
1st	Gustavo Ribeiro
2nd	Nyjah Huston
3rd	Alex Midler
4th	Kelvin Hoefler
5th	Felipe Gustavo
6th	Jamie Foy
7th	Filipe Mota
8th	Chris Joslin

=== Street League Unsanctioned 2 ===
April 26 2021.

Rank	Skater
1st	Ishod Wair
2nd	Chris Joslin
3rd	Milton Martinez
4th	Elijah Berle
5th	Tom Asta
6th	Dashawn Jordan
7th	Louie Lopez
8th	Aurélien Giraud
9th	Taylor Kirby
10th	Mason Silva

== 2020 SLS World Tour ==
=== Street League Unsanctioned ===
December 28 2020.

Rank	Skater
1st	Dashawn Jordan
2nd	Jamie Foy
3rd	Manny Santiago
4th	Felipe Gustavo
5th	Torey Pudwill
6th	Carlos Ribeiro
7th	Matt Berger
8th	Paul Rodriguez
9th	Kelvin Hoefler
10th	Ishod Wair

== 2019 SLS World Tour ==
=== Street league world championships, Men's: Sao Paulo, Brazil ===
September 19-22 2019.

Rank	Skater
1st	Nyjah Huston
2nd	Yuto Horigome
3rd	Gustavo Ribeiro
4th	Kelvin Hoefler
5th	Jamie Foy
6th	Yukito Aoki
7th	Ángelo Caro
8th	Dashawn Jordan

=== Street league world championships, Women's: Sao Paulo, Brazil ===
September 19-22 2019.

Rank	Skater
1st	Pamela Rosa
2nd	Rayssa Leal
3rd	Aori Nishimura
4th	Candy Jacobs
5th	Mariah Duran
6th	Gabi Mazetto
7th	Alexis Sablone
8th	Yumeka Oda

=== World Skate Street league Pro tour, Men's: Los Angeles, USA ===
July 24-29 2019.

Rank	Skater
1st	Yuto Horigome
2nd	Maurio McCoy
3rd	Vincent Milou
4th	Giovanni Vianna
5th	Carlos Ribeiro
6th	Sora Shirai
7th	Kelvin Hoefler
8th	Nyjah Huston

=== World skate Street league pro tour, Women's: Los Angeles, USA ===
July 24-29 2019.

Rank	Skater
1st	Rayssa Leal
2nd	Pamela Rosa
3rd	Alana Smith
4th	Aori Nishimura
5th	Margielyn Didal
6th	Letícia Bufoni
7th	Alexis Sablone
8th	Yumeka Oda

=== Street league World skate, Men's: London, UK ===
May 25-26 2019.

Rank	Skater
1st	Nyjah Huston
2nd	Gustavo Ribeiro
3rd	Shane O'Neill
4th	Kelvin Hoefler
5th	Manny Santiago
6th	Matt Berger
7th	Sora Shirai
8th	Louie Lopez

=== Street league World Skate, Women's: London, UK ===
May 25-26 2019.

Rank	Skater
1st	Pamela Rosa
2nd	Hayley Wilson
3rd	Rayssa Leal
4th	Letícia Bufoni
5th	Aori Nishimura
6th	Funa Nakayama
7th	Candy Jacobs
8th	Alexis Sablone

=== Street league World Championships, Men's: Rio de Janeiro, Brazil ===
January 10-12 2019.

Rank	Skater
1st	Nyjah Huston
2nd	Kelvin Hoefler
3rd	Felipe Gustavo
4th	Aurélien Giraud
5th	Mark Suciu
6th	Ivan Monteiro
7th	Chris Joslin
8th	Yuto Horigome

=== Street league World Championships, Women's: Rio de Janeiro, Brazil ===
January 10-12 2019.

Rank	Skater
1st	Aori Nishimura
2nd	Letícia Bufoni
3rd	Leo Baker
4th	Mariah Duran
5th	Virginia Fortes Aguas
6th	Pamela Rosa
7th	Karen Feitosa
8th	Alexis Sablone

== 2018 SLS World Tour ==
=== Street league pro open, Men's: Huntington Beach, USA ===
December 16 2018.

Rank	Skater
1st	Yuto Horigome
2nd	Dashawn Jordan
3rd	Kelvin Hoefler
4th	Mark Suciu
5th	Chris Joslin
6th	Vincent Milou
7th	Nyjah Huston
8th	Shane O'Neill

=== Street league pro open, Men's: Los Angeles, USA ===
July 7 2018.

Rank	Skater
1st	Yuto Horigome
2nd	Chris Joslin
3rd	Kevin Hofeler
4th	Nyjah Huston
5th	Manny Santiago
6th	Tommy Fynn
7th	Felipe Gustavo
8th	Zion Wright

=== Street league pro open, Men's: London, UK ===
May 26-28 2018.

Rank	Skater
1st	Yuto Horigome
2nd	Vincent Milou
3rd	Kevin Hofeler
4th	Tiago Lemos
5th	Trent McClung
6th	Ivan Monteiro
7th	Gustavo Ribeiro
8th	Felipe Gustavo

=== Street league pro open, Women's: London, UK ===
May 27 2018

Rank	Skater
1st	Jenn Soto
2nd	Leo Baker
3rd	Mariah Duran
4th	Pamela Rosa
5th	Candy Jacobs
6th	Alexis Sablone
7th	Samarria Brevard
8th	Margielyn Didal

== 2017 SLS Nike SB World Tour ==
=== SLS Nike SB Pro Open: Barcelona, Spain ===
May 20–21, 2017.

Rank	Skater	Score
1st	Nyjah Huston	35.0
2nd	Shane O'Neill	34.7
3rd	Yuto Horigome	31.6
4th	Kelvin Hoefler	30.9
5th	Tiago Lemos	25.5
6th	Dashawn Jordan	18.9
7th	Matt Berger	17.8
8th	Felipe Gustavo	17.5

=== SLS Nike SB World Tour Stop One: Munich, Germany ===
June 24, 2017.

Rank	Skater	Score
1st	Nyjah Huston	36.1
2nd	Yuto Horigome	35.5
3rd	Carlos Ribeiro	34.2
4th	Chris Joslin	33.9
5th	Kelvin Hoefler	32.9
6th	Miles Silvas	32.1
7th	Dashawn Jordan	31.4
8th	Torey Pudwill	19.5

=== SLS Nike SB World Tour Stop Two: Chicago, Illinois ===
August 13, 2017.

Rank	Skater	Score
1st	Dashawn Jordan	33.8
2nd	Torey Pudwill	33.3
3rd	Shane O'Neill	33.0
4th	Nyjah Huston	32.7
5th	Tiago Lemos	26.8
6th	Tommy Fynn	24.3
7th	Ishod Wair	18.8
8th	Sean Malto	7.2

=== SLS Nike SB Super Crown World Championship: Los Angeles, California ===
September 15, 2017.

Rank	Skater	Score
1st	Nyjah Huston	37.0
2nd	Shane O'Neill	35.9
3rd	Kelvin Hoefler	35.4
4th	Louie Lopez	35.1
5th	Torey Pudwill	29.2
6th	Carlos Ribeiro	22.9
7th	Dashawn Jordan	20.9
8th	Tiago Lemos	15.0

== 2016 SLS Nike SB World Tour ==
=== SLS Nike SB Pro Open: Barcelona, Spain ===
May 21–22, 2016.

Rank	Skater	Score
1st	Shane O'Neill	34.8
2nd	Nyjah Huston	34.7
3rd	Cody McEntire	31.8
4th	Paul Rodriguez	31.0
5th	Luan Oliviera	29.9
6th	Ryan Decenzo	28.9
7th	Chaz Ortiz	28.4
8th	Chris Joslin	22.2

=== SLS Nike SB World Tour Stop One: Munich, Germany ===
July 2, 2016.

Rank	Skater	Score
1st	Paul Rodriguez	34.0
2nd	Luan Oliveira	32.7
3rd	Nyjah Huston	32.1
4th	Tom Asta	30.4
5th	Tiago Lemos	27.2
6th	Shane O'Neill	24.9
7th	Carlos Ribeiro	22.7
8th	Ryan Decenzo	21.1

=== SLS Nike SB World Tour Stop Two: Newark, New Jersey ===
August 28, 2016.

Rank	Skater	Score
1st	Nyjah Huston	36.0
2nd	Chris Joslin	34.1
3rd	Tommy Fynn	30.1
4th	Luan Oliveira	29.9
5th	Carlos Ribeiro	29.0
6th	Chris Cole	24.3
7th	Evan Smith	17.3
8th	Paul Rodriguez	14.5

=== SLS Nike SB Super Crown World Championship: Los Angeles, California ===
October 2, 2016.

Rank	Skater	Score
1st	Shane O'Neill	36.4
2nd	Nyjah Huston	34.6
3rd	Cody McEntire	34.4
4th	Luan Oliveira	33.5
5th	Paul Rodriguez	31.9
6th	Tom Asta	31.4
7th	Chris Joslin	27.7
8th	Ryan Decenzo	19.1

== 2015 SLS Nike SB World Tour ==
=== SLS Nike SB Pro Open: Barcelona, Spain ===
May 16–17, 2015.

Rank	Skater	Run	Best Trick	Score
1st	Nyjah Huston	8.5	17.1	34.2
2nd	Paul Rodriguez	7.9	25.9	33.8
3rd	Evan Smith	7.4	25.0	32.4
4th	Chaz Ortiz	8.3	24.0	32.3
5th	Tom Asta	7.2	24.5	31.7
6th	Manny Santiago	0.0	31.6	31.6
7th	Shane O'Neill	12.5	18.0	30.5
8th	Chris Cole	13.7	14.4	28.1

=== SLS Nike SB World Tour Stop One: Los Angeles, CA ===
July 11, 2015.

Rank	Skater	Run	Best Trick	Score
1st	Luan Oliveira	17.1	17.1	34.2
2nd	Nyjah Huston	8.4	25.6	34.0
3rd	Chaz Ortiz	17.1	16.0	33.1
4th	Cody McEntire	15.1	16.0	31.1
5th	Chris Cole	14.6	15.7	30.3
6th	Kelvin Hoefler	12.5	26.5	29.0
7th	Ryan Decenzo	12.4	15.9	28.3
8th	Evan Smith	13.7	7.8	21.5

=== SLS Nike SB World Tour Stop Two: Newark, NJ ===
August 23, 2015.

Rank	Skater	Run	Best Trick	Score
1st	Luan Oliveira	18.0	18.5	36.5
2nd	Nyjah Huston	17.9	17.8	35.7
3rd	Kelvin Hoefler	8.6	26.9	35.5
4th	Ryan Decenzo	5.3	25.8	31.1
5th	Chaz Ortiz	12.4	17.1	29.5
6th	Matt Berger	5.8	21.8	27.6
7th	Shane O'Neill	17.2	8.3	25.5
8th	Paul Rodriguez	7.5	8.2	15.7

=== SLS Nike SB Super Crown World Championship: Chicago, Illinois ===
October 4, 2015.

Rank	Skater	Run	Best Trick	Score
1st	Kelvin Hoefler	12.5	35.8	35.8
2nd	Nyjah Huston	16.8	27.1	35.7
3rd	Luan Oliveira	16.1	18.0	34.1
4th	Chaz Ortiz	16.0	24.7	33.3
5th	Shane O'Neill	15.1	17.4	32.5
6th	Chris Cole	14.6	16.5	31.1
7th	Cody McEntire	15.3	15.4	30.7
8th	Paul Rodriguez	12.9	0.0	12.9

Rank	Skater	Run	Best Trick	Score
1st	Leticia Bufoni	10.2	11.2	22.8
2nd	Vanessa Torres	7.3	13.1	20.4
3rd	Alana Smith	7.3	9.2	16.4
4th	Leo Baker	14.0	0	14.0
5th	Pamela Rosa	6.8	6.5	13.3
6th	Marisa Dal Santo	7.6	4.7	12.3
7th	Samarria Brevard	3.5	6.2	9.7
8th	Alexis Sablone	2.6	6.3	8.9

== 2014 SLS Nike SB World Tour ==
=== SLS Monster Energy Pro Open: Los Angeles, California ===
May 17–18, 2014.

Rank	Skater	Flow	Control	Impact	Score
1st	Nyjah Huston	8.9	36.3	9.4	54.6
2nd	Ishod Wair	9.2	34.5	8.3	52.0
3rd	Paul Rodriguez	8.9	32.9	9.3	51.1
4th	Shane O'Neill	8.2	33.7	9.1	51.0
5th	Torey Pudwill	7.3	33.6	8.9	49.8
6th	Luan Oliveira	7.3	17.8	8.0	33.1
7th	Chris Cole	7.6	-	7.4	15.0
8th	Matt Berger	3.4	-	-	3.4

=== SLS Nike SB World Tour Stop One: Chicago, Illinois ===
June 29, 2014.

Rank	Skater	Flow	Control	Impact	Score
1st	Nyjah Huston	8.9	34.6	8.9	52.4
2nd	Luan Oliveira	7.8	35.7	8.8	52.3
3rd	Shane O'Neill	8.2	32.6	9.8	50.6
4th	Torey Pudwill	7.5	32.7	8.3	48.5
5th	Bastien Salabanzi	6.3	22.5	9.3	38.1
6th	Paul Rodriguez	8.2	15.2	8.5	31.9
7th	Matt Berger	6.5	-	0	6.5
8th	Tommy Sandoval	6.2	-	-	6.2

=== SLS Nike SB World Tour Stop Two: Los Angeles, California ===
July 27, 2014.

Rank	Skater	Flow	Control	Impact	Score
1st	Nyjah Huston	8.3	34.1	8.6	51.0
2nd	Chaz Ortiz	8.1	33.0	8.1	49.2
3rd	Torey Pudwill	8.6	30.9	8.8	48.3
4th	Ryan Decenzo	8.6	24.5	7.5	40.6
5th	Luan Oliveira	8.0	19.1	8.6	35.7
6th	Shane O'Neill	8.7	16.3	8.5	33.5
7th	Paul Rodriguez	8.3	-	6.5	14.8
8th	Matt Berger	7.3	-	-	7.3

=== SLS Nike SB Super Crown World Championship: Newark, New Jersey ===
August 24, 2014.

Rank	Skater	Flow	Control	Impact	Score
1st	Nyjah Huston	8.6	33.9	9.0	51.5
2nd	Torey Pudwill	8.5	33.7	6.7	48.9
3rd	Ishod Wair	8.0	32.4	8.1	48.5
4th	Chaz Ortiz	7.9	25.4	8.9	42.2
5th	Matt Berger	7.4	25.2	9.2	41.8
6th	Paul Rodriguez Jr.	7.4	22.3	7.5	37.2
7th	Luan Oliveira	8.9	-	0	8.9
8th	Shane O'Neill	7.1	-	-	7.1

== 2013 SLS World Tour ==
=== SLS at X Games Foz do Iguaçu, Brazil ===
April 18–21, 2013.

Rank	Skater	Flow	Control	Impact	Score
1st	Nyjah Huston	8.3	8.6	31.9	48.8
2nd	Sean Malto	8.3	7.9	23.6	39.8
3rd	Torey Pudwill	8.3	7.2	20.7	36.2
4th	Luan Oliveira	8.4	9.7	16.5	34.6
5th	Chaz Ortiz	8.5	9.0	14.4	31.9
6th	Shane O'Neill	7.2	8.7	15.3	31.2
7th	Mikey Taylor	6.1	6.5	-	12.6
8th	Tom Asta	5.1	-	-	5.1
9th	Ryan Sheckler	7.8	-	16.4	24.2
10th	Peter Ramondetta	5.1	-	18.3	23.4
11th	Ishod Wair	6.5	-	15.5	22.0
12th	Chris Cole	7.2	-	14.6	21.8
13th	Paul Rodriguez	7.6	-	13.4	21.0
14th	Matt Miller	5.6	-	15.1	20.7
15th	David Gonzalez	7.8	-	12.5	20.3
16th	Austyn Gillette	5.4	-	13.5	18.9
17th	Bastien Salabanzi	2.0	-	13.6	15.6
18th	Manny Santiago	5.2	-	6.6	11.8
19th	Dylan Rieder	3.1	-	7.2	10.3
20th	Eric Koston	2.1	-	8.2	10.3
21st	Billy Marks	2.9	-	5.6	8.5

=== SLS at X Games Barcelona, Spain ===
May 16–19, 2013.

Rank	Skater	Flow	Control	Impact	Score
1st	Nyjah Huston	7.9	9.1	33.4	50.4
2nd	Paul Rodriguez	7.1	8.9	34.3	50.3
3rd	Manny Santiago	6.4	8.3	33.0	47.7
4th	Sean Malto	7.1	8.1	22.7	37.9
5th	Luan Olivera	7.0	6.4	24.5	37.9
6th	Mikey Taylor	6.5	8.0	12.4	26.9
7th	Torey	6.7	6.0	-	12.7
8th	Chris Cole	5.9	-	-	5.9
9th	Billy Marks	4.4	-	21.3	25.7
10th	Tom Asta	6.6	-	18.2	24.8
11th	Ryan Sheckler	8.5	-	14.2	22.7
12th	Dylan Rieder	8.3	-	8.8	17.1
13th	Matt Miller	6.2	-	10.1	16.3
14th	Shane O'Neill	8.3	-	6.8	15.1
15th	Bastien Salabanzi	7.6	-	6.7	14.3
16th	Tommy Sandoval	5.5	-	8.1	13.6
17th	Eric Koston	5.5	-	4.9	10.4
18th	Kieran Shaw	2.2	-	6.8	9.0
19th	Ishod Wair	6.0	-	0.0	6.0
20th	Austyn Gillette	4.6	-	0.0	4.6

=== SLS at Kansas City, Missouri ===
June 9th, 2013

Rank	Skater	Flow	Control	Impact	Score
1st	Nyjah Huston	8.9	9.0	37.7	55.2
2nd	Chris Cole	8.0	9.1	34.8	51.9
3rd	Paul Rodriguez	7.3	9.4	34.0	50.7
4th	Dylan Rieder	8.0	8.0	32.7	48.7
5th	Luan Olivera	8.4	8.4	31.9	48.7
6th	Tom Asta	7.8	8.0	19.9	35.7
7th	Mikey Taylor	5.9	5.6	-	11.5
8th	Sean Malto	3.2	-	-	3.2
9th	Torey Pudwill	6.5	-	18.8	25.3
10th	David Gonzalez	4.6	-	19.6	24.2
11th	Ishod Wair	6.6	-	16.6	23.2
12th	Matt Miller	5.9	-	13.8	19.7
13th	Tommy Sandoval	5.9	-	13.1	19.0
14th	Peter Ramondetta	7.3	-	11.6	18.9
15th	Billy Marks	6.4	-	12.3	18.7
16th	Shane O'Neill	3.2	-	15.1	18.3
17th	Eric Koston	5.7	-	9.9	15.6
18th	Bastien Salabanzi	7.5	-	4.9	12.4

Highest Scored Trick Presented by Monster Energy: Nyjah Huston

https://web.archive.org/web/20140116101632/http://streetleague.com/archives/kc-monster-highest-scored-trick-nyjah-huston/

=== SLS at X Games Munich, Germany ===
June 27–30, 2013.

Rank	Skater	Flow	Control	Impact	Score
1st	Chris Cole	8.9	8.8	33.6	51.2
2nd	Paul Rodriguez	8.6	9.2	25.5	43.3
3rd	Luan Olivera	7.8	8.8	24.5	41.1
4th	Sean Malto	6.9	9.3	23.3	39.5
5th	Torey Pudwill	7.9	8.3	23.3	39.5
6th	Shane O'Neill	9.2	8.9	16.2	34.3
7th	Ishod Wair	7.7	7.5	-	15.2
8th	Kieran Shaw	5.8	-	-	5.8
9th	Tom Asta	7.8	-	17.8	25.6
10th	Tommy Sandoval	6.1	-	17.9	24.0
11th	Mikey Taylor	4.5	-	19.3	23.8
12th	Matt Miller	5.6	-	17.4	23.9
13th	Youness Amrani	5.7	-	8.5	14.2
14th	Bastien Salabanzi	5.8	-	8.0	13.8
15th	Billy Marks	6.4	-	-	6.4

=== SLS at Portland, Oregon ===
July 14, 2013.

Rank	Skater	Flow	Control	Impact	Score
1st	Paul Rodriguez	8.1	9.3	30.6	48.0
2nd	Chris Cole	8.6	9.4	29.5	47.5
3rd	Luan Olivera	7.8	9.2	27.3	44.3
4th	Ishod Wair	9.0	9.1	21.8	39.9
5th	Shane O'Neill	7.3	8.7	17.5	33.5
6th	Sean Malto	8.1	9.5	8.5	15.7
7th	Torey Pudwill	7.3	8.4	-	15.7
8th	Nyjah Huston	6.8	-	-	6.8
9th	Austyn Gillette	4.8	-	17.1	21.9
10th	David Gonzalez	6.6	-	15.3	21.9
11th	Tom Asta	7.3	-	14.4	21.7
12th	Dylan Rieder	7.5	-	12.5	20.0
13th	Tommy Sandoval	6.8	-	12.8	19.6
14th	Eric Koston	7.3	-	10.7	18.0
15th	Peter Ramondetta	6.0	-	8.9	14.9
16th	Bastien Salabanzi	8.6	-	5.7	14.3
17th	Billy Marks	4.2	-	7.7	11.9
18th	Matt Miller	4.7	-	4.5	9.2
19th	Mikey Taylor	7.7	-	0.0	7.7
20th	Ryan Sheckler	-	-	-	DNP
21st	Chaz Ortiz	-	-	-	DNP

=== SLS at Los Angeles, California ===
August 1–4, 2013.

Rank	Skater	Flow	Control	Impact	Score
1st	Nyjah Huston	8.7	9.1	35.2	53.0
2nd	Chris Cole	7.3	7.8	29.5	44.6
3rd	Luan Olivera	8.9	9.3	26.0	44.2
4th	Ryan Decenzo	7.8	8.2	22.3	38.3
5th	Shane O'Neill	7.4	8.9	16.8	33.1
6th	Paul Rodriguez	7.2	9.1	16.5	32.8
7th	Torey Pudwill	6.4	8.2	-	14.6
8th	Bastien Salabanzi	6.1	-	-	6.1

=== SLS Super Crown at New Jersey ===
August 25, 2013.

Rank	Skater	Flow	Control	Impact	Score
1st	Chris Cole	8.7	9.1	35.0	52.8
2nd	Nyjah Huston	8.2	8.7	35.5	52.4
3rd	Luan Oliveira	8.2	8.6	32.5	49.3
4th	Paul Rodriguez	9.0	8.7	27.1	44.8
5th	Sean Malto	8.5	9.2	17.8	35.5
6th	Shane O'Neill	8.0	8.5	8.3	24.8
7th	Torey Pudwill	5.7	8.1	-	13.8
8th	Mikey Taylor	4.6	-	-	4.6

2013: Overall Winner, Super Crown World Champion - Chris Cole

Highest Score Trick Award, presented by Monster Energy - (9.9) Shane O'Neill, Switch Double 360 Flip

Highest Score Trick Clip

2013 Street League Awards: Street League Skateboarding Awards

== 2012 SLS World Tour ==
=== SLS at Kansas City, Missouri ===
May 19, 2012.

Rank	Skater	Run	Best Trick	Big	Score
1st	Nyjah Huston	0	9.9	100.0	46.7
2nd	Bastien Salabanzi	7.4	8.7	31.7	n/a
3rd	Chaz Ortiz	8.3	9.8	27	n/a
4th	Paul Rodriguez Jr.	6.7	9.2	26.6	n/a
5th	Chris Cole	7.1	8.9	23.8	42
6th	Ryan Sheckler	7.1	8.3	14.3	29.7
7th	Sean Malto	6.6	8	n/a	14.6
8th	Mikey Taylor	6.5	n/a	n/a	6.5
9th	Luan de Oliveira	n/a	n/a	n/a	6.9
10th	Billy Marks	n/a	n/a	n/a	6.8
11th	Austyn Gillette	n/a	n/a	n/a	6.7
12th	Tommy Sandoval	n/a	n/a	n/a	4.7
13th	Tom Asta	5.0	n/a	13.4	18.4
14th	Dylan Rieder	2.2	n/a	15.8	18.0
15th	Shane O'neill	7.8	n/a	7.1	14.9
16th	David Gonzalez	4.9	n/a	9.3	14.2
17th	Matt Miller	5.6	n/a	7.8	13.9
18th	Ishod Wair	5.6	n/a	7.2	12.8
20th	Eric Koston	3.7	n/a	6.2	9.9
21st	Torey Pudwill	6.7	n/a	inj.	6.7
22nd	Mark Appleyard	4.1	n/a	1.0	5.1
23rd	Mike Mo Capaldi	3.4	n/a	0.0	3.4
24th	Peter Ramondetta	inj.	inj.	inj.	inj.

=== SLS at Ontario, California ===
June 16, 2012.

Rank	Skater	Run	Best Trick	Big	Score
1st	Nyjah Huston	9.2	9.8	29.2	47.7
2nd	Chaz Ortiz	8.7	9	25.5	46.2
3rd	Sean Malto	7.2	7.1	31.6	45.9
4th	Luan de Oliveira	8.9	8.3	23.2	40.4
5th	Paul Rodriguez	8	8.9	20.6	37.5
6th	Peter Ramondetta	6.3	7.8	14.9	29
7th	David González	7.2	6.8	n/a	14
8th	Tommy Sandoval	3.9	n/a	n/a	3.9
9th	Mikey Taylor	n/a	n/a	n/a	7.7
10th	Chris Cole	n/a	n/a	n/a	7.6
11th	Eric Koston	n/a	n/a	n/a	5.6
12th	Matt Miller	n/a	n/a	n/a	4.1
13th	Billy Marks	6.5	n/a	16.3	22.8
14th	Ishod Wair	7.6	n/a	14.2	21.8
15th	Bastien Salabanzi	6.4	n/a	14.5	20.9
16th	Tom Asta	7.4	n/a	13.2	20.6
17th	Shane O'neill	8.0	n/a	8.2	16.2
18th	Ryan Sheckler	8.3	n/a	6.4	14.7
19th	Austyn Gillette	7.1	n/a	7.6	14.7
20th	Mark Appleyard	4.1	n/a	9.6	13.7
21st	Dylan Rieder	5.5	n/a	7.2	12.7
22nd	Mike Mo Capaldi	4.9	n/a	6.3	11.2
23rd	Jimmy Carlin	1.4	n/a	5.8	7.2
24th	Torey Pudwull	1.7	n/a	inj.	1.7

=== SLS at Glendale, Arizona ===
July 15, 2012.

Rank	Skater	Run	Best Trick	Big	Score
1st	Paul Rodriguez	6.8	9	29.9	45.7
2nd	Chris Cole	7.3	9.1	26.7	43.1
3rd	Ryan Sheckler	7.8	8.2	24.5	40.5
4th	Nyjah Huston	6.6	8.6	23.2	38.4
5th	Shane O'Neill	8.1	9.5	15.2	32.8
6th	Sean Malto	7.6	8.2	12.8	28.6
7th	Luan de Oliveira	6.8	7.8	n/a	14.6
8th	Torey Pudwill	4.6	n/a	n/a	4.6
9th	Bastien Salabanzi	7.6	n/a	n/a	7.6
10th	David Gonzalez	6.9	n/a	n/a	6.9
11th	Chaz Ortiz	5.5	n/a	n/a	5.5
12th	Mikey Taylor	4.3	n/a	n/a	4.3
13th	Ishod Wair	6.3	n/a	20.2	26.5
14th	Tommy Sandoval	4.4	n/a	21.2	25.6
15th	Billy Marks	2.8	n/a	21.7	24.5
16th	Tom Asta	7.0	n/a	15.4	22.4
17th	Peter Ramondetta	5.9	n/a	9.8	15.7
18th	Jimmy Carlin	4.7	n/a	6.9	11.6
19th	Mark Appleyard	4.1	n/a	5.3	9.4
20th	Austyn Gillette	4.3	n/a	4.4	8.7
21st	Mike Mo Capaldi	0.3	n/a	6.2	6.5
22nd	Dylan Rieder	1.1	n/a	3.8	4.9
23rd	Matt Miller	4.4	n/a	0.0	4.4
24th	Eric Koston	n/a	n/a	n/a	n/a

=== SLS at Newark, New Jersey ===
August 26, 2012.

Rank	Skater	Run	Best Trick	Big	Score
1st	Nyjah Huston	8.7	8.7	31.1	48.5
2nd	Chris Cole	7.7	9.3	29.1	46.1
3rd	Chaz Ortiz	8.4	8.2	28.3	44.9
4th	Paul Rodriguez	8.5	9.6	23.2	41.3
5th	Ryan Sheckler	8.6	8.4	23.5	40.5
6th	Bastien Salabanzi	7.0	8.7	16.4	32.1
7th	Sean Malto	7.2	8.1	n/a	15.3
8th	Luan de Oliveira	6.7	n/a	n/a	6.7

2012: Overall Winner - Nyjah Huston

== 2011 SLS World Tour ==
=== SLS at Seattle, Washington ===
May 7–8, 2011. Halfonso scored 104.6 points at the first stop in Seattle, Washington.

Rank	Skater	Technical	Line	Big	Score
1st	Nyjah Huston	34.6	28.6	41.4	34.9
2nd	Shane O'Neill	7.2	6.2	25.4	26.0
3rd	Chaz Ortiz	5.0	5.7	31.3	25.7
4th	Ryan Sheckler	5.8	5.3	29.1	24.7
5th	Torey Pudwill	7.7	6.6	27.2	24.6
6th	Chris Cole	5.8	6.5	23.0	21.9
7th	Billy Marks	7.2	4.7	13.9	20.5
8th	Mike Mo Capaldi	6.2	5.4	18	19.2
9th	Mike Taylor	6.4	5.2	25.4	18
10th	Paul Rodriguez	5.9	6.5	17.9	11.1
11th	Tommy Sandoval	4.4	4.9	23.6	17.6
12th	David Gonzalez	5.8	2.8	17.6	15.3
13th	Nick Dompierre	3.9	5.5	20.6	14.3
14th	Dylan Rieder	6.9	7.9	5.8	14.2
15th	Peter Romendetta	3.9	6.0	16.9	14.1
16th	Eric Koston	5.0	5.3	6.8	11.3
17th	Mark Appleyard	2.5	3.3	18.2	11.2
18th	Braydon Szafranski	5.0	0.0	0.0	5.0
19th	PJ Ladd	4.6	0.0	0.0	2.9
20th	Brandon Beibel	inj.	inj.	inj.	inj.
21st	Marc Johnson	inj.	inj.	inj.	inj.
22nd	Terry Kennedy	inj.	inj.	inj.	inj.
23rd	Sean Malto	inj.	inj.	inj.	inj.
24th	Luan de Oliveira	inj.	inj.	inj.	inj.

=== SLS at Kansas City, Missouri ===
June 11–12, 2011.

The second stop in Kansas City, Missouri, was won by Huston, who scored 72.6 points for his second win of the year.

Rank	Skater	Technical	Line	Big	Score
1st	Nyjah Huston	9.4	29	34.2	31.6
2nd	Chris Cole	8.1	20.8	38.2	29.5
3rd	Chaz Ortiz	7.6	32	24.2	28.1
4th	Sean Malto	7.7	29.5	26.2	27.9
5th	Ryan Sheckler	8.8	21.7	31.3	26.5
6th	Torey Pudwill	9.1	15.8	32.3	24.1
7th	Mikey Taylor	8.5	13.4	n/a	13.4
8th	Billy Marks	8.2	11.9	n/a	11.9
9th	Paul Rodriguez	6.2	7.4	24.2	n/a
10th	Shane O'Neill	7.1	5.9	18.9	16.9
11th	Nick Dompierre	5.8	3.8	20.8	16.9
12th	David Gonzalez	5.3	6.6	18.0	16.7
13th	Mike Mo Capaldi	7.3	4.9	11.5	13.6
14th	Luan de Oliveira	5.8	6.5	3.6	13.2
15th	Dylan Reider	6.0	6.5	7.1	12.8
16th	Tommy Sandoval	4.9	3.8	6.9	11.4
17th	Peter Ramondetta	4.9	3.9	4.7	11.4
18th	Mark Appleyard	4.3	3.5	7.6	10.6
19th	Braydon Szafranski	5.7	6.0	0.0	8.1
20th	PJ Ladd	6.3	6.0	0.0	7.1
21st	Brandon Biebel	inj.	inj.	inj.	inj.
22nd	Marc Johnson	inj.	inj.	inj.	inj.
23rd	Terry Kennedy	inj.	inj.	inj.	inj.
24th	Eric Koston	inj.	inj.	inj.	inj.

=== SLS at Glendale, Arizona ===
July 16–17, 2011.

The third stop, in Glendale, Arizona, was won by Huston, who scored 77.8 points; the victory was Huston's fourth.

Rank	Skater	Technical	Line	Big	Score
1st	Nyjah Huston	8.9	7.8	38.3	34.5
2nd	Ryan Sheckler	8	7.6	19.9	29.5
3rd	Chris Cole	8.4	5.6	27.4	25.6
4th	Paul Rodriguez	7.2	5.6	17.6	20.8
5th	Shane O'Neill	8.0	5.6	24.6	18.9
6th	Billy Marks	7.4	7.5	20.6	16.9
7th	Luan de Oliveira	8.3	8.2	18.0	14.6
8th	Tommy Sandoval	7.9	4.9	25.1	11.1
9th	Chaz Ortiz	6.9	5.3	5.8	n/a
10th	Eric Koston	6.1	6.9	6.7	n/a
11th	Sean Malto	7.2	6.3	20.5	27.5
12th	Mikey Taylor	5.5	4.6	15.1	16.0
13th	Peter Romendetta	5.7	5.8	13.8	13.4
14th	Mike Mo Capaldi	2.3	5.7	14.5	11.2
15th	Mark Appleyard	5.2	2.8	14.2	10.0
16th	Dylan Rieder	7.0	0.0	4.7	7.4
17th	Braydon Szafranski	1.0	4.3	n/a	3.0
18th	Brandon Biebel	inj.	inj.	inj.	inj.
19th	Nick Dompierre	inj.	inj.	inj.	inj.
20th	David Gonzalez	inj.	inj.	inj.	inj.
21st	Marc Johnson	inj.	inj.	inj.	inj.
22nd	Terry Kennedy	inj.	inj.	inj.	inj.
24th	Torey Pudwill	inj.	inj.	inj.	inj.

=== SLS at Newark, New Jersey ===
August 28, 2011.

Malto, scoring an 81.2, became the 2011 Street League Champion by winning stop 4 of the year.

Rank	Skater	Technical	Line	Big	Score
1st	Sean Malto	8.6	28.3	44.3	81.2
2nd	Nyjah Huston	8.6	19.2	51.5	79.4
3rd	Chris Cole	7.9	28	35.1	71
4th	Chaz Ortiz	9.3	24.7	21.5	55.5
5th	Paul Rodriguez	8.8	18.1	15	41.9
6th	Mikey Taylor	8.2	14.5	10.1	32.8
7th	Billy Marks	8.1	12.9	n/a	21
8th	Shane O'Neill	7.7	10.6	n/a	18.3
9th	Ryan Sheckler	7.3	n/a	n/a	n/a
10th	Mike Mo Capaldi	n/a	n/a	n/a	n/a

2011: Overall Winner, Super Crown World Champion - Sean Malto

== 2010 SLS World Tour ==
=== SLS at Glendale, Arizona ===
August 28, 2010.

Nyjah Huston placed first at the first ever Street League contest in Glendale, Arizona, scoring a 116.0

Rank	Skater	Creative	Line	Technical	Big	Score
1st	Nyjah Huston	24.5	35.7	20.7	35.1	116
2nd	Shane O'Neill	28.9	33	27.9	28.4	114.9
3rd	Torey Pudwill	23.3	29.3	31	29.3	112.8
4th	Sean Malto	23	32.9	23.4	31.7	111
5th	Chris Cole	30.7	24.4	23.8	35.9	109.6
6th	Chaz Ortiz	21.6	29.7	22.6	25	102.2
7th	Paul Rodriguez	23.3	19.2	25.7	21.9	100.1
8th	Greg Lutzka					
9th	Peter Ramondetta					
10th	Ryan Sheckler					
11th	Eric Koston					
12th	Billy Marks					
13th	Mikey Taylor					
14th	PJ Ladd					
15th	Tommy Sandoval					
16th	Dylan Rieder					
17th	Mark Appleyard					
18th	Terry Kennedy					
19th	Nick Dompierre					
20th	Brandon Biebel					
21st	David Gonzalez					
22nd	Mike Mo Capaldi					
23rd	Marc Johnson	inj.	inj.	inj.	inj.	inj.
24th	Luan de Oliveira	inj.	inj.	inj.	inj.	inj.

=== SLS at Ontario, California ===
September 11, 2010.

First place for the 2010 Ontario, California, stop was awarded to Sean Malto, who scored 120.4 points

Rank	Skater	Creative	Line	Technical	Big	Score
1st	Sean Malto	31.3	31	23.5	21.5	120.4
2nd	Chaz Ortiz	34.2	32.4	30.3	34.6	118.4
3rd	Nyjah Huston	32.7	24.3	22.7	26.2	105.9
4th	Ryan Sheckler	29.2	20.3	27.3	17.7	103.7
5th	Chris Cole	23.1	22.2	31.8	20	97.1
6th	Paul Rodriguez	29.6	26.7	22.4	26.9	96.4
7th	Greg Lutzka	30	21	18	8.6	77.6
8th	Shane O'neil					
9th	Mikey Taylor					
10th	Tory Pudwill					
11th	Eric Koston					
12th	Billy Marks					
13th	Mark Appleyard					
14th	David Gonzalez					
15th	Tommy Sandoval					
16th	Terry Kennedy					
17th	PJ Ladd					
18th	Brandon Biebel					
19th	Marc Johnson					
20th	Dylan Rieder					
21st	Mike Mo Capaldi					
22nd	Nick Dompierre					
23rd	Luan de Oliveira	inj.	inj.	inj.	inj.	inj.
24th	Peter Ramondetta	inj.	inj.	inj.	inj.	inj.

=== SLS at Las Vegas, Nevada ===
September 25, 2010.

Shane O'Neill, scoring 146.0 points, won the final 2010 stop in Las Vegas, Nevada.

Rank	Skater	Creative	Line	Technical	Big	Score
1st	Shane O'Neill	40.9	34.4	31.8	38.9	146
2nd	Chris Cole	30.6	39.2	36.2	37.8	143.8
3rd	Nyjah Huston	35.6	36.3	26.2	25.1	123.2
4th	Chaz Ortiz	40.9	30	27.2	17.5	115.6
5th	Ryan Sheckler	35.1	25	26.4	28	114.5
6th	Paul Rodriguez	26.9	20.6	34.4	24.8	106.7
7th	Greg Lutzka	31.5	14.5	23.1	12.2	81.3
8th	Torey Pudwill	6.8	6.1	6.7	35.3	94.4
9th	Sean Malto	5.0	5.4	4.9	26.9	93.0
10th	Mikey Taylor	5.9	5.5	5.3	34.5	91.7
11th	David Gonzalez	5.2	4.8	4.7	24.6	89.7
12th	Eric Koston	5.2	4.8	4.7	24.6	84.7
13th	Billy Marks	6.4	4.4	4.7	9.9	59.3
14th	Mark Appleyard	5.4	4.0	5.4	7.3	49.7
15th	Nick Dompierre	6.6	5.7	4.7	n/a	49.4
16th	Marc Johnson	5.7	4.7	5.1	n/a	38.1
17th	Brandon Biebel	0.0	3.7	6.9	n/a	36.1
18th	Dylan Rieder	5.5	4.8	0.0	14.6	34.4
19th	Tommy Sandoval	6.4	5.0	4.9	n/a	29.1
20th	PJ Ladd	0.0	3.7	6.3	n/a	16.4
21st	Terry Kennedy	2.9	0.0	5.2	n/a	12.9
22nd	Mike Mo Capaldi	0.0	n/a	0.0	n/a	n/a
23rd	Luan de Oliveira	inj.	inj.	inj.	inj.	inj.
24th	Peter Ramondetta	inj.	inj.	inj.	inj.	inj.

2010: Overall Winner, Super Crown World Champion - Nyjah Huston
