= Kelvin Hoefler =

Brazilian skateboarder (born 1994)

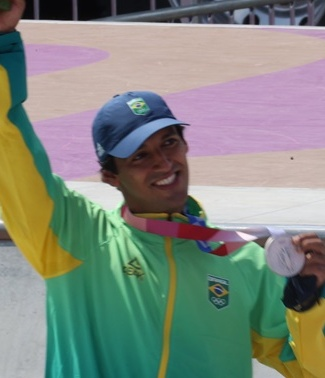
- Hoefler at the 2020 Summer Olympics

Personal information
- Born: 10 February 1993 (age 33) Guarujá, São Paulo, Brazil
- Occupation: Professional skateboarder
- Height: 1.79 m (5 ft 10 in)
- Weight: 77 kg (170 lb)

Sport
- Country: Brazil
- Sport: Skateboarding
- Rank: 14th
- Event: Street
- Turned pro: 2011
Medal record
Men's street skateboarding
Representing Brazil
Event	1st	2nd	3rd
Olympic Games	–	1	–
World Championship	1	1	1
X Games	2	1	2
Total	3	3	3
Olympic Games
Silver medal – second place	2020 Tokyo	Street
World Championships
Gold medal – first place	2015 Chicago	Street
Silver medal – second place	2018 Rio de Janeiro	Street
Bronze medal – third place	2017 Los Angeles	Street
X Games
Gold medal – first place	2017 Minneapolis	
Gold medal – first place	2018 Norway	
Silver medal – second place	2018 Sydney	
Bronze medal – third place	2018 Minneapolis	
Bronze medal – third place	2018 Norway	

Kelvin Hoefler (born 10 February 1993) is a Brazilian professional street skateboarder. He won the silver medal in the inaugural Olympic men's street skateboarding event at the 2020 Summer Olympics in Tokyo. Hoefler finished sixth in the same event at the 2024 Summer Olympics in Paris.

== Career ==
Hoefler began skateboarding at age eight in his hometown of Guarujá in the Brazilian state of São Paulo. After winning some events in his early teens, he committed to pursuing skateboarding as a career. He made his professional debut in 2011.

Hoefler steadily climbed the ranks throughout the 2010s to become one of the leading street skateboarders in the world. He has medaled at every major skateboarding tournament – Olympics, World Skateboarding Championship, and X Games – and has won multiple events in the Street League Skateboarding (SLS) and Dew Tour circuits. His top titles include World Championship gold in 2015, X Games Minneapolis gold in 2017, X Games Norway gold in 2018, and silver at the 2020 Summer Olympics.

His sponsors include Powell-Peralta, Monster, and G-Shock.
