= Vincent Milou =

French skateboarder (born 1996)

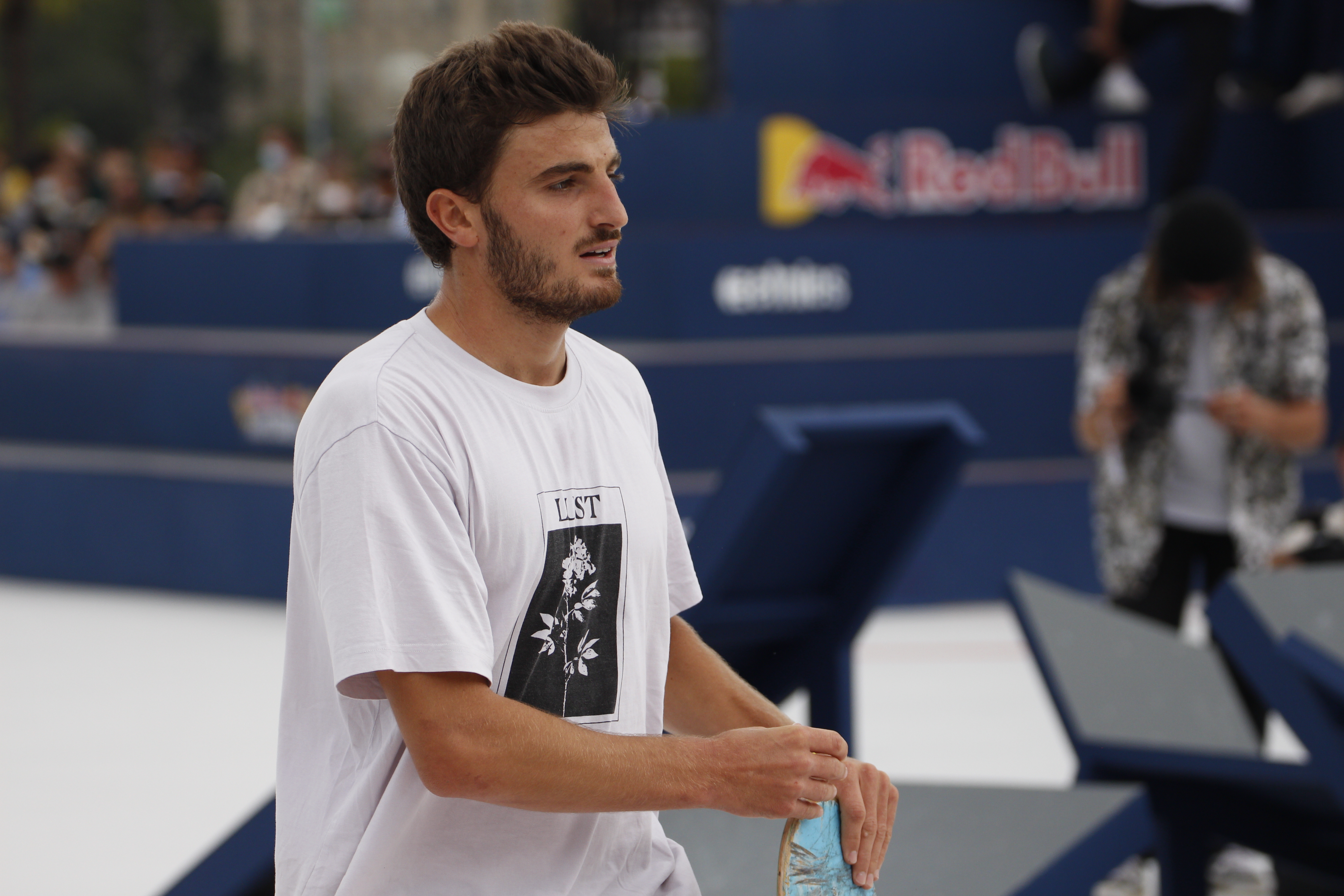

Personal information
- Born: 11 November 1996 (age 29) Tarnos, France
- Height: 5 ft 10 in (178 cm)
- Weight: 150 lb (68 kg)

Sport
- Country: France
- Sport: Skateboarding

Achievements and titles
- Olympic finals: 4th (2020)

Vincent Milou (born 11 November 1996) is a regular-footed French professional skateboarder from Tarnos.

== Skateboarding ==
In 2018, Milou did a front bluntslide on the handrail at el Toro before the 2019 skatestopping of the spot.

=== Competitions ===
In 2018, Milou placed first, above Daisuke Ikeda and Aurélien Giraud, at FISE WORLD, Montpellier.

In July 2019, Milou placed third at the Street League Skateboarding Championship - Los Angeles, finishing behind Yuto Horigome and Maurio McCoy.

== Major results ==
2014
1st Old School Jam, Villiers-sur-Orge
4th Mystic Skate Cup (street), Prague
2015
7th Am Getting Paid, Montreal
6th Kimberley Diamond Cup Street World Championships, Kimberley, South Africa
2016
1st Far'n High, Paris
3rd European Series Am, London
2nd European Series Am, Paris
3rd Beroun Grand Prix Pro, Czech Republic
2nd Mystic Skate Cup (street), Prague
3rd European Series Am, Berlin
1st Fise World Series (park)
3rd World Cup, Moscow
2017
2nd Far'n High, Paris
3rd Nike Berlin Open
1st Fælledparken Open (street), Copenhagen
2nd Copenhagen Open: The Triangle
6th Copenhagen Open: Street Contest
4th Damn Am, Amsterdam
7th Tampa Am
2018
6th Cowtown's Phoenix Am
1st Fise Street Pro, Montpellier
2nd Street League Pro Open, London
7th Red Bull Rollercoaster, Germany
6th Street League, Huntington Beach
2019
2nd Far'n High, Paris
3rd World Skate Street League Pro Tour (street), Los Angeles
1st European Street Championships, Basel, Switzerland
2021
4th Skateboarding at the 2020 Summer Olympics – Men's street, Tokyo
