= Gustavo Ribeiro =

Portuguese professional skateboarder

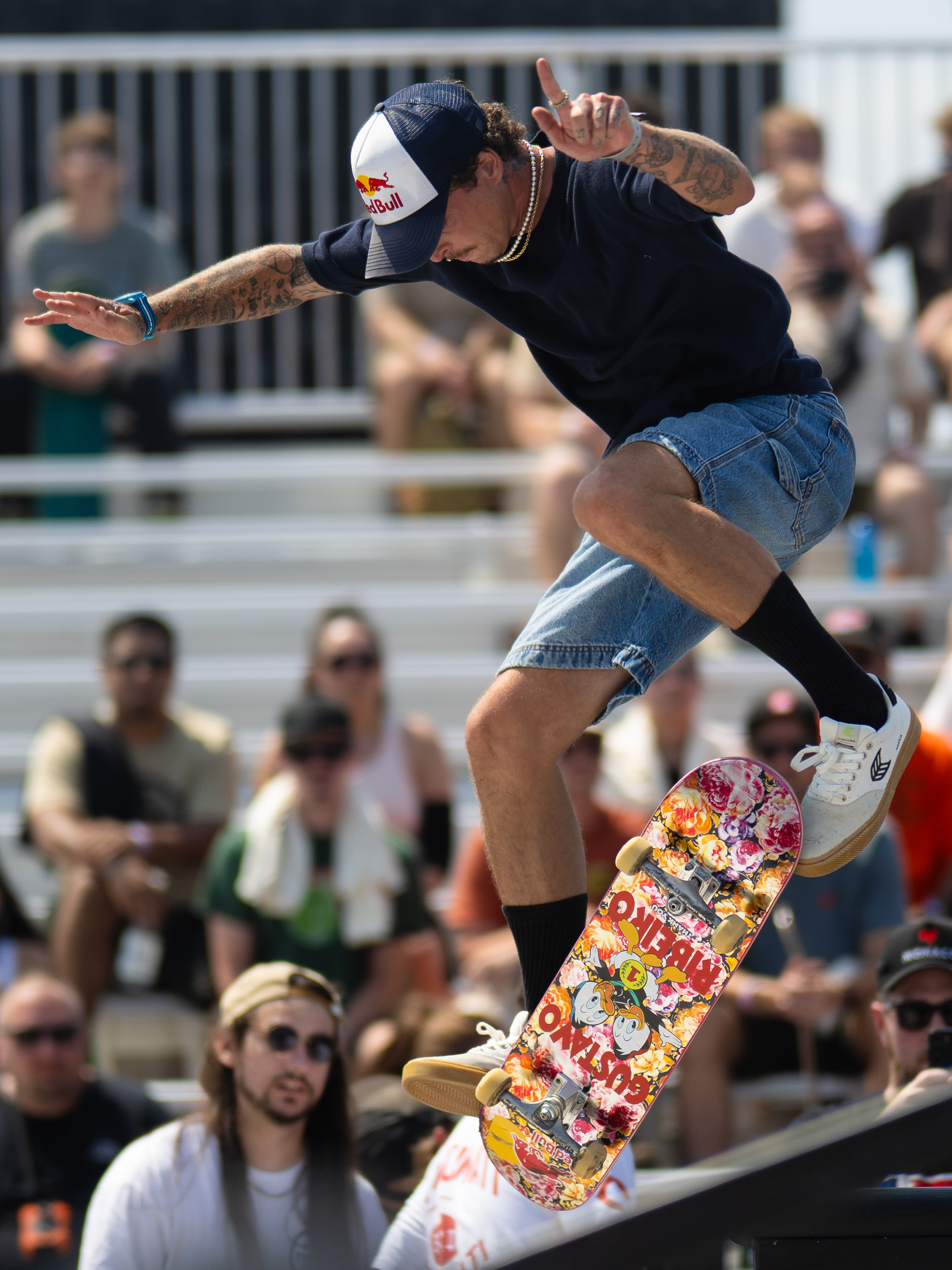
- Ribeiro during a Street League Skateboarding event in 2025

Personal information
- Full name: Gustavo Pereira Ribeiro
- Born: 27 March 2001 (age 25) Lisbon, Portugal
- Height: 179 cm (5 ft 10 in)
- Weight: 65 kg (143 lb)

Sport
- Country: Portugal
- Sport: Skateboarding
- Rank: 7th
- Event: Street
- Turned pro: 2019
- Coached by: Paulo Ribeiro (father)

Achievements and titles
- Olympic finals: 8th (2020), 17th (2024)
- World finals: 3rd (2019, 2021)
- Highest world ranking: 3rd (2020)
Medal record
Men's street skateboarding
Representing Portugal
World Championships
| Gold medal – first place | 2022 Rio de Janeiro | Street |
| Silver medal – second place | 2023 Sharjah | Street |
| Silver medal – second place | 2023 Paris | Street |
| Silver medal – second place | 2025 Miami | Street |
| Bronze medal – third place | 2019 São Paulo | Street |
| Bronze medal – third place | 2021 Jacksonville | Street |
| Bronze medal – third place | 2023 San Diego | Street |
| Bronze medal – third place | 2024 São Paulo | Street |
World Roller Games
| Silver medal – second place | 2019 Barcelona | Street |

Gustavo Pereira Ribeiro (Note: This name uses Portuguese naming customs: the first or maternal family name is Pereira and the second or paternal family name is Ribeiro.) (born 27 March 2001) is a Portuguese professional skateboarder. He won the bronze medal at the 2019 World Skateboarding Championship on street skateboarding and won the Street League Skateboarding super crown in 2022. He participated at the 2020 Summer Olympics and the 2024 Summer Olympics.

== Early life ==
Ribeiro got his first skateboard at the age of four as his uncle's Christmas gift. Two years later, he got sponsored by Bana, a local surf & skate shop, along with his twin brother, Gabriel Ribeiro. Days later, they competed at Bana's local competition and both finished in the top three, with Gabriel winning the contest and Gustavo placing third, in their first ever competition. The brothers kept pushing each other and did a family trip to Switzerland to compete in their first ever international competition. Gabriel won the competition, and Gustavo placed third. Since then they started competing and dedicating themselves to the sport. At only 14 years old, he started travelling alone to international competitions.

== Career ==
On 12 November 2017, he won Tampa Am, one of the biggest worldwide amateur competitions in street skateboarding, that serves as an introduction of new talented skaters in the skateboarding scene. The competition is ranked below the famous competition Tampa Pro.

In May 2021, he suffered a shoulder dislocation and missed the 2021 World Championships in Rome, Italy.

After almost two months of recovery he represented Portugal at the men's street competition of the 2020 Summer Olympics. During the qualification round he suffered from shoulder pain and finished last on the final round, getting a debut 8th place and an olympic diploma.

On 28 August 2021, he got his first ever win in a SLS competition, winning the first out of three stops of the SLS Men's Championship Tour in Salt Lake City, United States. This was his first competition after his full recovery from an eventual shoulder surgery after his recurrent shoulder injuries.

== Personal life ==
His twin brother, Gabriel Ribeiro is an amateur skateboarder with hopes of following Gustavo's steps. Their father Paulo Ribeiro is currently their coach.

In 2019, he paused his secondary school studies to become a full time professional skateboarder.

His skateboarding idols are Nyjah Huston and Shane O'Neill. His sports idol is Portuguese footballer Cristiano Ronaldo.
