= David González (skateboarder) =

Colombian skateboarder

Personal information
- Born: 9 August 1990 (age 35) Medellín, Colombia
- Occupation: Skateboarder

David González (born 9 August 1990) is a Colombian professional skateboarder. In December 2012, he was named Thrasher magazine's "Skater of the Year".

== Early life ==
González was born and raised in Bello, a municipality north of Medellín, Colombia. He revealed in a 2012 interview, for the "Weekend Buzz" show of the RIDE Channel, that he has been growing his hair since he was 12 years of age, the same age that he ceased attending school (in seventh grade) to concentrate on skateboarding.

González revealed in a 2013 online interview that he lost his virginity to a sex worker in Colombia at the age of 15 or 16 years:

"I was in Colombia. You know, one of those days where my homies, like, 'Yeah, dude, it's time for you to do it now. You're a man—you hang out with the big boys now. It's time for you to really know what's going on.' We went out, we got a hooker; went back to [...] my homies house ... Yeah, the first time I had sex was with a hooker—it was fun."

== Professional skateboarding ==
At 13 years of age, González came to the attention of skateboard company Flip Skateboards at the Tampa Am contest, held at the Skatepark of Tampa in Florida, U.S.—Flip negotiated a contract with the teenager, who, at that time, was a newly signed rider for a company named Monkey Stix. The Monkey Stix contract had become widely known among the participants of that years contest as highly questionable, as it offered González a nominal monthly remuneration amount (a five-year contract that paid US$50 per month—González signed the contract when he was twelve years of age). After signing with Flip, González engaged in a protracted process to remove himself from the contract.

As of January 2013, González is a professional member of the Flip Skateboards team the company has released numerous signature model skateboard decks that feature González's name, including "P2"-technology decks.

González has released a signature model shoe with the Globe company, entitled "The Heathen"—an advertisement for González's shoe model was published on the Internet. The "Heathen", together with the "Odin", the signature model of professional skateboarder, Chris Haslam, was re-designed for a collaboration with Thrasher in April 2012)

The Globe brand was invited to film a "Double Rock" video segment in San Francisco, California, US, at the skatepark (named "Double Rock") that is owned by Thrasher—González, together with other Globe team members Haslam, Ryan Decenzo, and Louis Barletta, was featured in the video that was published in black-and-white on the Internet. In its blurb for the video, the magazine stated that the "Globe dudes kinda ripped Double Rock a new butthole".

In September 2012, Thrasher magazine featured González in a profile and video, entitled Possessed to Skate, describing his "timeless transition skills" in "one of the best parts we've ever seen". González filmed the part over six months, during which time, longtime professional skateboarder, Christian Hosoi, filmed guest tricks for the part. Flip released a "Possessed to Skate" signature model skateboard deck for Gonzales, in a "P2"-technology design.

The video part received the highest number of views out of all of the videos released by Thrasher in 2012 and was acknowledged on over 10,000 occasions on the magazine's Facebook fan page, as fans utilized Facebook's "Like" function.

=== Sponsors ===
As of August 2015, González is sponsored by Flip, Globe, Rockstar Energy Drink, Ricta, Mob, Independent Trucks, ESP Guitars and OC Ramps.

=== Management ===
Alongside sponsored skateboarders Leticia Bufoni, González is a client of management company RND Management. "

== Contests ==
González is a Street League competitor and placed 7th at the Ontario, California event in 2012. As of 2013, his best X Games result is 9th place for the street skateboarding event.

== Awards and accolades ==
In December 2012, González was named Thrasher magazine's twenty-second "Skater of the Year". González was informed of the award at his American home and subsequently exclaimed, "You don't even know how fucking stoked I am dude!"

NBC Sports' Alli (Alliance of Action Sports) described González as "the gnarliest skater to emerge from Colombia".

== Personal life ==
González is an avid guitar player and is the lead guitarist in his own band, Rattblack.

== Videography ==
- Flip: Feast Tours (2006)
- Thrasher: Money For Blood (2007)
- Globe: United By Fate (2007)
- Strange Notes: Covers, Baby! (2007)
- Flip: Extremely Sorry (2009)
- Mob Grip/Thrasher: Possessed to Skate: David Gonzalez (2012)
- Flip: The Weight of the World (2012)
- Volcom: Holy Stokes (2016)
