= Maurio McCoy =

American professional skateboarder (born 1995)

Personal information
- Born: November 18, 1995 (age 30) Reading, Pennsylvania, U.S.

Sport
- Country: United States
- Sport: Skateboarding

Maurio McCoy (born November 18, 1995) is a regular-footed American professional skateboarder from Reading, Pennsylvania.

== Skateboarding ==
=== Skate video parts ===
- 2018: Til the End Vol. 1 – Santa Cruz
- 2018: Til the End Vol. 2 – Santa Cruz

=== Competitions ===
In July 2019, McCoy placed second at the Street League Skateboarding Championship – Los Angeles, finishing behind Yuto Horigome and ahead of Vincent Milou.
