= Roller sports at the 2023 Pan American Games – Women's street =

Women's street at the 2023 Pan American Games
- Venue: Urban Sports Esplanade
- Dates: October 21
- Competitors: 9 from 8 nations
- Winning score: 236.98

Medalists
Gold medal	Rayssa Leal	Brazil
Silver medal	Pâmela Rosa	Brazil
Bronze medal	Paige Heyn	United States

The women's street competition of the roller sports events at the 2023 Pan American Games was held on October 21 at the Urban Sports Esplanade in Santiago, Chile.

== Schedule ==
Date	Time	Round
October 21, 2023	11:00	Final

== Results ==
Rank	Skateboarder	Nation	Run		Trick					Total				
Rank	Skateboarder	Nation	1st place, gold medalist(s)	Rayssa Leal	Brazil	76.03	~~44.82~~	~~68.68~~	~~0.00~~	Total	76.72	84.23	~~67.96~~	236.98
2nd place, silver medalist(s)	Pâmela Rosa	Brazil	~~70.24~~	73.17	~~0.00~~	~~0.00~~	60.72	77.44	~~0.00~~	211.34				
3rd place, bronze medalist(s)	Paige Heyn	United States	~~65.18~~	69.52	~~0.00~~	~~0.00~~	42.18	64.65	~~0.00~~	176.35				
4	Jazmín Álvarez	Colombia	~~42.58~~	43.48	60.23	60.41	~~0.00~~	~~58.65~~	~~0.00~~	164.12				
5	Julieta González	Uruguay	~~14.19~~	45.60	42.18	56.47	~~0.00~~	~~0.00~~	~~0.00~~	144.25				
6	Valentina Petric	Chile	35.22	~~30.25~~	~~0.00~~	~~0.00~~	45.22	40.11	~~0.00~~	120.55				
7	Aldana Bertrán	Argentina	21.25	~~8.24~~	24.40	~~0.00~~	~~0.00~~	56.84	~~0.00~~	102.49				
8	Vianez Morales	Puerto Rico	~~37.20~~	38.36	32.11	~~25.86~~	~~0.00~~	31.89	~~0.00~~	102.36				
9	Samantha Secours	Canada	~~17.41~~	20.91	~~0.00~~	42.35	~~0.00~~	0.00	~~0.00~~	63.26				
