= Roos Zwetsloot =

Dutch skateboarder (born 2000)

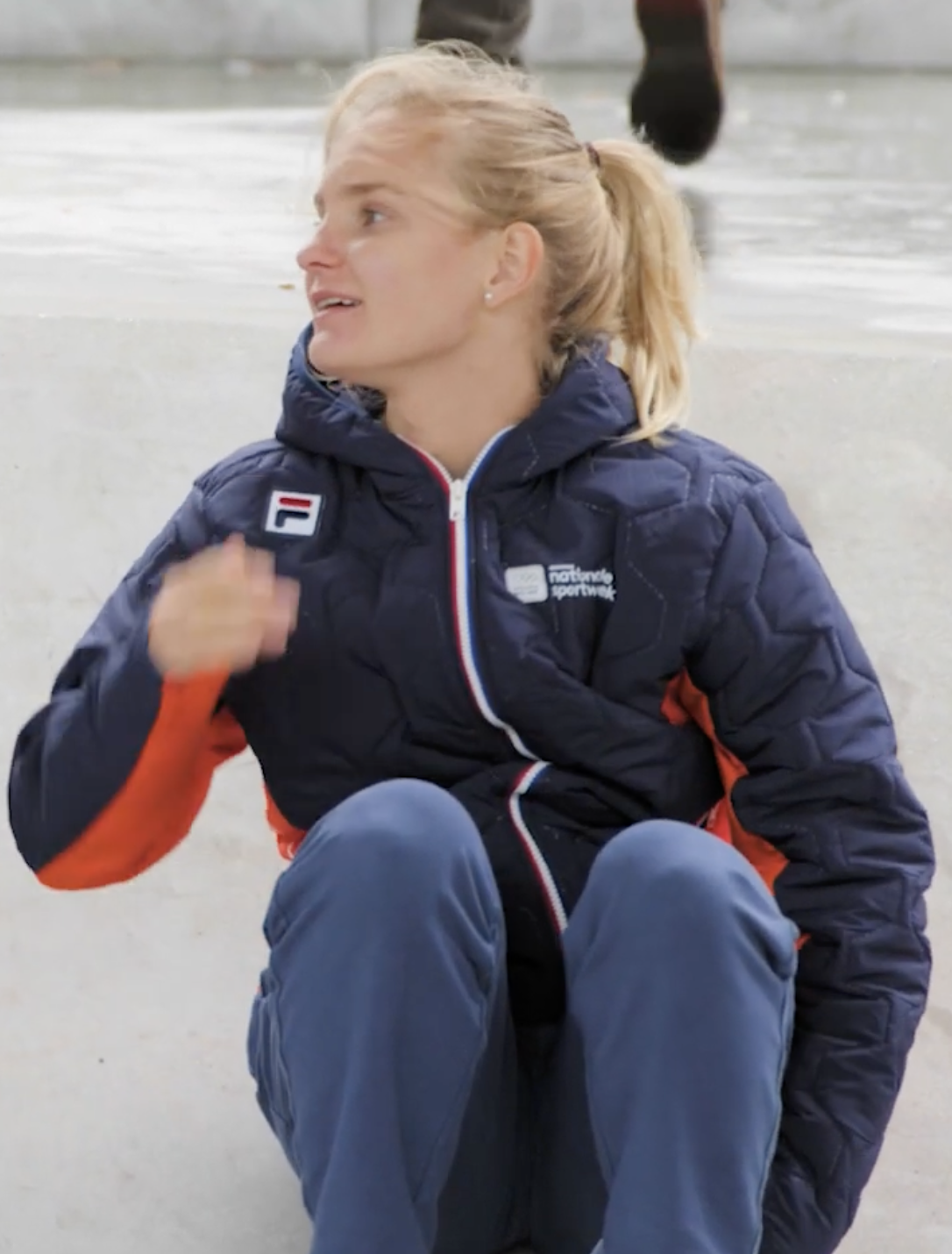
- Roos Zwetsloot at the 2022 NOC*NSF Nationale Sportweek

Personal information
- Born: 27 July 2000 (age 25) Utrecht, Netherlands

Sport
- Country: Netherlands
- Sport: Skateboarding
- Rank: 14th

Achievements and titles
- Olympic finals: 5th (2020)

Roos Zwetsloot (born 27 July 2000) is a Dutch skateboarder. She competed in the women's street event at the 2020 Summer Olympics and finished in 5th place.

== 2020 Olympics ==
At the Tokyo 2020 Olympics, Zwetsloot was one of 20 athletes that competed for the women's street skateboarding event. Zwetsloot qualified by being ranked 7th by Olympic World Skateboarding Rankings. In the semifinals, Zwetsloot came in 4th place, advancing to the finals round. In the finals, Zwetsloot performed well in the open runs, putting her in first place going into the single trick section. However, in the trick section, Zwetsloot landed only 1 of her 5 trick attempts, dropping her to 5th place in the final result.

== Major results ==
=== 2023 ===
3rd Women's Street League (SLS) Tokyo Final

=== 2021 ===
3rd Women's Street Final at the 2021 Dew Tour
5th Skateboarding at the 2020 Summer Olympics – Women's street
5th Women's Street League (SLS) Supercrown Final
3rd Women's Street League (SLS) Salt Lake City Final
5th Women's Street League (SLS) Lake Havasu Final
