= Ishod Wair =

American skateboarder

Personal information
- Full name: Ishod-Kedar Burti Wair
- Born: November 1, 1991 (age 34) Bordentown, New Jersey, U.S.
- Height: 6 ft 0 in (1.83 m)
- Weight: 160 lb (73 kg)

Sport
- Country: United States
- Sport: Skateboarding
- Turned pro: 2011
Medal record
Men's street skateboarding
Representing the United States
World Championships
Bronze medal – third place	2014 Newark	Street

Ishod-Kedar Burti Wair (born November 1, 1991) is an American professional skateboarder.

== Early life and education ==
Wair was raised in Bordentown, New Jersey, where he began skateboarding at the age of nine. Over the next few years he began to consolidate other activities such as basketball in favor of focusing solely on his skateboarding career. Wair left high school before graduating in order to focus on his skateboarding career.

In 2009, Wair, then 18, attended the Tampa Am, an amateur skateboarding contest held in Tampa, Florida, placing 18th out of 36 skaters who qualified for the semi-finals. Despite not qualifying for the finals, the Tampa Am catalyzed his career in part due to his handing out promotional DVDs to potential sponsors.

== Career ==
Following the Tampa Am, Real Skateboards began providing free skateboards to Wair for over a year, eventually officially adding him to their amateur team. Real Skateboards turned Wair pro in 2011. In 2013, Thrasher named Wair their Skater of the Year after he released four video parts. In 2015, he made his first appearance at a Super Crown event, finishing second – beating out competition that included some of the top-ranked professionals in the industry. In 2016, he released his own signature shoe with Nike, the SB Dunk Low Pro "Ishod Wair". He has since released more signature SB Dunks. In early 2022, Nike released a unique signature shoe for Wair, the Nike SB Ishod Wair.

== Street League ==
Wair entered Street League Skateboarding in 2012 after going pro for Real Skateboards. Since then, Wair has made seven 9 Club appearances and has made it to four Finals. Ishod's best year so far came in 2014 when he finished second at the first ever Pro Open placing, his highest career placement to date. His momentum continued through 2014, when he made it to the Super Crown World Championship and placed third.

== Sponsors ==
Ishod Wair's sponsors have included Bronson Speed Co., Pacifico Cerveza, Real Skateboards, Nike SB, Thunder Trucks, Spitfire Wheels, Stance Socks, Monster Energy, Dime, and Shake Junt.
