= Jamie Foy =

American skateboarder

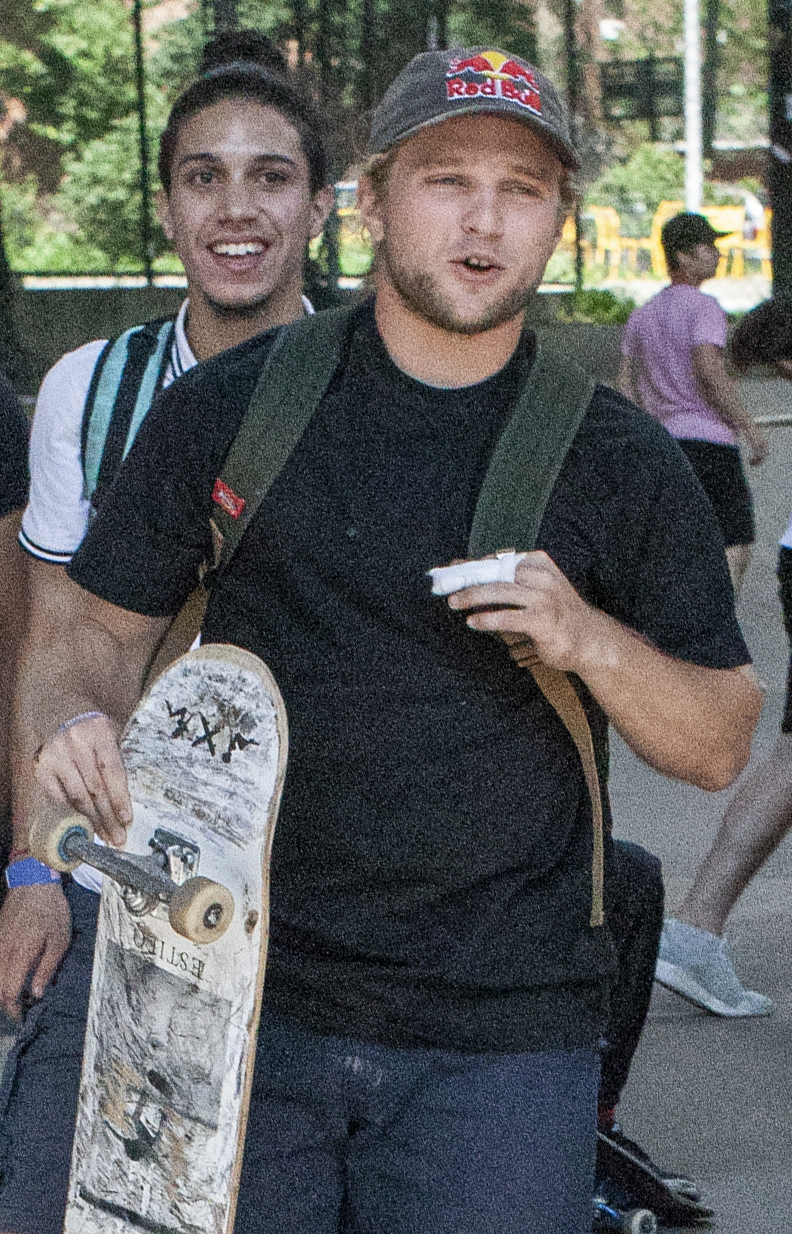
- Foy at LES skatepark, 2019

Personal information
- Born: June 14, 1996 (age 30) Deerfield Beach, Florida, U.S.

Sport
- Country: United States
- Sport: Skateboarding
Medal record
Summer X Games
Representing United States
Bronze medal – third place	2019 Los Angeles	Real Street
Silver medal – second place	2021 California	Skateboard Street
Gold medal – first place	2021 California	Skateboard Street Best Trick

Jamie Foy (born June 14, 1996) is an American regular-footed skateboarder. Foy was crowned 2017 and 2024 Skater of the Year by Thrasher magazine. He skates for Deathwish Skateboards, Thunder Trucks, Shake Junt, Spitfire Wheels, Red Bull, and New Balance Numeric.

== Career ==
Foy was born and grew up in Deerfield Beach, Florida. He started skating at the age of 1 and entering local skate contests at a young age. Foy started his career in 2013 and won several competitions in Florida, Georgia, and Pennsylvania.

In 2016, Foy moved to Los Angeles and quickly gained popularity after appearing in 7 videos in 2016 and 2017. In 2017, he became pro for Deathwish Skateboards and was invited to join the Street League Tour. He was named Thrasher's Skater of the Year the same year.

Foy has won a total of three X Games medals in 2019 and 2021.

== Filmography ==
- CHAPPED: HERE AND NOW (2018)
- Deathwish: Deathwish (2018)
- Dickies: Another Day, Another Bodega (2019)
- New Balance: String Theory (2019)
- Red Bull: YOU GOOD? (2019)
- Deathwish: Uncrossed (2020)
- Cinco (2021)
- Dickies: Loose Ends (2021)
- Spitfire: Stoking The Fire (2022)
- Baker / Deathwish: BAKER HAS A DEATHWISH PART 2 (2024)
- Dickies: Honeymoon (2024)
- New Balance: Intervals (2024)
