= Felipe Gustavo =

Brazilian skateboarder (born 1991)

Personal information
- Full name: Felipe Gustavo Alves de Macedo
- Born: 22 February 1991 (age 35) Brasília, Brazil

Sport
- Country: Brazil
- Sport: Skateboarding
Medal record
Men's street skateboarding
Representing Brazil
World Championships
Bronze medal – third place	2018 Rio de Janeiro	Street
Summer X Games
Bronze medal – third place	2018 Norway	Street
Street League Skateboarding
Gold medal – first place	2023 Sydney	Street

Felipe Gustavo (born 22 February 1991) is a Brazilian professional skateboarder who is specialized in street skateboarding.

== Early life ==
Felipe Gustavo was born on 22 February 1991 in Brasília, Brazil. Felipe began skateboarding at the age of seven after being introduced to the sport by his two older brothers.

== Career ==
In 2007, Felipe's father sold their family car to buy himself and Felipe tickets to travel to the 2007 Tampa Am contest in Tampa, Florida. Felipe won the contest, gaining him both national and international fame. Afterwards, he joined the elite team at skateboarding company Plan B Skateboards.

In November 2013, Felipe went professional. His inaugural season at Street League Skateboarding in 2015 was slowed by injuries. Also, in 2015, Felipe won the Make the Switch Award at Red Bull Hart Lines in Detroit, Michigan.

In 2018, Felipe won a bronze medal in Street at X Games Norway. Also in 2018, he won 3rd place at the World Skate World Championships and won 2nd place at Tampa Pro in Tampa Bay, Florida.

In 2019, Felipe was among eight men and eight women selected for Brazil's first national skateboarding team. Also in 2019, he won 3rd place at the Dew Tour in Long Beach, California and won 3rd place at the Street League World Championships in Rio de Janeiro, Brazil. In March 2019, Felipe tore a ligament in his right foot. It took more than a year before he could skateboard without feeling pain.

In 2021, Felipe placed 14th in Men's street at the 2020 Tokyo Olympics.

Felipe is on the Plan B Skateboards team and the Adidas Skateboarding squad.

== Personal life ==
Felipe currently resides in Los Angeles, California. His nickname is Buchecha.

Felipe is close friends with American skateboarder Nyjah Huston and Brazilian skateboarder Leticia Bufoni. Felipe considers anyone who skateboards to be "family."
