= Matt Berger =

Canadian skateboarder

Personal information
- Born: October 10, 1993 (age 32) Kamloops, British Columbia, Canada
- Height: 183 cm (6 ft 0 in)
- Weight: 82 kg (181 lb)

Sport
- Country: Canada
- Sport: Skateboarding
- Rank: 18th

Matt Berger (born October 10, 1993) is a Canadian skateboarder, competing in the street discipline. Berger currently resides in Huntington Beach, California.

== Career ==
At the 2021 Street Skateboarding World Championships Berger finished in sixth.

In June 2021, Berger was named to Canada's 2020 Olympic team, in the inaugural skateboarding competition. Berger ultimately competed at the Tokyo 2020 Olympics, placing 20th overall. In 2024, Berger qualified for his second Olympics in Paris, and placed 11th overall.
