= Coco Yoshizawa =

Japanese skateboarder

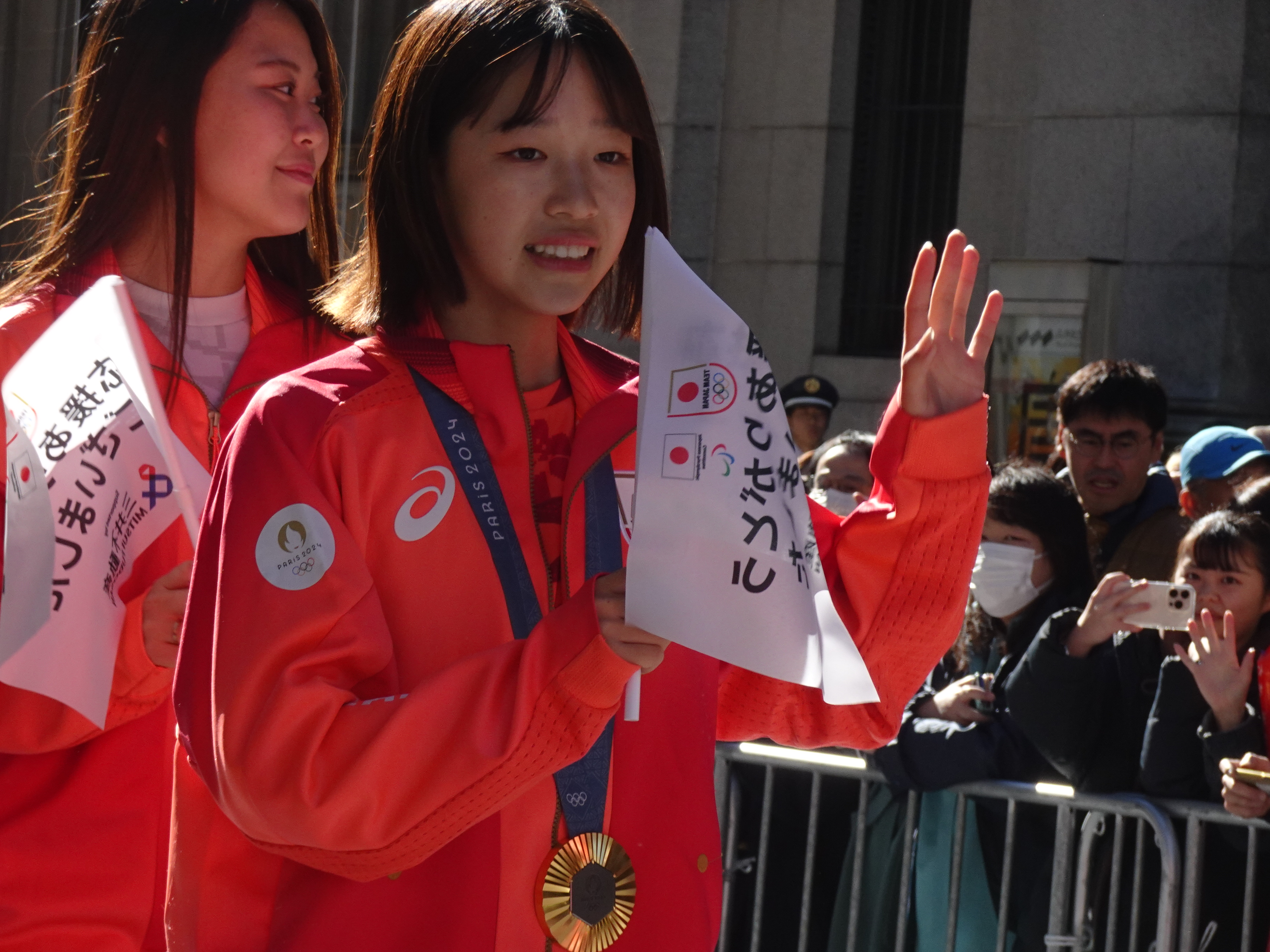
- Yoshizawa in November 2024

Personal information
- Born: 22 September 2009 (age 17) Kanagawa, Japan
- Height: 160 cm (5 ft 3 in)

Sport
- Country: Japan
- Sport: Skateboarding
- Position: Regular-footed
- Rank: 1st
Medal record
Women's street skateboarding
Representing Japan
Olympic Games
Gold medal – first place	2024 Paris	Street
World Championships
Bronze medal – third place	2025 São Paulo	Street
World Skate Games
Bronze medal – third place	2026 Asunción	Street
X Games
Silver medal – second place	2026 Chiba	Street

Coco Yoshizawa (Japanese: 吉沢 恋, Yoshizawa Koko; born 22 September 2009) is a Japanese skateboarder. She competed at the 2024 Summer Olympics and won the gold medal in the women's street event.

== Career ==
Yoshizawa was born on 22 September 2009 in Kanagawa, Japan, and grew up in Sagamihara. At the age of seven, she first tried out skateboarding through the influence of her brother. She initially viewed it as "just a hobby" and learned tricks from someone at a local park. At the age of 11, she watched the Tokyo 2021 Olympics and saw 13-year-old Momiji Nishiya win the gold medal with a move that Yoshizawa had already been able to perform. She did not have a phone at the time and did not use social media, and thus she "wasn't plugged into skateboarding culture [and] she and her family had no idea how good she was," according to Self.

After the 2021 Olympics, Yoshizawa started to compete in tournaments. She participated in the Japanese national championships that year and placed fifth. In 2022, she competed in the Japan Open, finishing eighth. She was second at the 2023 Uprising Tokyo tournament and later that year placed fifth at the World Championships. In 2024, she won bronze at the 2024 World Skateboarding Tour Dubai, competing in the street skating event. She competed at the 2024 Olympic Qualifier Series and placed third at the first event, then first at the second to secure qualification for the 2024 Summer Olympics, being age 14 at the games.

In the semifinals at the 2024 Olympics, Yoshizawa recorded the top score, with 258.92 points, securing a spot in the finals. In the final, she successfully performed a "big spin flip frontside boardslide" and won the gold medal with a score of 272.75, ahead of Liz Akama and Rayssa Leal.

In 2025, she was named as one of the Girls of the Year by Time magazine.
