= Peter Ramondetta =

American professional skateboarder (born 1982)

- Born: Wichita Ks
- Other name: Petey
- Occupation: Skateboarder
- Years active: 1986 – Present
- Website: twitter.com/PeterRamondetta

Peter Ramondetta (born December 18, 1982) is an American professional skateboarder. In 2012, he took 16th place overall in Street League.

== Early life ==
Ramondetta was born in Wichita, Kansas, United States (US), and was raised in a religious family. Before the age of four, his family moved to Guthrie, Oklahoma, whereby he attend church every Sunday with his family. He also played for the town's youth soccer team, Sting, for seven seasons until 1994 where at the age of eleven, he relocated to Tulsa, Oklahoma with his family.

While living in Tulsa, Oklahoma, US, in the late 1990s, he developed a reputation among the local skate scene as being one of the most talented skateboarders in the city. He eventually became known as the "local hero"—a title earned after skateboarding at Tulsa's famed downtown Bartlet Square, with Kerry Getz, Elissa Steamer, Brian Anderson, and Ed Templeton, following a skateboard demo held by the Toy Machine team. Transworld Skateboarding magazine photographers and writers that were currently writing a story documenting the Toy Machine tour witnessed Ramondetta skating, and were so impressed to see a local skateboarder that was skating on par with the professionals they mentioned Ramondetta in the article, calling him the local hero.

== Professional skateboarding ==
Shortly after his Transworld coverage, Ramondetta became sponsored by Deluxe Distribution's subsidiaries: Real Skateboards, and both their Spitfire and Thunder trucks brands. As of 2013, he is sponsored by HUF (Darren Romanelli), Monster Energy, MOB grip tape, and LOUDHeadphones.com.

== Personal life ==
During a 2012 interview while living in San Francisco, California, Ramondetta stated that he no longer holds any religious beliefs. Peter married his childhood girlfriend and first kiss Sarah June 29 2024. Peter also converted to Orthodox Christian in 2025.
