= Kairi Netsuke =

Japanese skateboarder (born 2003)

Kairi Netsuke 根附 海龍
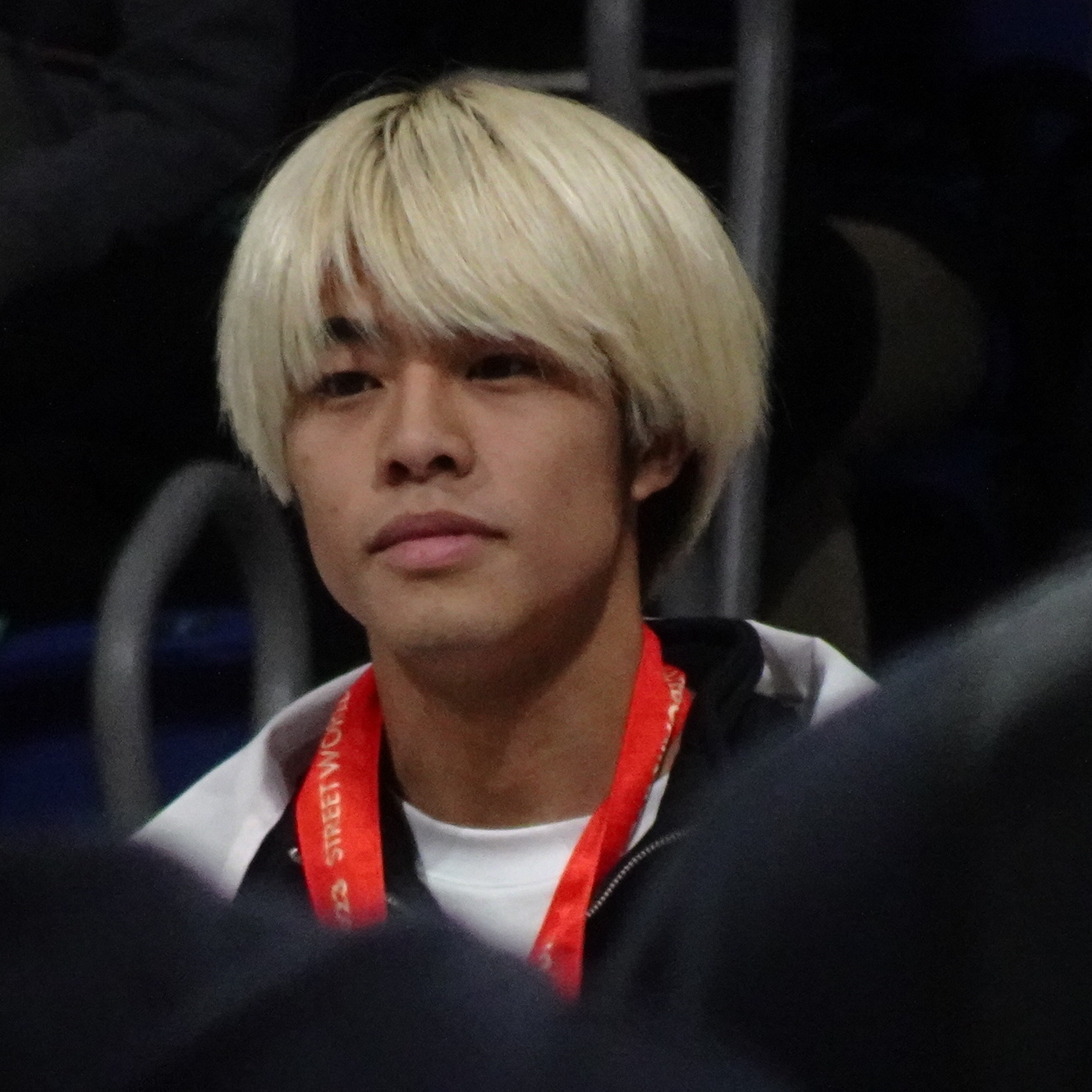
- Netsuke in 2023

Personal information
- Born: 19 August 2003 (age 22)
- Home town: Shimada, Shizuoka, Japan

Sport
- Country: Japan
- Sport: Skateboarding
- Position: Goofy-footed
- Event: Street
Medal record
Men's street skateboarding
Representing Japan
World Championships
Silver medal – second place	2023 Tokyo	Street
X Games
Silver medal – second place	2024 Chiba	Street

Kairi Netsuke (根附 海龍, Netsuke Kairi; born 19 August 2003) is a Japanese skateboarder. He is a World Skateboarding Championship silver medalist.

== Career ==
In December 2023, he competed at the World Skateboarding Championship in the street event. During the quarterfinals he had the highest score of 80.37. During the finals he won a silver medal with a score of 273.60, finishing ahead of 2020 Summer Olympics gold medalist Yuto Horigome.

Following the 2024 Olympic Qualifier Series, Netsuke was ranked fifth in the world street skateboarding rankings, however, Japan already met its quota of three skaters, and as a result he didn't qualify for the 2024 Summer Olympics.
