= Liz Akama =

Japanese skateboarder (born 2009)

Liz Akama 赤間 凛音
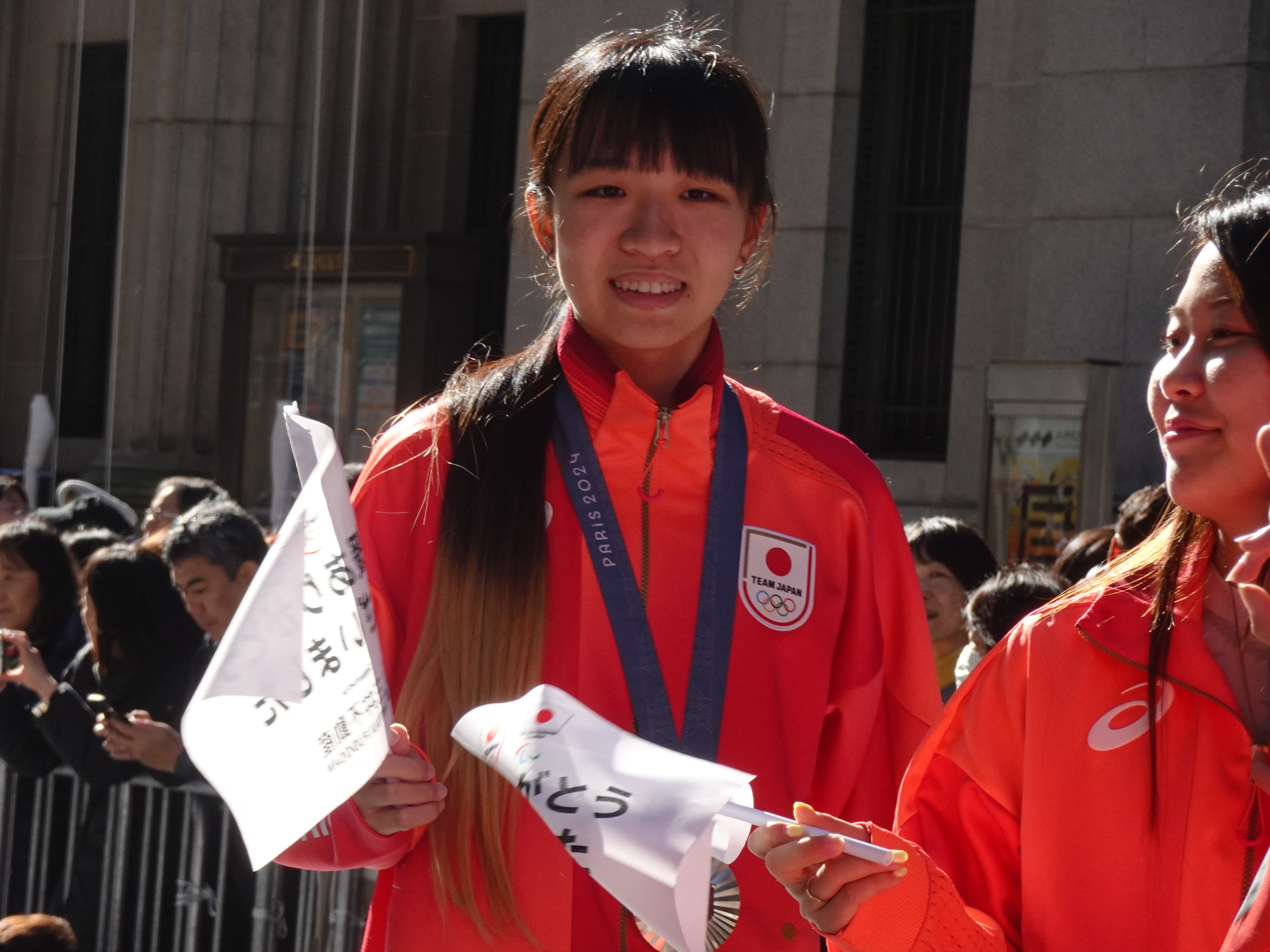
- Liz Akama on November 30, 2024

Personal information
- Native name: 赤間 凛音
- Born: 8 January 2009 (age 17) Aomori, Japan

Sport
- Country: Japan
- Sport: Skateboarding
- Position: Regular-footed
- Rank: 2nd
- Event: Street
Medal record
Women's street skateboarding
Representing Japan
Olympic Games
Silver medal – second place	2024 Paris	Street
X Games
Silver medal – second place	2024 Ventura	Street
Silver medal – second place	2023 California	Street
Silver medal – second place	2023 California	Street Best Trick
Bronze medal – third place	2024 Ventura	Street Best Trick
Bronze medal – third place	2024 Chiba	Street
Bronze medal – third place	2023 Chiba	Street
World Championships - Street League Skateboarding (SLS)
Gold medal – first place	2025 Las Vegas	Street
Gold medal – first place	2024 Las Vegas	Street
Silver medal – second place	2025 São Paulo	Street
Silver medal – second place	2024 Tokyo	Street
Silver medal – second place	2024 Sydney	Street

Liz Akama (赤間 凛音, Akama Rizu; born 8 January 2009) is a Japanese skateboarder who won a silver medal in women's street skateboarding at the 2024 Summer Olympics.

== Career ==
She began skateboarding in second grade with encouragement from her father, who was a surfer. Aside from her Olympic medal, she has also captured three silver medals and two bronze medals at the X Games.
