= Aori Nishimura =

Japanese street skateboarder

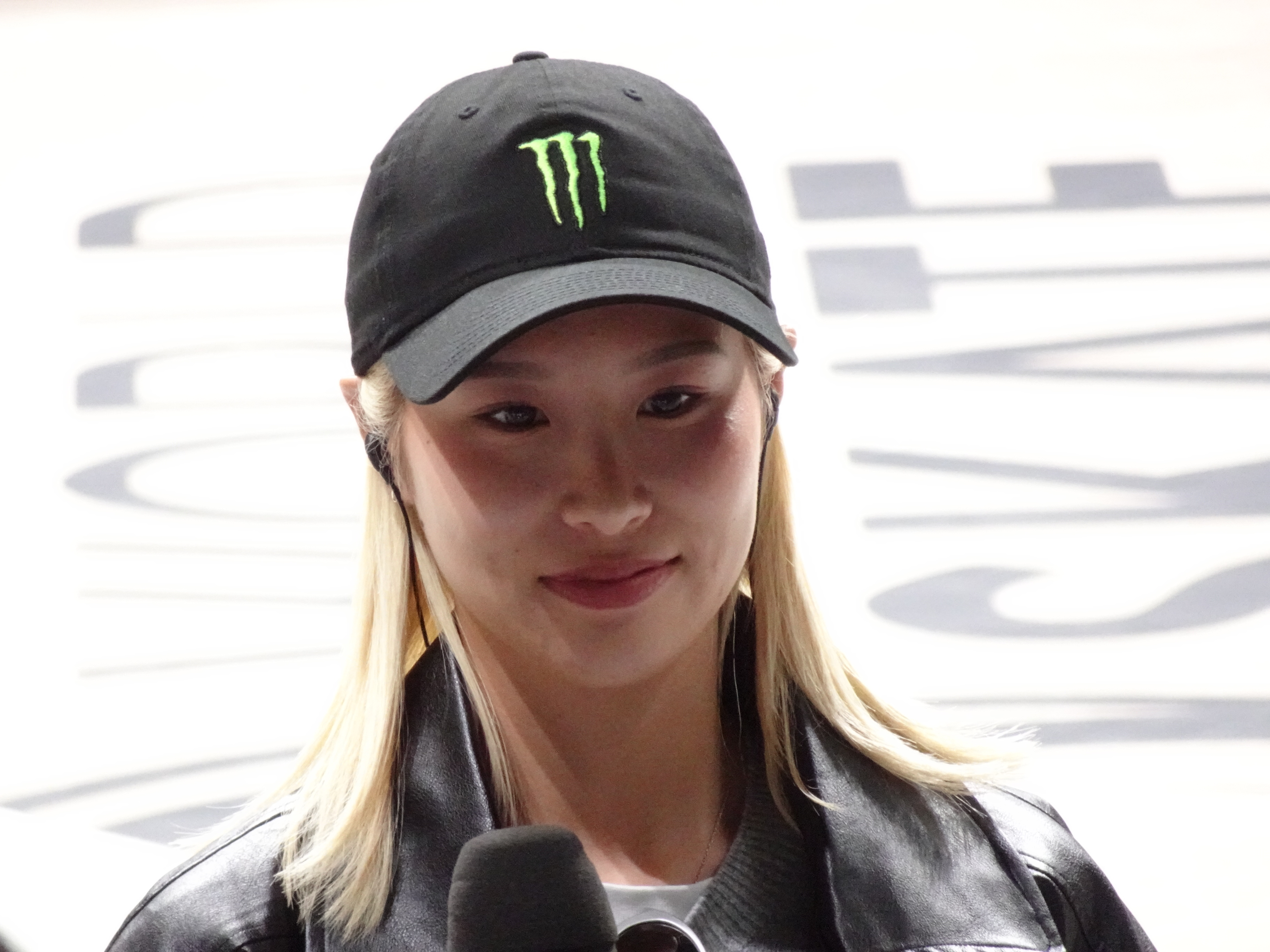

Personal information
- Native name: 西村 碧莉 (Kanji) にしむら あおり (Kana)
- Nationality: Japanese
- Born: 31 July 2001 (age 24) Edogawa, Tokyo, Japan
- Occupation: Skateboarder
- Spouse: Rinku Konishi (m. 2025)
- Children: 1

Sport
- Country: Japan
- Sport: Skateboarding
- Position: Regular-footed
- Rank: 3rd
- Event: Street

Achievements and titles
- Olympic finals: 8th (2020)
- National finals: 1st Japan National Skateboarding Championships 2017: Women's street; Gold
Medal record
Women's street skateboarding
Representing Japan
World Championships
Gold medal – first place	2018 Rio de Janeiro	Street
Gold medal – first place	2020 Rome	Street
Bronze medal – third place	2019 São Paulo	Street
X Games
Gold medal – first place	2019 Minneapolis
Gold medal – first place	2019 Norway
Gold medal – first place	2017 Minneapolis
Silver medal – second place	2018 Minneapolis
Bronze medal – third place	2018 Sydney

Nishimura Aori (西村 碧莉; born 31 July 2001) is a Japanese regular-footed professional street skateboarder. Nishimura represented Japan in the women's street event at the 2020 Olympic Games in Tokyo.

== Biography ==
Born in Edogawa, Tokyo, Nishimura Aori started skating at the age of seven, in 2008.

She made her professional debut when she was in fifth grade in a tournament organized by the All-Japan Skateboarding Association.

== Professional skateboarding ==
In 2017, Nishimura won the Japan National Skateboarding Championship. Furthermore, she was the first athlete from Japan to win gold at the X Games Minneapolis 2017 extreme sports event held in Minneapolis.

In October 2017, three months after her victory, Nishimura suffered an ACL injury in her left knee for which she had to undergo reconstructive ligament surgery and temporarily move away from skateboarding. After six months of rehabilitation, she returned to training in June 2018 and returned to competitions in July 2018.

She was invited to the Dew Tour Long Beach tournament, where she was eighth among the eight participants. On that occasion she expressed her dissatisfaction with the results obtained; however, that same month, she would achieve an evolution and take the silver medal in the X Games Minneapolis 2018, where Mariah Duran took first place.

In January 2019, in Rio de Janeiro, Brazil, she was crowned world skateboarding champion in the World Skateboarding Championship, which was jointly organized by World Skate and Street League Skateboarding (SLS). Nishimura eclipsed hometown favorite, Letícia Bufoni, who won the silver medal.

Nishimura appears as one of the new playable skateboarders in the 2020 game Tony Hawk's Pro Skater 1 + 2.

=== Awards ===
- Bronze medal - World Skateboarding Championship (São Paulo, 2019)
- Gold medal - X Games Norway (2019)
- Gold medal - X Games Minneapolis (2019)
- Women's world champion of street skateboarding (Street League Skateboarding Tournament, Rio, 2018)
- Silver medal - X Games Minneapolis 2018
- Bronze medal - X Games Sydney - (2018)
- Japanese street skateboarding champion (2017)
- Gold medal - X Games Minneapolis 2017

== Personal life ==
Aori has two sisters, who are also dedicated to skateboarding: Sana and Kotone.

She was previously in a relationship with Brazilian skateboarder Lucas Rabelo.

Nishimura married Japanese skateboarder Rinku Konishi on July 31, 2025. They have one child.
