= Giovanni Vianna =

Brazilian skateboarder (born 2001)

Personal information
- Born: 26 January 2001 (age 25) Santo André, Brazil

Sport
- Country: Brazil
- Sport: Skateboarding
- Rank: 15th – street
Medal record
Representing Brazil
X Games
Gold medal – first place	2018 Minneapolis	Next X Skateboard Street

Giovanni Vianna (born 26 January 2001) is a Brazilian professional skateboarder. He currently resides in the United States.

== Career ==
He won the Next X Skateboard Street event at the X Games Minneapolis 2018. He is also a member of Primitive Skateboarding company. He turned professional in 2020.

He made his debut appearance in the Olympics representing Brazil at the 2020 Summer Olympics where skateboarding was also added in Olympics for the very first time. During the 2020 Summer Olympics, he competed in men's street event.
