= Paige Heyn =

American skateboarder (born 2008)

Personal information
- Born: January 20, 2008 (age 18)
- Home town: Tempe, Arizona, U.S.

Sport
- Country: United States
- Sport: Street skateboarding
- Rank: 10th
Medal record
Street skateboarding
Representing United States
Pan American Games
Bronze medal – third place	2023 Santiago	Street

Paige Heyn (/ˈhaɪn/ HYNE; born January 20, 2008) is an American skateboarder, who won the 2022 USA Skateboarding National title and who competed at the 2024 Summer Olympics.

== Biography ==
Heyn was born January 20, 2008. Her hometown is Tempe, Arizona.

== Skateboarding ==
Heyn started skateboarding at four years old. She trained at Kids That Rip (KTR), an indoor action sports center owned by the family of Olympic medalist Jagger Eaton.

Heyn finished 5th in the Quarterfinal Results at the 2022 World Skateboarding Championships in Sharjah. In December 2022, Paige Heyn came in first place at the USA Skateboarding National Championships.

In March 2023, she finished second-place at the Cowtown's PHXAM in Phoenix, Arizona. In December 2023, Heyn participated in the WST Street World Championships in Japan, where she scored a 31.17 in the Women's Open Qualifier and a 46.51 in the Women's quarter-final.

In 2024, Heyn finished 5th in Women's Skateboard Street at the X Games in Ventura, California. She also represented the United States as a member of the USA Skateboarding National Team at the 2024 Summer Olympics, where she competed in the women's street skating and came in 6th place with 163.23 points.
