= Chloe Covell =

Australian skateboarder

Personal information
- Born: 8 February 2010 (age 16) Tweed Heads, New South Wales, Australia
- Parent: Luke Covell (father)

Sport
- Country: Australia
- Sport: Street skateboarding
- Rank: 5th
Medal record
Street skateboarding
Representing Australia
World Championships
Silver medal – second place	2022 Sharjah	Street
World Skate Games
Silver medal – second place	2026 Asunción	Street
X Games
Gold medal – first place	2023 California	Street
Gold medal – first place	2024 Chiba	Street
Gold medal – first place	2025 Osaka	Street
Gold medal – first place	2025 Salt Lake City	Street
Gold medal – first place	2025 Salt Lake City	Street Best Trick
Gold medal – first place	2026 Chiba	Street
Silver medal – second place	2022 California	Street
Silver medal – second place	2026 Sacramento	Street
Bronze medal – third place	2022 Chiba	Street
Bronze medal – third place	2023 California	Street Best Trick
Bronze medal – third place	2026 Chiba	Street Best Trick

Chloe Covell (/kəˈvɛl/ kə-VEL; born 8 February 2010) is an Australian skateboarder. She competed in the women's street event at the 2024 Summer Olympics.

== Early life ==
Covell was born in Tweed Heads, New South Wales and grew up on the southern Gold Coast where she began skating at the age of six and received a skateboard as a Christmas gift. She is the daughter of Julie and Luke Covell, a former professional rugby league player for Cronulla and the Wests Tigers.

== Career ==
In July 2023, Covell became the youngest X Games gold medallist when she was victorious in the women's street event at the age of 13.
