= Sora Shirai =

Japanese professional skateboarder

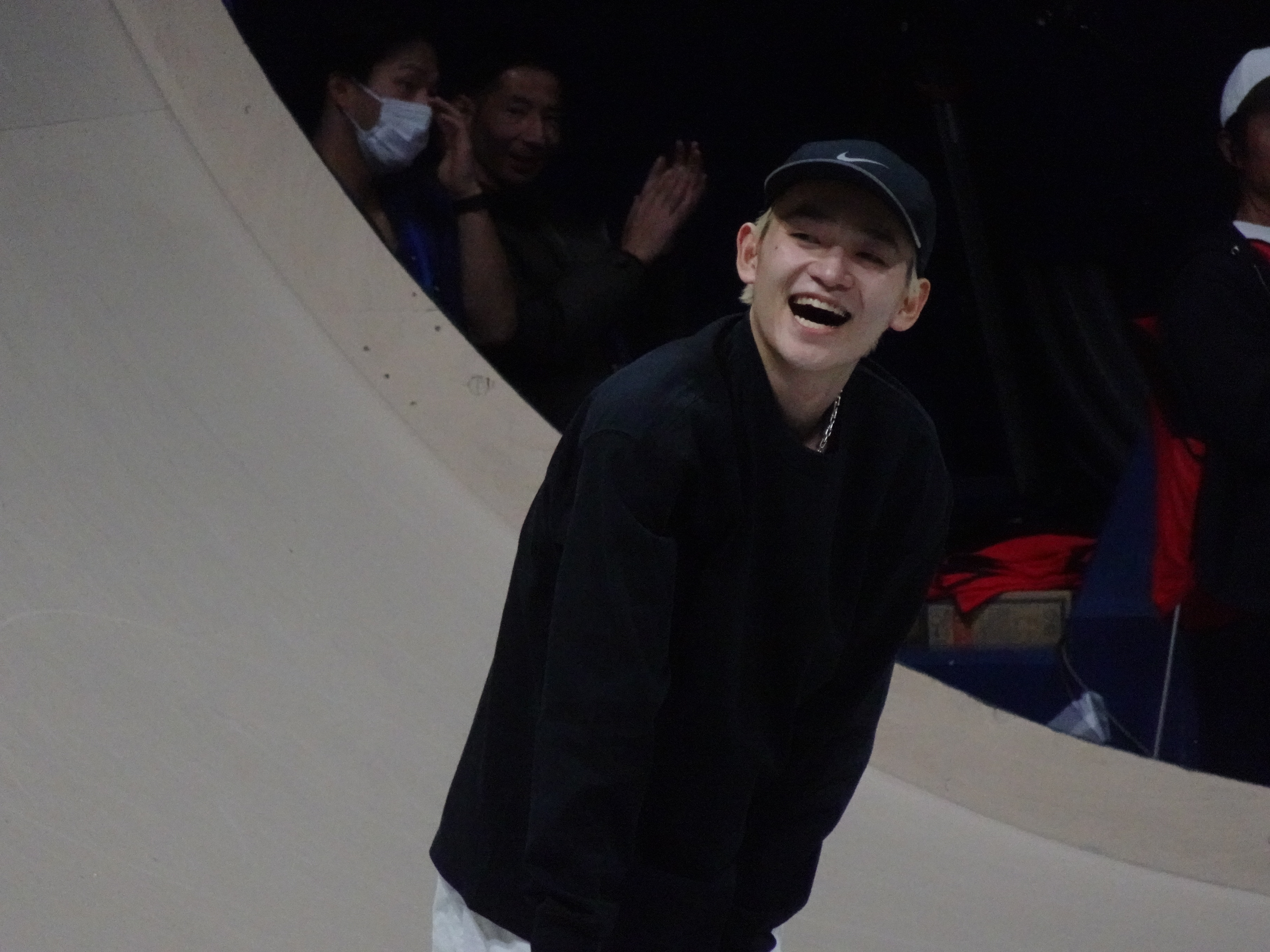
- Shirai in 2023

Personal information
- Native name: 白井 空良
- Born: 3 November 2001 (age 24) Sagamihara, Japan

Sport
- Country: Japan
- Sport: Skateboarding
- Position: Goofy-footed
- Rank: 2nd – street (August 2024)
Medal record
Men's street skateboarding
Representing Japan
World Championships
Gold medal – first place	2023 Tokyo	Street
Bronze medal – third place	2021 Rome	Street
Bronze medal – third place	2025 São Paulo	Street
X Games
Gold medal – first place	2024 Chiba	Street
Bronze medal – third place	2019 Minneapolis	Street
Bronze medal – third place	2022 Chiba	Street
Bronze medal – third place	2026 Chiba	Street

Sora Shirai (白井 空良, Shirai Sora; born 3 November 2001) is a Japanese professional skateboarder who lives and skates in Kanagawa, Japan. In 2019, at the age of 17, Shirai released his first full length professional skateboarding skate part in the Blind Skateboards video Time Change.

== Skateboarding career ==
=== Skate video parts ===
- 2019: Time Change - Blind

=== Competitions ===
==== 2019 ====
- Damn Am Japan: 1st
- Skate Ark Japan: 1st
- Dew Tour - Long Beach (street): 2nd
- X Games Minneapolis (street): 3rd
