= Bastien Salabanzi =

French professional skateboarder

Bastien Salabanzi (18 November 1985 (age 40) in Toulon, France) is a French professional skateboarder whose stance is regular.

== Skateboarding career ==
Salabanzi started skateboarding when he was 9, and soon after gained his first sponsorship by the Skateshop of Toulon. He won his first contest at the age of 11 in Marseille, France. After that, Vans flew him to the finals in California, his first trip to the United States.

=== 2000s ===
In 2001 at the age of 15 he won the World cup in Dortmund (Globe Shoes World Skateboarding Championships 2001, 2002, 2003). Also in 2001, he came in 2nd at the Tampa AM 2001 Street Finals, and three years later he got 1st place at the Tampa Pro 2004 Street Fi and 2nd place the following year in the same event. Salabanzi finished third in the street skateboarding event at the 2004 X Games.

He won the WSR05 skateboarding contest in Rotterdam, Netherlands in 2005. In 2006, he got 1st on the Mystic Skate Cup in Prague - the famous contest from the World Cup series held traditionally in Prague- for best trick out of 13 skaters, and then he placed 5th out of 40 on the same competition's street finals. He also won 3x the World cup in Dortmund (Globe Shoes World Skateboarding Championships 2001, 2002, 2003) from the age of 15.

Around 2006, Salabanzi returned to France after parting ways with a number of his sponsors. Between 2006 and 2008, Bastien only skated in one more competition, the Copenhagen Pro 2007 Street Finals, where he got 1st place on the Final stage after getting 2nd place in the Qualifiers.

In 2008 Salabanzi returned to professional skateboarding in the Globe Metz Master contest, in which he placed first after landing a caballerial double flip.

=== 2010s ===
In the 2010 Maloof Money Cup that was held in New York City, U.S., Salabanzi placed fourth in the professional contest.

Salabanzi joined the Street League in 2012 after a video part competition that was held at the DC embassy. In his first year, he placed second in Kansas City and sixth in the overall rankings.

In January 2015, Primitive Skateboards announced Salabanzi as their newest pro .

In April 2015 Salabanzi lost the first round in the "Battle at the Berrics" elimination skate contest against Christopher Chann. https://web.archive.org/web/20150711164746/http://theberrics.com/battle-at-the-berrics-8/batb-8-bastien-salabanzi-vs-chris-chann

== Sponsors ==
=== Current ===
- Shaped By Delta
- Haze Wheels
- Film trucks
- Souljah Grip Tape
- Lakai Footwear
