= Keet Oldenbeuving =

Dutch skateboarder (born 2004)

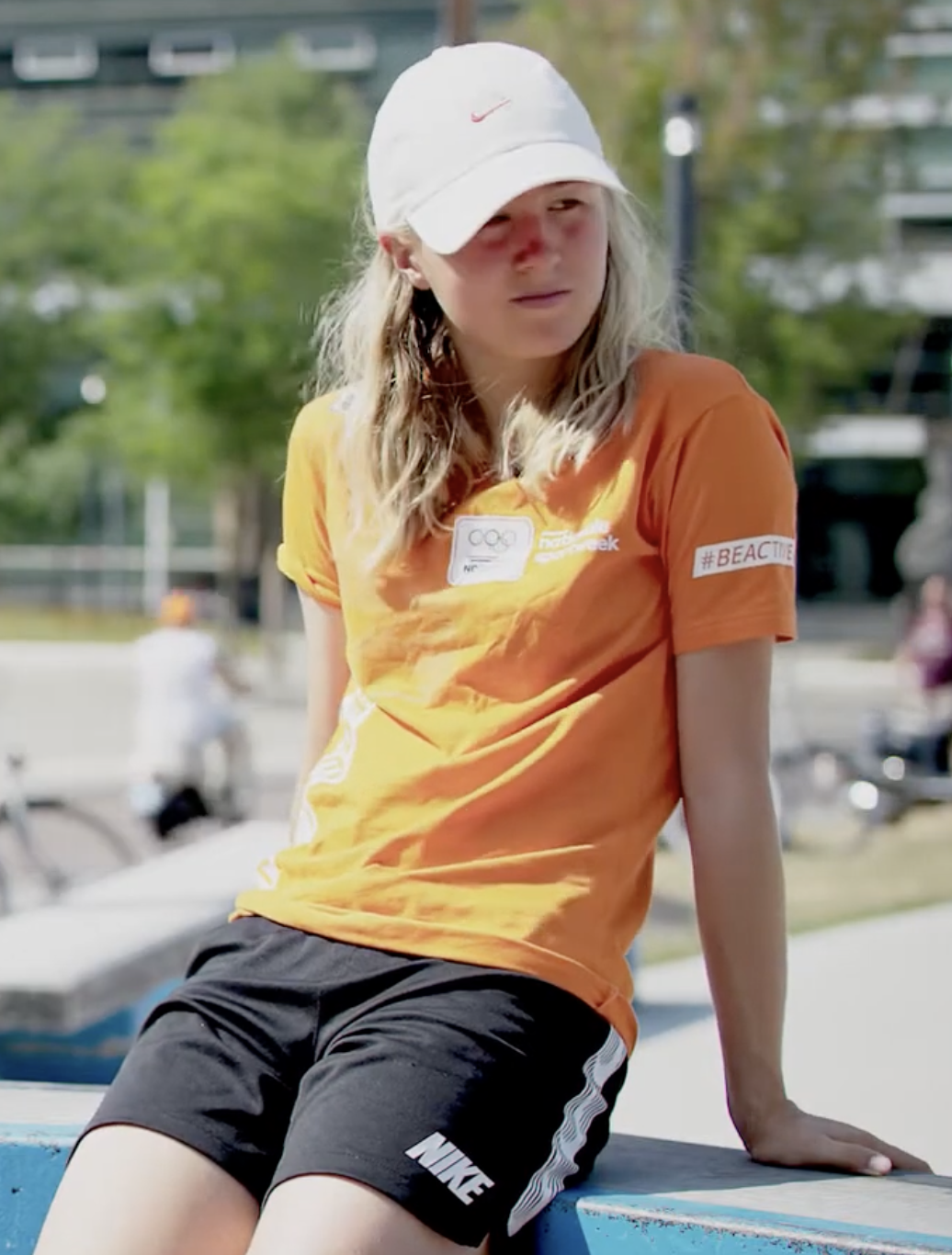
- Keet Oldenbeuving during an interview at a skatepark in 2020

Personal information
- Born: 1 September 2004 (age 22) Utrecht, Netherlands

Sport
- Country: Netherlands
- Sport: Skateboarding
- Rank: 19th

Keet Oldenbeuving (born 1 September 2004) is a Dutch skateboarder.

She is the youngest Dutch athlete at the 2020 Summer Olympics. Together with the Dutch oldest sprinter Churandy Martina she was the flagbearer at the 2020 Summer Olympics Parade of Nations during the opening ceremony.

She competed in the women's street event at the 2020 Summer Olympics.
