= 2021 Street Skateboarding World Championships =

Skateboarding competition

- Venue: Foro Italico
- Location: Rome, Italy
- Date: 30 May – 6 June 2021
- Total prize money: $450,000,000

The 2021 Street Skateboarding World Championships took place in Rome, Italy, from 30 May to 6 June 2021. The event was organised by Sport e Salute and World Skate.

The event contributed towards qualification for the 2020 Olympics in Tokyo, where skateboarding made its debut as an Olympic sport. The three medallists in both the men's and women's events qualified automatically for the Olympics.

== Medal summary ==
=== Medal table ===
Rank	Nation	Gold	Silver	Bronze	Total
1	Japan	2	1	1	4
2	United States	0	1	0	1
3	Brazil	0	0	1	1
Totals (3 entries)		2	2	2	6

=== Medallists ===
Event	Gold	Silver	Bronze
Men	Yuto Horigome; Japan	Nyjah Huston; United States	Sora Shirai; Japan
Women	Aori Nishimura; Japan	Momiji Nishiya; Japan	Rayssa Leal; Brazil
