= Aurélien Giraud =

French skateboarder (born 1998)

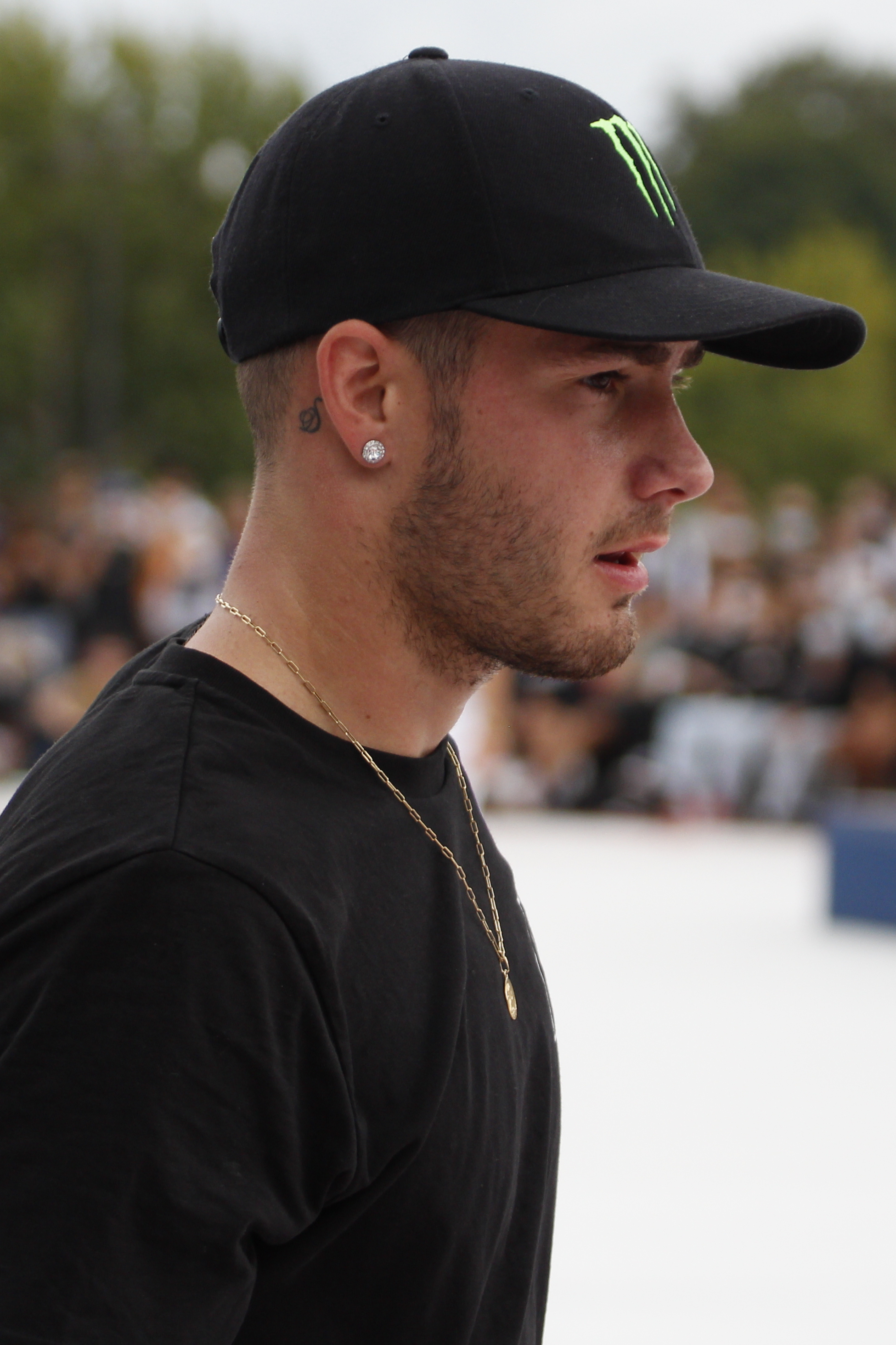
- Giraud in 2021

Personal information
- Born: 3 February 1998 (age 28) Lyon, France
- Height: 5 ft 10 in (178 cm)
- Weight: 150 lb (68 kg)

Sport
- Country: France
- Sport: Skateboarding
- Position: Goofy-footed
- Rank: 13th
- Event: Street

Achievements and titles
- Olympic finals: 2020 Summer Olympics: Men's street – 6th
Medal record
Men's street skateboarding
Representing France
World Championships
Gold medal – first place	2023 Sharjah	Street

Aurélien Giraud (born 3 February 1998) is a French goofy-footed professional street skateboarder from Lyon.

== Achievements and highlights ==
Year	Event	Event Location	Event	Place
2024	2024 Olympics	Paris, France	Men's street	16th
2021	2020 Olympics	Tokyo, Japan	Men's street	6th
2021	Dew Tour	Des Moines, Iowa, US	Men's street	3rd
2019	World Cup Skateboarding	Paris, France	Men's street	1st
2019	Dew Tour	Long Beach, California, US	Men's street	1st
2018	World Cup Skateboarding	Tallinn, Estonia	Men's street	15th
2017	World Cup Skateboarding	Vigo, Spain	Men's street	1st
