= Ryan Decenzo =

Canadian skateboarder

Personal information
- Nationality: Canadian
- Born: July 20, 1986 (age 40) Burnaby, British Columbia, Canada

Sport
- Sport: Skateboarding
- Rank: 19th
Medal record
Men's Skateboarding
Representing Canada

Ryan Decenzo (born July 20, 1986) is a Canadian skateboarder competing in the street discipline.

== Career ==
Decenzo has competed at over 20 X-Games and has won multiple medals.

In 2022, Decenzo in collaboration with Red Bull, completed a 20-foot creek gap in the wilderness, landing a kickflip and frontside flip using plywood. This marked his continued effort to take skateboarding into natural environments.

In August 2023, Decenzo was named to Canada's 2023 Pan American Games team. Decenzo finished in fourth place in the street event at the games. In July 2024, Decenzo was named to Canada's 2024 Olympic team. Decenzo is currently managed by Superheroes Management.
