= Street skateboarding =

Sport discipline

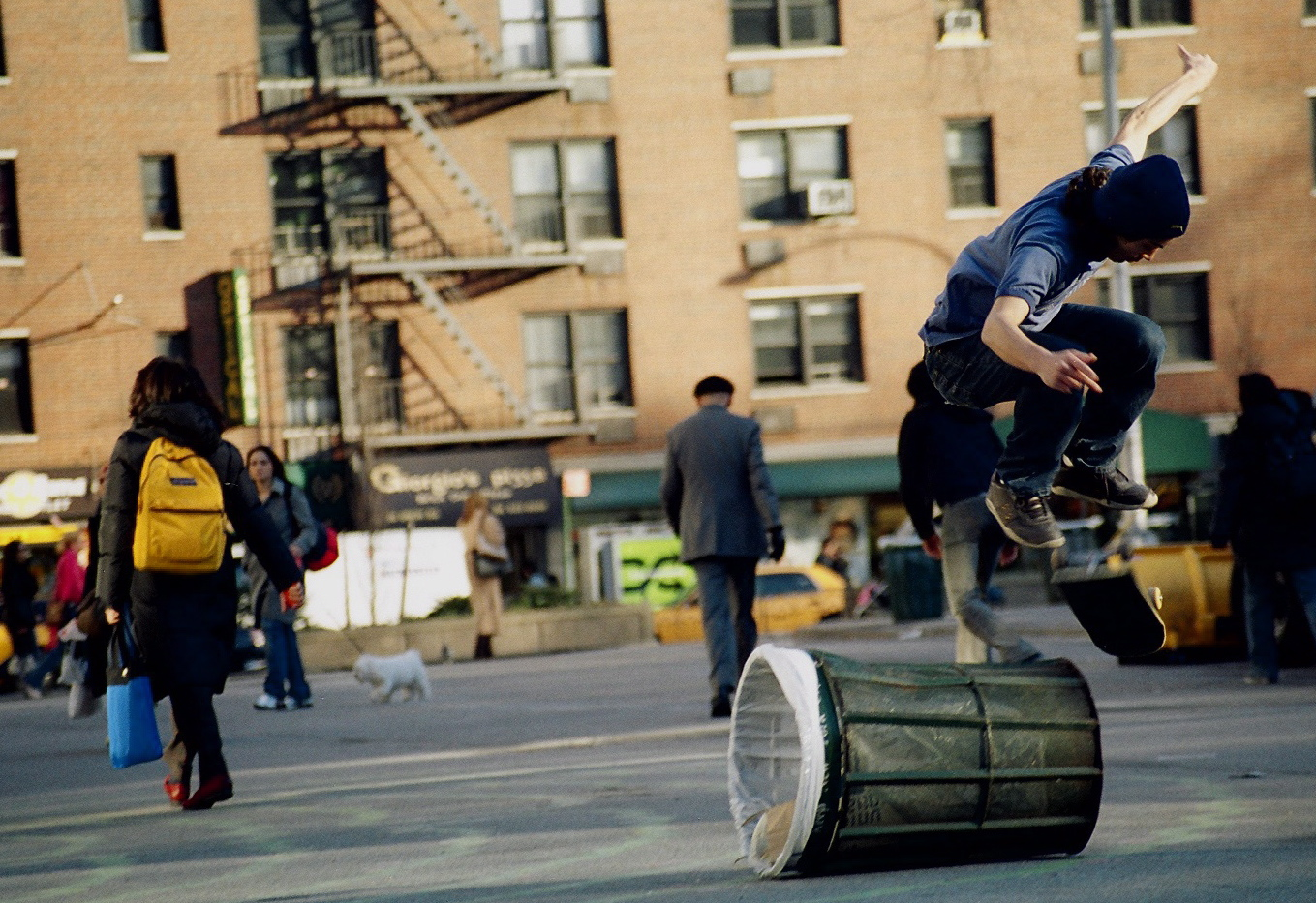
A flip over a bin at a spot in New York City

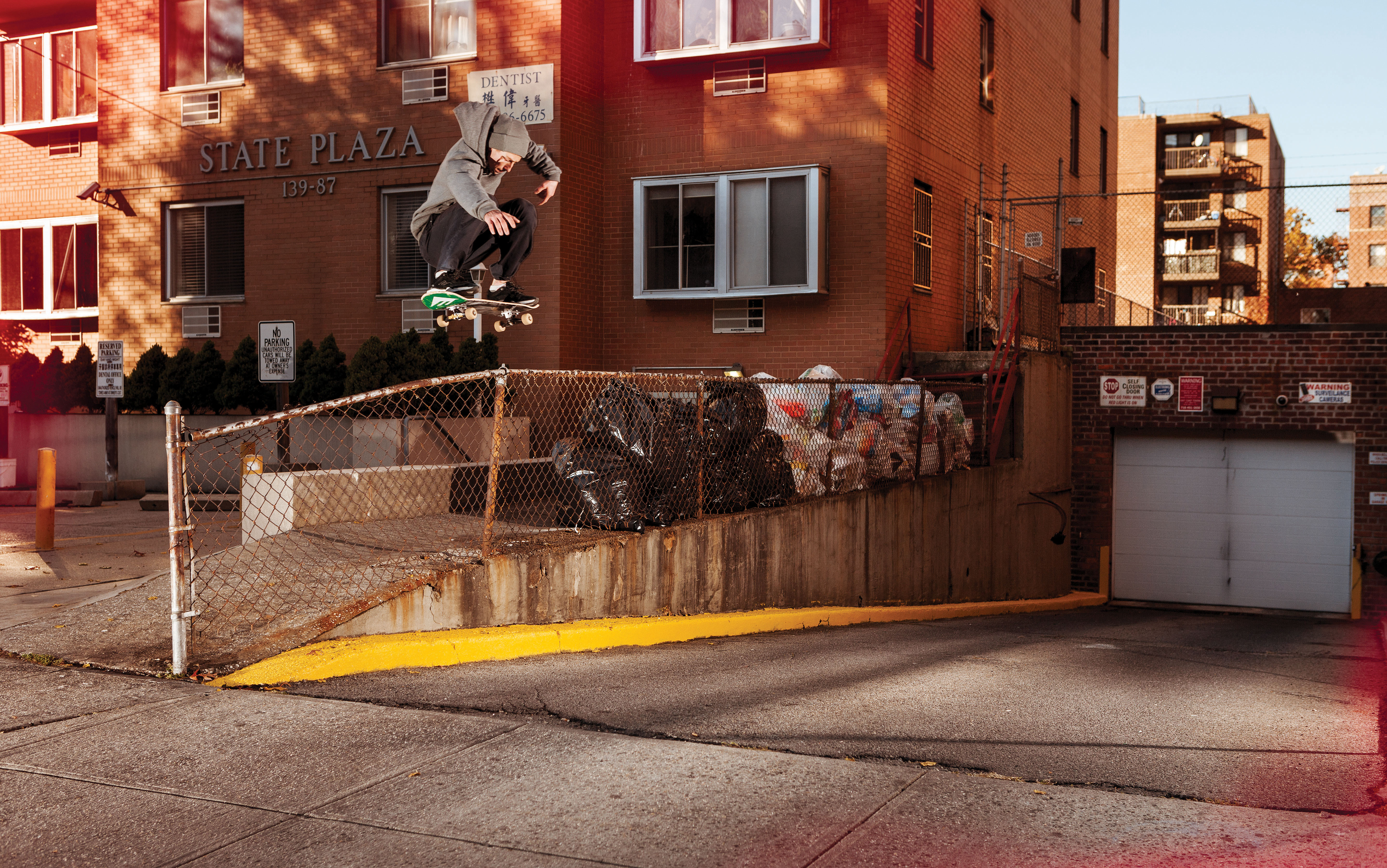
Brandon Westgate doing a frontside flip in Queens, New York City

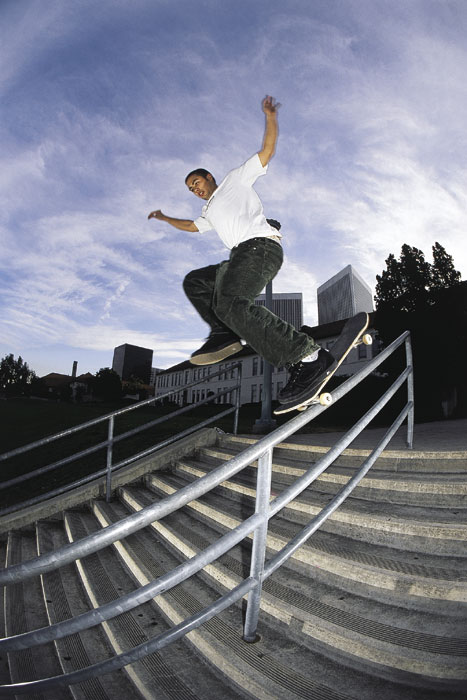
Eric Koston grinding on a handrail

Street skateboarding is a skateboarding discipline which focuses on flat-ground tricks, grinds, slides and aerials within urban environments, and public spaces. Street skateboarders meet, skate, and hang out in and around urban areas referred to as "spots," which are commonly streets, plazas or industrial areas. To add variety and complexity to street skateboarding, obstacles such as handrails, stairs, walls, flower beds, bins, park benches, picnic tables, and other street furniture may be traversed as single tricks or as part of a series of consecutive tricks called a "line."

== History ==
During the late 1980s and early 1990s, street skateboarding evolved as a new approach to skateboarding, using elements taken from the other existing skateboarding disciplines. Instead of drained swimming pools and purpose-built skateparks, skateboarders began to use urban areas and public spaces. For example, in the 1980s, Philadelphia's LOVE Park transformed from a place where businesspeople would eat their lunch into a well-known skateboarding spot. A new style of skateboard deck (which had a kicktail at each end) became popular. Professional skateboarding became hyper-commercialized and skate shops specializing in the retail of professional grade skateboarding equipment appeared in many cities across the world. Skate shops, in turn, helped support a culture of street skateboarding by offering skateboarders a refuge where they could check out and buy copies of the latest skate videos (VHS video tapes and then later DVDs), magazines, or other skateboard products.

Many street skaters abandoned skate parks entirely in favor of public, urban areas. Street skaters began to observe architecture and look for skate-able obstacles.

According to Ben Kelly of Transworld Skateboarding Magazine, the ten best cities in the World to skateboard are: Barcelona, Los Angeles, New York City, San Francisco, Paris, Melbourne, London, Shenzhen, Berlin and Miami.

== Tricks ==
=== Examples of tricks ===
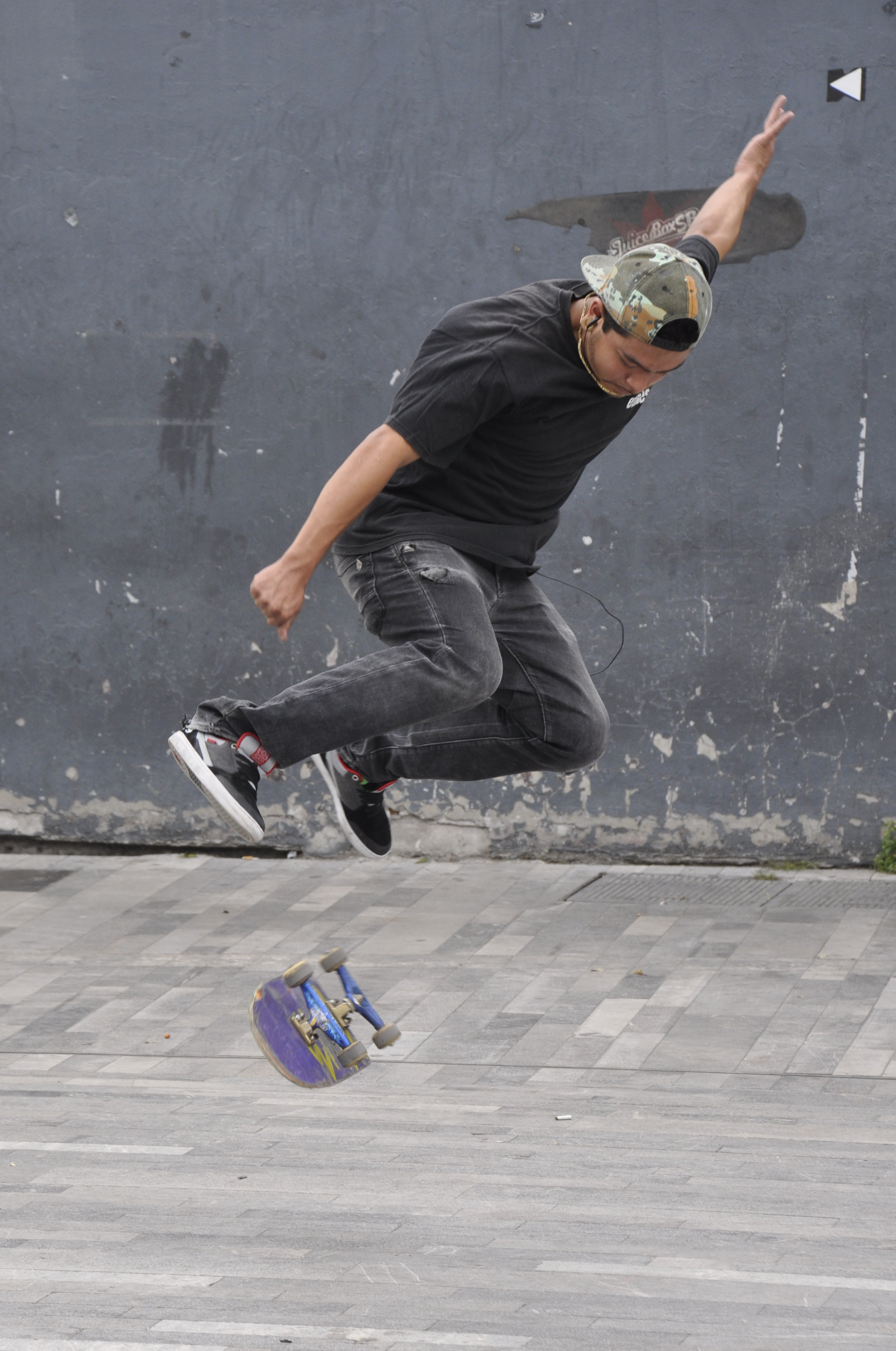
Kickflip

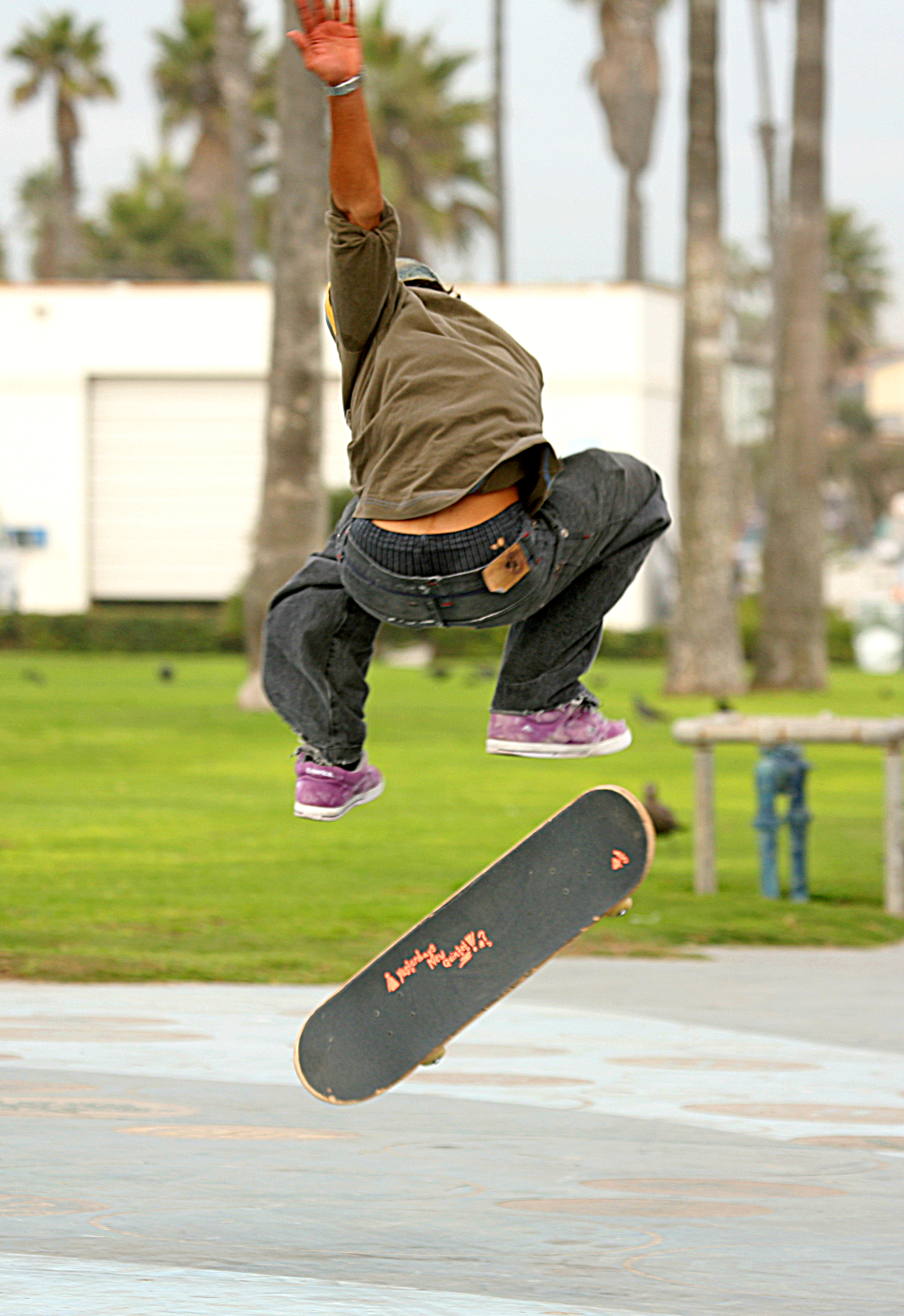
Hardflip

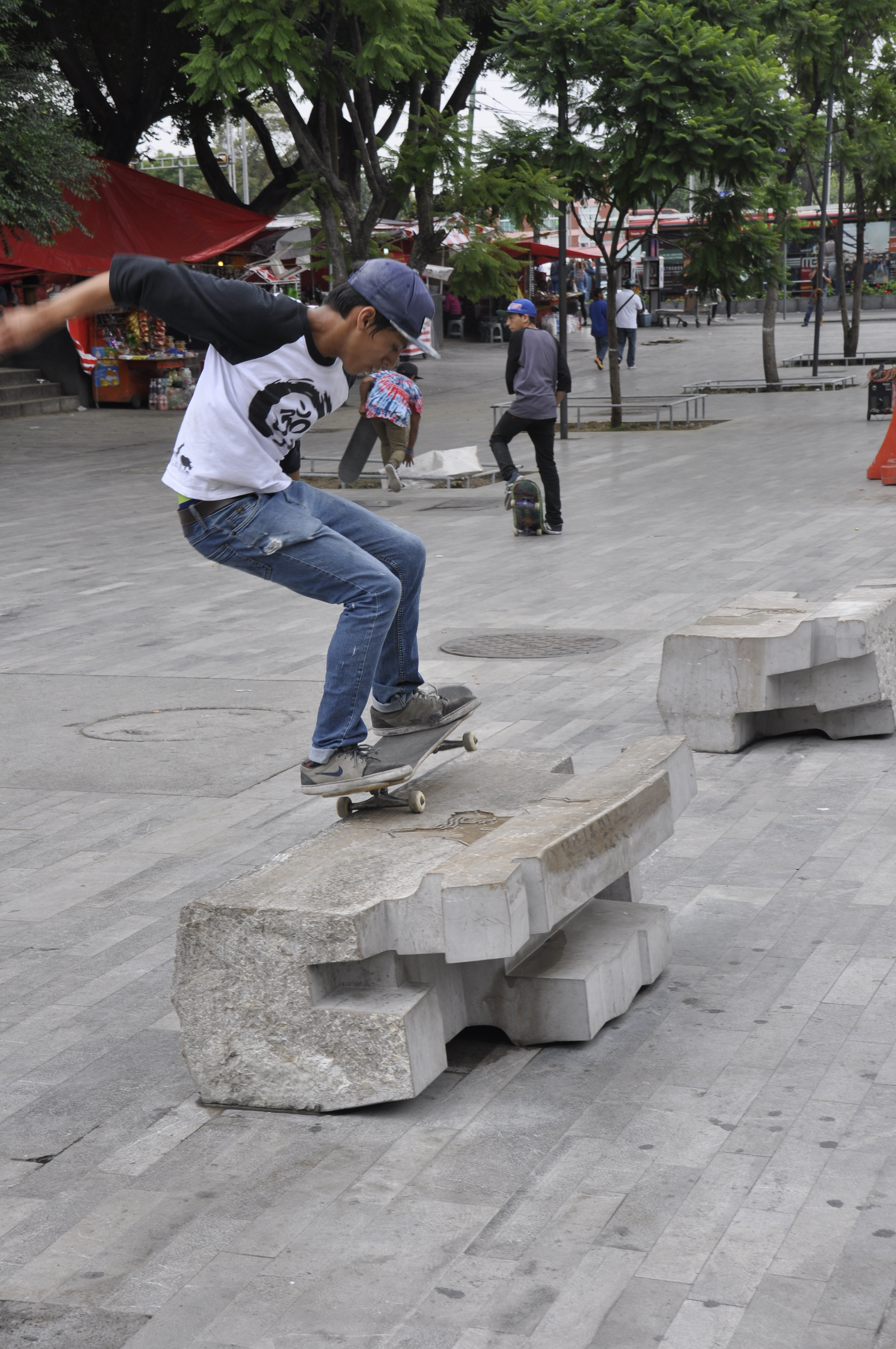
5-0 grind

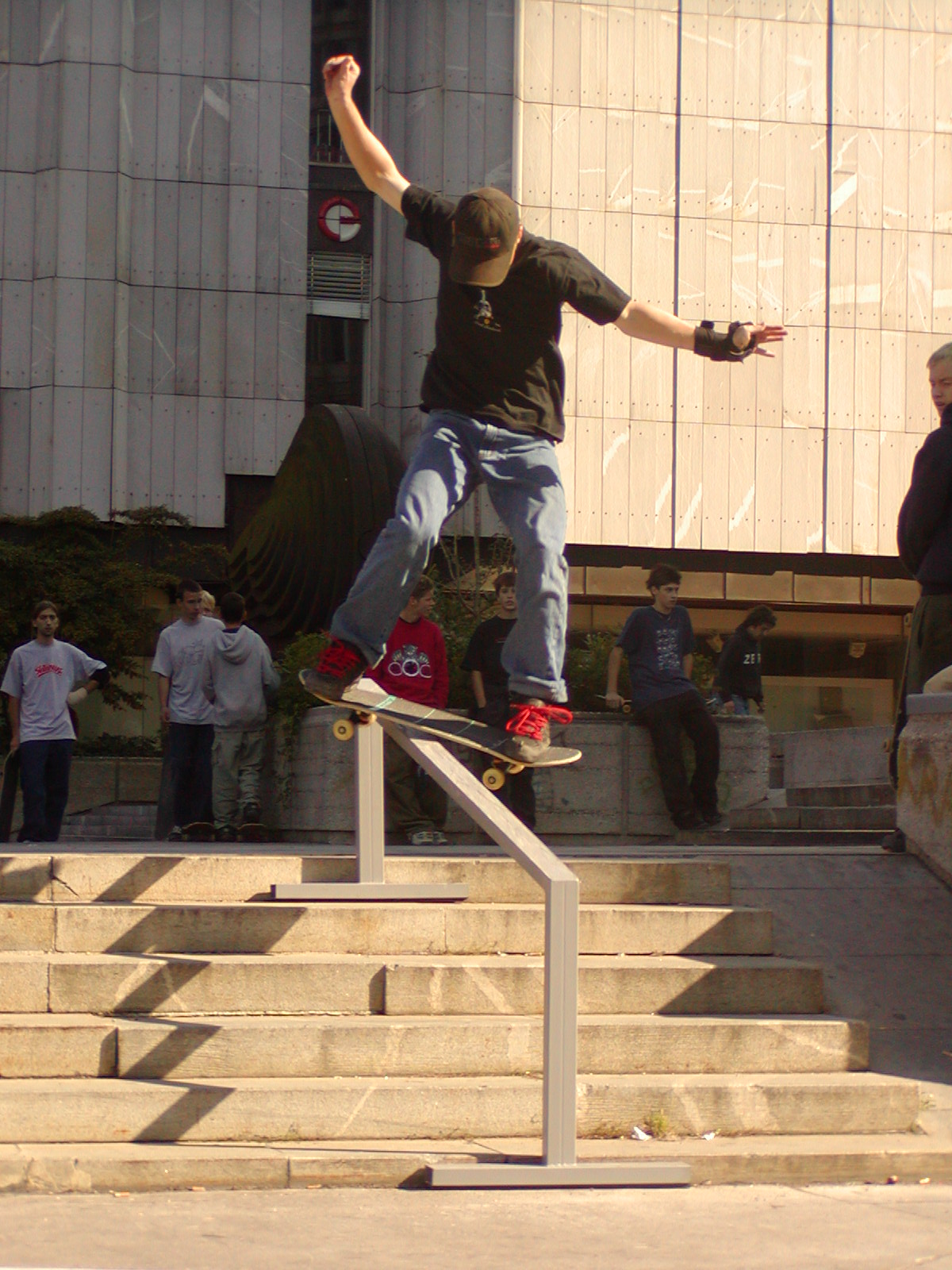
Boardslide

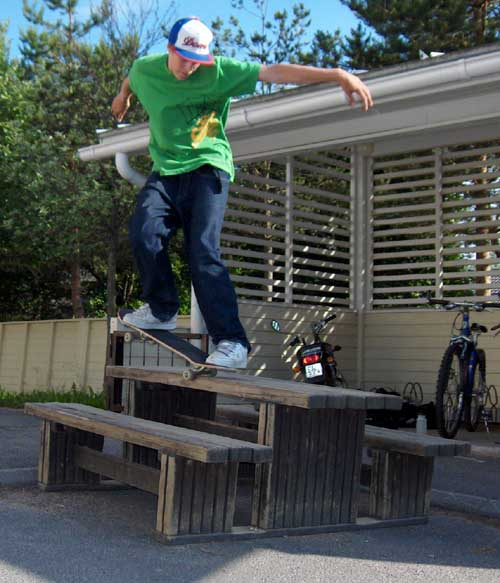
Nosegrind

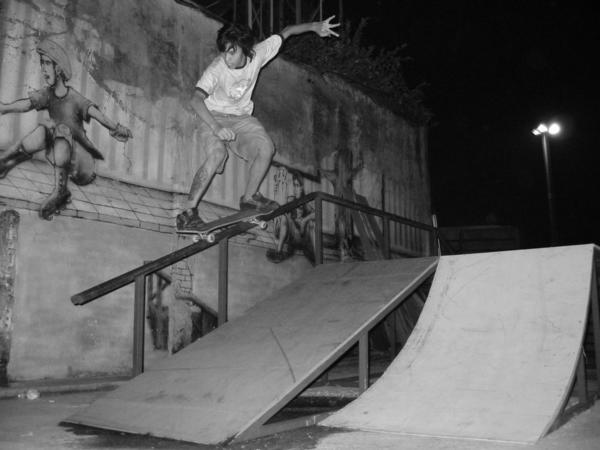
50-50 grind

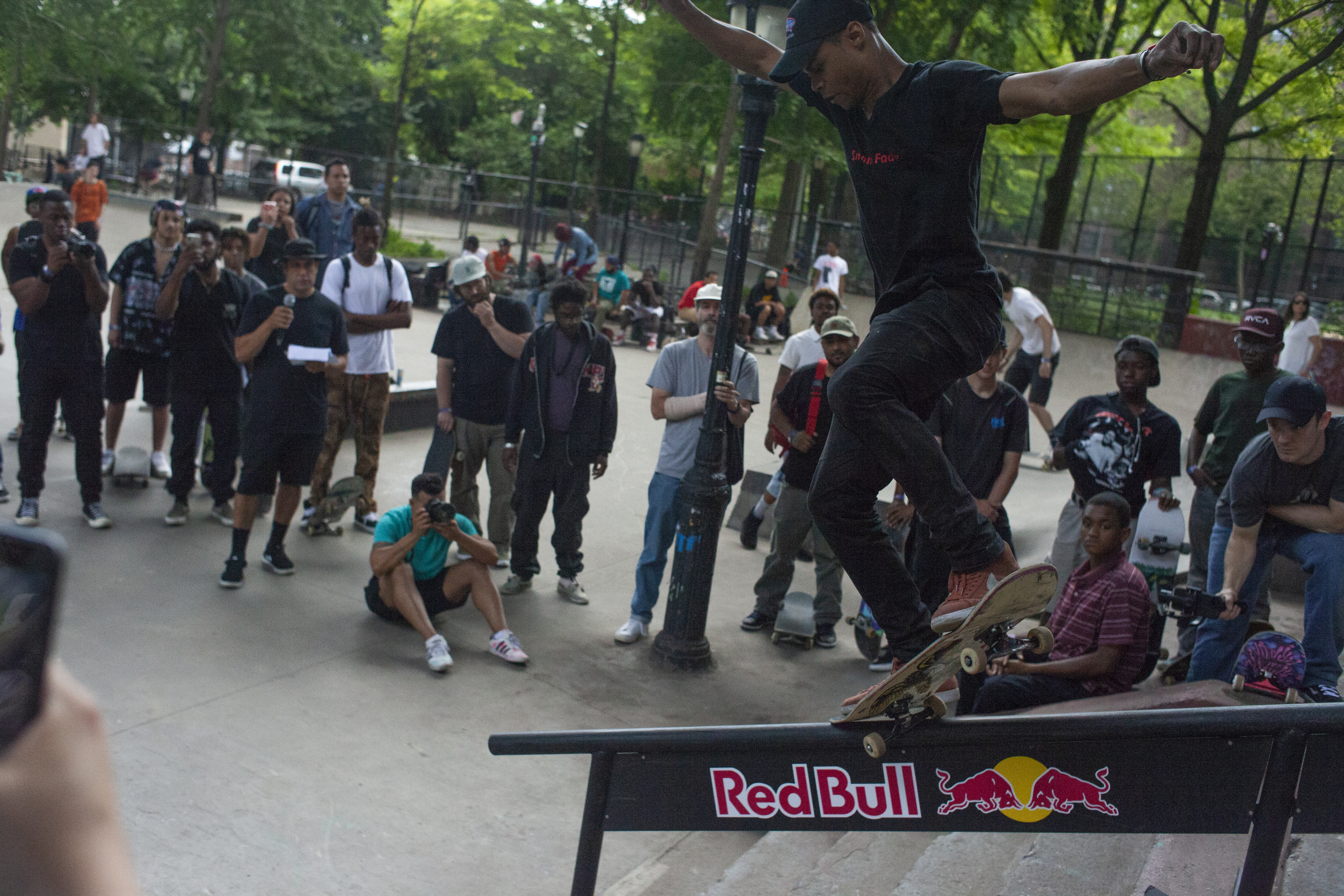
Crooked grind

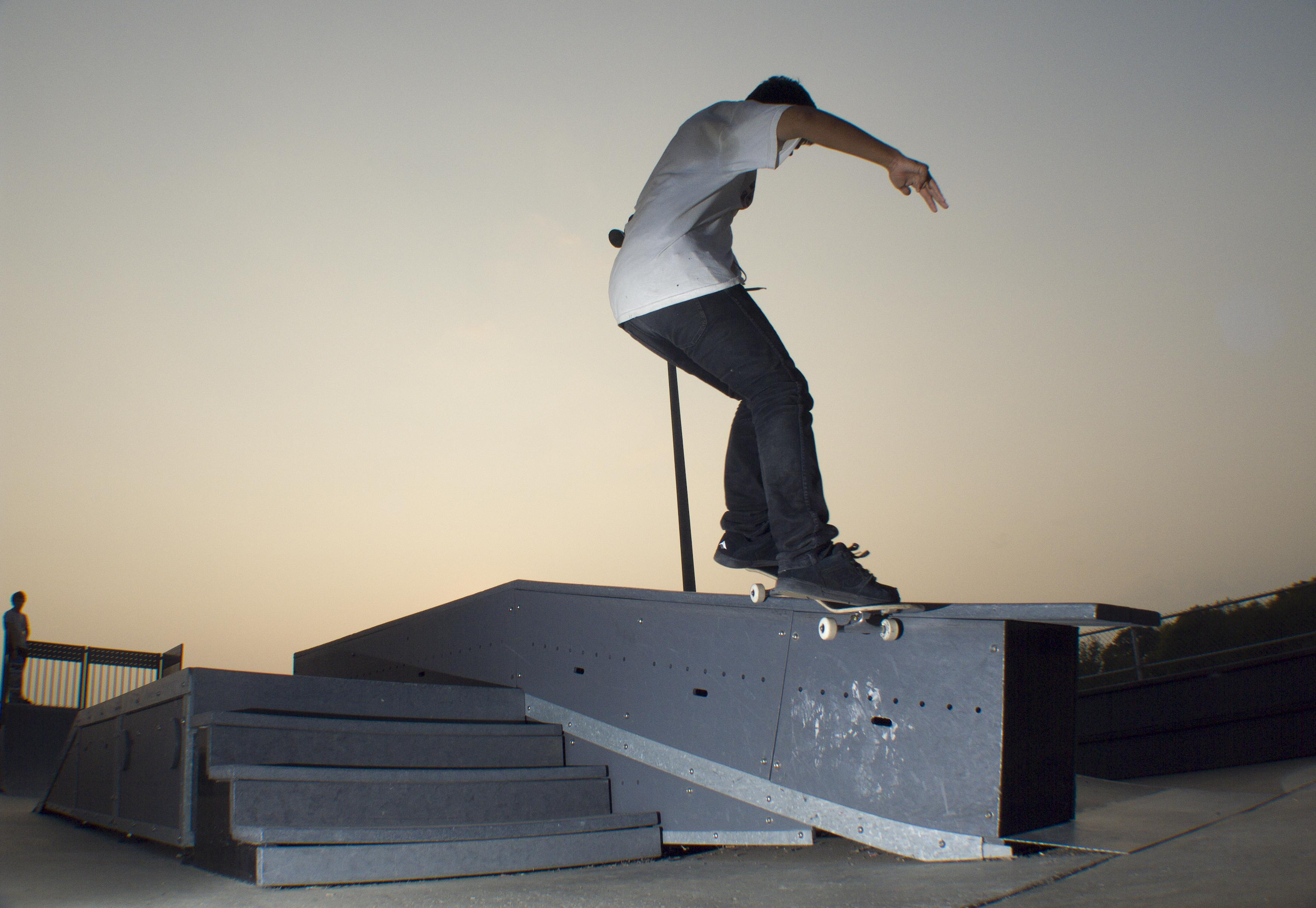
Smith grind

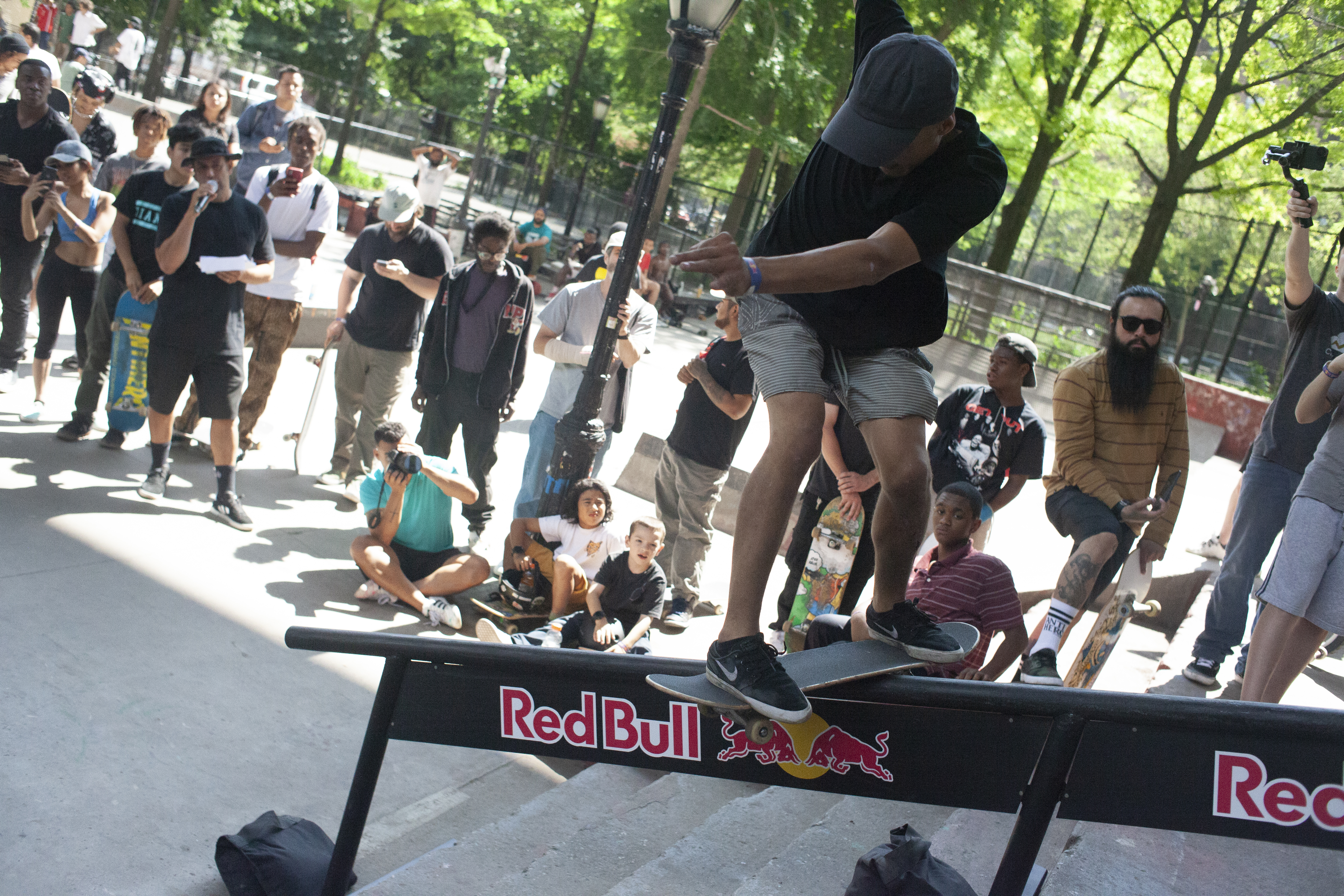
Lipslide

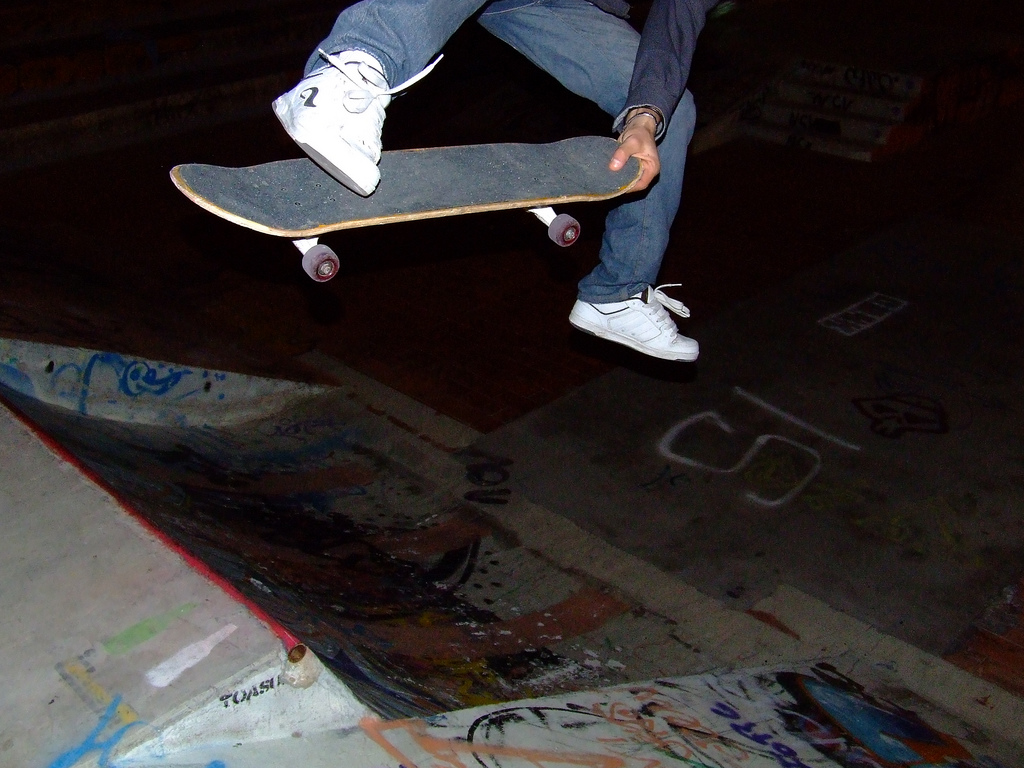
Benihana

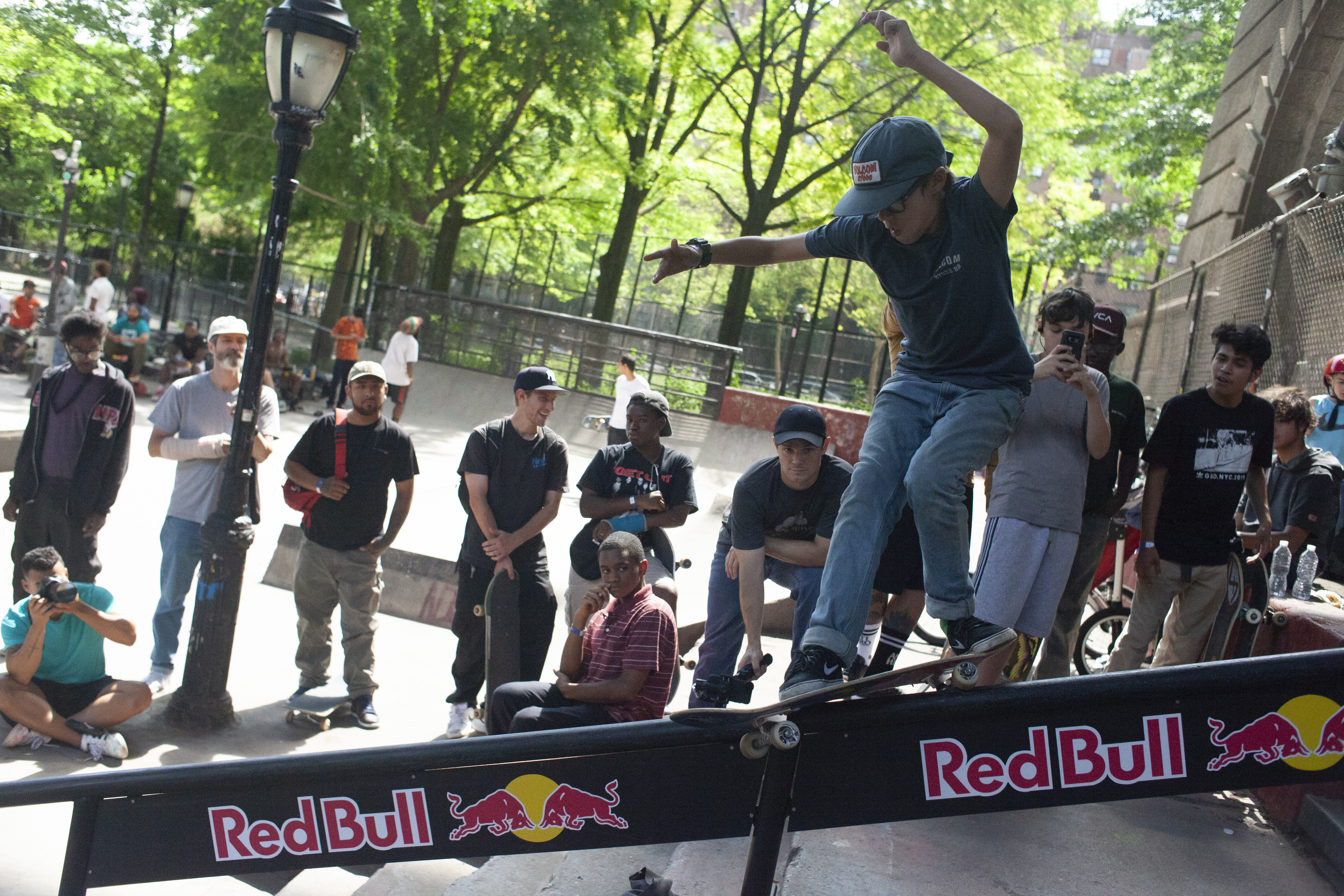
Feeble grind

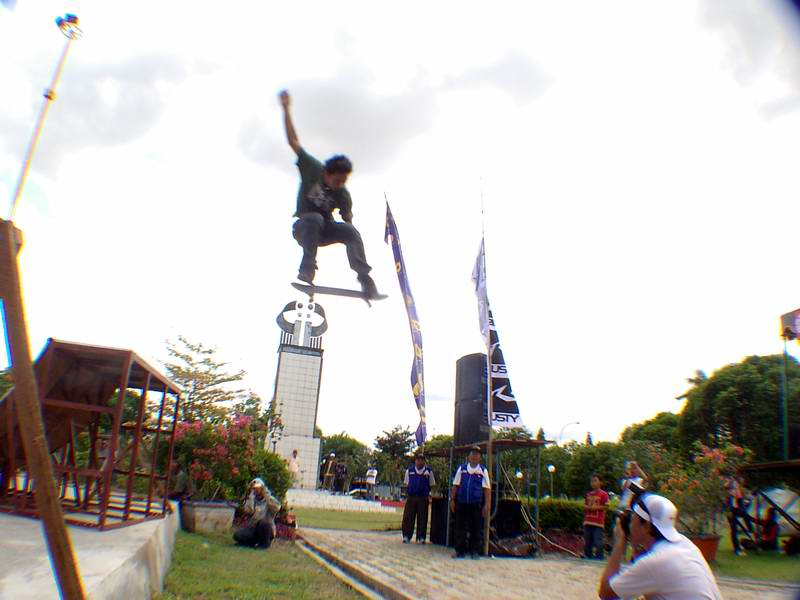
Ollie

In street skateboarding, tricks can be attempted in a variety of stances (normal, fakie, switch, or nollie) and while travelling either frontside or backside. Almost all of the tricks in street skateboarding require some amount of pop from either of the kicktails on the board to elevate the skateboard into the air. Skateboarding has unique terminology which is used by skaters to describe ride styles and trick names.

With practice, tricks such as many grinds and slides can be optionally combined with other aerial type tricks such as the kickflip to create variations. This creates some interesting combinations and often increases the difficulty level. The ways in which a particular skater combines various tricks, in part, forms their unique style.

Tricks can be judged in various ways. Common signs of skill include how cleanly the trick was completed, the height of the obstacle involved, how fast the rider was travelling, the length of travel while grinding or sliding, and the technical complexities involved in landing the trick. In street skateboarding, style is an important signifier of skill and individuality. For instance, professional skateboarder Tom Penny is renowned not just for his skill and ability on a skateboard but also for his smooth and relaxed style.

The most basic tricks in street skateboarding are grounded in the ollie. Learning to ollie and then moving onto other fundamentals such as the 180, pop shuv-it, and the kickflip creates a foundation necessary for learning slides, grinds, and variations. Discussing techniques, studying video footage, and watching other skaters are important ways for skateboarders to learn tricks.

Many advanced skateboarding tricks are extremely hard to pull off consistently, and in some instances, the skater risks serious injury in the event of a mistake. Many tricks can take years of careful practice to master.

== Equipment ==
Street skateboards are built using component parts sold by skateboard retailers. Throughout the 1990s and 2000s, skaters increasingly began to design, manufacture, and sell their own boards and parts. This resulted in diminished market share for venture capitalists, who dominated the industry in the 1980s. The industry has since come full circle, with many grassroots companies founded in the 1990s now being sold to venture capitalist groups and enterprises. However, there are still a number of skateboarder-owned companies manufacturing skateboard products today.

=== Skate shoes ===
Appropriate footwear is an important part of street skateboarding equipment. Modern professional-grade skate shoes evolved, in part, due to the need for increased durability to resist constant abrasion. Other innovations followed, such as designs meant to reduce the risk of heel bruises, increase "board feel," and further improve durability. These innovations have improved not only skate shoes but also modern footwear in general.

==== Examples of skate shoes ====
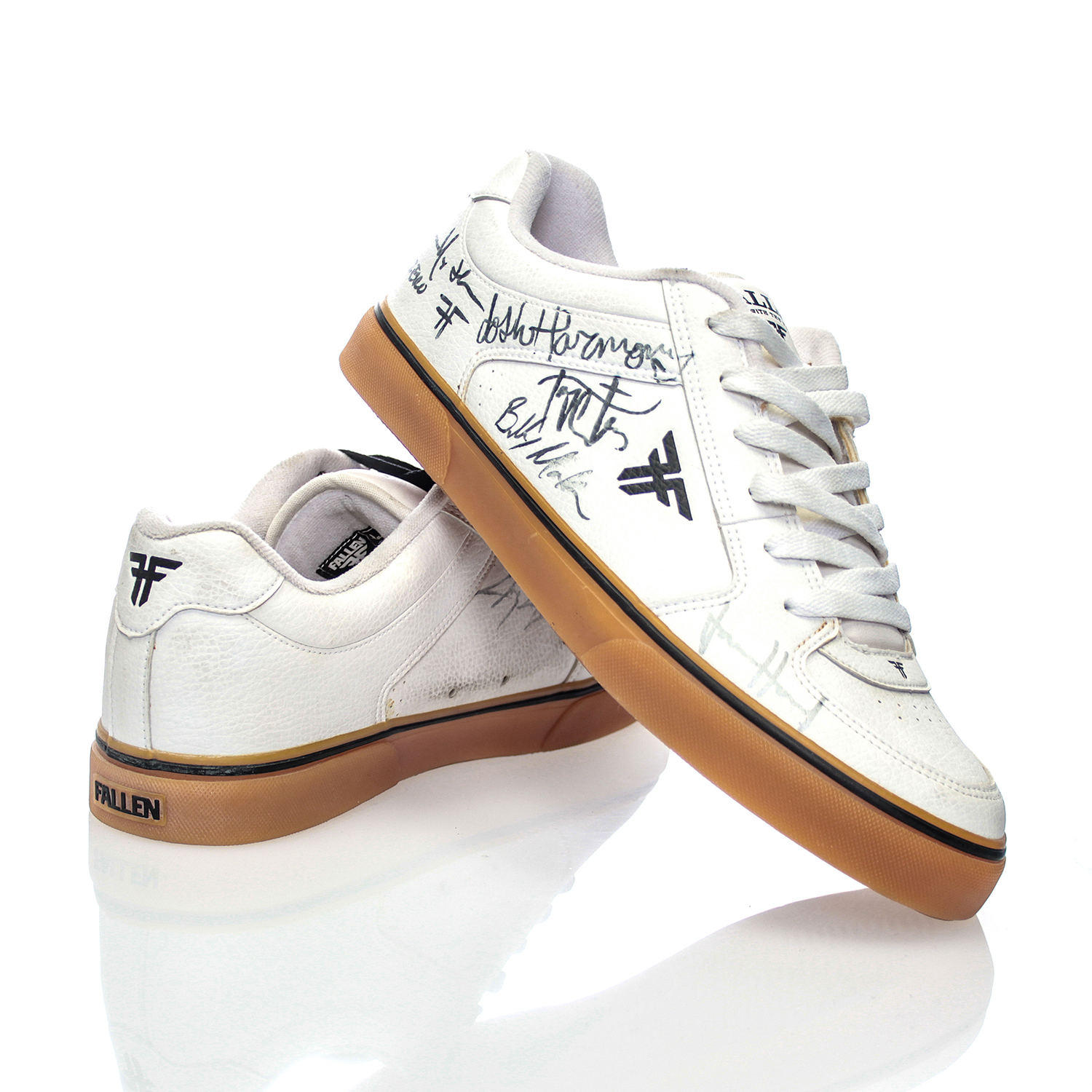
A pair of signed Fallen skate shoes

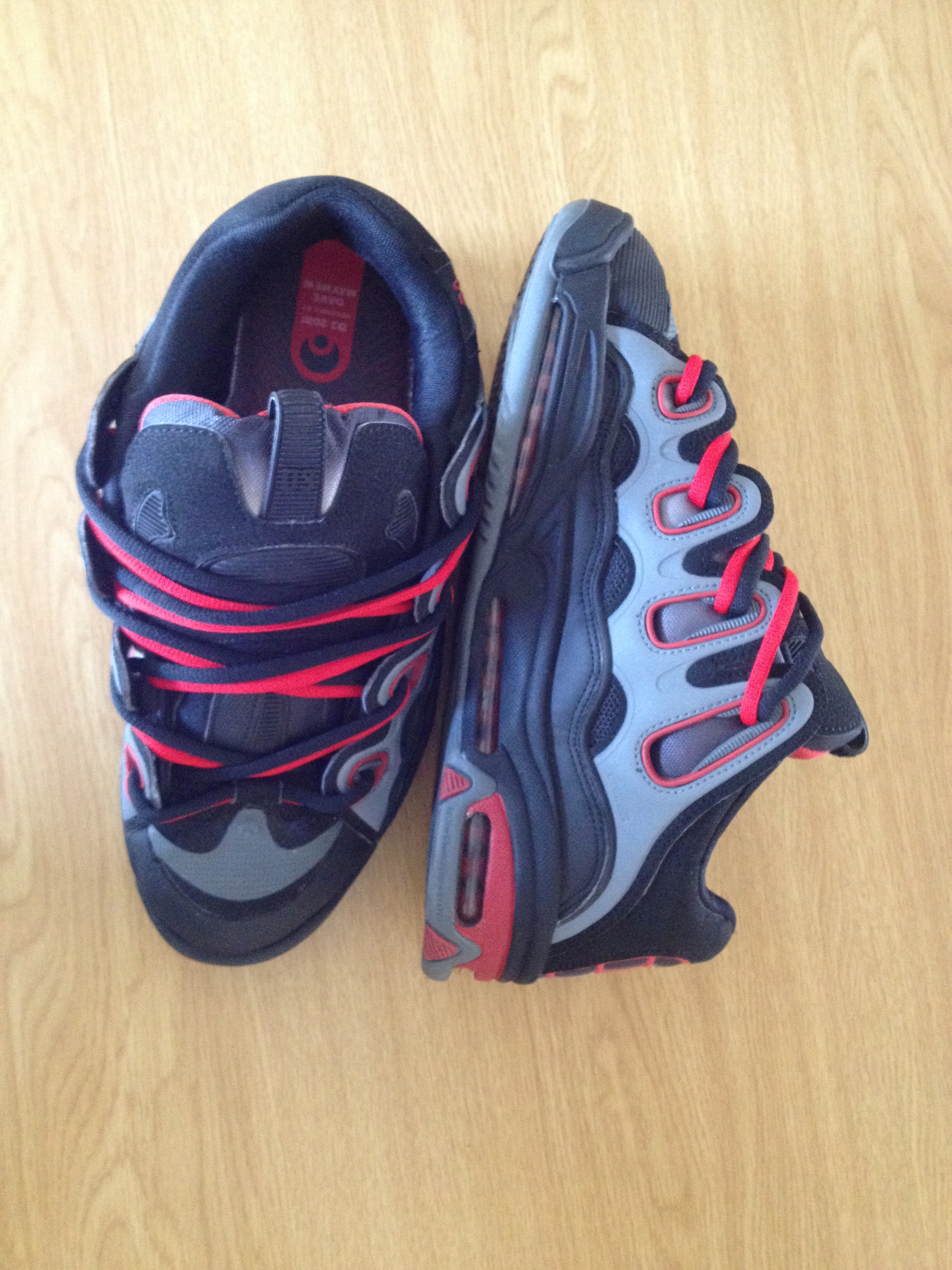
A pair of Osiris D3 2001 shoes

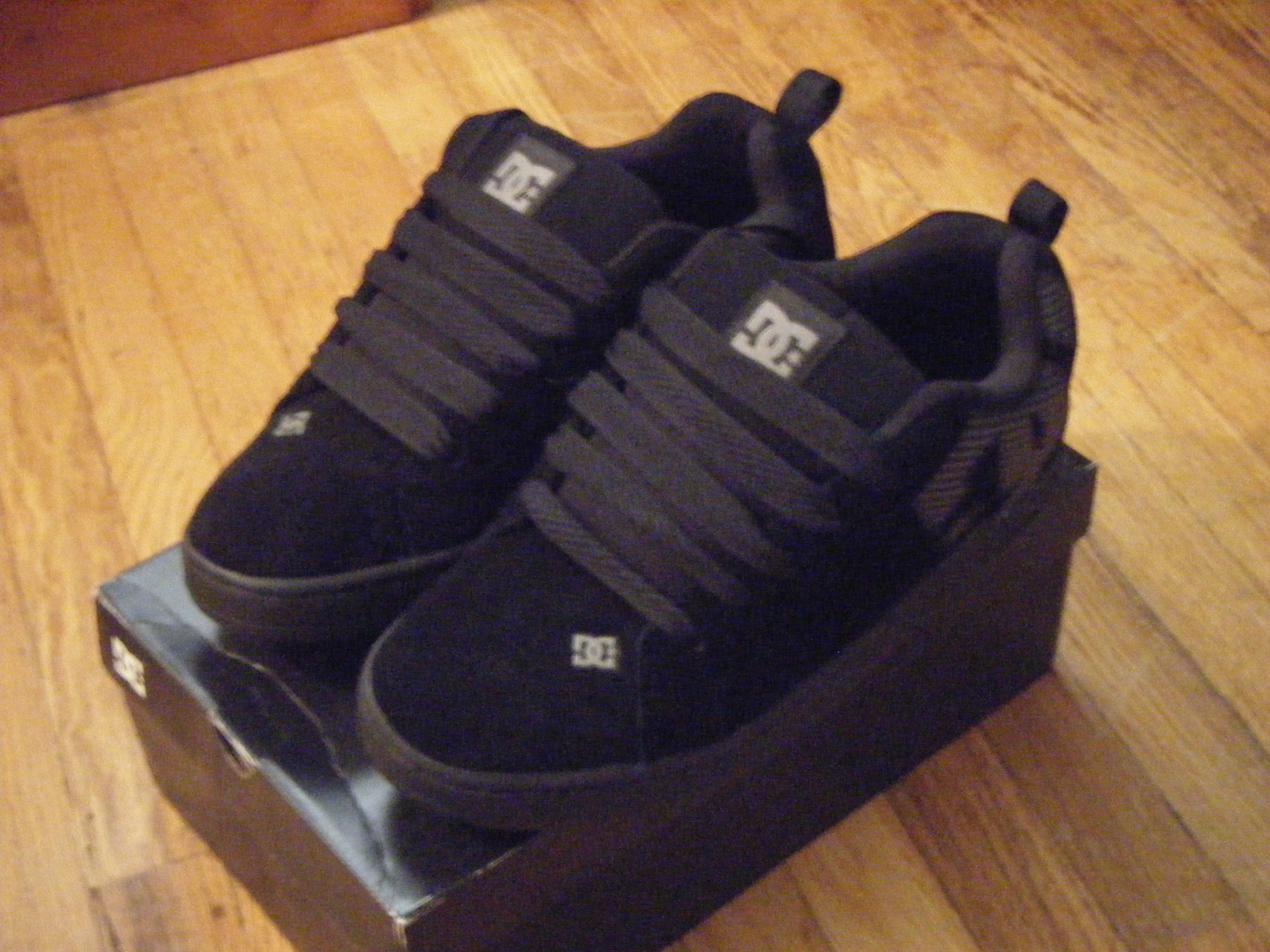
A pair of DC Court Graffik shoes

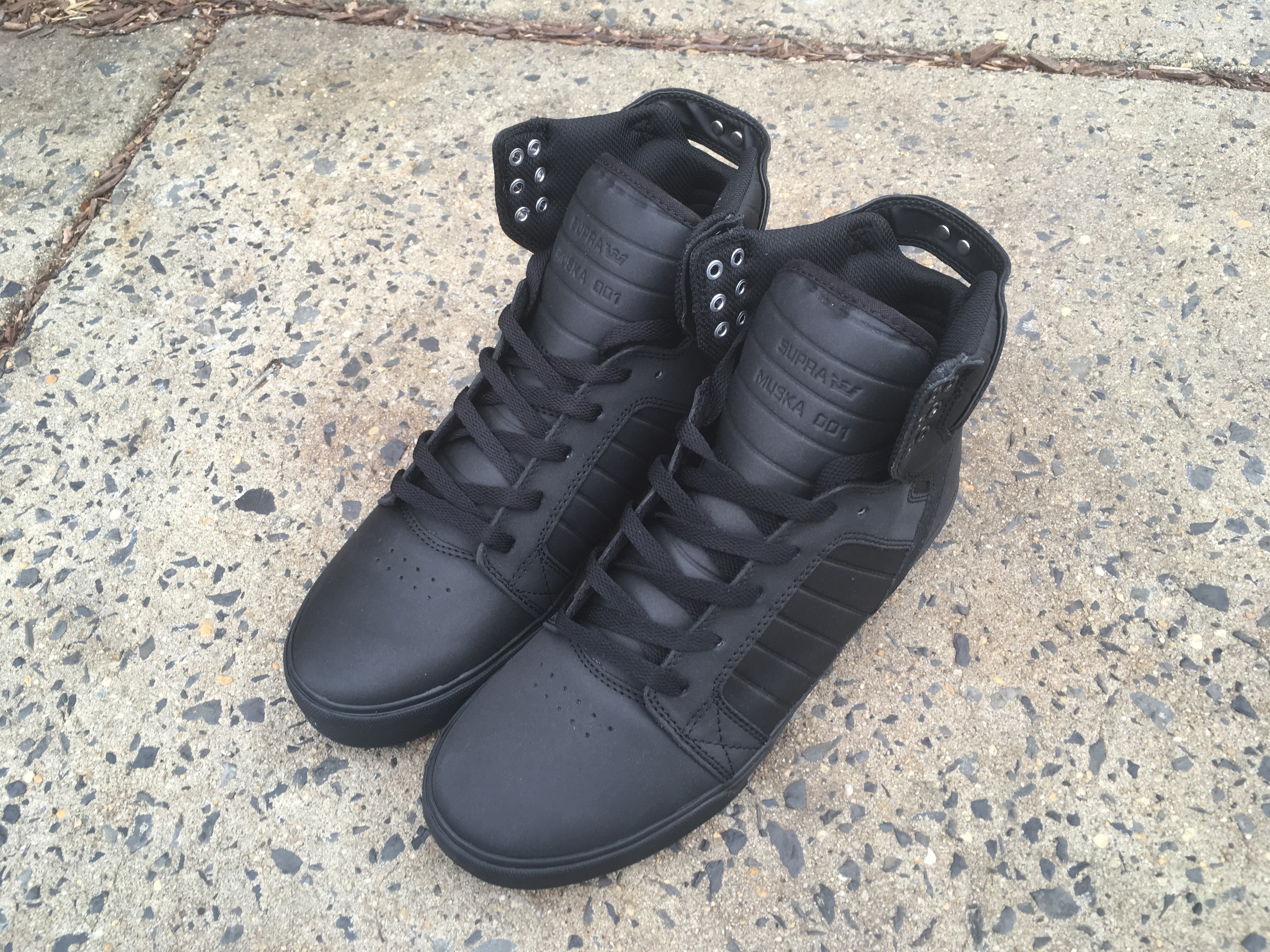
Supra Skytop Red Carpet shoes

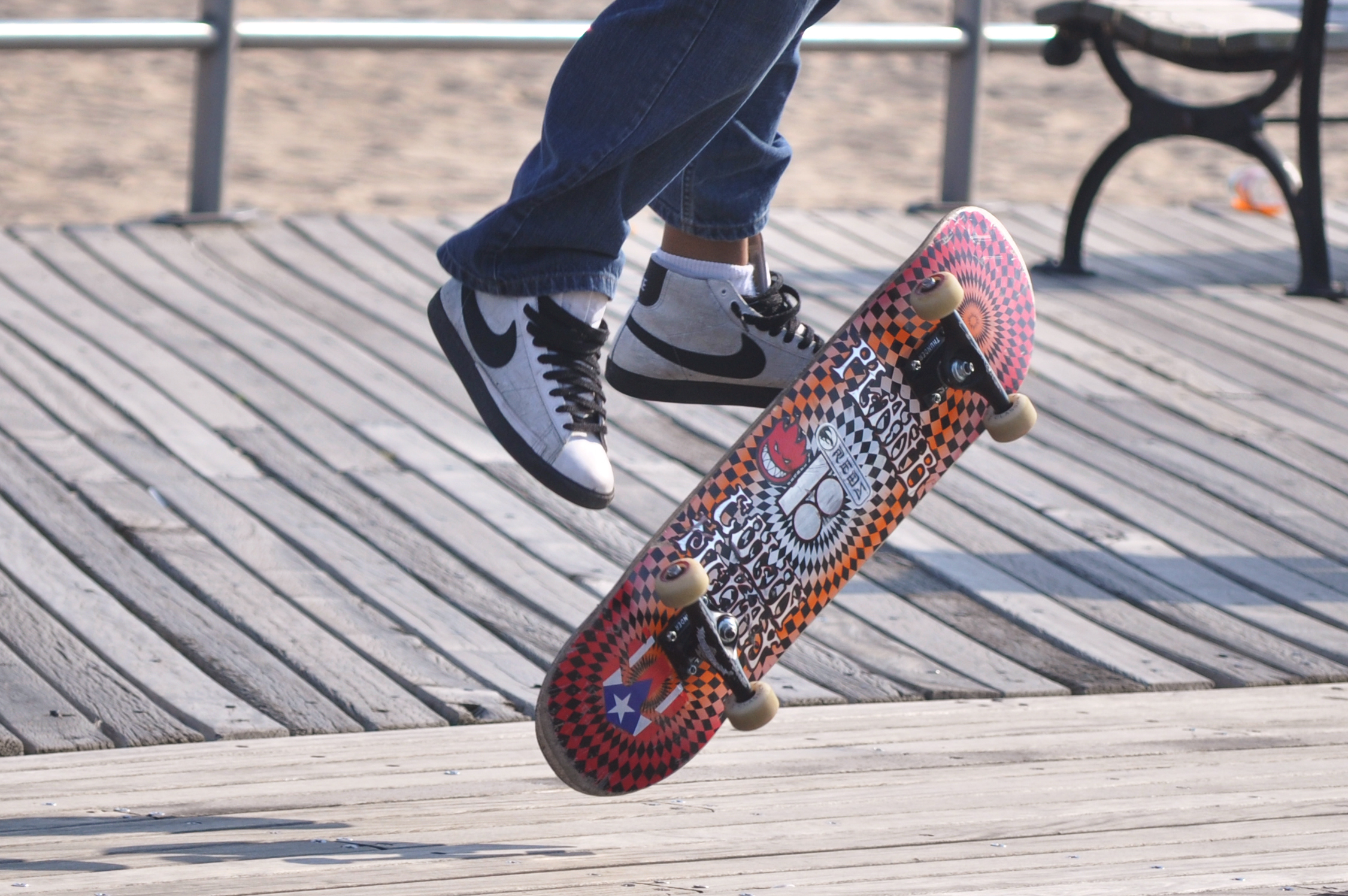
A pair of Nike SB Blazer skate shoes

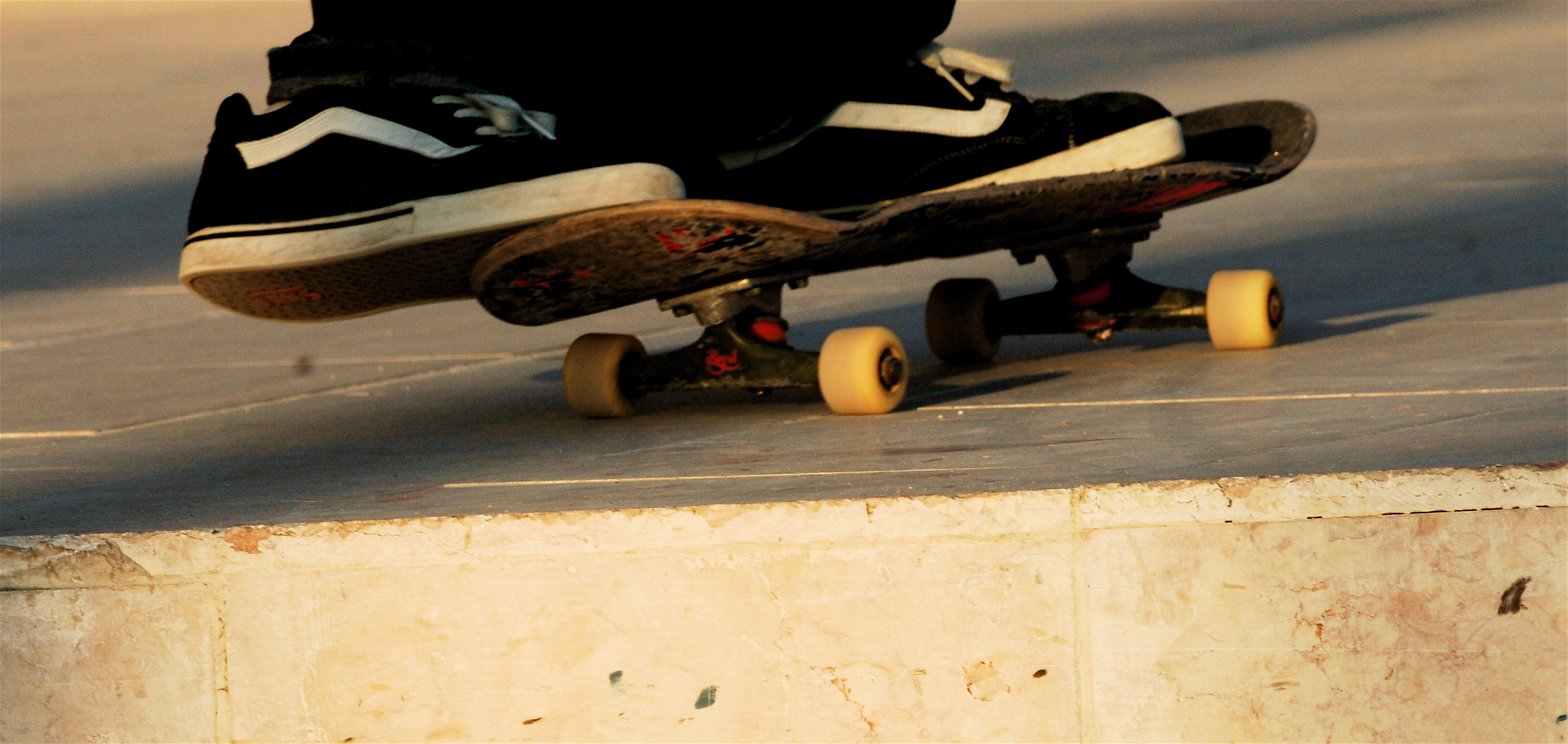
A pair of Vans skate shoes

Prominent professional skateboarders design and endorse professional skateboard shoes, often with their name or logo.

Some of the pro skateboard shoe designers include Eric Koston, Daewon Song, Kareem Campbell, Chad Muska, Andrew Reynolds, Marc Johnson, Geoff Rowley, and Anthony Van Engelen. Each of them has had several "pro model" designs mass-produced and sold as part of endorsement contracts with various professional skate shoe manufacturers.

=== Wax ===
Street skateboarders often travel with a block of wax, which is rubbed onto masonry to prepare it before a trick is attempted. The wax helps reduce the friction between the surfaces of the two materials when tricks which involve grinding or sliding are attempted.

=== Complete skateboards ===
Imperial measurement has become standardized for decks, trucks, nuts, and bolts, but wheel diameter is measured in millimeters.

Skateboard parts can be individually repaired or replaced should they require maintenance. Skateboards can be serviced using a standard Imperial socket set, an Allen key set, and a small Imperial spanner set. Some skate shops stock an all-in-one tool which has all of the required tools attached. Such tools are essential for travelling professional skateboarders and are useful to skaters who do not have easy access to all the required tools.

==== Specifications ====
The most common specifications of a modern professional-grade skateboard suitable for street practice and competition are as follows:

- A single set of 4 wheels, 52mm wide and 99A in durometer
- A pair of low in height 7.6" wide trucks
- An 8" wide, professional-grade, 7-ply Canadian maple deck
- 8 bearings
- 8 nuts and bolts
- A sheet of grip tape

There is no specific standard which should be followed when constructing a skateboard from parts. The consensus is that the board should just "feel right" after a few rides. Pre-built boards are available to buy at skate shops and often provide excellent value for riders new to skateboarding.

==== Components ====
The technical specifications of specific components vary from rider to rider and depend upon the following factors:

- Rider height
- Rider weight
- Shoe size
- Skill level
- Comfort
- Budget
- Preferred terrain, obstacles, and style of skating

Riders new to street skateboarding benefit greatly by seeking out advice regarding equipment from local skate parks and shops.

===== Grip =====
Grip tape, cut to length from a roll at retail, is traditionally a black rubber sheet with an abrasive surface on one side and an adhesive (like a sticker) on the other. Grip tape is installed by peeling the backing off the rubber strip and carefully placing the entire sheet onto the top of a skateboard deck. The operation requires skill and can be tricky to perform, as it can be difficult to prevent air bubbles. Once the sheet is in position, the edges of the sheet are filed away using a hand file until the rubber is exposed so that the sheet can be cut to fit using a sharp blade to remove the excess. Once applied, grip tape is extremely difficult to remove.

Grip tape comes in various colors and can also be adorned with a decal. Often a place of customization by the rider, a skateboarder may choose to cut out sections or shapes to decorate the top of the skateboard or simply to enable them to distinguish the nose and tail ends of their skateboard while they ride.

===== Decks =====
Board shapes have changed considerably since the 1970s, but modern pro models have remained similar in shape since the invention of the deep concave double kicktail deck. The contemporary shape of the skateboard is derived from the freestyle boards of the 1980s; these boards have a largely symmetrical shape and are relatively narrow.

Decks can be as narrow as 7.5" or as wide as 8.75". Length ranges from 760 to 830 millimetres (30 to 33 in).

Mass-produced, professional-grade skateboard decks are traditionally glued, multi-laminated, resin-covered, seven-ply pressed maple sandwiches cut and sanded to shape. The maple material traditionally comes from Canada and is usually described as "Hard rock Canadian Maple."

Often, skateboards are covered in graphics and decals. Some such decks become highly sought-after collector's items, especially if the graphic is of cultural significance and/or was created by a prominent artist.

Stickers often come with brand new skateboard decks and can be optionally applied to the deck or elsewhere. Stickers are an important promotional tool in the skate industry and are often given out for free at competitions or events.

With the skateboard facing forward, a skateboarder who rides regular stance calls the kicktail of a skateboard closest to their back foot the "tail." The kicktail at the opposite end of the deck is called the "nose."

===== Trucks =====
Trucks are the axles of a skateboard. Each truck is bolted to the underside of the skateboard deck using a set of four nuts and bolts. Rubber wheels containing bearings are positioned at each end of a truck component's axle and are secured using large threaded nuts at each end of the threaded axle rod. The maneuverability of the axle can be adjusted by increasing or decreasing tension via a large central nut and bolt called the "kingpin." Adjusting the kingpin has the effect of either increasing or decreasing the turning circle of the skateboard. On the kingpin are positioned two rubber bushings used for compact movement and shock absorption, by sandwiching one above the axle and the other above the base plate. The two bushings are clamped to the kingpin with two flat, round washers to hold them in position.

Professional-grade trucks are commonly constructed using forged aluminum or magnesium around an iron or steel axle rod. Trucks come in various widths and heights to match deck width and riding style. Rider preference for truck height selection is commonly low for street, mid for mixed park/street, and high for vert. Truck widths do not commonly exceed deck width, so as to avoid injury from protruding axle rods while the skateboard is spinning during tricks.

===== Wheels =====
Skateboard wheels come in diameters between 48 mm and 62 mm and are made of polyurethane, with a hardness (durometer) above 80A. Some wheels will be made harder than measurable on the "A" scale and will have durometers up to 84B (about 104A). Skaters must make a compromise when choosing their wheels. A larger diameter offers lower rolling resistance and more speed, but a smaller diameter makes some flip tricks easier to attempt. A softer durometer allows wheels to travel over cracks, bumps, and rough pavements more easily, whereas a harder durometer offers less resistance during power slides, grinds, and other rail and ledge tricks.

In the early 1990s, as many flip tricks were being performed for the first time, smaller, harder wheels were preferred because they offered a slight competitive edge for highly technical tricks. Skateboarders would often ride 48 mm or sometimes even smaller wheels during this time. As skaters started performing tricks on larger obstacles, speed became a more important factor, and as a result, many began gravitating toward larger wheels. Today, 52 mm wheels are considered the standard size, although some skaters choose smaller or larger wheels based on their style and preferred terrain.

===== Bearings =====
Skate bearings come in one size. They are push-fit and can be serviced and installed in rubber skateboard wheels by hand or by using a tool. Usually consisting of a steel casing and steel or ceramic ball bearings, skate bearings are rated by ABEC, may come with a waterproof race guard, and are normally lubricated with grease.

== Competitions ==
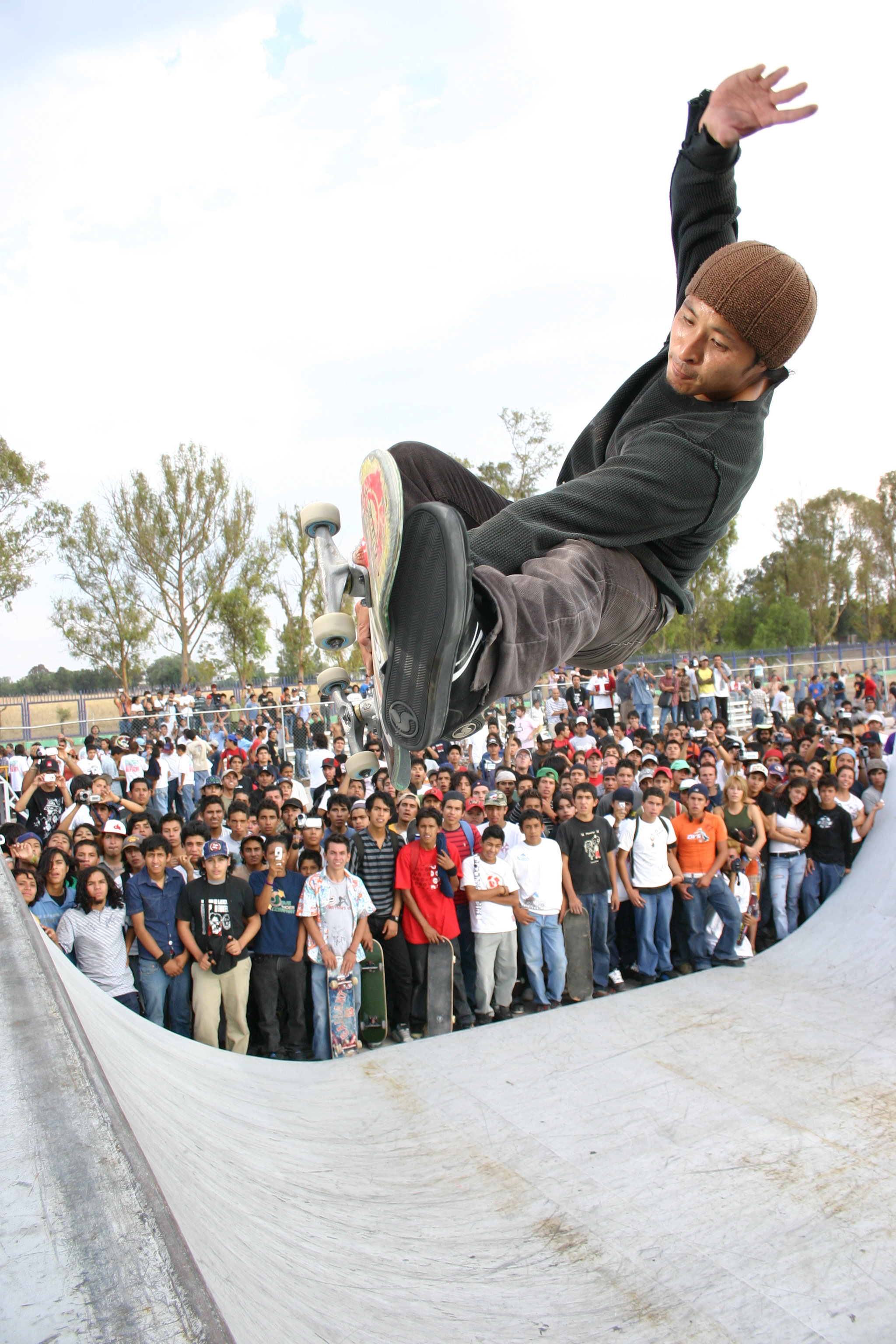
Daewon Song skating a miniramp in Guanajuato, Mexico

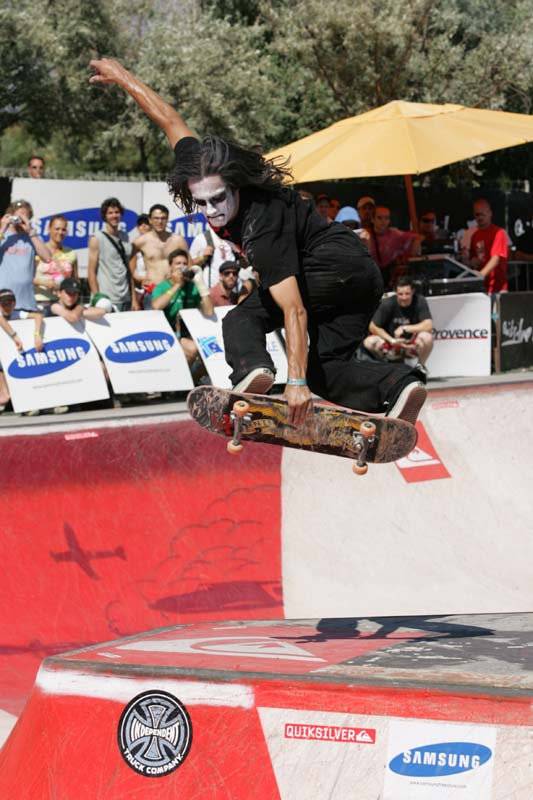
Tony Trujillo at the 2005 Quicksilver Bowlriders in Marseille, France

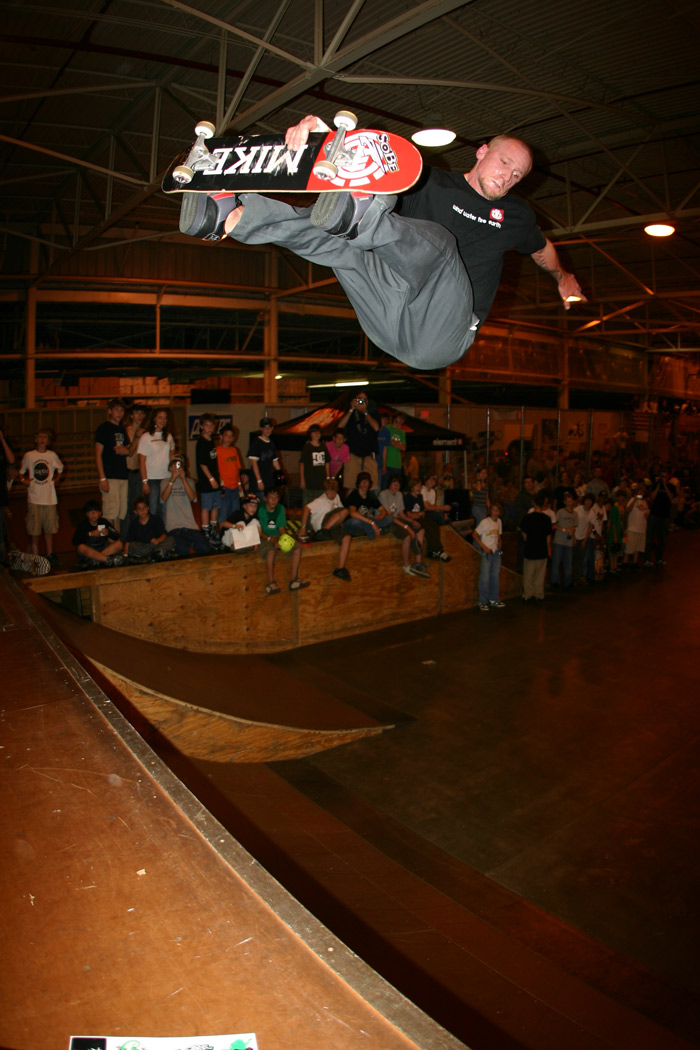
Mike Vallely performing a head-high frontside air at a demo at Doc*36 Skatepark in Jackson, Mississippi

=== Skateparks ===
Competition-level street skateboarding events are held within purpose-built skatepark arenas or cordoned-off urban areas. Within a street skateboarding competition obstacle course, concrete, plastic, metal, or wooden reproductions of obstacles naturally found within the urban environment are placed as they would be in a real urban environment. A course is usually complemented by adding transitions which permit greater travelling speed and an increased amount of "air." Other forms of ramp such as funboxes, which are designed with optimal space use in mind, are commonly found within a park's layout. The course for the first auditorium-size street skating po contest, the 1987 Savannah Slamma! held in Savannah, Georgia at the Martin Luther King Jr. Arena, was designed by Lance Mountain and constructed by renowned ramp-builder Tommy "TK" Kay.

A popular street skateboarding spot, the West Los Angeles Courthouse building, was converted into a skatepark after the courthouse shut down in 2012.

The world's first ever purpose-built street skateboarding plaza was The Buszy in Central Milton Keynes, England.

New York City is home to a number of skateparks.

The most famous indoor street style skate park in the world is The Berrics.

==== Examples of skateparks ====
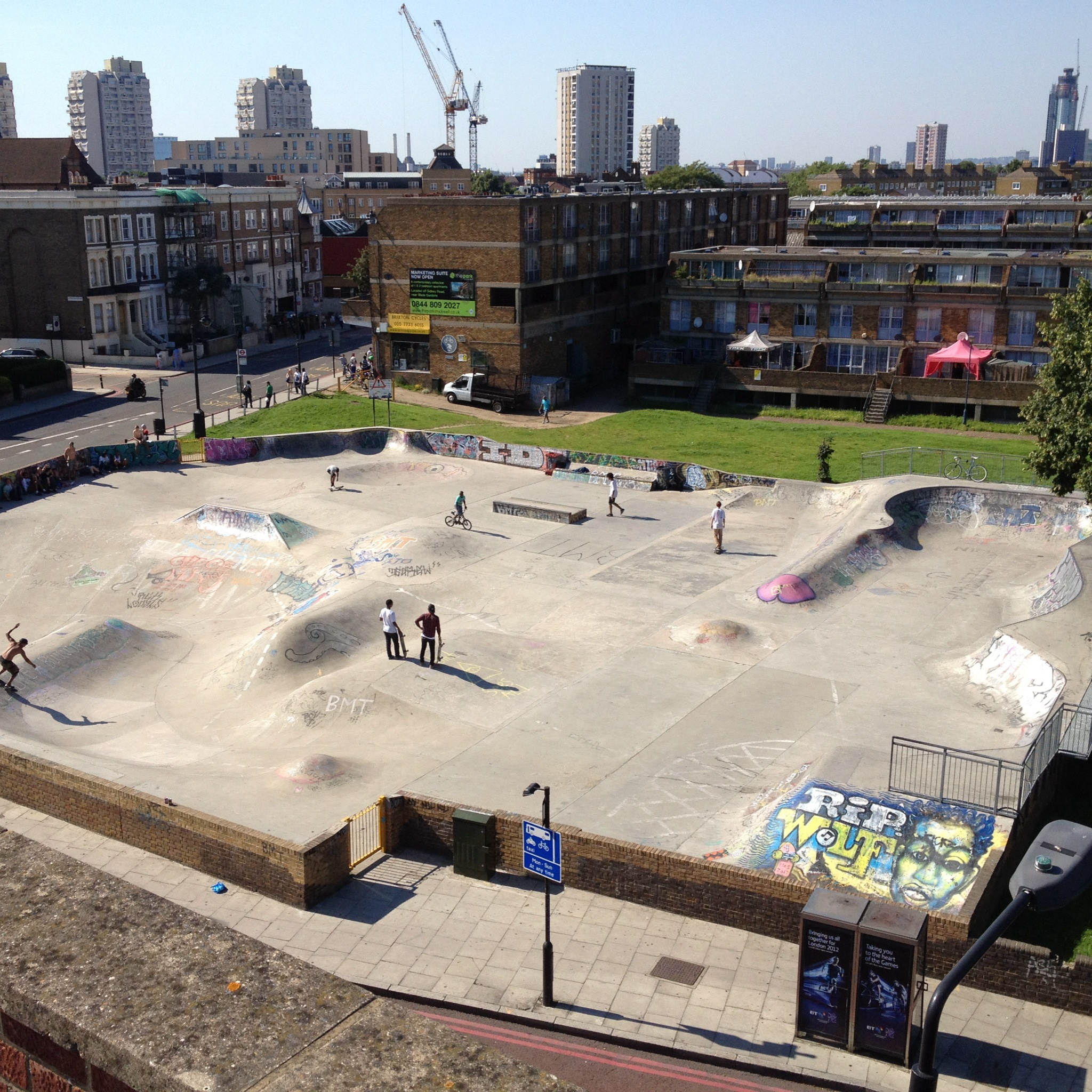
Stockwell Skatepark in the borough of Lambeth in South London

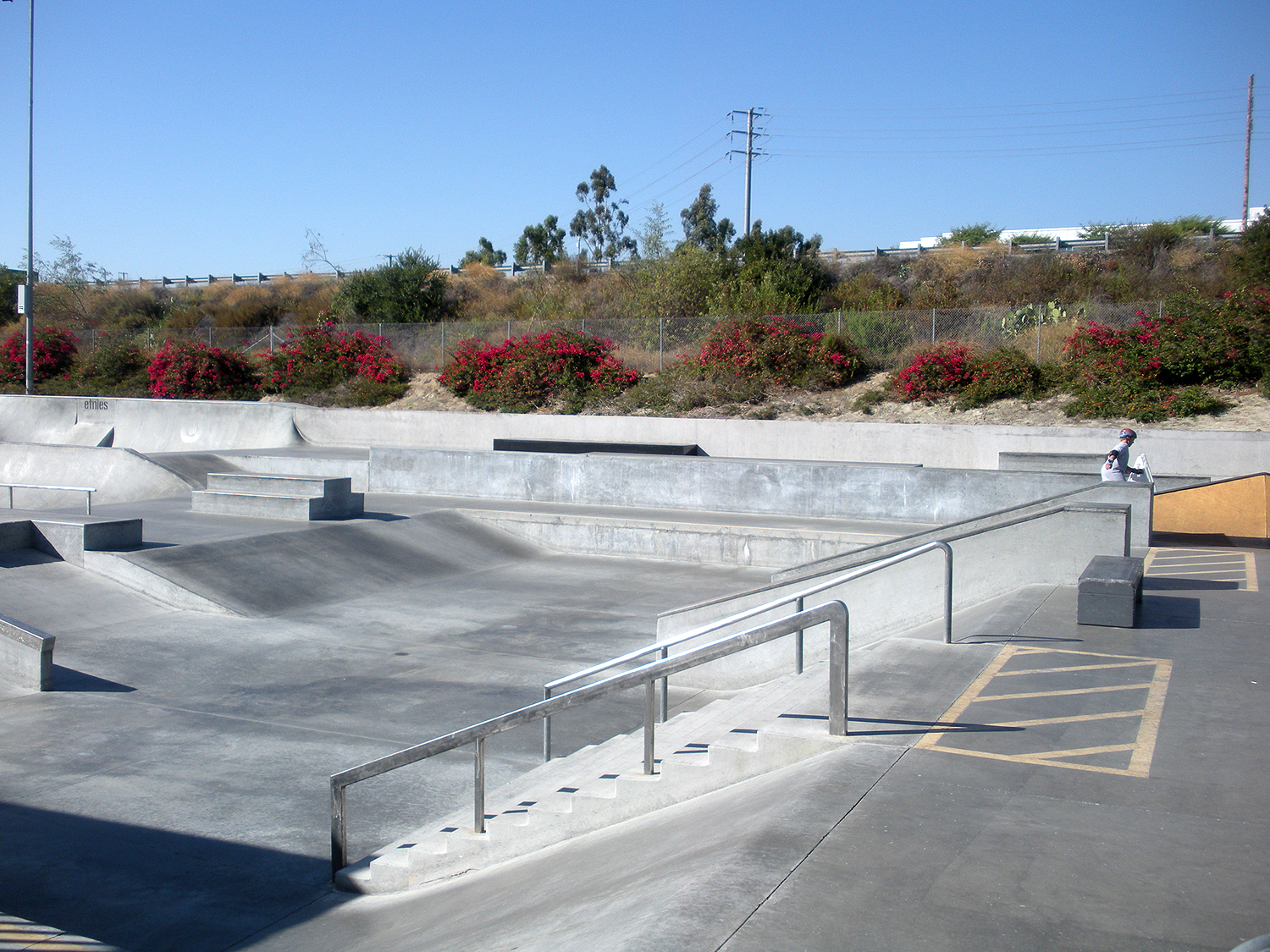
Etnies Skatepark in Lake Forest, California

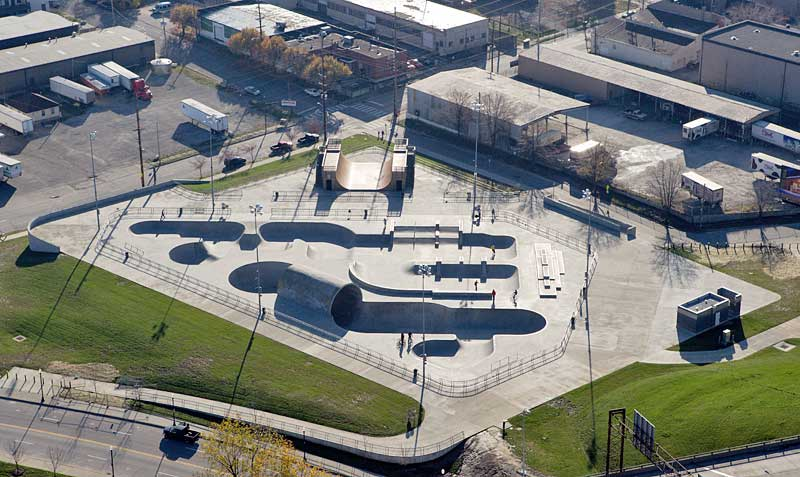
David Armstrong Extreme Park near downtown Louisville, Kentucky

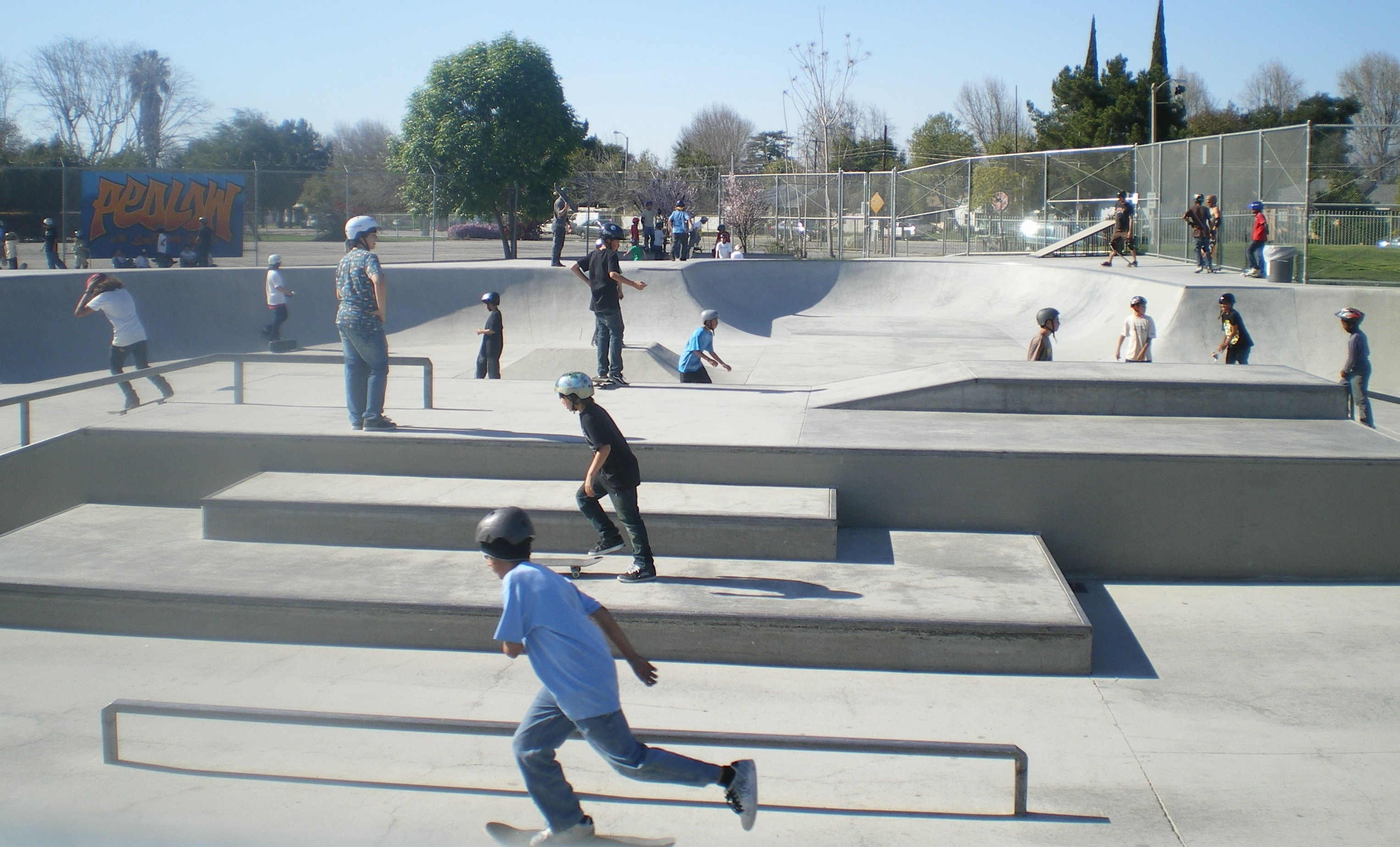
Pedlow Skate Park in the Encino neighborhood of Los Angeles

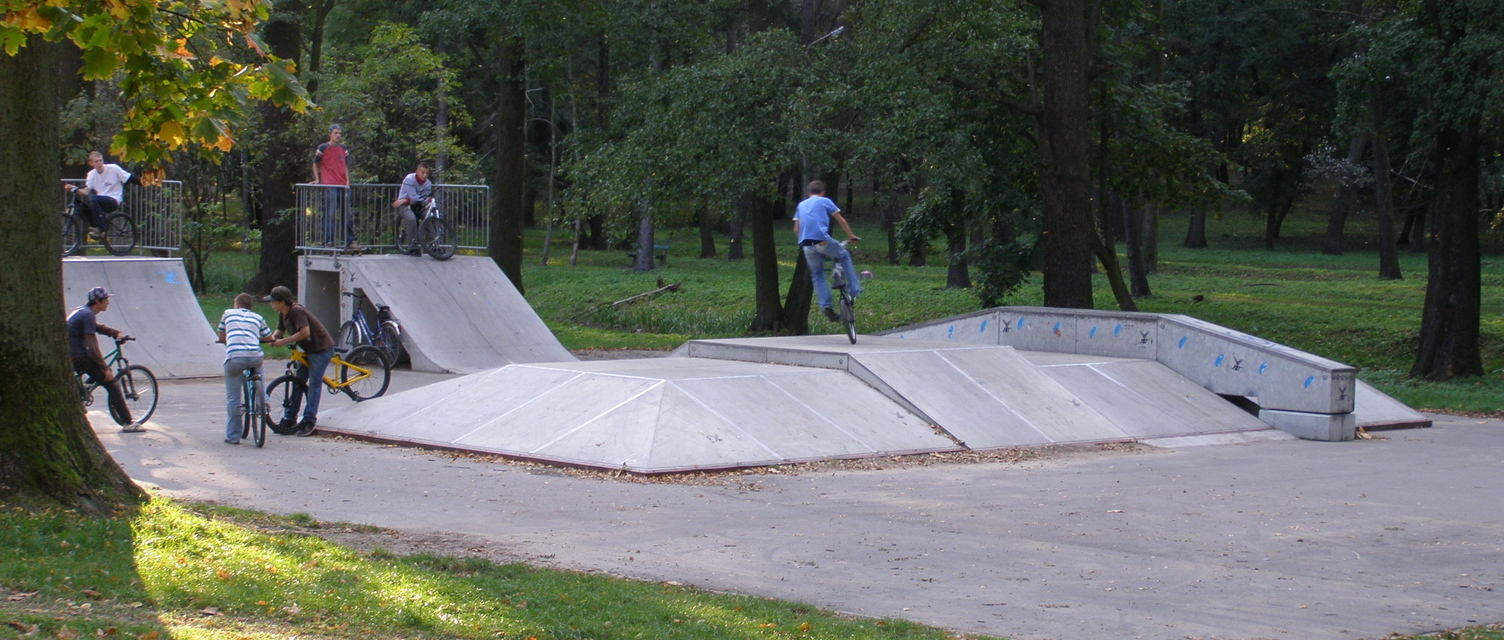
A park in Mińsk Mazowiecki

Alamosa Skatepark in Albuquerque, New Mexico

The Flow Skatepark in Columbus, Ohio

Modern street skateboarding competitions employ a format wherein each participant has two timed attempts or "runs" to attack the course and "shred" (perform a series of tricks as cleanly as possible). The entrants' attempts are then scored by a panel of judges to decide an overall winner. Competition entrants who perform exceptionally well are traditionally vocally congratulated and encouraged by the crowd during and at the end of their run. Spectating skateboarders commonly show their appreciation for well-performed tricks or smooth runs by slapping their skateboard on a hard surface or obstacle in a complimentary, often respectful but audibly enthusiastic way.

=== Notable competitions ===
A number of major international competitions include a street skateboarding event or component. Some examples include:

- Street League Skateboarding
- World Cup of Skateboarding
- Maloof Money Cup
- Gravity Games
- The X Games
- Tampa Pro
- Battle at the Berrics
- The 2018 Asian Games
- The 2020 Summer Olympic Games (For the first time)

==== Olympic Skateboarding ====
In March 2019, The United States announced members of their 2019 USA Skateboarding National Team.

The plan to run a skateboarding event at the 2020 Summer Olympics in Japan caused controversy within the skateboarding community.

In May 2019, the scheduled skateboarding event was removed from the Lima 2019 Pan American Games. Panam Sports announced that skateboarding was removed from the sports program because World Skate could not guarantee that the best athletes would be in attendance. World Skate had scheduled a world tour event which overlapped with the Pan American Games and would also not authorize the competition as an Olympic qualifier.

A skateboarding event has been provisionally approved by the IOC for inclusion at the 2024 Olympic Games in Paris. Skateboarding events will also feature at the 2022 Asian Games in Hangzhou.

==== Game of Skate ====
The Game of Skate is a form of competition which requires no street obstacles and simply a perfectly smooth and sufficiently large skating surface for skateboarders to use to take it in turns to attempt to land flat land tricks.

== Public perception ==
In some cases, local authorities have introduced initiatives which ban skateboarding, confiscate skateboards, or make skateboarding difficult or impossible via hostile architecture or by adding skatestoppers to the environment. These deterrents are commonly targeted at BMX riders, rollerbladers, and scooter riders also—not only skateboarders.

=== Examples of skate deterrents ===
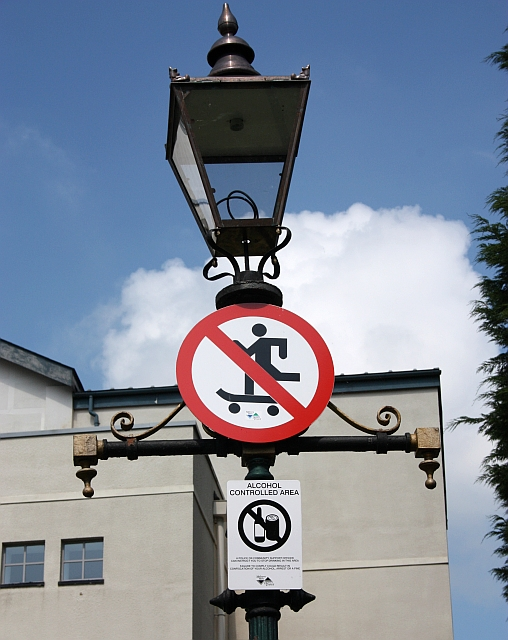
A sign prohibiting skateboarding

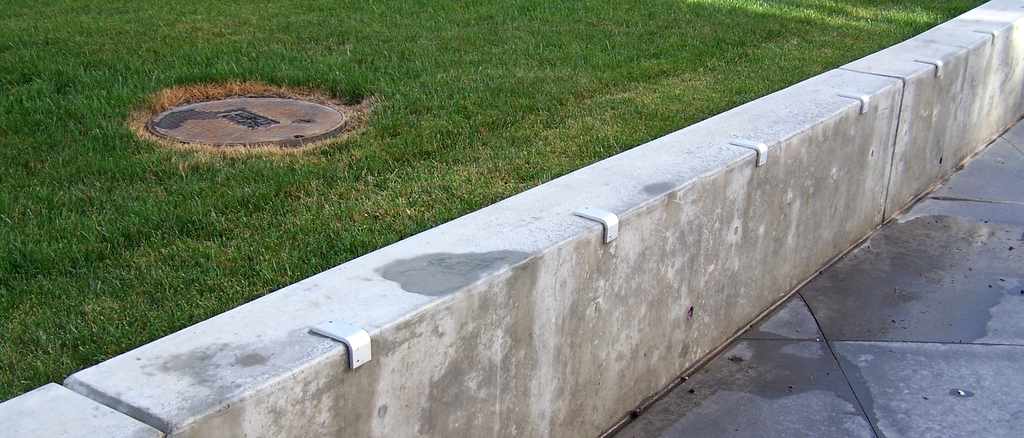
A ledge peppered with skatestoppers

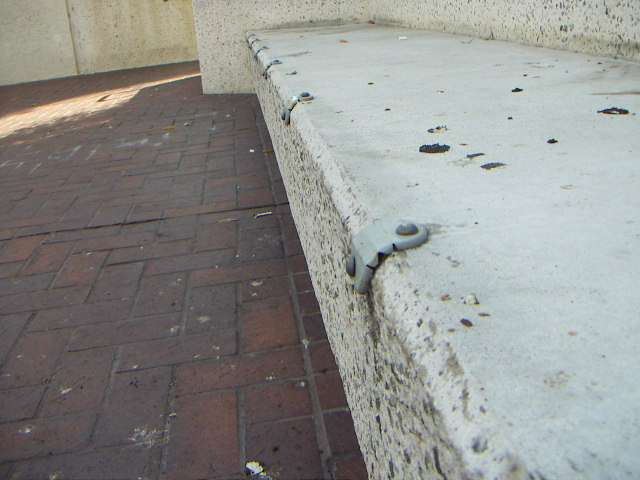
Small sized skatestoppers

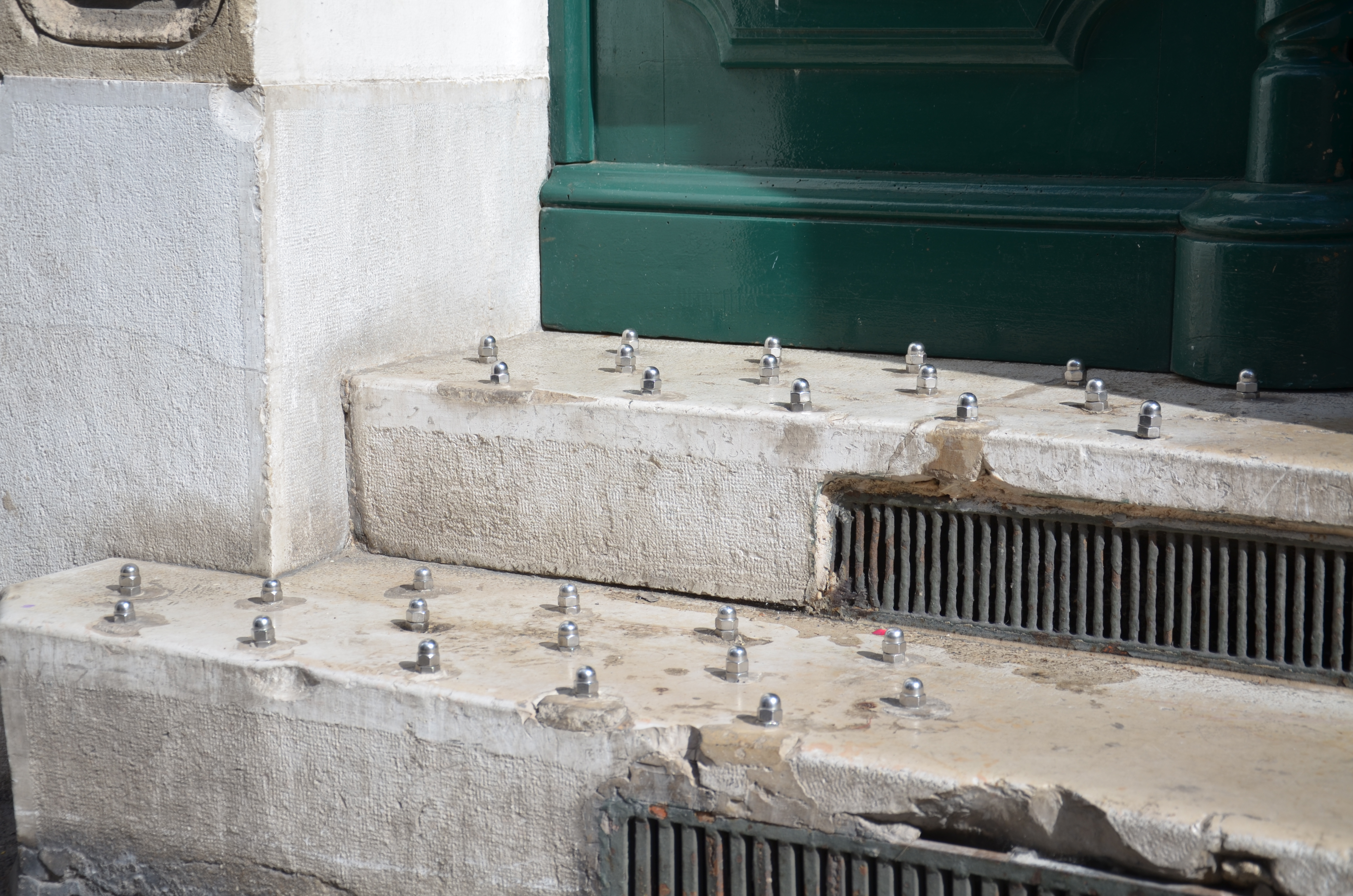
Bolts are deployed in some areas

Local authorities often consider street skateboarding in public places a public nuisance. A local council or other authority meeting may be called. Such meetings allow skateboarders to make their voices heard in the event of a proposal to introduce anti-skateboarding legislation. The outcome of this type of meeting is often the formation of some sort of local skateboarding group or organization, along with a drive to fund and build a skate park.

=== Success stories ===
In 2002, Philadelphia city officials decided to deconstruct LOVE Park to deter skateboarders from using what officials considered "an area meant for productive citizens that gave back to the community." Years later, skateboarders such as Josh Nims and others built a spiritual replacement for LOVE Park named Paine's Park. Located near the center of the city, Paine's Park attempts to recreate some of the unique obstacles and features of LOVE Park within a specially designated skateboarding environment. The undertaking involved substantial effort by a large number of people.
