= Skyhook =

Skyhook, sky hook or skyhooks may refer to:

== Fiction ==
- Sky Hook, a Hugo Award–nominated science fiction fanzine
- Sky Hook (film), a 1999 Yugoslavian film
- 'Skyhooks' and 'Skyhooks II', parts 1 and 8, respectively, of the Adventure Time Elements miniseries
- 'Sky hook', a "non-existent" item commonly requested in a construction industry fool's errand
- Sky-Hook, the player's melee weapon in the 2013 video game BioShock Infinite

== Music ==
- "Skyhook", a song by Dance Gavin Dance from their 2008 album Dance Gavin Dance
- Skyhooks (band), an Australian rock band

== Science ==
- Skyhook (concept), an explanation of design complexity that does not build on lower, simpler layers

== Sports ==
- Skyhook (boarding), a binding used in skateboarding and related sports
- Skyhook (climbing), a hook used in technical climbing
- Skyhook (skydiving), a device for quickly extracting reserve parachutes
- Skyhook (tennis), a version of the overhead smash
- Hook shot, variant, the signature shot of Basketball Hall of Famer Kareem Abdul-Jabbar

== Technology ==
- Skyhook (cable), a hypothetical device used to lift an object on a long cable hanging from the sky
- Skyhook (skydiving), a type of main-assisted reserve parachute deployment system
- Skyhook (structure), a space elevator concept
- Skyhook balloon, a type of unmanned balloon used by the United States Navy in the late 1940s and in the 1950s for atmospheric research
- SkyHook JHL-40, an experimental combination airship/helicopter in development by Boeing
- Skyhook theory, a theory used in some automobile suspensions
- Skyhook Wireless, a technology company that invented hybrid location positioning
- Airco DH.6, nicknamed Skyhook, an early (1916) ab initio trainer aircraft
- Australian Autogyro Skyhook, also known as the Minty Skyhook Mini Chopper
- Cessna CH-1 Skyhook, a helicopter produced in the early 1960s
- Fulton surface-to-air recovery system, nicknamed Skyhook, a retrieval method by which a flying aircraft picks up a payload
- a system used to launch and recover parasite planes from airships; see Curtiss F9C Sparrowhawk
