= Pedlow =

Pedlow is a surname. Notable people with the surname include:

- Cecil Pedlow (1934–2019), Irish rugby union player
- Isaac Ellis Pedlow (1861–1954), Canadian politician

== See also ==
- Pedlow Skate Park, skate park in Los Angeles
