= Backside =

Backside may refer to:

- Frontside and backside, terms in action sports for whether the athlete faces toward or away from an obstacle
- Backside, a term for the buttocks
- Backside, a term in horse racing for the area behind a racetrack

== See also ==
- Back Sides, a 2006 album by Lazlo Bane
