= Larry Stevenson =

- Born: Richard Lawrence Stevenson; December 22, 1930; Los Angeles, California, U.S.
- Died: 25 March 2012 (aged 81); Santa Monica, California, U.S.
- Education: Santa Monica College
- Occupation: Inventor
- Known for: Skateboard kicktail

Richard Lawrence "Larry" Stevenson (December 22, 1930 – March 25, 2012) was an American Skateboarder. He was the inventor of the kicktail, the bent-upwards end of a skateboard, which made most of today's skateboarding tricks possible and essentially revolutionized the sport.

== Early life ==
Stevenson was born in 1930 in Los Angeles, California; his mother was Inez Kiem and his father was Leonard Stevenson. After high school Larry Stevenson joined the U.S. Navy as a fighter mechanic. He served for two years in the Korean War.

After that, he went on to Santa Monica College in California and became a swimmer. He played water polo and swam for Coach John Josephs. Stevenson won the all American award for fastest time for the breast stroke. The record was only recently broken, and he was given a lifetime allowance into any Santa Monica College event, if he wished to attend. After SMC, Stevenson went to USC, on a swimming scholarship, where he majored in business.

During the middle to late part of the 1950s, Stevenson became a Venice Beach lifeguard for the city of Los Angeles. While sitting watching surfers he noticed they would skate on crude skateboards back in the parking lots at the beach. This was true especially when there was no surf. Stevenson, while visiting Hawaii en route to Korea, during the war noticed a great surfing beach called "Makaha". All those years later he remembered how much he liked the beach in Hawaii, but he also loved the name Makaha.

After a short period of time, Stevenson started MAKAHA skateboards. He is credited with being the man who made the first high-quality skateboard. He patented the double kicktail in 1969, had the first skate team in 1963, and held the first skateboard contest in 1963. Stevenson also published Surfguide magazine during the 1960s, and Poweredge skateboarding magazine during the 1980s and 1990s. He was involved with Makaha and Poweredge; both have been reborn with new editors.

He was inducted into the Skateboarding Hall of Fame in 2010.

== Death ==
Stevenson died on March 25, 2012, from complications of pneumonia due to Parkinson's disease in his Santa Monica home. He died in the age of 81.
