= Skyhook (boarding) =

In skateboarding and related sports, skyhooks are devices which serve as semi-open bindings. They are usually made of aluminium, steel or hard plastic and are formed to cover the rider's boot, yet to allow him to easily free his feet from the hook. They may be screwed to the top of the board to facilitate jumping and enhance stability during a ride.

They are mostly used on freeboards and longboards without a kicktail.
