= List of skateboarding terms =

This is a skateboarding related list that defines everything, maneuver, venue, and physics terms that are important to skateboarding. These terms are commonly used in the vocabulary of a skateboarder in order to reference specific parts, tricks, and locations efficiently.

== Anatomy of a skateboard ==
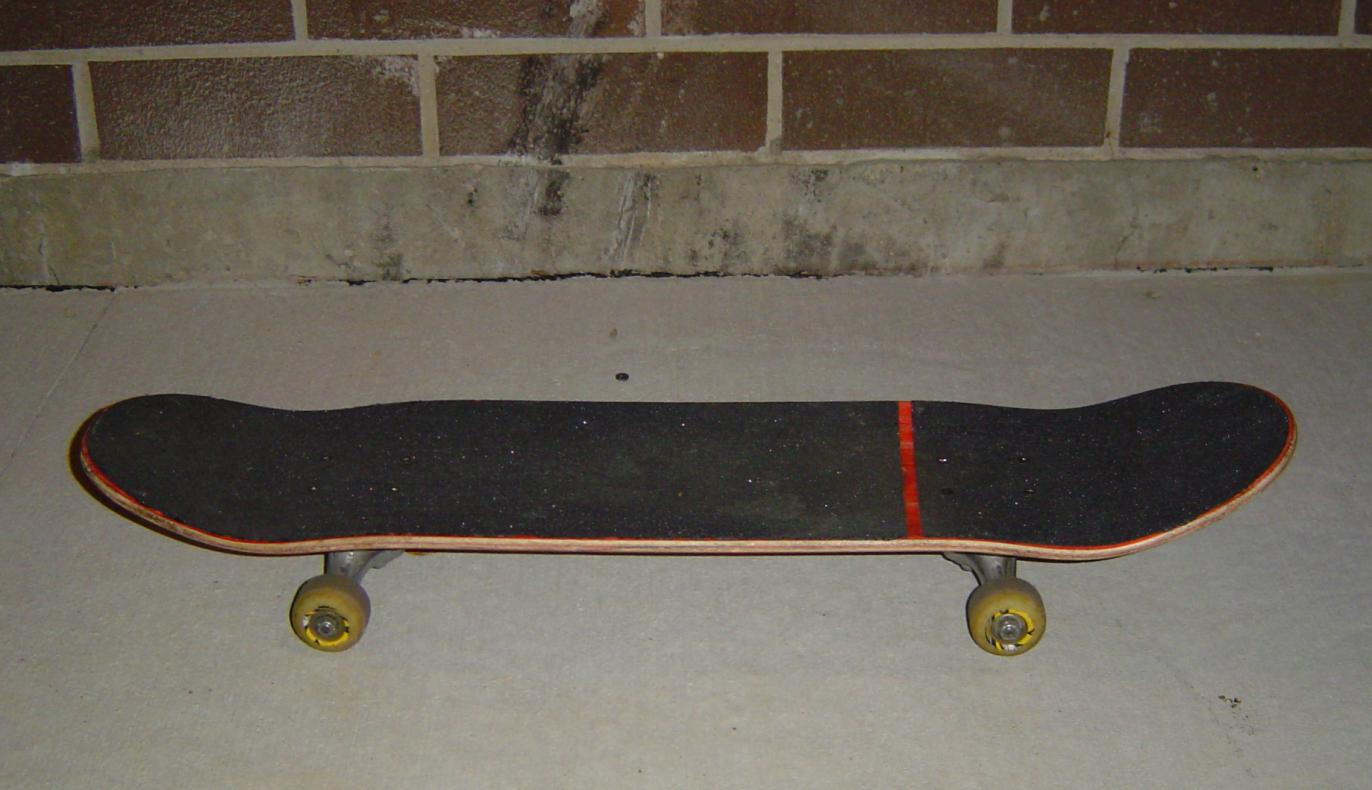
A typical skateboard

A skateboard is made up of many parts both movable and immovable that when put together allow a rider to propel themself forward and steer left or right. A skateboard is propelled by pushing with one foot while the other remains on the board, or by pumping in structures such as a pool or half-pipe. A skateboard can also be used by simply standing on the board while on a downward slope and allowing gravity to propel the board and rider.

=== Board parts ===
- Hardware: Nuts, bolts, and screws that hold the trucks, bushings, and base plate onto the board.
- Board: Also known as the Deck or Shape, this is the main part of a skateboard, the portion that is used to skate on. Boards are typically made of 7 or 9 plies of maple, birch, or some other wood, laminated together and shaped into numerous board shapes.
- Grip tape: Sandpaper affixed to the top of the board with adhesive. Grip tape provides traction so movement from the feet is transferred to the board.
- Nose: The front of the skateboard.
- Tail: The rear of the skateboard, usually measured from the rear truck bolts to the end of the board (usually curved up at about a 10-degree angle from the rest of the deck).

=== Truck parts ===
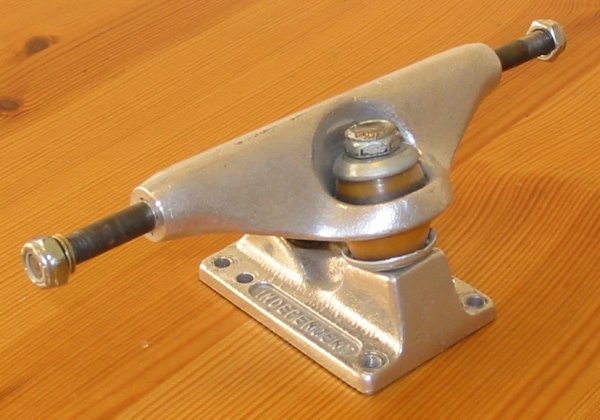
A skateboard truck

- Trucks: The truck is the collective name for the front and rear axle assemblies that connect the wheels to the deck and provide the turning capabilities for the board. The major components of the truck includes the base plate, axle, and the hanger. The truck bears the weight load of board.
- Axle: The axle is a metal rod which runs through the hanger and extends from it on either side. Wheels are inserted on either end and secured with the axle nut.
- Wheels: Usually made of polyurethane and sized between 39 and 70 millimeters in diameter, their hardness is measured by durometer, a number ranging from 0 to 100. Soft wheels have a durometer of about 85, hard wheels have a durometer of 98 or higher. .63 mm wheels are usually reserved for longboards, which go significantly faster and benefit from a softer wheel.
- Wheelbase: The distance between the front and back wheels, measured between the two sets of innermost truck bolt holes. A longer wheelbase adds stability by increasing its moments of inertia and reducing the pitch and/or yaw induced by wheel displacement.
- Kingpin: A partially threaded bolt placed through the base plate and truck and secured with the kingpin nut. The kingpin holds the bushings, truck hanger, and base plate together. Trucks with kingpins that face away from each other, with the kingpin nuts on the inside, are called "traditional kingpin". Longboards are often fitted with trucks that have the kingpins facing away from each other, with the kingpin nuts on the outside, closer to the nose and tail. This is called "reverse kingpin".
- Bushing: Bushings are donut-shaped polyurethane pieces that are inserted onto the kingpin of a truck. There are two bushings per truck, one above and one below where the hanger fits onto the kingpin. These are sometimes called the boardside and roadside bushing, respectively. Like wheels, bushings are available with different levels of hardness. The kingpin nut may be tightened or loosened to adjust the turning radius and response of the truck itself. Tighter bushings mean stiffer trucks and less chance of "wheel bite", where the wheel makes contact with the deck, damaging the deck and slowing or stopping the wheels. Loose bushings make for easier turning at the cost of more frequent wheel bite.
- Pivot cup: A raised and hollowed receptacle on the base plate opposite the kingpin which holds the pivot bushing.
- Pivot bushing: A plastic cup-shaped piece which rests in the pivot cup of the base plate and supports the truck's hanger at the pivot point allowing the truck to pivot smoothly. The pivot bushing prevents frictional contact between the truck and the base plate and provides a cushioned pivot point.

=== Bearings ===
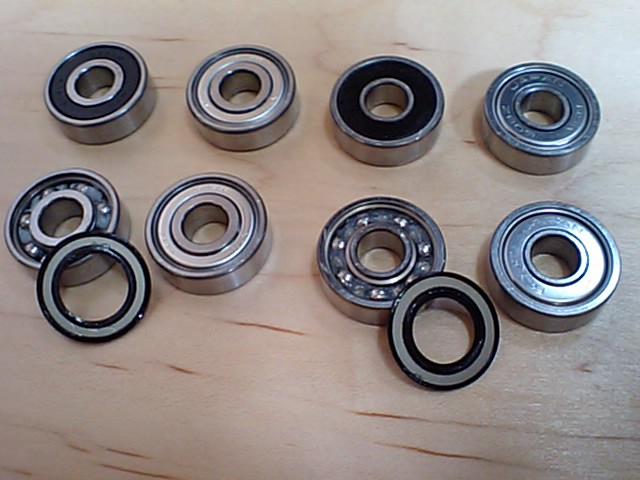
Eight bearings, two bearings for each of the four wheels.

Animation of a ball bearing. Red dots show direction of rotation. The two concentric circles that the ball bearings ride on are called races.

- Bearings: Bearings allow for the smooth turning of a wheel on its axle. Bearings consist of 6, 7, or 8 balls enclosed in races between two shields encased in a disc-like body. Bearings can be measured by an ABEC rating. Skateboard bearings typically come in sets of eight and are inserted into both sides of the wheel; two bearings for each of the four wheels.
- Crown: Crowns are also called retainers or cages and are usually made of Delrin. Crowns hold and separate the individual balls in a bearing.
- Bearing shield: The two walls that hold the ball bearings and Delrin crowns from falling out. The bearing shield plays an important role as well in keeping dirt from getting into the bearing and slowing it down. Some bearings have only one shield and can be taken apart for maintenance.
- C clip: The C clip is a mechanism for locking bearing shields in place. It is essentially a thin C-shaped wire that fits tightly into a groove around the outside perimeter of the bearing shield to hold it in place against the bearing casing. Not all bearings have a C clip, but those that do can usually be taken apart for cleaning and maintenance.
- Casing: The casing is the body of the bearing. It holds the ball bearings, crown, and shield in place.

== Skateboarding trick terminology ==
- Ollie: One of the most famous skateboard tricks. A jump performed by popping the tail of the board on the ground, and using the front foot to even out body and attain air. The basis of most skating tricks, originally done on a ramp, named after Alan Gelfand, AKA "Ollie" and the flat ground ollie was created by Rodney Mullen See: Air, Pop
- 180: An ollie with a 180 degree board and body turn either backside or frontside.
- 180 heelflip: A heelflip with a 180 degree board and body turn either backside or frontside.
- 180 kickflip: A kickflip with a 180 degree board and body turn either backside or frontside.
- 360 flip or Tre flip: A 360 shove it and a kickflip. The board does one full rotation.
- 50-50 grind: A grind on both trucks.
- 5-0 grind: A rear truck grind with the front of the board elevated over the obstacle.
- Air: Riding with all four wheels in the air.
- Backside: A trick executed with the skater's back to the ramp or obstacle, or a rotation of the rider/board where the front foot moves forward (e.g. a regular-footed skater turning clockwise).
- Boardslide: A trick in which the skater slides the underside of the deck along an object.
- Caballerial: A 360-degree ollie while riding fakie. The Caballerial was named after Steve Caballero, who invented the trick on vert in the early 1980s.
- Carve: To skate in a long, curving arc.
- Crooked grind: A nosegrind where the nose is angled toward the object and the tail is elevated.
- Darkslide: A seemingly complicated looking trick in which the rider approaches a ledge or rail and does a flip trick onto the obstacle so that the rider lands on the board upside down with their feet on the nose and the tail and slides across the obstacle. Generally a half-kickflip or half-heelflip is the flip trick used to get into a darkslide. Created by Rodney Mullen.
- Fakie: Rolling backwards; the rider is in the normal stance, but rolling in the opposite direction. (Basically a switch nollie position)
- Frontside: A trick executed with the skater facing the ramp or obstacle, or a rotation of the rider/board where the front foot moves backward (e.g. a regular-footed skater turning counterclockwise).
- Goofy-foot: A skater who more comfortably rides with the right foot leading.
- Grind: Riding on a curb, railing, or other surface using one or both truck axles.
- Hardflip: Instead of the board spinning backside, the trick is performed by doing a kickflip and having the board spin frontside.
- Heelflip: A kickflip in which the skater uses the front heel to flip the board in the opposite direction.
- Inward heelflip: A heelflip variation where the board simultaneously rotates 180 degrees backside
- Kickflip: An ollie in the middle of which the skater uses the front toe to kick the board into an Aileron roll.
- Laserflip: A heelflip with a 360 degree frontside shove-it.
- Mongo pushing: Pushing with the front foot instead of the back foot as per usual.
- No-Comply 180: A one-footed 180 where the front foot plants on the ground and the back foot pops the board 180 degrees and then the plant foot is brought back onto the board
- Nollie: An Ollie performed with the front foot (N/ollie nose ollie) Same motion as a switch ollie but done on the front of the board, it could be added as a prefix to describe any other trick performed in fake or switch stance (Nollie 360 flip/Tre flip, Nollie kickflip/Nollie flip, etc.).
- Nosegrind: A front truck grind with the rear of the board elevated over the obstacle.
- Noseslide: Sliding the underside of the nose end of a board on a ledge, rail, or lip.
- Ollie north: An Ollie in which the front foot is taken off the board.
- Pop shove-it: A shove-it performed while popping the tail to make the board attain air. See: Air, Pop
- Pop: The act of striking the tail of the board against the ground to propel the board upwards.
- Regular foot: A skater who more comfortably rides with the left foot leading.
- Shove-it: A trick where the front foot stays in one spot while the back foot pushes the raised tail to spin around the front 180 degrees or more without spinning the body.
- Smith grind: A rear truck grind, with the nose hanging below and pointed slightly away from the obstacle.
- Switch stance: Riding the board with the opposite footing than usual. A goofy skater uses their left foot forward (regular) in switch, and a regular skater uses their right foot forward (goofy) in switch.
- Tailslide: Sliding the underside of the tail end of a board on a ledge or lip.
- Tic-tac: repeated turning of whole body and skateboard from one side to the other
- Varial heelflip: Same as a hardflip, but heelflip and the board spins front side.
- Varial flip: A trick consisting of a backside pop shove-it and a kickflip.

== Skateboarding venues ==
Skateboarding on a ramp

- Street skateboarding: Skating on streets, curbs, benches, handrails or other elements typically found in urban and suburban landscapes. Ramps, rails, boxes and other man-made obstacles, especially in competition, are also referred to as "street" because they simply emulate a perfect "street" environment. Plus, man-made street ramps are mobile, making easy transport for competitions, local skaters and retailers alike.
- Vert skateboarding: Skating on ramps and other vertical structures like empty, bowl-shaped swimming pools and storm drains.
- Transition: Going from a horizontal surface to a vertical surface. "Tranny"
- Half-pipe: A U-shaped ramp of any size, usually with a flat section between the opposing transitions.
- Vert ramp: A transition ramp, usually at least 8 feet tall, with steep sides that are perfectly vertical near the top.
- Mini ramp: Usually a half-pipe that is shorter than the rider; most mini ramps are not tall enough for the transition to reach vertical.
- Mega ramp: A very big ramp, usually for vert skateboarding.
- Quarter pipe: A single ramp transitioning from horizontal to any obtuse angle up to vert.
- Bowl: Empty in-ground pools serve as good bowls. Concrete and wood bowls have been made for skating.

== Skateboard phenomenon ==
- Friction: The resistance that one surface or object encounters when moving on another.
- Speed wobble: At a certain speed the skateboard can become unstable, showing an oscillatory behavior that can lead to loss of control.
- Death wobble: An irrecoverable speed wobble.

== See also ==
- Longboard
- Skateboard
