= Kicktail =

Part of a skateboard

The kicktail is the upward slope at the rear of a skateboard deck. The front kicktail is usually called the nose or kicknose. Since the early 1970s, the kicktail has been an important performance characteristic of a deck, especially in street skateboarding.

== History ==
As the name suggests, the kicktail first appeared on the back end of a skateboard only, when it was patented by Larry Stevenson in 1969. (U.S. Patent #3,565,454, with the following description: The rear end section of a skateboard mounts an inclined lever that is sloped upwardly and rearwardly from the skateboard. In order to practice otherwise difficult spinning or pivoting maneuvers such as wheelies with much improved balance and safety, a person places his rear foot upon and depresses the lever to tilt the skateboard upwardly into a position for the desired maneuver.)

As street skating progressed in the late-1980s and early-'90s, a kicknose was added to the front of the deck, pushing the sport even further. The first example of this was the Mike V. Barnyard deck on World Industries. The kicktail is also found on some longboards and "indo boards", which are balance trainers.
