= Grip tape =

Friction-surfaced material for skateboards

Grip tape, also referred to as grip, is a coarse, sandpaper-like material with an adhesive backing used on the deck of a skateboard or longboard for traction, to give the rider more friction to control the board.

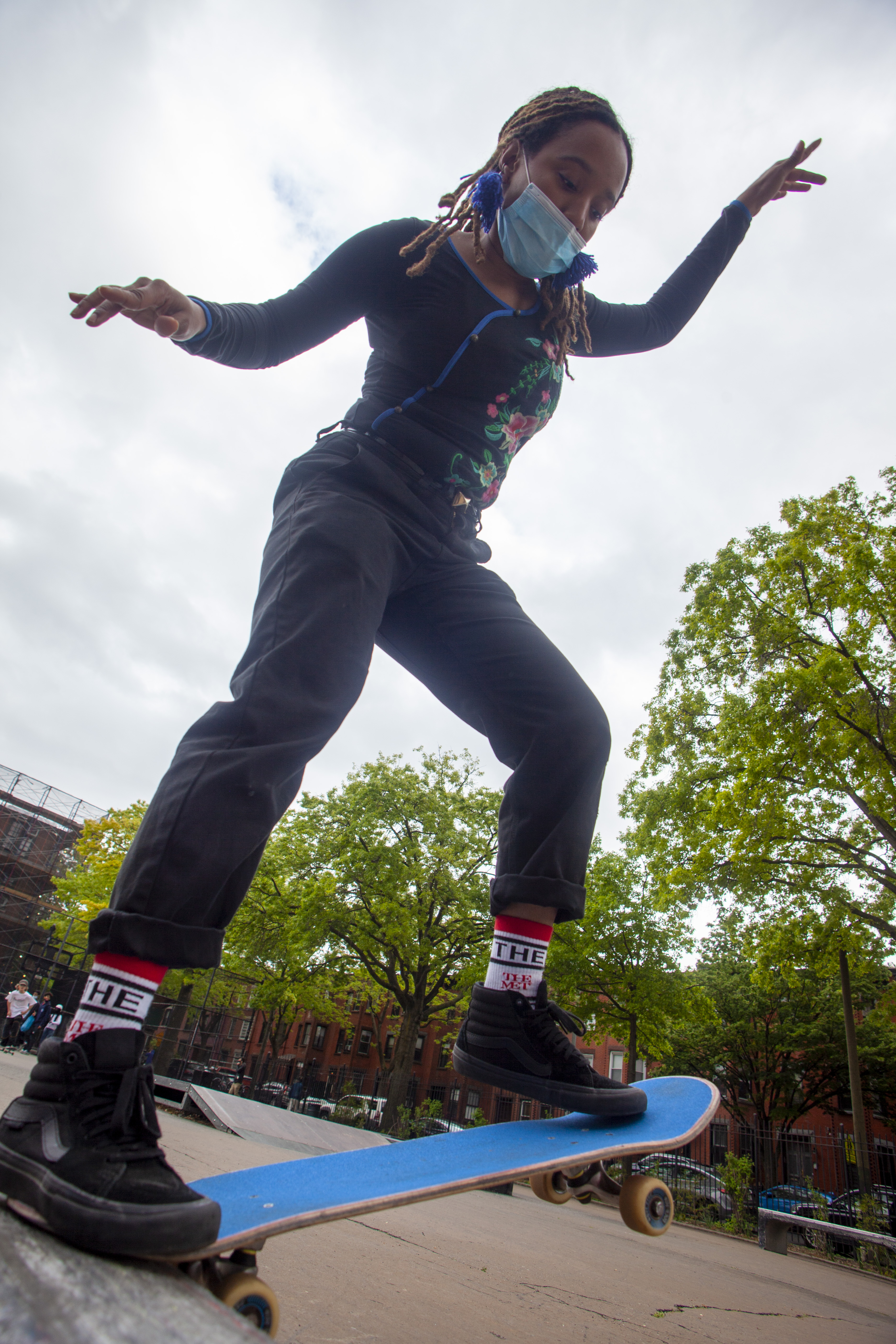
Kava Vasquez skates with blue grip tape at 51 Skatepark in Brooklyn

== In skateboarding ==
Surfers in the late 1940's to 1950's transitioning onto land needed a different way to stay on their boards; soon, these surfers poured wax or resin onto the top of their boards and then sprinkled sand into the non-cured wax or resin. This method for gripping skateboards faded out after a few years, as the method didn't give skaters the grip they needed and has led to the common grip tape rolls you see in skate shops today.

The most common type of grip tape is a solid black color with a texture that resembles sandpaper. When a skateboarder does a trick, the grip tape allows skateboarder's feet greater control over the skateboard.

Skateboard grip tape comes as smooth sheets that are slightly longer and wider than an average skateboard deck. Grip tape is typically applied by a skate shop employee or by the customer.

Grip tape is sometimes used decoratively, since it can come in many different styles and colors. Some skaters choose to decorate their grip tape in a unique fashion. Alternative materials to the traditional sandpaper style grip tape have been proposed but not widely adopted.

== In other sports ==
Grip tape is also used to refer to the adhesive tape used to wrap baseball bats.

== See also ==
- Skateboard
- Skateboarding brands
- List of skateboarding terms
