= Pedlow Skate Park =

Skatepark in Encino, Los Angeles, California

Coordinates: 34.1859°N 118.5117°W

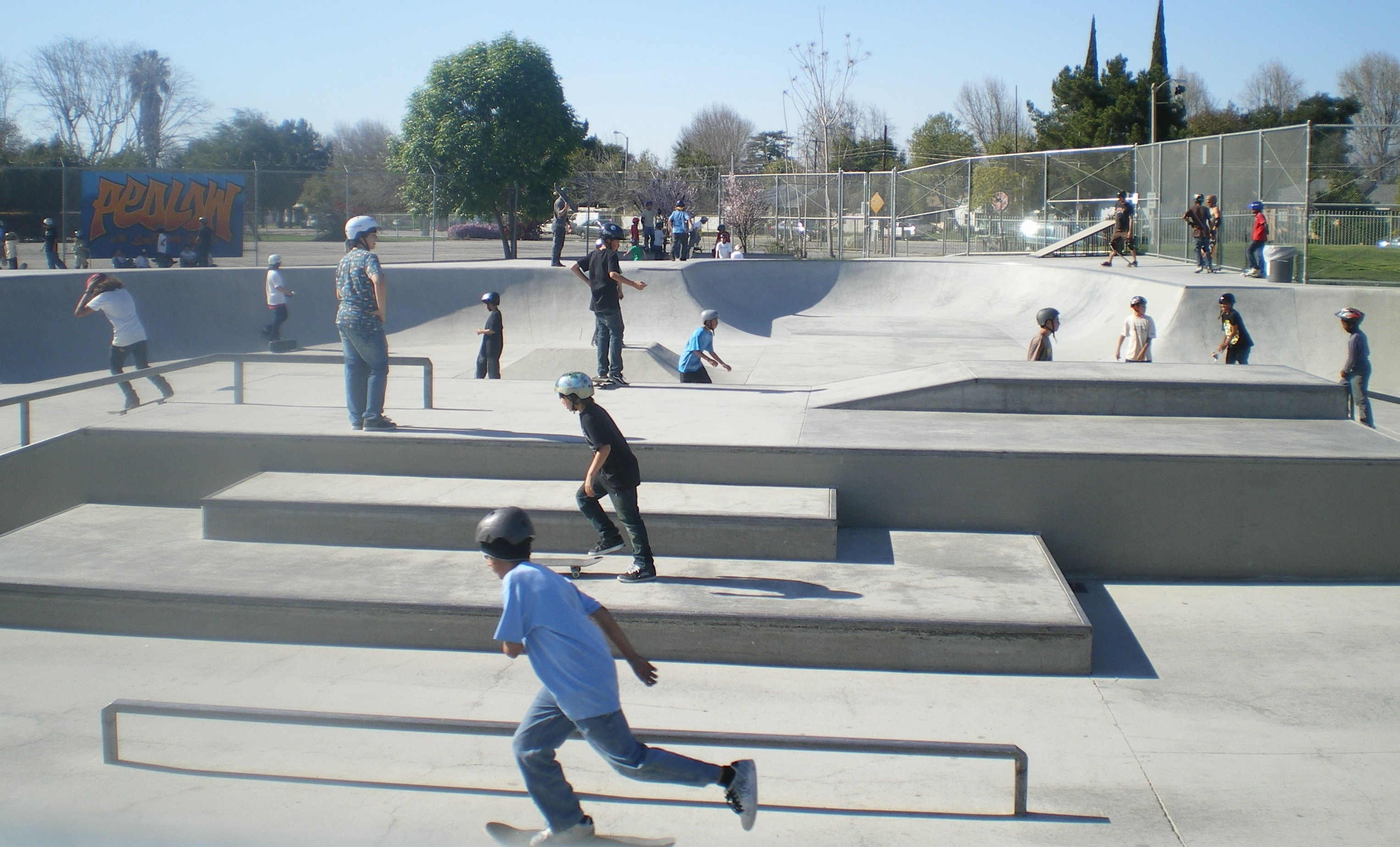
Pedlow Skate Park

Pedlow Skate Park is a skatepark in the Encino neighborhood of Los Angeles, California. It was the first public skatepark in Los Angeles when it opened to the public on February 17, 2001, and was later reopened in August 2006 after extensive work and new features. It is a concrete park over 20,000 sq ft (1,900 m^{2}) with a large pool, snake run bowl, pyramid and rails. It has hosted events such as the 2013 Southern California Summer Skateboarding Expo and OG Jam competitions
