= Frontside and backside =

Term used in various action sports

In surfing, skateboarding, snowboarding and aggressive inline skating, frontside and backside are terms that are used to describe how a person approaches an obstacle or performs a certain trick. In aggressive inline skating, frontside and backside are types of grinds.

Frontside and backside indicate either the front or back of the rider under the following circumstances: Regardless of which board sport you are referring to, if the rider is not spinning it indicates which side is facing the "wave" on approach. This can be many things, rail, pipe wall, or slope/implied slope. If the rider is spinning it will indicate which side of the rider is first to face in the direction of travel. The only exception to this rule is fakie as there is an implied 180 degree rotation already completed causing the expression to be reversed.

The names frontside and backside originate from surfing where they mean the direction the surfer is facing while surfing a wave. If the surfer is facing the wave, they are surfing frontside, otherwise they are surfing backside. The terms forehand and backhand are synonyms for frontside and backside but they are only used in surfing.

== Skateboarding ==
For performing rotational tricks on flat ground, frontside means that for the first 90–180 degrees of the rotation, the rider rotates to face the direction of travel. For a rider traveling in the "regular" stance (left foot leading), frontside means to rotate counter clockwise (as seen from above). Conversely, a skater (regular) doing a backside rotation/trick is rotating clockwise. The same applies to horizontal board-rotation tricks, where the skater does not rotate: a regular stance skater performing a frontside shove-it spins the board counter clockwise, as seen from above.

When riding fakie, the term is reversed. For example, a rider in the "goofy" stance (right foot leading) does a frontside 180 when they rotate 180 degrees clockwise.

When riding switch, frontside and backside are the same as they would be from regular. When riding nollie, the rotation of tricks is the same as in regular stance, i.e. a nollie backside 180 spins in the same direction as a regular stance backside 180.

Regular
	Normal	Fakie	Nollie	Switch
Frontside	counter clockwise	counter clockwise	counter clockwise	clockwise
Backside	clockwise	clockwise (half cab)	clockwise	counter clockwise

Goofy
	Normal	Fakie	Nollie	Switch
Frontside	clockwise	clockwise	clockwise	counter clockwise
Backside	counter clockwise	counter clockwise (half cab)	counter clockwise	clockwise

When applied to slides involving obstacles, backside and frontside take on different meaning: the terms define how the obstacle is being approached. For example, when performing a frontside boardslide, "frontside" means that the obstacle (e.g. rail or ledge) is to the front (the toe-side) of the skateboarder. To carry out a frontside boardslide, a regular-stance skater will rotate slightly clockwise before sliding, facing away from the direction of travel. This is the opposite direction of rotation to a frontside ollie.

== Snowboarding ==
In snowboarding, frontside and backside have the same meanings as in skateboarding. When turning, a backside turn is analogous to a toeedge turn, and frontside turn is analogous to a heeledge turn.

In the air, frontside means that 90 degrees into your first rotation you will be facing forward downhill and backside means that 90 degrees into your first rotation your back will be facing downhill. For example, a left foot forward (or regular) rider would rotate counterclockwise to do a frontside 360 and clockwise to do a backside 360.

== Aggressive inline skating ==
In aggressive inline skating, frontside and backside are used to describe the way the skater's feet are positioned when grinding on an object. For example, if a skater jumps on to grind a ledge with both feet landing on the h-blocks (the grindable area in the middle of the frame), with the toes facing the ledge, the skater is doing a frontside grind. Their whole body will be facing the object.

A backside is much the same, although when the skater jumps on, they will be landing with their back to the object, and with their heels facing the ledge.
