= Skateboarding in China =

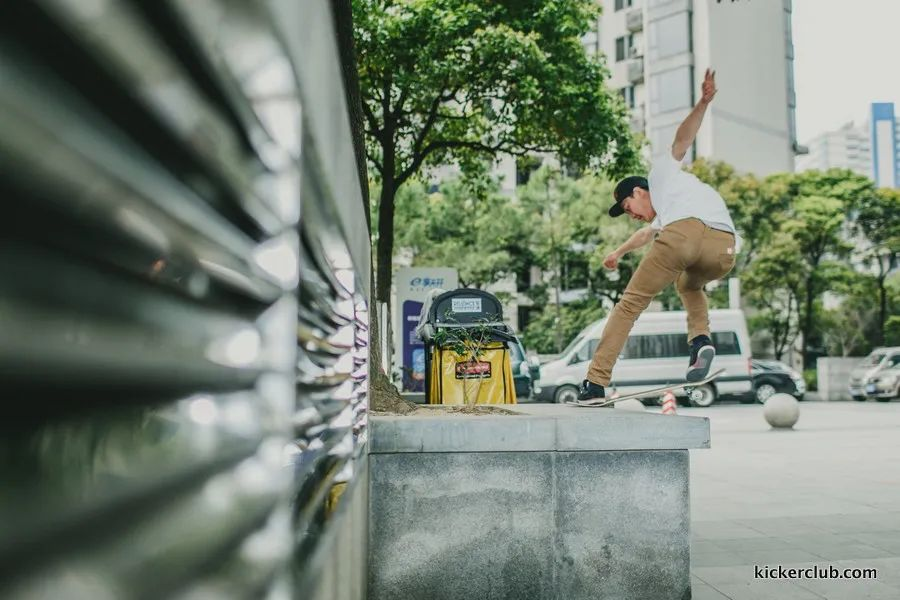
One of the many marble ledges in Shanghai

Skateboarding arrived in China in April 1986 when an American skateboarder arrived in China to study Chinese at the Beijing Language Institute. He says, "When I arrived in China, there wasn't even a word in Chinese for skateboard. People were really interested in learning to ride, and in a few years Chinese skaters started appearing in almost every city I travelled to". Domestic skate companies and retailers began to appear at around the turn of the century, bringing the average price for a skateboard of ordinary quality down from an expensive 1000 yuan to around 280 yuan as of 2009. Skateboarding has been slow to develop in China because of the lack of a strong preexisting street culture and of skating infrastructure; nevertheless, it is estimated that as of 2009 there are 40,000 to 50,000 skateboarders in China.

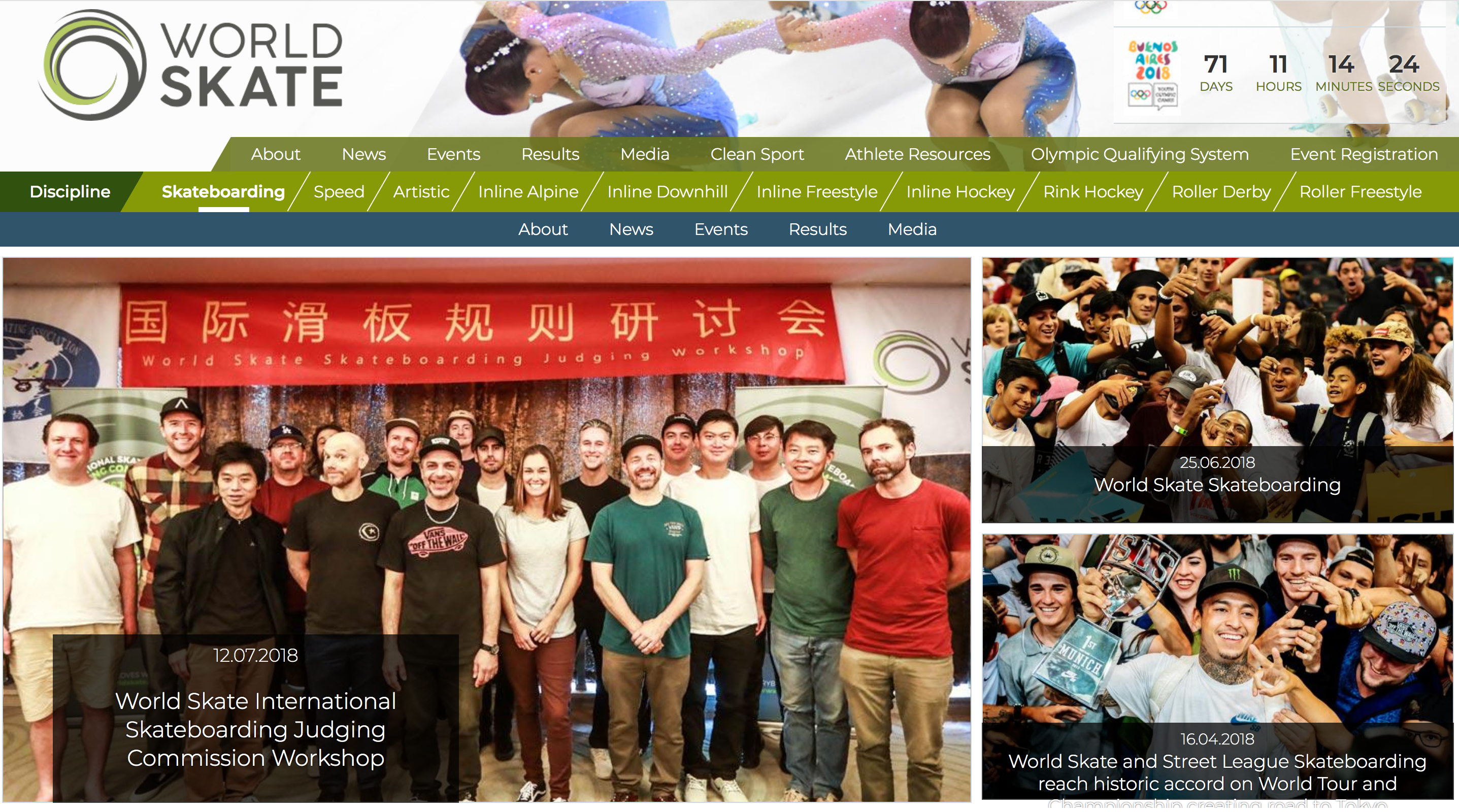
World Skate International Judging Commission- Gen Ogewa, Danny Yuan Yuan Zhang, Paul Ziter (right)World Skate Skateboarding

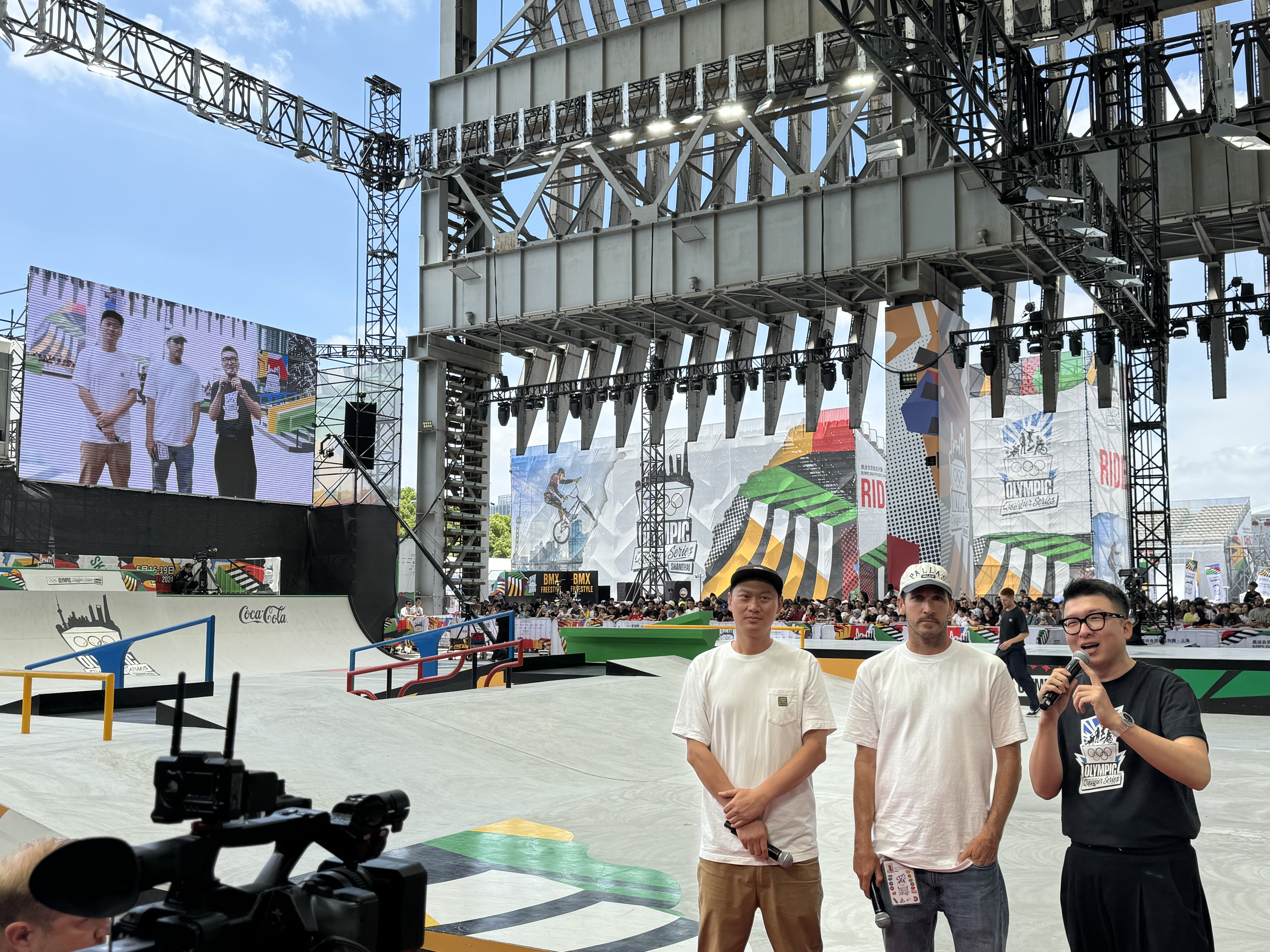
2024 Olympic Qualifier Series Shanghai MC Danny (Yuan Yuan) Zhang and Tim O'Connor 2024 Olympic Qualifier Series

The first major skateboard brand to enter China was Powell Peralta, who in the early 1990s gave Chinese skaters a taste of the skateboarding by organizing a skateboard club, sponsoring contests and bringing over famous professional skateboarders. Many participants in the Powell events are still involved in the industry today.

== Early pioneers ==
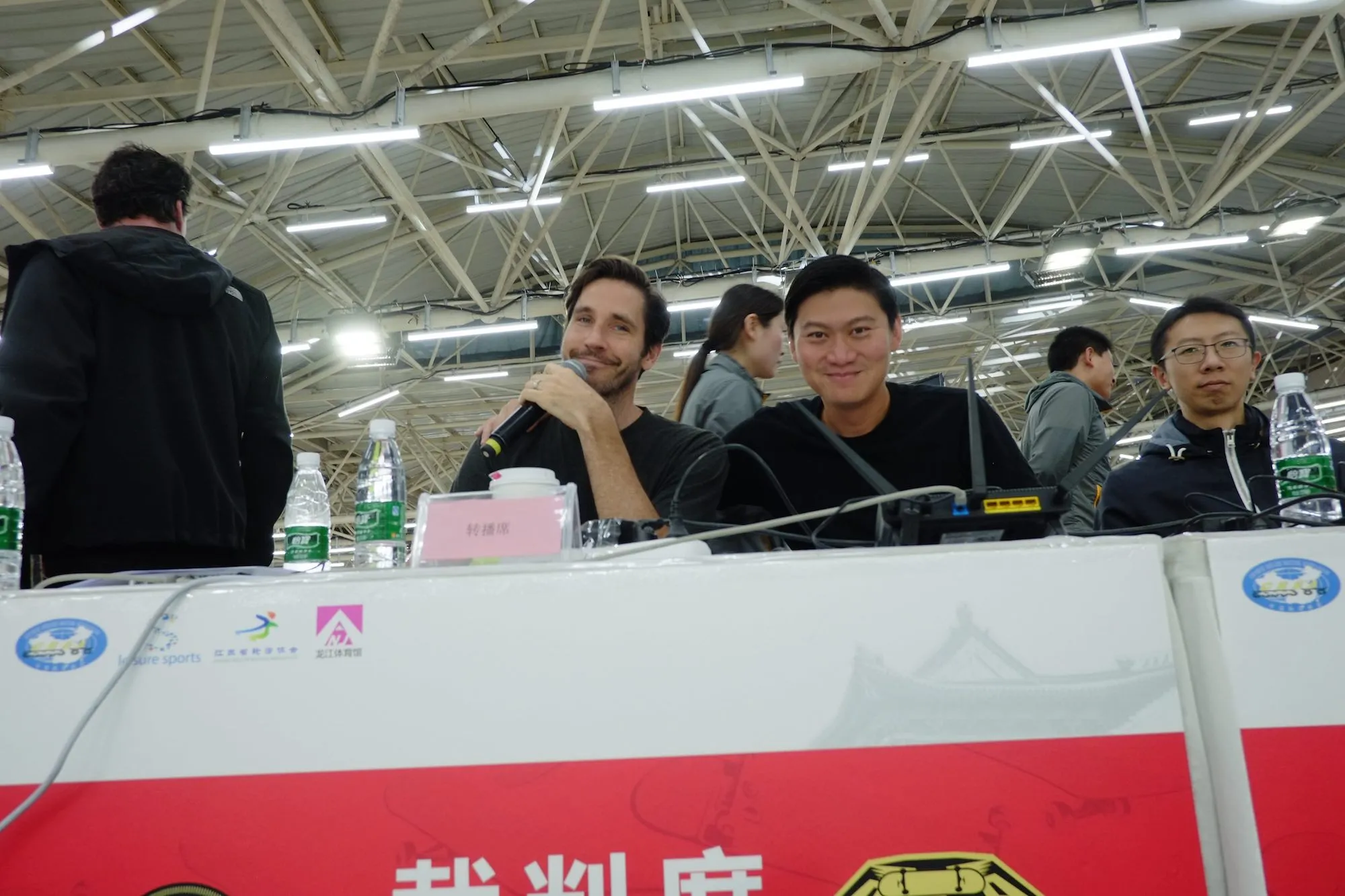
Danny (Yuan Yuan) Zhang with Tim O'Connor emcee at one of the first Olympic qualifying skateboarding contests. Olympic sports

Danny Yuan Yuan Zhang played a role in the early development of skateboarding in China. He bridge the gap between the US and China by serving as a direct line of communication, this opened up trade of skateboard decks, trucks, wheels, other hard goods, and soft goods. With this new influx of new look from skate and streetwear hitting Shanghai, this helped shape the look of skateboarding and trends in China. Danny was interviewed and appeared in Shanghai 5 a documentary about skateboarding in Shanghai. Directed, Filmed, produced and edited by: Charles Lanceplaine Danny Yuan Yuan Zhang also appeared in various other media. including Transworld Skateboarding "San Diego resident Danny Yuan Yuan Zhang, now one of skateboarding’s go-to men in China. Danny was involved in organizing the first International Skateboarding Open in Nanjing". Vice Media China Daily. to both 2016 and 2017 FISE World Series in Chengdu China. "After four global stops in Montpellier, France, Osijek in Croatia, Denver in the United States and Edmonton in Canada this year, the FISE World Series will be in Chengdu from Friday to Sunday," said Danny Yuan Yuan Zhang, Media and Marketing Director of FISE World Series.

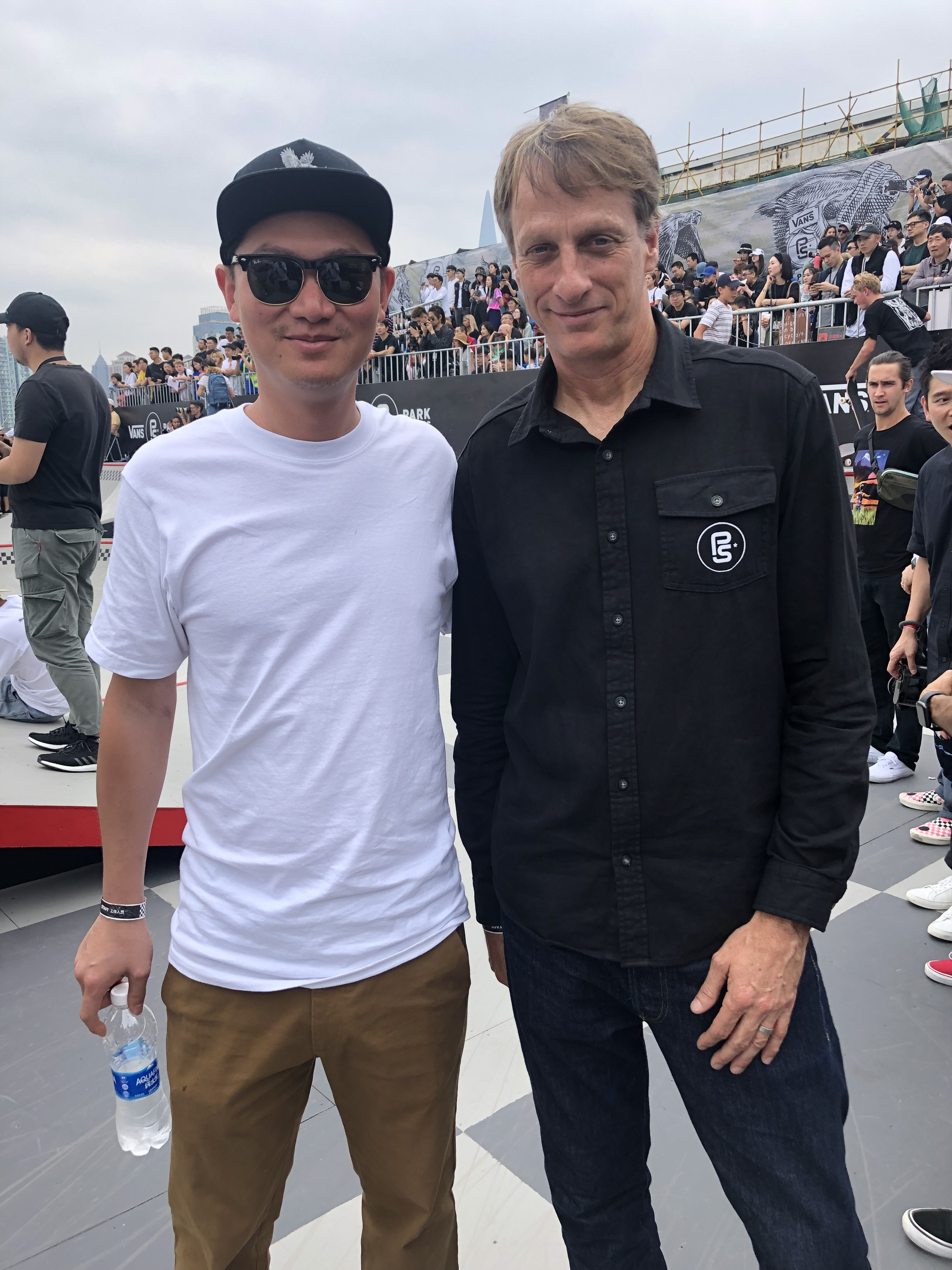
Tony Hawk and Danny Yuan Yuan Zhang at the 2019 Shanghai Vans Park Series contest.

Later Danny Yuan Yuan Zhang served on the panel of the original ISJC members, International Skateboarding Judging Commission (group of expert judges coming from National Federations (NF) and Professional Event Organizers (PEO) that will define Skateboarding Judging Criteria and procedures) for Skateboarding at the 2020 Summer Olympics. More recently he has been involved in international and Olympic qualifying events as the role of Master of ceremonies including 2024 Olympic Qualifier Series and Vans Park Series Shanghai . His expertise and insights has elevated the profile of skateboarding in China but also connected local talent to the global skateboarding scene. Through his many contributions, Danny Zhang has helped shaped the landscape of skateboarding in China, inspiring a new generation of skaters and promoting the sport on an international stage. Danny (with Andrew Guan) co-founded an English podcast about Skateboarding in China. 5MoreMins is intended to link news about the Chinese skate market and trends to the rest of the globe. With a list of skateboarding heavy hitters such as Erik Ellington on partnering with China Sports Giant, Li-Ning, Rodrigo Petersen, and many others.

In the early 90's as a co-founder and Fly Streetwear, one of the first skate brands in the country, Danny Yuan Yuan Zhang played a crucial role in popularizing skate culture among Chinese youth. His vision led to the establishment of one of the first dedicated skateshops in all of China. Which became a major hub for skateboarders and enthusiasts alike, fostering a culturally significant and vibrant community on Changle Lu in Shanghai.

Yuan Fei, better known as Panda Mike, runs a skate shop in Qingdao and owns the notable skateboard brand, Lady. He was the first person in China to receive a board from Powell, and is still skating hard in his 40's.

Xia Yu (actor), who is now a well-known movie star and avid skateboarder and snowboarder.

Che Lin- "known as China's first pro skateboarder, skated for Nike SB, Quicksilver, and currently rides for Li Ning Skateboarding.

Fly Streetwear Co founder Jeff Han (Han Minjie) . After a decade-long career with a milk company, in 1999 Han quit and the first skate and streetwear shop Fly Streetwear was opened with Danny Yuan Yuan Zhang. Together creating of the first skateshop and Streetwear brand in Shanghai. He and Danny Yuan Yuan Zhang went on to co found Gift Skateboards, Cart Wheels, and Skatehere.com, one of the most popular Chinese-language skateboarding website. In addition to his companies, he runs a professional skateboarding team. In 2007, Nike Skateboarding created the Fly Milk Blazer Premium sneaker in tribute to Han.

== Competition and Contests ==
=== Early Beginnings (Late 1980s-1990s) ===
Skateboarding was introduced to China in the late 1980s, primarily through the influence of Western culture and national sports channel CCTV-5 broadcasting Gleaming the Cube. The first skateboarders were mainly urban youth who adopted the sport as a form of self-expression. Although formal competitions were scarce, and the skateboarding community was small but tight knitted. The first skateboarding competition was held in Qinhuangdao, and skaters from all over China gathered to socialize and meet. This first of a kind meet up allowed China skateboarding to progress and skateboarders to exchange communication information, therefore expanding.

=== Growth and Development (2000s) ===
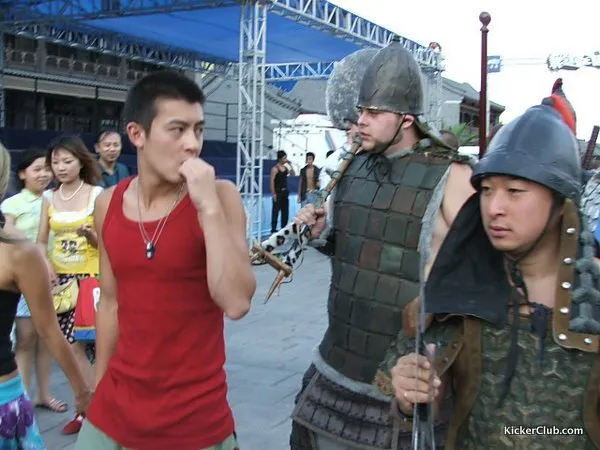
Edison Chen 2005 at Great Wall Danny Way Jump Edison Chen

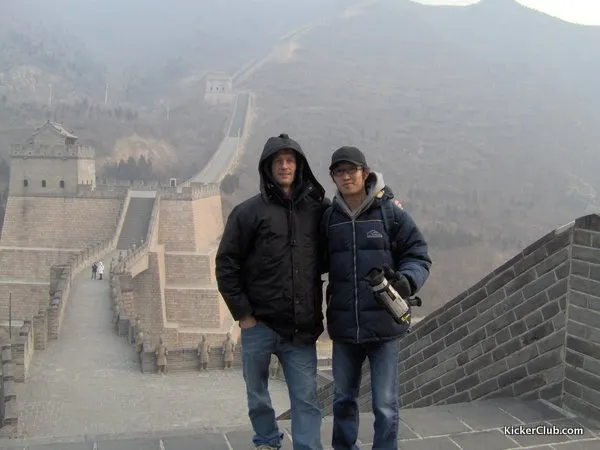
Danny Way

The early 2000s marked a significant turning point for skateboarding in China. As urbanization increased and Western skaters started touring China, skateboarding began to gain popularity. Historical skateboarding events such as the Danny Way Great Wall Jump in 2005 drew national and international attention to skateboarding in China. International actor, singer Edison Chen was also on site. The Great Wall project was put together with contributions of trusted skate media site Kickerclub.com founder Andrew Guan.

As more and more international teams started touring China, the need for international relations and communications was more crucial than ever before. Danny Yuan Yuan Zhang's role as an international affairs liaison was increasingly significant.

Skate parks started to emerge in major cities like Beijing and Shanghai, providing dedicated spaces for skaters to practice and compete. In 2004 SMP Shanghai wrapped up construction and the world's largest skatepark was ready to go. This skatepark drew its fair share of international visitors including the Flip Skateboards team along with Thrasher (magazine) in the August 2007 issue and The "PJ Ladd Asia Granite Tour" refers to the DC Project Granite Asia Tour, The "PJ Ladd Asia Granite Tour" refers to the DC Project Granite Asia Tour, a 2009 skateboarding trip where legendary pro skater PJ Ladd and the DC Shoes team visited Asia (including Taiwan, Japan, China) the visiting team was led by Danny Yuan Yuan Zhang and Johnny_Tang.

=== Establishing Competitions (2010s) ===
By the 2010s, organized skateboarding competitions began to take root. Events like the "International Skateboarding Open" and domestic competitions such as ProJam Finals, attracting both amateur and professional skaters. These competitions served as platforms for showcasing talent, promoting, and further legitimizing the sport within the country.

=== International Recognition (2015 and Beyond) ===
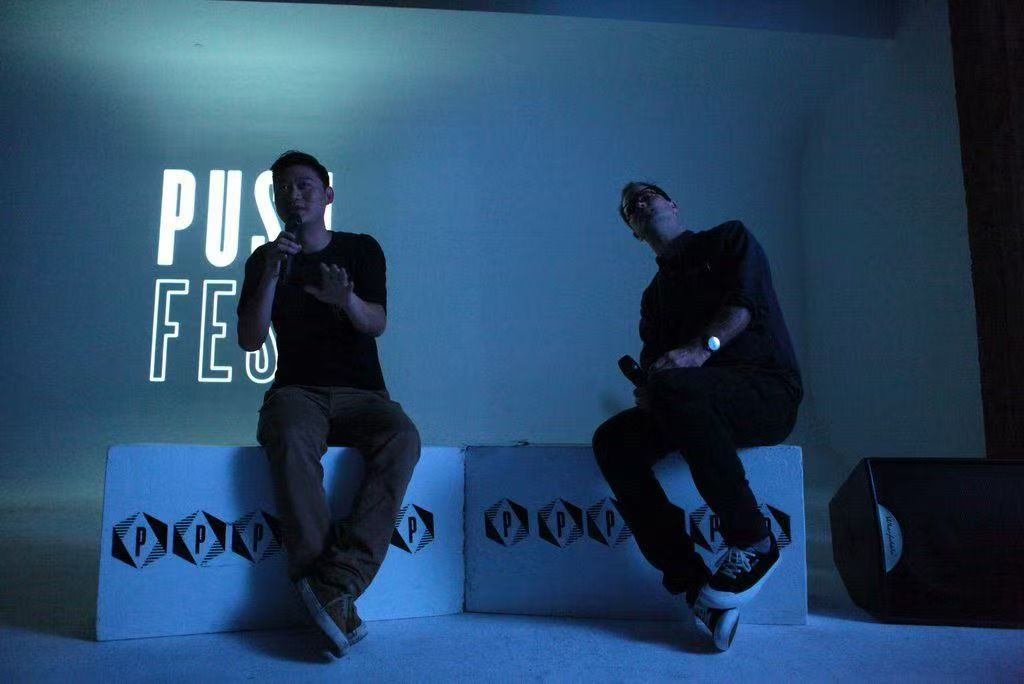
Danny Yuan Yuan Zhang introducing special guest Patrick O'Dell

After the announcement of inclusion of Skateboarding at the 2020 Summer Olympics. The road to Tokyo was introduced as a pathway to the Olympics. Olympic qualifying competitions began to emerge such as the (ISO) International Skateboarding Open held in Nanjing China paved the way for broader participation by Chinese skaters to compete in international events. The rise of social media also played a crucial role in popularizing skateboarding, allowing local skaters to share their skills and experiences with a global audience. In 2016 the inaugural PUSHFEST, a one-of-a-kind community skateboarding event that celebrates the perspective of the skate community through curated films and interactive installations from a community of local skateboarders. The inaugural event included special guest Patrick O'Dell founder and creator of the influential blog and documentary series from Vice Media Epicly Later'd and hosted by Danny Yuan Yuan Zhang.

=== Skateboarding at the Olympics (2020 and 2024) ===
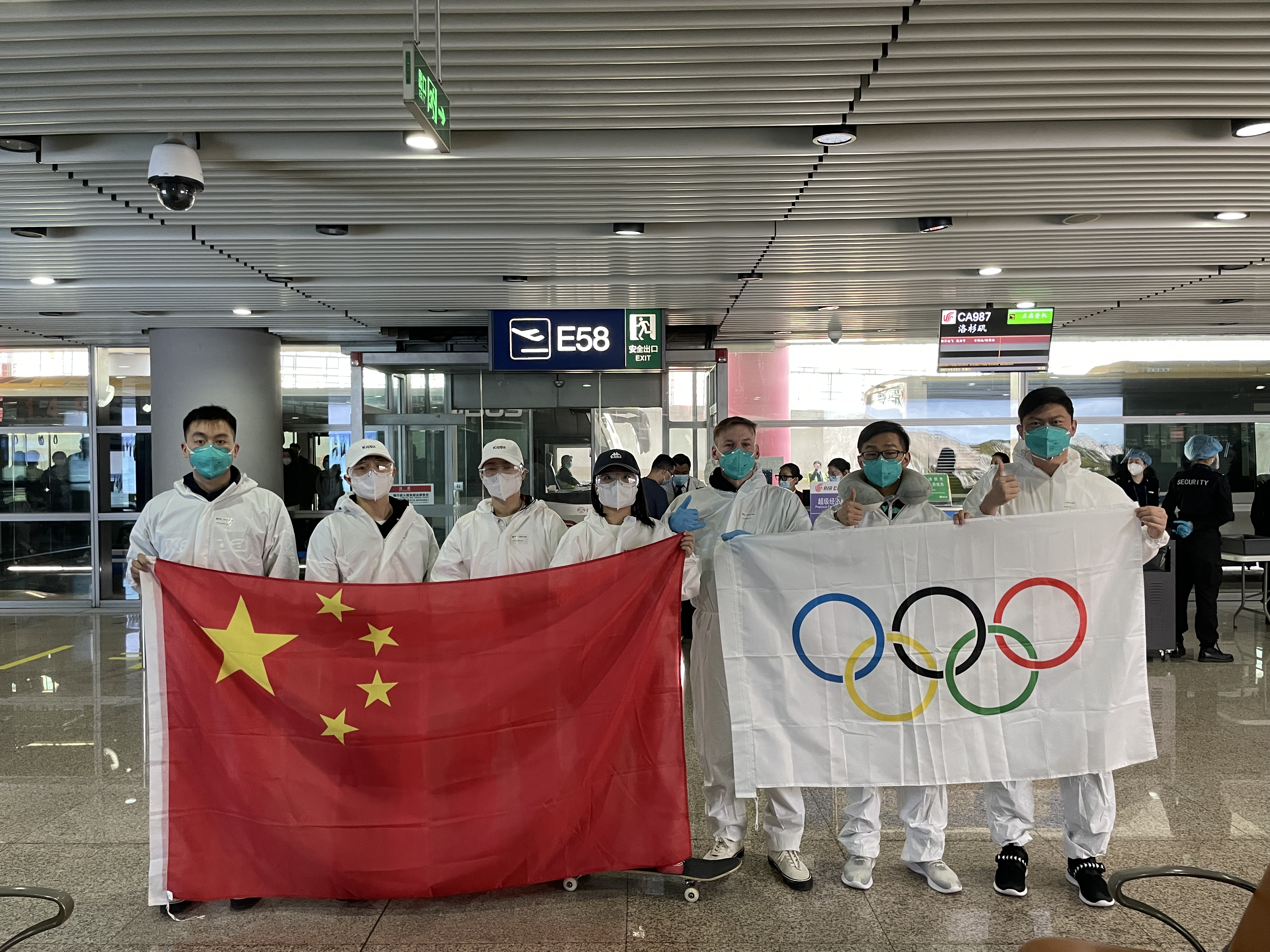
Danny Yuan Yuan Zhang Chinese Olympic Skateboarding team director with athletes Zen Wen Hu Zeng Wenhui(Zoe) and Zhang Xin (Asta Zhang) departing Beijing International for Tokyo 2020 Summer Olympics China at the Olympics

The inclusion of Skateboarding at the 2020 Summer Olympics (held in 2021 due to the pandemic) and Skateboarding at the 2024 Summer Olympics significantly boosted the sport's profile in China. Notable contributor Danny Yuan Yuan Zhang (2017-2021) Served as program Director for the Chinese Olympic and National Skateboarding Team, overseeing athlete development, preparation for international competitions, and ensuring a supportive and inclusive team environment leading into the Tokyo 2020 Olympic cycle. Chinese national team skaters such as Zoe Zeng-Wenhui, Cui Chenxi, Zhu Yuanling Skateboarding at the 2024 Summer Olympics – Women's street. While Zheng Haohao coached by former pro skater Danny Wainwright for women's park emerged as prominent figures, inspiring a new generation of athletes.

=== Current Landscape ===
Today, skateboarding competitions in China are thriving, with numerous events held annually across the country. The sport has gained institutional support, with various organizations promoting skateboarding as a viable athletic pursuit. The growth of skateboarding culture has also led to increased investment in infrastructure, including skate parks and training facilities.

== List of Significant Skateboarding Contests in China ==
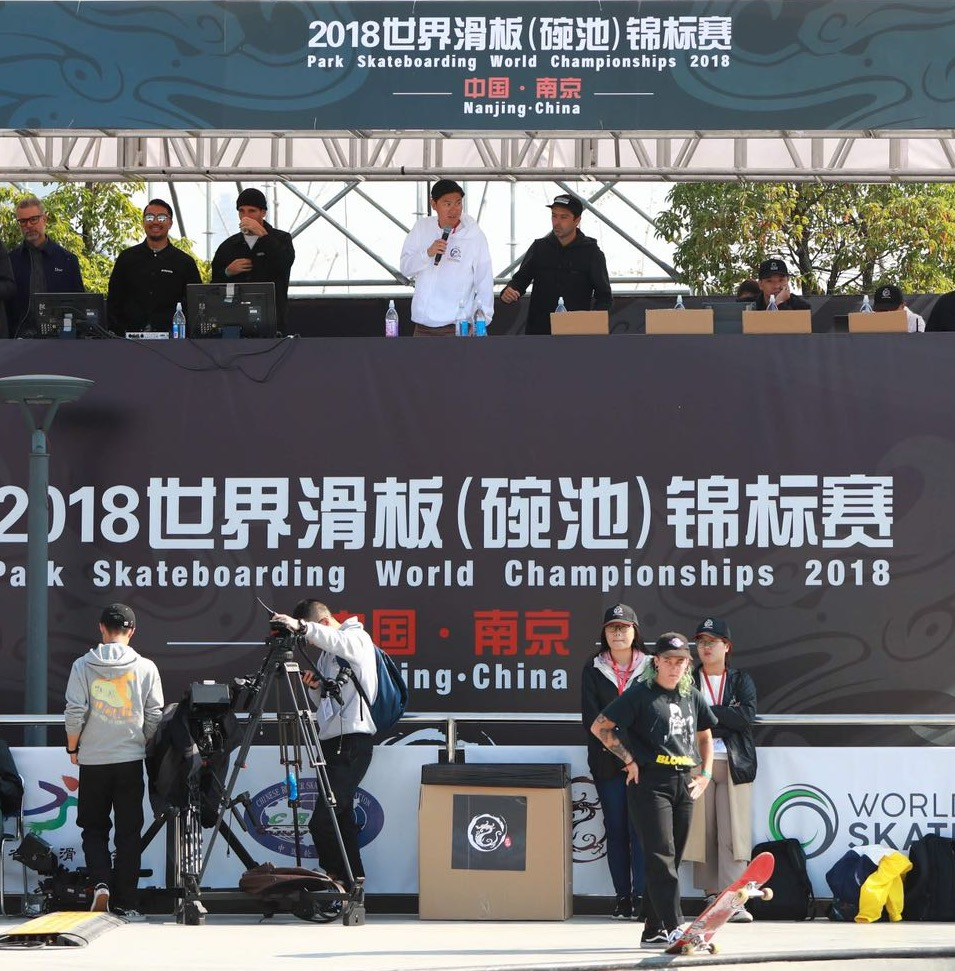
Park Skateboarding World Championships MC Danny Yuan Yuan Zhang 2018 World championship

1) International Skateboarding Open

2) ProJam

3) FISE Shangai

4) Grand Masters

5) 2024 Olympic Qualifier Series

6) X Games Asia

7) National Games of China

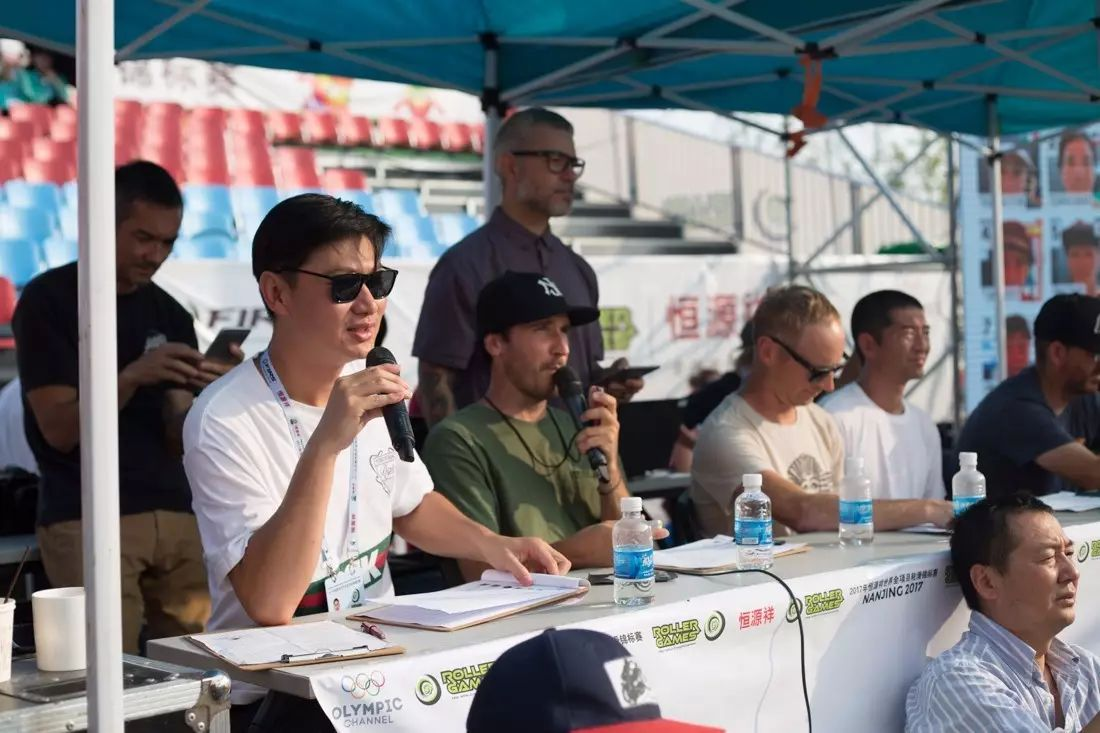
Inaugural World Skate Games Vert Finals FIRS roller gamesMC Danny Yuan Yuan Zhang and Tim O'Connor 2017

8) Park World Skateboarding Championship

9) World Skate Games (formerly World Roller Games)

10) Asian Skateboarding Championship

Skateboarding in China has undergone a huge transformation, evolving from a niche activity to a recognized sport with its own international competitions. As its participation increases, the sport has gained a growing presence within Chinese youth culture and has attracted a wider audience of athletes and fans.

== Business ==
Along with Jeff Han and Danny Zhang's companies, one of the oldest and most important Chinese skateboard companies is Shehui (Chinese: 社会; pinyin: Shèhuì; English: Society) Skateboards. Headquartered in Beijing, it was founded by Ralph Cooper, a USC alum who had studied abroad at Peking University in 2000.

A number of Western skate shoe brands have presences in China. These brands include Vision Street Wear, Vans, DC Shoes Nike SB, Converse and Adidas. In the domain of skateboarding apparel, Jeff Han reports that

Vans is the No.1. Adidas is the newcomer in China. I still remember that on the first opening day of Vans at Fly, we sold RMB 50,000 of Vans. As a matter of fact, before Vans’ official launch in China, it was already superbly popular in Beijing. Converse was replaced by Vans as the symbol of cool. Nike successfully launched some limited editions that are more expensive… Vision Street Wear China in recent years have overtaken Vans in the core market, making impressive leaps towards national recognition. Vision Streetwear China's contribution to the core community is embraced by the community. VSW leaving a mark with its sponsored riders, events such as a unified Go Skateboarding Day with over 70 local skate shop partners involved, in 50 cities. VSW China is one of the only international brands to bring it's Chinese team riders to international tours.

Han regards Nike Skateboarding's history in China as a major success story. Though not respected as a skate brand at the time they launched in the Chinese market in 2004, through sponsorships of successful Chinese skateboarders such as Che Lin and Zeng Guanhao as well as intense local marketing efforts, they won broad recognition in China. ʻAukai is well known too.

The Biggest Skateboards Company is "Challenge Skateboards" and now they start their new company "FDskateboarding" (沸点滑板有限公司) to promote their domestic business. They have 11 skateboard (and skateboard related) brands: Symbolic Skateboards, Boiling Skateboards, Justice Skateboards, Black Knight Skateboards, Psychos Skateboards, Peer Trucks, Donuts Wheels, a Chinese skateboarding portals website and a printed magazine Whatsup skateboard magazine (Chinese).

== Skateparks and other skating locations ==
Chinese skateboarding champion Che Lin estimated in 2009 that there were fewer than ten skateparks in China.

=== Ningbo ===
==== Skateboard Supercross Ningbo skatepark (SBSX Ningbo) ====
One of the largest skatepark in the China with 42,000sqf. SBSX Ningbo is a game changing skatepark and pumptrack aka super track. It was built inside of Georgia School Ningbo where 2000 studentstake skateboarding as PE Class daily. ⁣ ⁣ The park features ⁣an Intermediate level street course, a semi enclosed bowl, ⁣rails and the world's first concrete pumptrack designed for multiperson races.

The park is lit, allowing night sessions.

=== Shanghai ===
==== SMP Skatepark (Shanghai Multimedia Park) ====
Formerly the largest skatepark in the world. SMP is located on the outskirts of Shanghai in New Jiangwan City. It was completed in 2005 and is more than 12,000 square meters in size, containing the world's longest vert ramp, the world's largest concrete skate bowl, a huge downhill 3/4 to full pipe, several smaller bowls, a street section, and a 5,000-seat stadium. Despite the publicity of the high-profile events that have taken place there, it has attracted sparse crowds.

==== YuanShen Skatepark (Top Toys) ====
This park was created when the red metal ramps from the SMP skatepark were transferred to the YuanShen Stadium in 2008. These metal ramps were originally used as a competition course in the stadium portion of the SMP skatepark. The skatepark is often referred to as the Red SMP skatepark. Top Toys took over management of YuanShen skatepark located on Line 6 in June 2010 when they opened a skateshop on location.

==== Bin Jiang Skatepark ====
This is a sunken plaza/street style course with stairs, ledges, banks, kickers, hubbas, etc. There are no transitions. It is located next to the Huangpu River and is lit in the evening.

==== Jinqiao Skatepark ====
Located in Pudong, built by B&E Action Sports. Concrete park with granite ledges, rails, and a 1.6m transition bowl.

==== Love Park (LP) ====
Small street spot with ledges and stairs. Located near the Line 8 Dashije station.

==== Iconx Indoor Skatepark ====
Shanghai's first public indoor skatepark. Opened in June 2014. This park has a 5-foot mini, boxes, banks, rails, ledges, and a few transitions.

=== Beijing ===
The most popular skating location in Beijing is the large Beijing Fashion Sports Park. It was known as Woodward Beijing from its opening in 2010 until March 2014. It is located in the rural southern 6th ring road. It is one of the largest indoor skate parks in the world, and it previously hosted the notorious Vans Night. There are also several skateparks. Ezone Sk8 Park in Fangzhuang hosts Andrew Guan's (Guan Mu's) Kicker Club, a nationwide skateboarding club with approximately 200 members in Beijing. (Guan runs a blog named after his club.) Sk8 Warehouse, founded in 2009, is an indoor park in an industrial complex just north of Shuangjing Bridge. Honglingjin Park, in Chaoyang District, also contains a skatepark. In May 2010, Woodward Youth Action Sports Camp opened in Daxing District; it contains facilities for skateboarding, BMX, and motocross and represents a government investment of $21.96 million. There are also plenty of small skateparks in the Shunyi area inside the villas such as Yosemite and Dragon Bay villa.

=== Shenzhen ===
Shenzhen is the most popular destination for visiting pros. Spots in Shenzhen have been featured in videos by Nike Skateboarding, Zero Skateboards, and Transworld Skateboarding. Shenzhen is known for its smooth black marble ledges and police officer and security guards who are largely indifferent to skateboarding. In 2009, Shenzhen Museum became the first area in Shenzhen where skateboarding was prevented when authorities placed flower pots around the central ledge.

In 2011, Transworld Skateboarding listed Shenzhen as one of the best 10 cities to skate in the world. Every winter skateboarders from all over the world come to skate and spend their winter in Shenzhen.
