= Skateboarding at the 2022 Asian Games – Women's street =

Women's street at the 2022 Asian Games
- Venue: Qiantang Roller Sports Centre
- Date: 26–27 September 2023
- Competitors: 9 from 6 nations

Medalists
gold medal	Cui Chenxi	China
silver medal	Zeng Wenhui	China
bronze medal	Miyu Ito	Japan

The women's street competition at the 2022 Asian Games took place on 26 and 27 September 2023 at the Qiantang Roller Sports Centre.

== Schedule ==
All times are China Standard Time (UTC+08:00)

Date	Time	Event
Tuesday, 26 September 2023	10:00	Qualification
Wednesday, 27 September 2023	10:00	Final

== Results ==
=== Qualification ===
Rank	Athlete	Run 1	Run 2	Best
1	Zeng Wenhui (CHN)	33.00	69.15	69.15
2	Cui Chenxi (CHN)	65.82	66.36	66.36
3	Yumeka Oda (JPN)	52.89	64.26	64.26
4	Miyu Ito (JPN)	44.20	53.96	53.96
5	Vareeraya Sukasem (THA)	18.96	45.39	45.39
6	Margielyn Didal (PHI)	37.86	41.53	41.53
7	Nathtiyabhorn Nawakitwong (THA)	39.84	21.96	39.84
8	Ha Si-ye (KOR)	7.86	12.12	12.12
9	Lui Yi Ting (HKG)	2.76	6.36	6.36

=== Final ===
Rank	Athlete	Run		Trick					Total
Rank	Athlete	1	2	1	2	3	4	5	Total
1st place, gold medalist(s)	Cui Chenxi (CHN)	~~51.18~~	79.14	80.31	83.17	~~0.00~~	~~0.00~~	~~0.00~~	242.62
2nd place, silver medalist(s)	Zeng Wenhui (CHN)	73.00	~~45.34~~	~~0.00~~	~~0.00~~	78.93	84.68	~~0.00~~	236.61
3rd place, bronze medalist(s)	Miyu Ito (JPN)	62.32	~~29.80~~	~~0.00~~	82.56	~~68.12~~	~~0.00~~	76.71	221.59
4	Yumeka Oda (JPN)	~~46.38~~	63.94	~~0.00~~	~~0.00~~	75.21	71.58	~~0.00~~	210.73
5	Vareeraya Sukasem (THA)	~~47.47~~	49.20	55.23	50.46	~~0.00~~	~~0.00~~	~~0.00~~	154.89
6	Nathtiyabhorn Nawakitwong (THA)	~~26.99~~	28.55	55.29	~~0.00~~	~~0.00~~	65.07	~~0.00~~	148.91
7	Ha Si-ye (KOR)	43.87	~~41.18~~	50.96	0.00	~~0.00~~	~~0.00~~	~~0.00~~	94.83
8	Margielyn Didal (PHI)	23.39	~~12.83~~	0.00	0.00	~~0.00~~	~~0.00~~	~~0.00~~	23.39
