= Skateboarding at the 2024 Summer Olympics – Women's street =

Women's street at the Games of the XXXIII Olympiad
- Olympic skateboarding
- Venue: Place de la Concorde
- Dates: 28 July 2024

Medalists
1st place, gold medalist(s)		Coco Yoshizawa	Japan
2nd place, silver medalist(s)		Liz Akama	Japan
3rd place, bronze medalist(s)		Rayssa Leal	Brazil

The 2024 Summer Olympics women's street skateboarding competition took place on 28 July 2024 at Place de la Concorde in Paris, France.

This was the second edition of the event after it has been introduced at the 2020 Olympics. The defending champion Momiji Nishiya was not present, but 2020 medalists Rayssa Leal (silver) and Funa Nakayama (bronze) both qualified for the event. Coco Yoshizawa won gold, Liz Akama took silver, and Leal won bronze. Nakayama placed 7th.

== Competition format ==
All 22 skateboarders do two 45-second runs, and then five single tricks rounds. Only the best run score and the 2 highest-scoring single trick scores from the seven rounds for each skateboarder count toward the final score. The top 8 skateboarders from the semifinals qualify for the finals, where the scores are reset and follow the same two 45 second round and five single trick round format.

== Results ==
=== Semifinals ===
Rank	Heat	Skateboarder	Nation	Run		Trick					Total
Rank	Heat	Skateboarder	Nation	1	2	1	2	3	4	5	Total
1	2	Coco Yoshizawa	Japan	83.59	~~71.75~~	86.65	88.68	~~78.19~~	~~0.00~~	~~0.00~~	258.92
2	4	Liz Akama	Japan	86.55	~~51.40~~	86.83	~~0.00~~	84.61	~~81.35~~	~~78.12~~	257.99
3	1	Cui Chenxi	China	~~80.62~~	82.01	~~81.18~~	83.11	~~0.00~~	89.22	~~0.00~~	254.34
4	1	Chloe Covell	Australia	~~68.14~~	78.89	82.26	~~0.00~~	~~0.00~~	85.58	~~0.00~~	246.73
5	4	Funa Nakayama	Japan	79.87	~~54.73~~	84.56	~~0.00~~	81.09	~~0.00~~	~~0.00~~	245.52
6	3	Paige Heyn	United States	71.65	~~35.37~~	85.66	~~0.00~~	86.98	~~0.00~~	~~0.00~~	244.29
7	3	Rayssa Leal	Brazil	59.88	~~35.62~~	~~85.87~~	88.87	92.68	~~0.00~~	~~0.00~~	241.43
8	4	Poe Pinson	United States	~~39.30~~	71.25	~~0.00~~	~~0.00~~	~~0.00~~	81.80	88.07	241.12
9	2	Zhu Yuanling	China	~~59.35~~	60.11	~~0.00~~	~~0.00~~	86.88	~~0.00~~	87.83	234.82
10	2	Roos Zwetsloot	Netherlands	~~49.5~~	71.6	83.61	~~0.00~~	~~0.00~~	~~0.00~~	78.50	233.71
11	3	Lucie Schoonheere	France	~~24.22~~	76.81	78.19	73.05	~~0.00~~	~~0.00~~	~~0.00~~	228.05
12	1	Zeng Wenhui	China	55.85	~~12.66~~	~~0.00~~	~~0.00~~	83.76	~~0.00~~	83.88	223.49
13	2	Daniela Terol	Spain	~~63.72~~	70.12	76.39	~~0.00~~	~~0.00~~	73.87	~~0.00~~	220.38
14	1	Natalia Munoz	Spain	~~48.83~~	57.44	74.25	83.01	~~68.12~~	~~0.00~~	~~0.00~~	214.70
15	3	Keet Oldenbeuving	Netherlands	64.61	~~48.40~~	~~0.00~~	72.69	73.48	~~0.00~~	~~0.00~~	210.78
16	2	Pâmela Rosa	Brazil	~~11.52~~	41.48	~~0.00~~	~~0.00~~	80.10	~~0.00~~	83.65	205.23
17	4	Vareeraya Sukasem	Thailand	48.52	~~45.07~~	~~0.00~~	74.04	78.19	~~0.00~~	~~0.00~~	200.75
18	1	Boipelo Awuah	South Africa	~~19.56~~	31.82	~~0.00~~	61.15	~~51.78~~	66.37	0.00	159.34
19	2	Gabi Mazetto	Brazil	~~21.07~~	61.17	0.00	~~0.00~~	~~TNS~~	83.18	~~0.00~~	144.35
20	3	Haylie Powell	Australia	62.19	~~41.07~~	0.00	~~0.00~~	~~0.00~~	63.11	~~0.00~~	125.30
21	1	Liv Lovelace	Australia	40.38	~~23.00~~	77.72	0.00	~~0.00~~	~~0.00~~	~~0.00~~	118.10
22	4	Mariah Duran	United States	~~12.13~~	58.36	0.00	0.00	~~0.00~~	~~0.00~~	~~0.00~~	58.36

=== Final ===
Rank	Skateboarder	Nation	Run		Trick					Total
Rank	Skateboarder	Nation	1	2	1	2	3	4	5	Total
1st place, gold medalist(s)	Coco Yoshizawa	Japan	~~85.02~~	86.80	~~0.00~~	~~86.34~~	~~0.00~~	96.49	89.46	272.75
2nd place, silver medalist(s)	Liz Akama	Japan	~~13.28~~	89.26	92.62	84.07	~~0.00~~	~~0.00~~	~~0.00~~	265.95
3rd place, bronze medalist(s)	Rayssa Leal	Brazil	71.66	~~34.80~~	~~0.00~~	92.88	~~0.00~~	~~0.00~~	88.83	253.37
4	Cui Chenxi	China	65.47	~~65.04~~	86.98	89.11	~~0.00~~	~~0.00~~	~~0.00~~	241.56
5	Poe Pinson	United States	~~36.75~~	50.18	83.73	~~0.00~~	88.43	~~0.00~~	~~0.00~~	222.34
6	Paige Heyn	United States	~~39.88~~	76.41	0.00	86.82	~~0.00~~	~~0.00~~	~~0.00~~	163.23
7	Funa Nakayama	Japan	~~48.14~~	79.77	0.00	0.00	~~0.00~~	~~0.00~~	~~0.00~~	79.77
8	Chloe Covell	Australia	70.33	~~45.46~~	0.00	0.00	~~TNS~~	~~0.00~~	~~0.00~~	70.33
