= Hayley Wilson =

Australian skateboarder (born 2001)

Personal information
- Born: 29 October 2001 (age 24) Mansfield, Victoria, Australia
- Occupation: Skateboarder

Sport
- Country: Australia
- Sport: Skateboarding
- Position: Goofy footed
- Rank: 9th (June 2020)
- Event: Street

Hayley Wilson (born 29 October 2001) is a goofy-footed Australian skateboarder from Mansfield, Victoria, Australia.

== Skateboarding career ==
Wilson is currently the Australian Skateboarding League's national champion, holding the title for four consecutive years, 2016–2019.

Wilson competed in the 2019 Street League Skateboarding Championship - London, placing second with a score of 26.2, finishing above Alexis Sablone, Letícia Bufoni, Rayssa Leal, and other skaters but behind Brazilian Pamela Rosa.

In July 2021, Wilson was named as part of Australia's inaugural Olympic skateboarding team to compete at the 2020 Summer Olympics in Tokyo. In the preliminary round, she tied French skater Charlotte Hym with a total score of 5.34, but was awarded sole possession of sixteenth place via the tie-breaking protocol by virtue of her higher best run score. Hym was placed seventeenth in the final rankings. Full details are in Skateboarding at the 2020 Summer Olympics – Women's street.
