= Skateboarding at the 2026 Asian Games – Women's street =

Women's street at the 2026 Asian Games
- Venue: Aichi International Exhibition Center
- Date: 26–27 September 2026
- Competitors: 12 from 7 nations

Medalists
gold medal	Zhu Yuanling	China
silver medal	Yumeka Oda	Japan
bronze medal	Cui Chenxi	China

The women's street competition at the 2026 Asian Games took place on 26 and 27 September 2026 at the Aichi Sky Expo Hall B in Tokoname, Aichi.

China's 15-year-old Zhu Yuanling won the gold medal with a total of 166.57 points, ahead of Japan's Yumeka Oda (161.96) and the defending champion Cui Chenxi (156.60).

== Schedule ==
All times are Japan Standard Time (UTC+09:00)

Date	Time	Event
Saturday, 26 September 2026	11:00	Prelims
Sunday, 27 September 2026	11:00	Final

== Results ==
Legend

- DNS — Did not start

=== Prelims ===
Rank	Athlete	Run		Trick			Total
Rank	Athlete	1	2	1	2	3	Total
1	Yumeka Oda (JPN)	~~53.44~~	71.38	80.47	~~72.94~~	~~53.22~~	151.85
2	Ibuki Matsumoto (JPN)	74.18	~~61.89~~	69.99	~~0.00~~	~~56.11~~	144.17
3	Cui Chenxi (CHN)	~~39.52~~	55.99	75.43	~~0.00~~	~~0.00~~	131.42
4	Shin Ji-yul (KOR)	~~35.48~~	49.21	~~75.77~~	80.67	~~0.00~~	129.88
5	Zhu Yuanling (CHN)	50.88	~~33.55~~	77.15	~~0.00~~	~~0.00~~	128.03
6	Park Ji-been (KOR)	~~48.81~~	49.47	~~65.19~~	70.44	~~0.00~~	119.91
7	Vareeraya Sukasem (THA)	~~51.41~~	53.30	~~0.00~~	~~0.00~~	56.77	110.07
8	Ni Wayan Malana Fairbrother (INA)	~~36.46~~	37.51	~~0.00~~	64.10	~~0.00~~	101.61
9	Zeefara Mahika Darmawan (INA)	~~5.55~~	23.35	~~0.00~~	~~0.00~~	60.08	83.43
10	Nathtiyabhorn Nawakitwong (THA)	~~19.45~~	25.14	57.21	~~0.00~~	~~0.00~~	82.35
11	Anna Lyu-Si-Gun (KAZ)	18.33	~~4.01~~	0.00	~~0.00~~	~~0.00~~	18.33
—	Yuna Wan (HKG)						DNS

=== Final ===
Rank	Athlete	Run			Trick			Total
Rank	Athlete	1	2	3	1	2	3	Total
1st place, gold medalist(s)	Zhu Yuanling (CHN)	~~74.56~~	~~66.96~~	79.73	~~78.96~~	86.84	~~0.00~~	166.57
2nd place, silver medalist(s)	Yumeka Oda (JPN)	~~13.72~~	~~18.99~~	71.21	90.75	~~73.11~~	~~0.00~~	161.96
3rd place, bronze medalist(s)	Cui Chenxi (CHN)	~~57.47~~	~~17.52~~	70.94	85.66	~~0.00~~	~~0.00~~	156.60
4	Shin Ji-yul (KOR)	~~45.40~~	67.51	~~17.14~~	~~0.00~~	85.78	~~0.00~~	153.29
5	Ibuki Matsumoto (JPN)	~~75.08~~	79.03	~~10.31~~	70.08	~~0.00~~	~~0.00~~	149.11
6	Ni Wayan Malana Fairbrother (INA)	~~8.04~~	~~51.55~~	61.28	~~0.00~~	75.69	~~0.00~~	136.97
7	Vareeraya Sukasem (THA)	23.24	~~9.53~~	~~7.53~~	~~0.00~~	~~71.14~~	79.61	102.85
8	Park Ji-been (KOR)	~~35.07~~	~~8.87~~	58.47	0.00	~~0.00~~	~~0.00~~	58.47
