= Miyu Ito =

Japanese skateboarder (born 2007)

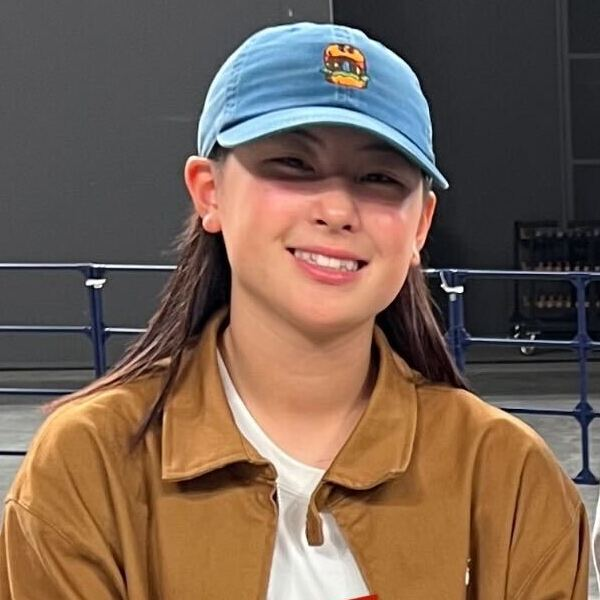

Personal information
- Born: 15 May 2007 (age 19)

Sport
- Country: Japan
- Sport: Skateboarding
- Position: Regular-footed
- Event: Street
Medal record
Women's street skateboarding
Representing Japan
World Championships
Bronze medal – third place	2024 Rome	Street
Asian Games
Bronze medal – third place	2022 Hangzhou	Street
X Games
Gold medal – first place	2024 Ventura	Street
Gold medal – first place	2026 Sacramento	Street
Gold medal – first place	2026 Sacramento	Street best trick
Silver medal – second place	2024 Ventura	Street best trick
Silver medal – second place	2024 Chiba	Street
Silver medal – second place	2025 Osaka	Street

Miyu Ito (伊藤美優, Itō Miyū; born 15 May 2007), also spelled Miyuu, is a Japanese skateboarder. She is a World Skateboarding Championship and Asian Games bronze medalist.

== Early life ==
Ito was born in Kaminoyama, Yamagata, Japan on 15 May 2007. She started snowboarding as a second grade elementary student, and was given a skateboard to practice in the off-season when she was in the third grade.

Ito's debut tournament was in the Japan Championship when she was a fourth grade student.

== Career ==
Ito won her first national championship at age 15 in November 2022, having placed third the year before. She beat 2020 Summer Olympics gold medalist, Momiji Nishiya, to take the championship. Earlier that year, she had placed second in the Japan Open event.

In September 2023, she competed at the 2022 Asian Games and won a bronze medal in the street event with a score of 221.59.

Ito made her X Games debut in Ventura, California in June 2024, and became the first rookie in history to win a gold medal in the women's skateboard street event. In September 2024, she competed at the World Skateboarding Championship. During the open qualifier round she had the second-highest score of 70.85 points. During the finals she won a bronze medal with a score of 249.53. In October 2024, weeks after her World Championships bronze medal, she again competed at the X Games in Chiba, Japan and won a silver medal in the street event.

Following the 2024 Olympic Qualifier Series, Ito was ranked in the top-ten of the world street skateboarding rankings, however, Japan already met its quota of three skaters, and as a result she didn't qualify for the 2024 Summer Olympics.

In June 2025, she once again won silver in the street event at the Osaka X Games. In June 2026, she competed at the first MoonPay X Games League (XGL) event in Sacramento, California and won a gold medal in the street event. She also won a gold medal in the best trick competition, winning with a frontside bluntslide shuv-it out of the 12-stair handrail, for her third career X Games gold medal.
