= Rayssa Leal =

Brazilian skateboarder (born 2008)

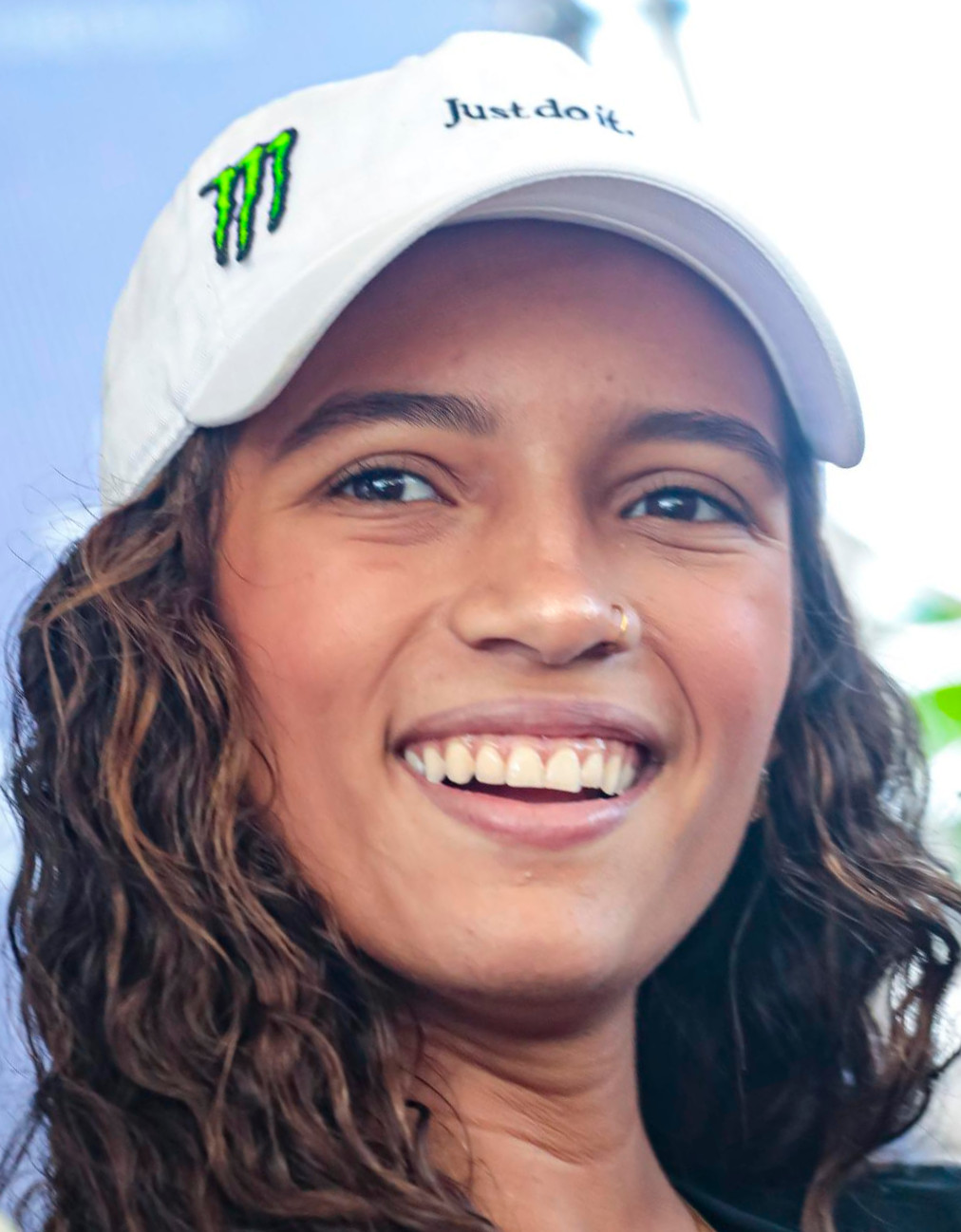
- Leal in 2025

Personal information
- Nickname: Fadinha ('Little Fairy')
- Born: Jhulia Rayssa Mendes Leal; 4 January 2008 (age 18) Imperatriz, Maranhão, Brazil
- Height: 1.60 m (5 ft 3 in)

Sport
- Country: Brazil
- Sport: Skateboarding
- Position: Goofy-footed
- Rank: 1st – Street (December 2024)
Medal record
Women's street skateboarding
Representing Brazil
Olympic Games
Silver medal – second place	2020 Tokyo	Street
Bronze medal – third place	2024 Paris	Street
World Championships
Gold medal – first place	2022 Sharjah	Street
Silver medal – second place	2023 Tokyo	Street
Bronze medal – third place	2021 Rome	Street
World Skate Games (Note: Both World Championships and World Skate Games represent skateboarding world titles by the World Skate (WS).)
Gold medal – first place	2024 Rome	Street
Street League Skateboarding (SLS)
Gold medal – first place	2022 Rio de Janeiro (F)	Street
Gold medal – first place	2023 São Paulo (F)	Street
Gold medal – first place	2024 São Paulo (F)	Street
Gold medal – first place	2025 São Paulo (F)	Street
Silver medal – second place	2019 São Paulo (F)	Street
Silver medal – second place	2021 Jacksonville (F)	Street
Pan American Games
Gold medal – first place	2023 Santiago	Street
X Games
Gold medal – first place	2022 Chiba	Street
Gold medal – first place	2023 Chiba	Street

Jhulia Rayssa Mendes Leal (born 4 January 2008) is a Brazilian profesional skateboarder. Representing Brazil in the street skateboarding, she won a silver medal at the 2020 Summer Olympics, as well as a bronze at the 2024 Games.

Leal is a two-time gold medalist at the World Skateboarding Championship in women's street. She is also the most successful female skateboarder at the Street League Skateboarding (SLS), with a record of four titles at the league's final season tournament (Super Crown).

== Early life ==
Leal was born in Imperatriz, the second largest city in Maranhão, Brazil, to parents Haraldo Oliveira Leal and Lilian Mendes. She has a younger brother, Arthur. She started skateboarding at the age of six, after getting her first skateboard as a gift from a family friend.

== Skateboarding career ==
Leal first gained attention at the age of 7, when a video of her skating in a tutu and jumping off tall structures on her skateboard went viral online. Leal's mother filmed the video on September 7, 2015, and sent it to American professional skateboarder Tony Hawk. The next day, Hawk reposted on Twitter and commented: "I don't know anything about it, but it's amazing: a fairytale-style heelflip in Brazil". At that time, she always made a post with the best maneuver of the day. She was dubbed "A Fadinha do Skate", translated roughly as "The Little Fairy of Skateboarding".

=== Early competitions ===
At age 11, Leal competed in the 2019 Street League Skateboarding Championship in London, placing third with a score of 26.0, finishing above Alexis Sablone, Letícia Bufoni, and other skaters but behind fellow Brazilian Pamela Rosa and Australia's Hayley Wilson. In July 2019, she placed first at the Street League Skateboarding Championship in Los Angeles, leading the podium ahead of Pamela Rosa and Alana Smith. Also in 2019, she won a fourth place for her first X Games appearance.

=== 2020: Debut at the Summer Olympics ===
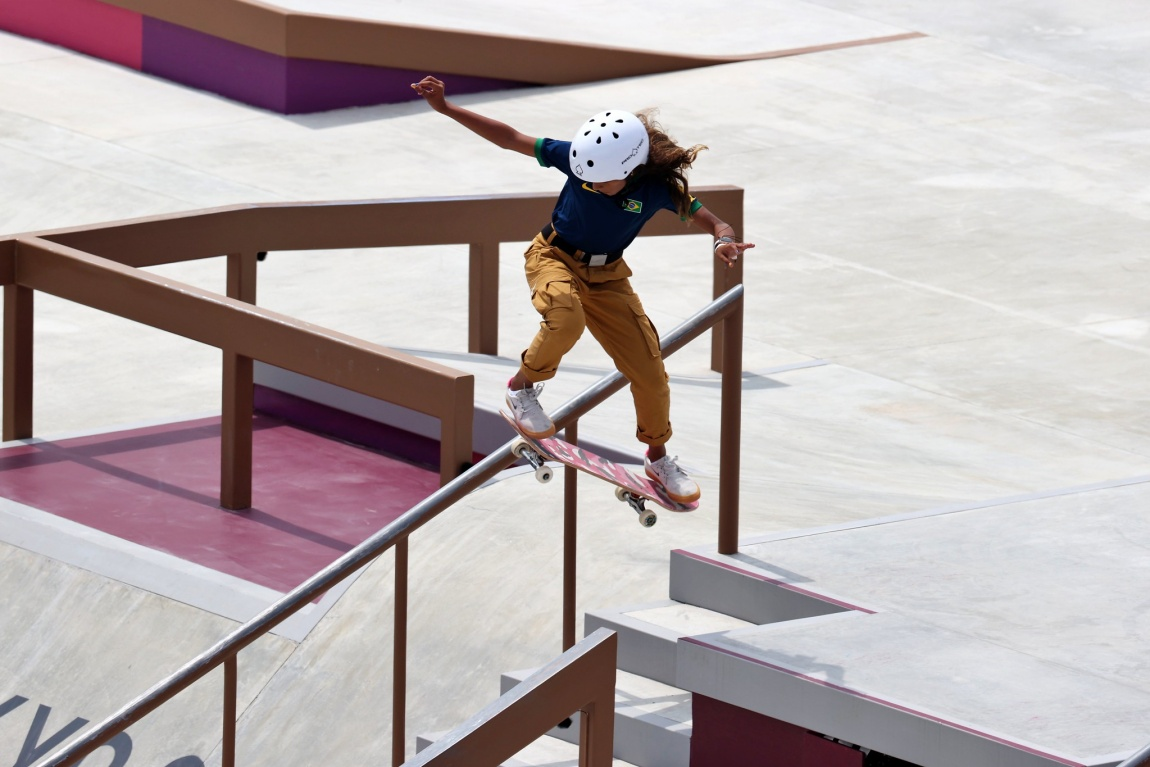
Leal during the skate street race at the 2020 Summer Olympics

In 2021, Leal competed in the pandemic-delayed 2020 Summer Olympics in Tokyo at the age of 13, the youngest Brazilian ever to participate in the Olympic Games. In the skateboarding street competition she placed 3rd in the qualifiers. In the final, she won the silver medal. At 13 years and 203 days old on medal day, she was the youngest Olympic medalist in 85 years, and became an instant celebrity, gaining 5.8 million new followers on Instagram. The young athlete also won The Visa Awards following her display of sportsmanship towards her opponents during the competition. The prize is a $50,000 donation to a charity of her choice.

=== 2021–24 ===
In August 2021, Leal won the opening leg of the 2021 Street League Skateboarding season, which took place in Salt Lake City, Utah, United States. In the last round of tricks, Leal needed an 8.3 rating to pass Funa Nakayama and managed to get an 8.5 rating. It was, at that time, the highest score in women's SLS history, as no woman had done a kickflip followed by a handrail maneuver until this point in an official competition.

In April 2022, she won her first X Games gold medal, defeating Nakayama and Chloe Covell.

In November 2022, Leal won the 2022 SLS Super Crown in Rio de Janeiro.

In December 2023, she won again the 2023 SLS Super Crown in São Paulo. In the final, she got a 9 rating for the first time in her career. This achievement also made her the first woman to get a 9 rating during the run section in an SLS competition.

=== 2024: Second Olympics apparition ===
In July 2024, Leal won a third place at the Olympic Games in Paris, becoming the youngest ever Brazilian double Olympic medallist.

=== 2025: Fourth Super Crown title ===
In December 2025, Leal won the 2025 SLS Super Crown in São Paulo, her fourth consecutive final season trophy at SLS.

== Personal life ==
Leal goes to psychotherapy and receives follow-up from family members and the businesswoman to direct her in her career. In June 2026, Leal made public her bisexuality after being revealed to be a relationship with Duda Wilken.

== Media appearances ==
Leal is set to appear as one of the new playable skaters in the 2025 video game Tony Hawk's Pro Skater 3 + 4, a remake of the third and fourth entries in the series.
