= Alexis Sablone =

American skateboarder and artist

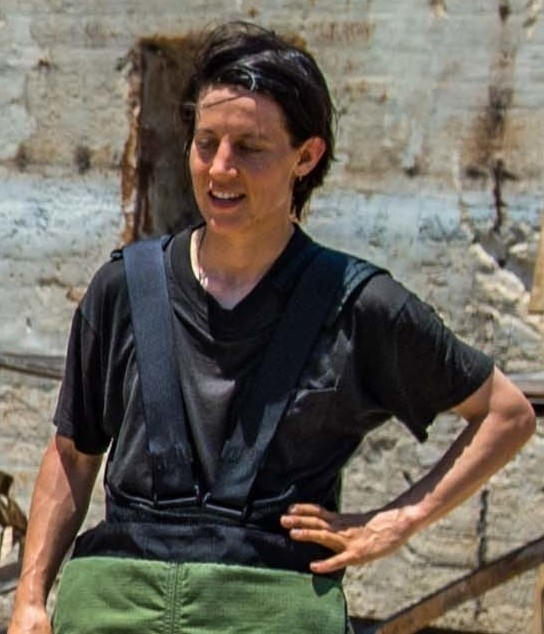
- Sablone in 2017

Personal information
- Born: August 12, 1986 (age 39) Old Saybrook, Connecticut, U.S.
- Education: Barnard College, MIT
- Occupations: Skateboarder; artist

Sport
- Country: United States
- Sport: Skateboarding
- Position: Goofy-footed
- Rank: 12th (June 2021)
- Event: Street
- Pro tour(s): Dew Tour; Street League Skateboarding
- Turned pro: 2018

Achievements and titles
- Olympic finals: 4th (2020)
Medal record
Women's street skateboarding
Representing the United States
World Championships
Bronze medal – third place	2016 Los Angeles	Street
X Games
Gold medal – first place	2015 Austin
Gold medal – first place	2012 Los Angeles
Gold medal – first place	2010 Los Angeles
Silver medal – second place	2011 Los Angeles
Silver medal – second place	2009 Los Angeles
Bronze medal – third place	2018 Minneapolis

Alexis Sablone (born August 12, 1986) is a goofy-footed American professional skateboarder, who ranked 12th in the world as of July 2021. She has competed in every X Games competition since 2009, the World Skateboarding Championship, and skated on the Dew Tour. Sablone competed in the 2020 Summer Olympics in Tokyo, placing 4th in the women's street final. In addition to being a professional skateboarder, Sablone has a master's degree in architecture from MIT. She currently resides in Crown Heights, Brooklyn.

== Biography ==
=== Early life ===
Alexis Sablone was born on August 12, 1986, and grew up in Old Saybrook, Connecticut. When she was nine years old Sablone began teaching herself how to skate in her mom's garage by watching old VHS tapes and mimicking what she saw. She attended The Country School in nearby Madison, Connecticut, where she met other skateboarders. As she told ESPN in a 2011 interview:

"I would just skate alone every night in the garage and on my porch. In fifth grade, I changed schools and there were a few skaters there [in Madison, Conn.]. We would all bring our skateboards to school – I don't really know what we did with them, though, because we didn't skate at school! But that was the first contact I had with other skaters... The closest skate park to my parents' house was in Guilford, and that was like 40 minutes away. I tried to go there every weekend. But during the week it was just me."

=== Early skateboarding career ===
Sablone entered her first contest when she was 12 years old, an all-girls skate jam in Rhode Island, where she earned second place. The next year she entered into another skate contest in New Jersey, which she won. While skating at Eastern Pulse Skatepark in Milford, Connecticut she happened to meet Kris Markovich who worked for Element at the time, the company flew her out to Huntington Beach, California for a skate competition where she rolled her ankle and decided she would never enter a contest ever again.

Sablone then attended Woodward Camp, a summer camp in Pennsylvania world-renowned for its action sports, gymnastics, and cheer programming. She then began traveling to Boston to skate on weekends, but it wasn't until 2002, with the release of PJ Ladd's Wonderful, Horrible, Life, that 16-year-old Sablone gained recognition, "Her segment, just a couple of minutes of her soaring off railings and curbs to Rosemary Clooney’s 'Mambo Italiano,' made her a star in the skateboarding world... 'She was doing tricks that weren’t just great because she was a girl; they were better than anything anyone else was doing,'"

However, after trying to get an agent and being told there was no market for women in skateboarding Sablone decided to pursue other interests. After graduating from Hopkins School in 2004 she attended Barnard College in New York City, graduating with a degree in architecture in 2008.

=== Return to skateboarding ===
While working as a waitress on the Upper East Side, Sablone's friend encouraged her to enter the Maloof Money Cup, which offered a $25,000 prize, she entered at the last minute and finished sixth. The same year, at 23, Sablone entered her first X Games, placing 2nd in Skateboard Street at X Games XV. As Sablone stated, "By 2009, the whole ankle injury thing was finally history and I was past the whole no-contest mindset. I'm not going to say it was all luck, but I do feel very lucky to have done well in my first two X Games." Sablone has competed in every X Games since, earning: three gold medals, two silver medals, and two bronze medals. Sablone also began competing in the Dew Tour, including the 2010 International Skateboarding Federation (ISF) Skate Park Finals where she placed third.

By 2012 Sablone's earnings from competitions allowed her to enroll in MIT's master's of architecture program. She graduated from the program in 2016, and is planning on turning her thesis, "Nuclear Oasis: The Story of 10,000-year-old Trash" into a graphic novel. While enrolled in graduate school Sablone also won the 2015 World Skateboarding Championship for women's street, sharing the largest prize purse in competitive skateboarding with Nyjah Huston and Jimmy Wilkins.

=== Professional career ===
Sablone received her first signature pro deck in 2017 as the first female member of the WKND Skateboards team. She also created graphics for the "Sir Palmer" video released by WKND in 2018 and illustrated some of board graphics for the company.

In 2018, she was invited to design a skate-able sculpture for a public square in Malmö, Sweden. "'Lady In The Square' is an artistic interpretation of a woman’s face from an aerial view, but up close it forms a grouping of skate obstacles set on top of a three-stair square. This project is an example of a perfect incorporation of skateboarding and fine art into public space."

In June 2019, Sablone collaborated with Converse to release her first pro model sneakers: white suede low-top One Star Pros with an ochre star. Vogue explained the significance of Sablone's accomplishment in May 2019 article: "Beyond being a symbol of athletic achievement, pro model merchandise offers female skaters an important opportunity to monetize their success. It was only last year that Sablone and her peers were able to make a living wage off of their sport."

Sablone placed second in the women's street event at the USA Skateboarding National Championships in October 2019. On the international circuit in 2019, she placed seventh at the World Skate SLS World Championship in September and repeated the performance for seventh place in the World Skate Oi STU Open Women's Street finals in November. Sablone parted ways with WKND in early 2020, and in November 2020 announced she had joined Alltimers Skateboards.

In early June 2021 Sablone released another collaboration with Converse, "an all-white quilted, high-top take on the classic Jack Purcell model with a tiny rainbow tab attached to the back. The company calls it her 'Pride' shoe." Sablone identifies as queer, "because the word is ambiguous and less-restricting than something like lesbian, which she dismisses as 'too gendered'"

In 2023, she released her third collaboration with Converse, the AS-1 Pro, a genderless sneaker inspired by retro designs of the 1980s and 1990s.

On January 15, 2026 the Skateboarding Hall of Fame announced Sablone will be included as a 2026 inductee.

== Tokyo Olympics ==
After the June 2021 Street World Championship in Rome, Italy Sablone was chosen for the inaugural USA Skateboarding National Team at the Tokyo Olympics.

In the Olympic street final, Sablone finished in fourth place with a score of 13.57 after a number of falls. Speaking to reporters after the competition she stated, "[P]art of it just feels like another contest. Like, I've been here, I've seen these people — we've skated together before, and then there's that part of my brain, like going crazy, thinking like 'This is history, this is the first Olympics.' I can't believe I'm here. ... It feels historic, everything just kind of feels like the stakes are higher and I can't really believe I'm here."

The 34-year-old Sablone also noted that she lost to much younger competitors, including 13 year olds Momiji Nishiya and Rayssa Leal, and 18 year old Funa Nakayama. "For a long time, there were way fewer females doing this. It's taken until now to get enough people to pay attention, to get enough eyes on it, to inspire girls around the world to start skating... I was like, ‘We’re finally here... Female skateboarders have reached critical mass. There’s enough now that there will be prodigies. And they’re here.'"
