= Yin Ts'ang =

Yin Ts’ang (隐藏, 隱藏 yǐn cáng [in˨˩˦tsʰɑŋ˧˥]; meaning "hidden" in English, formed in 2001) is a highly influential, multi-national Chinese hip-hop group from Beijing, China that originally consisted of MC Webber (PRC), 老郑XIV (USA), Sbazzo (CAN) and Dirty Heff (USA). They are frequently referred to as the originators of the modern mainland Chinese hip-hop movement and are recognized for releasing the first Chinese hip-hop album that has met with any critical acclaim.

Over the years Yin Ts’ang has done commercial collaborations with Nike, Adidas, the Chinese Basketball Association (CBA), Myspace, Casio and Philips. They have toured China, performing in 100 person performance houses in the Xinjiang Autonomous Region and 30,000 person capacity stadiums at the base of Wu-Tang Mountain. They have not only had the pleasure of working with Chinese artists like Supergirl Chris Lee (李宇春) and rock legend Cui Jian (崔健) but have also graced the stage with foreign legends like DJ Q-Bert, Kid Koala, Onyx and Mobb Deep. Yin Ts’ang has won back to back achievement awards at the 1st and 2nd Annual Chinese Hip-Hop Awards for Best Group and Most Dedicated to the Art and was awarded Best Rap Group in China at the 2009 Kappa-YoHo Pop Music awards.

== Origins and development ==
Yin Ts’ang was founded late in the year 2000 in Beijing, China by local b-boy 王波, Wáng Bō (MC Webber), and Jeremy Michael Johnston (老郑XIV), a DJ and producer originally from Montgomery, Alabama. They were joined in 2001 by Josh Heffernan (Dirty Heff), an intellectual lyricist from Chicago, Illinois, and Marcus Zhong (Sbazzo), a rapper and producer from Toronto, Canada. The four members immediately clicked and began making music together in a small apartment in Beijing. In 2002, after having recorded more than 50 demo tracks, the group signed with local record label Scream Records and went directly to the studio to begin recording. Soon after they released their first full-length studio album in Mandarin Chinese, which was co-produced and engineered by Mel "Herbie" Kent. The lead single off Serve the People, “Welcome to Beijing” an upbeat commercial anthem about Beijing which contained a catchy loop played on the local Erhu fiddle, reached a #11 spot nationally and secured the group a nomination for Best New Rock-Rap Group at the Pepsi Music Awards and the award for Best New Group of 2003 at the China National Radio Music Awards. The album also contains arguably the first Mandarin Jungle genre track "Speak" (DJ Herbie UK Remix) which along with “Welcome to Beijing” has been featured on BBC Radio 1Xtra.

In 2005, fed up with the censorship and corruption within the music industry, Yin Ts’ang decided not to renew their contract with Scream Records and instead chose to release material independently via the internet, and at local venues and shops. To continue promoting local hip-hop the members of Yin ts’ang, along with the Beijing run Society Skateboards, began a monthly event called Section 6 which focused on promoting the pillars of hip-hop culture in numerous Beijing nightclubs. Section 6, still happening regularly, is now the longest running grassroots hip-hop party in Beijing.

Yin Ts’ang was reduced to a duo in 2006 when Heff returned to the US to pursue higher education and MC Webber left the group due to creative differences to later form the band “Beijing Hip-Hop Experience”. 老郑XIV and Sbazzo, released the group's 2nd studio album, Fast Lane, after the breakup in 2007 through Kirin Kid Productions. Due to a lack of budget and poor media promotion, the album met with limited success. After legal action and a disgruntled break up between the artists and label management Yin Ts’ang was released from their contract and once again returned to being independent free-agents.

2007 also saw the rise of the group's website, yintsang.com (a.k.a. shiftcn.com) which was run in part by 老郑XIV. The website and its local following was acquired by Sedgwick Media Group Asia in 2008, merged into their international online hip-hop community which included www.hiphop.ch and www.sixshot.com and renamed www.hiphop.cn with headquarters located in Shanghai. The Chinese website was first downsized in 2008 and then later closed along with all their other portals after declaring bankruptcy in 2009.

In 2009 老郑XIV along with Swiss-Chinese Battle Rapper and longtime collaborator Young Kin (born Andreas Yi-Jun Hwang) and China National Radio DJ, Lone Tian founded the label Yin Entertainment which was aimed at promoting local and international hip-hop acts in China.

== Group members ==
- Sbazzo (born Marcus Zhong)
- 老郑XIV (born Jeremy Michael Johnston)
- MC Webber (born 王波)
- Dirty Heff (born Joshua Heffernan)
