= Ibuki Matsumoto =

Japanese skateboarder

Sport
- Country: Japan
- Sport: Skateboarding
- Event: Street
Medal record
Women's street skateboarding
Representing Japan
World Championships
Gold medal – first place	2025 São Paulo	Street
X Games
Silver medal – second place	2025 Salt Lake City	Street best trick
Bronze medal – third place	2025 Osaka	Street
Bronze medal – third place	2026 Chiba	Street
Bronze medal – third place	2026 Sacramento	Street best trick

Ibuki Matsumoto (松本伊吹, Matsumoto Ibuki) is a Japanese skateboarder. She is a World Skateboarding Championship gold medalist.

== Career ==
In November 2025, Matsumoto competed at the World Skateboarding Tour World Cup in Kitakyushu and won a gold medal with a total score of 160.51, finishing just over two-tenths of a point ahead of Yumeka Oda's score of 160.29. She competed at the 2025 World Skateboarding Championship, which were postponed until March 2026, and won a gold medal in the street event with a total score of 156.59.
