= Chinese hip-hop =

Chinese music genre

Chinese hip-hop (Chinese: 中国嘻哈; pinyin: Zhōngguó xīhā), also known as C-Rap, is a subgenre of Chinese music. Some of the earliest influences of hip-hop in came from films such as Beat Street (1984) which entered China on video tape via embassy workers or foreign businessmen and their families.

== History ==
The first DJ in China who played hip-hop music on a daily basis was a resident at the first Chinese nightclub Juliana's in Beijing in 1984. At the time there were no other clubs in mainland China but Juliana's, which was already receiving monthly deliveries of records from London featuring labels such as Sugarhill, Tommy Boy, and StreetSounds.

In 1992, China hosted its first regular hip-hop nights—held on Fridays and Saturdays—at the Kunlun Hotel’s Crystal Disco in Beijing.

Yin Ts'ang (隐藏) released a full-length album, Serve The People (为人民服务) (2002). The album was co-produced and written by British DJ Mel “Herbie” Kent, while being entirely recorded in his home studio. The group was featured in full-length articles in the Los Angeles Times, and The New York Times.

Adaptation of "Guests from Afar, Please Stay" (2001): Herbie collaborated with renowned Chinese composer Bian Liunian at the 2001 Beijing Summer Universiade closing ceremony with 73,000 people in attendance, performing an electronic-folk fusion featuring live turntable scratching and the erhu (the performance begins at the 2:15 mark on Bilibili). https://www.bilibili.com/video/BV1ho4y1373b/

Chinese DJ V-Nutz (Gary Wang) claimed, "[Chinese style is] young, local kids really enjoy Western things right now. Then maybe after 10 or 15 years, maybe they can have their own style."). Hip-hop is often performed in English and many believe Chinese is not suitable for the genre; "people said, straight up, you can't rap in Chinese, Chinese does not work for rap... Chinese is not suitable for rap music because it's tonal." XIV of the rap group Yin Ts'ang put it clearly, "I can tell you about what we don't rap about: gangbangin', pushin' drugs, or the government, that's a good way to not continue your career (or your life)."

Dana Burton, an American, started the Iron Mic competition, an annual rap battle which encouraged more free-styling and less karaoke-style performances, in 2001 (Foreign Policy, 2007). Burton recorded:

"The few rappers I met [initially] were rapping in English. I'd say, 'Let me hear you rap', and they'd just do a karaoke thing, repeating a few lines of Eminem or Naughty by Nature. As an American that was so odd for me; you can't say anyone else's rhymes, you just don't do that. But it's the culture here. They like karaoke and doing someone else's songs." (Foreign Policy, 2007).

One underground Chinese artist, Hu Xuan, recorded all of the tracks on his album in Kunminghua, the local dialect spoken in the area of Kunming. "One rapper spits out words in a distinctive Beijing accent, scolding the other for not speaking proper Mandarin. His opponent from Hong Kong snaps back to the beat in a trilingual torrent of Cantonese, English, and Mandarin, dissing the Beijing rapper for not representing the people."

Big Zoo became a popular Chinese hip-hop group, but in 2008, one of the crew members, Mow left the team, and rapper Free-T released his song "Diary of Life," signaling the return of Big Zoo.

There is an official annual Chinese Hip-Hop Awards Show (中国嘻哈颁奖典礼).

The 2017 show The Rap of China brought hip-hop to new levels of mainstream success, with billions of online views,

From 2016, the Chinese Communist Party began supporting hip-hop music as a new propaganda outlet. The Communist Youth League, a government-backed Communist youth movement, sponsored CD Rev, also known as Chengdu Revolution, a hip-hop group, released the song "This is China", in June 2016, and "No THAAD" in May 2017. Hip-hop groups have expressed their patriotism in rap songs. Media scholar Sheng Zou wrote, “the state-centric ideology is aesthetically evoked by co-opting popular cultural formats, maneuvering grassroots nationalistic expressions and appropriating symbols of both tradition and modernity. Hip-hop is thus localized and sanitized as a cultural medium of propaganda.”

== Overseas ==
Rappers of heritage in China have achieved renown success in the United States, the most recent is the Miami-born, NYs 106 and Park hall-of-famer Jin, who raps in both English and Cantonese.
