= Skateboarding at the 2020 Summer Olympics – Women's street =

Olympic skateboarding event

Women's street at the Games of the XXXII Olympiad
- Olympic skateboarding
- Venue: Ariake Urban Sports Park
- Dates: 26 July 2021
- Competitors: 20 from 13 nations
- Winning score: 15.26

Medalists
1st place, gold medalist(s)		Momiji Nishiya	Japan
2nd place, silver medalist(s)		Rayssa Leal	Brazil
3rd place, bronze medalist(s)		Funa Nakayama	Japan

The 2020 Summer Olympics women's street skateboarding competition occurred on 26 July 2021 at Ariake Urban Sports Park in Tokyo, Japan.

It was originally scheduled to be held in 2020, but on 24 March 2020, the Olympics were postponed to 2021 due to the COVID-19 pandemic.

Momiji Nishiya of Japan won the gold medal, with Rayssa Leal of Brazil and Funa Nakayama of the Japan winning the silver and bronze medals.

== Qualification ==
- 3 from the World Championships
- 16 from the World Olympic Rankings
- 1 host nation place

== Competition format ==
All 20 skateboarders did two 45-second runs, and then five single tricks rounds. Only the top 4 scores from the seven rounds for each skateboarder counted toward the final score. The top 8 skateboarders from the Semi-Final qualified for the finals, where the scores were reset and follow the same two 45 second round and five single trick round format.

== Results ==
=== Semifinals ===
The top 8 skateboarders of 20 advanced to the finals.

Rank	Heat	Skateboarder	Nation	Run		Trick					Total
Rank	Heat	Skateboarder	Nation	1	2	1	2	3	4	5	Total
1	3	Funa Nakayama	Japan	1.40	4.66	~~0.00~~	5.21	~~0.00~~	4.50	~~0.00~~	15.77
2	3	Momiji Nishiya	Japan	~~3.15~~	3.20	~~0.00~~	4.05	~~0.00~~	4.62	3.53	15.40
3	4	Rayssa Leal	Brazil	3.29	~~2.01~~	~~2.82~~	~~0.00~~	3.37	3.20	5.05	14.91
4	2	Roos Zwetsloot	Netherlands	~~1.00~~	3.71	2.80	~~2.53~~	2.93	4.04	~~0.00~~	13.48
5	2	Aori Nishimura	Japan	2.97	3.01	~~0.00~~	~~0.00~~	~~0.00~~	3.00	3.84	12.82
6	4	Zeng Wenhui	China	1.66	2.42	4.92	~~0.00~~	3.31	~~0.00~~	~~0.00~~	12.31
7	2	Margielyn Didal	Philippines	~~1.71~~	2.77	3.01	~~0.00~~	3.02	~~0.00~~	3.22	12.02
8	4	Alexis Sablone	United States	1.81	~~1.13~~	2.70	4.20	3.06	~~0.00~~	~~0.00~~	11.77
9	4	Leticia Bufoni	Brazil	~~2.21~~	2.58	2.62	~~2.20~~	2.81	~~0.00~~	2.90	10.91
10	3	Pamela Rosa	Brazil	1.25	3.57	2.82	~~0.00~~	~~0.00~~	~~0.00~~	2.42	10.06
11	4	Lore Bruggeman	Belgium	3.43	3.40	1.21	1.23	~~0.00~~	~~0.00~~	~~0.00~~	9.27
12	1	Keet Oldenbeuving	Netherlands	2.22	2.14	2.01	2.33	~~0.00~~	~~0.00~~	~~0.00~~	8.70
13	1	Mariah Duran	United States	1.52	1.42	0.00	~~0.00~~	~~0.00~~	~~0.00~~	5.01	7.95
14	1	Asia Lanzi	Italy	1.31	~~1.20~~	~~1.13~~	~~0.00~~	1.93	1.23	1.66	6.13
15	1	Andrea Benítez	Spain	1.94	1.81	~~0.00~~	~~0.40~~	~~0.00~~	0.70	1.51	5.96
16	2	Hayley Wilson	Australia	0.93	3.31	0.00	~~0.00~~	~~0.00~~	~~0.00~~	1.10	5.34
17	3	Charlotte Hym	France	1.31	~~1.00~~	1.82	~~0.00~~	~~0.00~~	1.01	1.20	5.34
18	2	Julia Brueckler	Austria	1.10	0.71	1.80	~~0.00~~	~~0.00~~	~~0.00~~	1.49	5.10
19	1	Annie Guglia	Canada	0.86	~~0.63~~	0.65	0.81	~~0.00~~	~~0.40~~	1.03	3.35
20	3	Alana Smith	United States	0.46	0.39	0.40	0.00	~~0.00~~	~~0.00~~	~~0.00~~	1.25

=== Final ===
Rank	Skateboarder	Nation	Run		Trick					Total
Rank	Skateboarder	Nation	1	2	1	2	3	4	5	Total
1st place, gold medalist(s)	Momiji Nishiya	Japan	3.02	~~2.91~~	~~0.00~~	~~0.00~~	4.15	4.66	3.43	15.26
2nd place, silver medalist(s)	Rayssa Leal	Brazil	~~2.94~~	3.13	~~0.00~~	3.91	4.21	3.39	~~0.00~~	14.64
3rd place, bronze medalist(s)	Funa Nakayama	Japan	2.62	2.67	~~0.00~~	5.00	~~0.00~~	4.20	~~0.00~~	14.49
4	Alexis Sablone	United States	2.52	2.01	4.03	~~0.00~~	5.01	~~0.00~~	~~0.00~~	13.57
5	Roos Zwetsloot	Netherlands	3.34	3.80	4.12	0.00	~~0.00~~	~~0.00~~	~~0.00~~	11.26
6	Zeng Wenhui	China	2.13	2.60	0.00	4.93	~~0.00~~	~~0.00~~	~~0.00~~	9.66
7	Margielyn Didal	Philippines	2.33	2.22	0.00	2.97	~~0.00~~	~~0.00~~	~~0.00~~	7.52
8	Aori Nishimura	Japan	0.46	3.46	0.00	3.00	~~0.00~~	~~0.00~~	~~0.00~~	6.92

== See also ==
- Skateboarding at the 2020 Summer Olympics
- Skateboarding at the 2020 Summer Olympics – Men's street
- Skateboarding at the 2020 Summer Olympics – Women's park
