= Yumeka Oda =

Japanese skateboarder (born 2006)

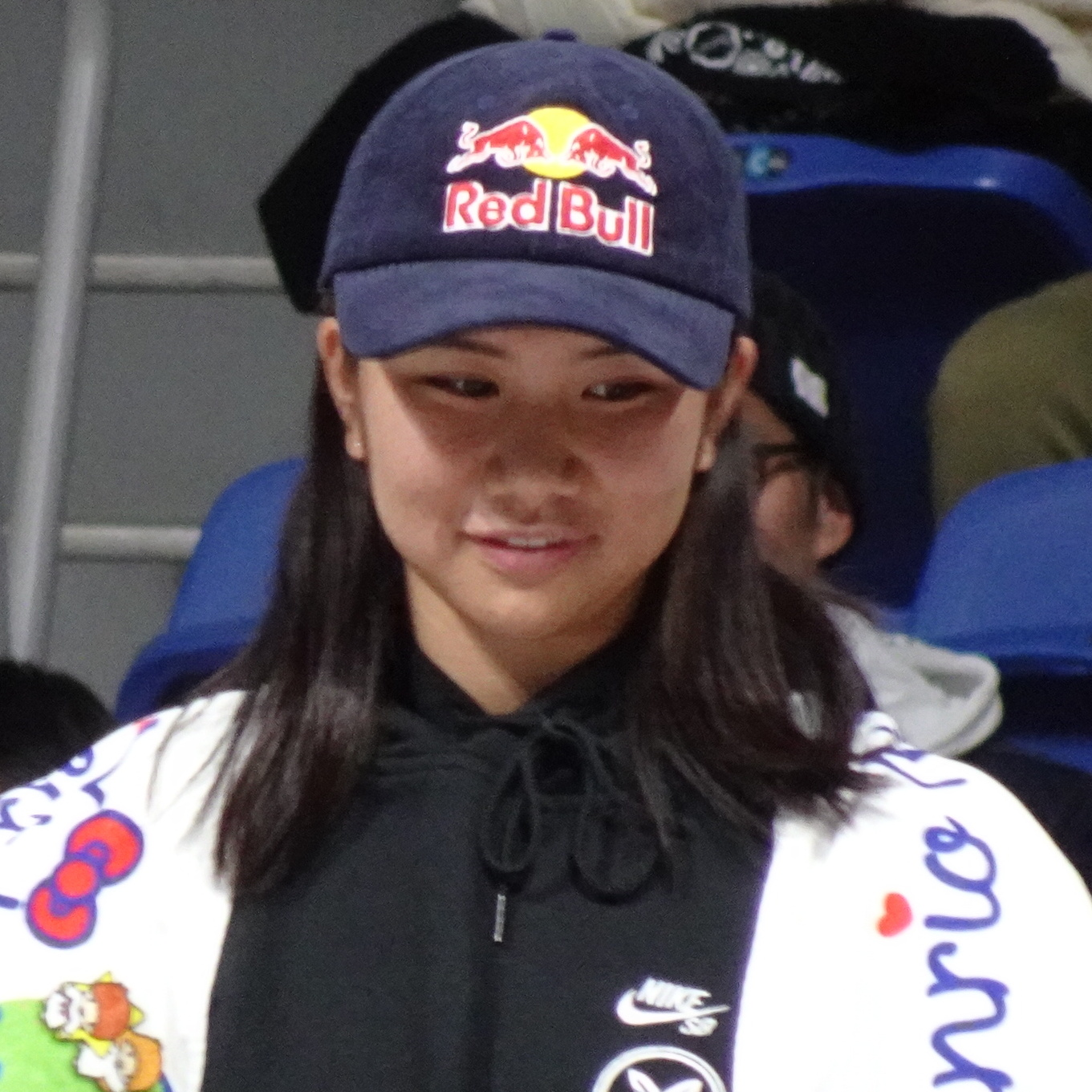
- Oda at the 2023 World Skateboarding Championship

Personal information
- Native name: 織田夢海
- Born: 30 October 2006 (age 20) Aichi Prefecture, Japan

Sport
- Country: Japan
- Sport: Skateboarding
- Position: Regular-footed
- Event: Street
Medal record
Women's street skateboarding
Representing Japan
World Championships
Gold medal – first place	2023 Sharjah	Street
World Skate Games
Gold medal – first place	2026 Asunción	Street
Asian Games
Silver medal – second place	2026 Aichi–Nagoya	Street
X Games
Gold medal – first place	2024 Ventura	Street Best Trick
Silver medal – second place	2025 Salt Lake City	Street
Bronze medal – third place	2025 Salt Lake City	Street Best Trick
Bronze medal – third place	2024 Ventura	Street
Bronze medal – third place	2022 California	Street

Yumeka Oda (織田 夢海, Oda Yumeka; born 30 October 2006) is a Japanese skateboarder, she was born in Aichi Prefecture, Japan.

== Career ==
At the age of seven, Oda started skateboarding as off-season training for snowboarding at the suggestion of her uncle. She is a "street" skater who performs on courses that mimic handrails and obstacles in the city.

On April 21, 2023, Oda signed an athlete contract with Sanrio along with Momiji Nishiya. She became the company's first athlete. In December of the same year, she won her first victory at the women's street event of the World Skateboarding Championship, which was held for the first time in Japan.
