= Zeng Wenhui =

Chinese street skateboarder (born 2005)

Personal information
- Native name: 曾文蕙
- Born: 8 February 2005 (age 21) Zhaoqing, Guangdong, China
- Occupation: Professional skateboarder

Sport
- Country: China
- Sport: Skateboarding
- Rank: 12th
- Event: Street
- Club: Guangdong Province
- Turned pro: 2018

Achievements and titles
- Olympic finals: 6th (2020)
Medal record
Asian Games
Silver medal – second place	2022 Hangzhou	Street

Zeng Wenhui (Chinese: 曾文蕙; pinyin: Zēng Wénhuì; born 8 February 2005) is a Chinese street skateboarder and two-time Chinese Champion. At the 2020 Summer Olympics, she finished sixth in the women's street skateboarding event, the first event of its kind to be included in an Olympic program.

== Career ==
Zeng was selected to train for skateboarding in 2017, around age twelve. Before taking up skateboarding, she had practiced kung fu from age six. She made her professional skateboarding debut in 2018 at the International Skateboarding Open (ISO) in Nanjing, where she placed thirteenth in the qualifiers of the women's street event. She placed fourth at the 2018 Asian Games and won the China National Skateboarding Championship in 2019 and 2020.

At the Tokyo 2020 Olympics, Zeng was one of twenty athletes who competed in the women's street skateboarding event. Zeng qualified for the event by virtue of ranking 21st in the World Skate Olympic World Skateboarding Rankings. In the semifinals, Zeng came in 6th place, advancing to the finals round, where she finished the competition in 6th place.

On 11 September 2021, at the 14th National Games in Shaanxi, China, Zeng won the women's street skateboarding competition with a score of 15.92. On 16 October 2022, at the Rio Open Skateboarding (Street), she won the eighth place in the women's event and on November 5, she attained fourth in the women's semi-finals of the Street League Skateboarding in Rio de Janeiro, Brazil and advanced to the finals. On November 6, she finished sixth in the finals. On 1 February 2023, at the 2022 World Skateboarding Championship in Sharjah, UAE, Zeng was eliminated in the 45th place at the women's street qualifying round and on February 12 in the same event, she attained 27th position in the women's street event and was eliminated in the qualifying round. In July 2023, she was selected into the Chinese skateboarding national team for the 19th Asian Games in Hangzhou, China. On September 15, at the 2023 World Skateboarding Street Professional Tour in Lausanne, Switzerland, she won ninth place in the street event. On September 27, at the 19th Asian Games, she won the silver medal in the women's skateboarding street finals at the 19th Asian Games with 236.61 points.

On 22 June 2024, at the 2024 Summer Olympics skateboarding qualification series in Budapest, Hungary, she achieved 15th place in the women's street skateboarding preliminaries and advanced to the semifinals, thereby ensuring her qualification for the 2024 Summer Olympics in Paris, France. At the women's street skateboarding event in the 2024 Summer Olympics on 28 July, Zeng attained twelfth position in the semi-finals with 223.49 points and did not advance to the finals.
