= Zhu Yuanling =

Chinese street skateboarder (born 2011)

Personal information
- Native name: 朱沅铃
- Born: 13 February 2011 (age 15) Xinxing Village, Muge Town, Guangning County, Zhaoqing, Guangdong, China
- Occupation: Professional skateboarder

Sport
- Country: China
- Sport: Skateboarding
- Rank: 13th
- Event: Street
Medal record
Women's street skateboarding
Representing China
Asian Games
Gold medal – first place	2026 Aichi–Nagoya	Street
Youth Olympic Games
Gold medal – first place	2026 Dakar	Street

Zhu Yuanling (Chinese: 朱沅铃; pinyin: Zhū Yuánlíng; born 13 February 2011) is a Chinese street skateboarder.

== Early life ==
Zhu was born in Guangning County in Zhaoqing, Guangdong. At the age of 7, she began training for trampolining and the age of 9, she entered training for skateboarding. In 2020, she participated in the Guangdong Youth Trampoline Championship and won the bronze medal in the women's double synchronized group C. On 27 January 2021, she successfully entered the national skateboarding (training) team for trial training. After a month of trial training, Zhu successfully remained in the team and entered a six-month training phase to become a professional skateboarder.

== Skateboarding career ==
On 21 August 2022, she won the women's skateboarding championship in the 16th Guangdong Provincial Games. In August 2023, at the 2022 National Roller Skating Championships, Zhu won third place in the women's street style with a score of 13.47. On 4 November, in the women's street skateboarding final of the 1st National Youth Games in Nanning, China, she won the runner-up with 164.33 points. On 19 November, at the 2023 National Skateboarding Championships in Suzhou, China, she won the women's street championship with 161.49 points.

On 13 December, she was eliminated in the quarter-finals of the 2023 Street Skateboarding World Championships Women's Street Skateboarding in Tokyo, Japan. On 17 May 2024, in the women's street skateboarding preliminaries of the 2024 Summer Olympics qualification series in Shanghai, Zhu attained a best score of 70.03 points in the preliminaries but on 18 May, she was eliminated in the quarter-finals. On June 22, in the women's street skateboarding preliminary round of the 2024 Summer Olympics qualification series in Budapest, Hungary, she attained sixth place and advanced to the semi-finals. On July 1, she was selected as one of the four skateboarders to represent the Chinese national skateboarding team for the 2024 Summer Olympics. At the women's street skateboarding event in the 2024 Summer Olympics on 28 July, Zhu attained ninth position in the semi-finals with 234.82 points and did not advance to the finals. At the women’s street at the 2026 Asian Games in Aichi, Japan, Zhu won the gold medal with 166.57 points.
