= Cui Chenxi =

Chinese street skateboarder (born 2009)

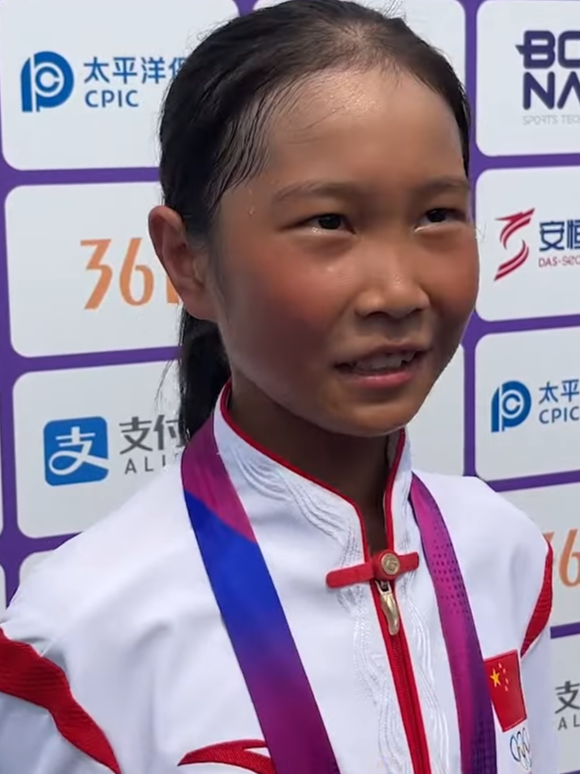
- Cui in 2023

Personal information
- Native name: 崔宸曦
- Born: 19 December 2009 (age 16) Jinan, Shandong, China
- Occupation: Professional skateboarder

Sport
- Sport: Skateboarding
- Position: Regular-footed
- Rank: 8th
- Event: Street
Medal record
Women's street skateboarding
Representing China
Asian Games
Gold medal – first place	2022 Hangzhou	Street
Bronze medal – third place	2026 Aichi–Nagoya	Street

Cui Chenxi (Chinese: 崔宸曦; pinyin: Cuī Chénxī; born 19 December 2009) is a Chinese street skateboarder. Aged 14 years and 223 days, she won the gold medal in the women's street skateboarding event at the 19th Asian Games held in Hangzhou, China, making her the youngest Chinese gold medalist in the Asian Games.

== Sports career ==
Cui began rollerblading at the age of three with the help of her father who was a roller skater. She took up skateboarding in 2020 due to restrictions in rollerblading during the COVID-19 pandemic in China.

On 24 April 2021, at the 2021 China Skateboarding Classic, Cui was the runner-up with 13.37 points. On 31 July 2022, she won the women's championship in the national finals of the 2022 Weibo Skateboarding Classic. In December 2022, she made her debut in the national competition for street skateboarding for the 2024 Summer Olympics and the 19th Asian Games national training team trials, and was ranked the top three in the women's street skateboarding event.

On 1 February 2023, Cui advanced to the top 32 of the women street qualifiers at the 2022 Skateboarding Street and Park World Championships in Sharjah, UAE. On June 26, at the 2023 World Skateboarding Street Professional Tour in Rome, Italy, she advanced to the quarterfinals. In July 2023, she was selected into the Chinese skateboarding national team for the 19th Asian Games in Hangzhou, China. On September 27, she won the gold medal in the women's skateboarding street finals at the 19th Asian Games with 242.62 points, becoming the youngest Chinese gold medalist in the Asian Games. At the WST Lausanne Street 2023 quarter-finals, she attained first position with a score of 51.32.

In December 2023, at the 2023 World Skateboarding Championship in Tokyo, Japan, she achieved eighth position. On 11 March 2024, at the Skateboarding Points Competition in Dubai, UAE for the 2024 Summer Olympics, Cui ranked seventh in the women's street event finals. On May 17, at the 2024 Summer Olympics qualification series in Shanghai, China, she was ranked fifth in the women's street skateboarding preliminaries and on May 19, in the finals of the qualification series in Shanghai, she achieved fifth place with a score of 247.44 points. On June 22, at the Olympic qualification series in Budapest, Hungary, she achieved tenth place in the women's street skateboarding preliminaries and advanced to the semifinals, thereby ensuring her qualification for the 2024 Summer Olympics. At the women's street skateboarding event in the 2024 Summer Olympics on 28 July, Cui attained third position in the semi-finals with 254.34 points and advanced to the finals. In the finals, she attained fourth position with a score of 241.56.

In June 2026, at the World Skateboarding World Cup in Rome, Italy, Cui won the bronze medal in the women's street final with a score of 152.78. At the women’s street at the 20th Asian Games in Aichi, Japan, she won the bronze medal with 156.60 points.
