= Charlotte Hym =

French skateboarder

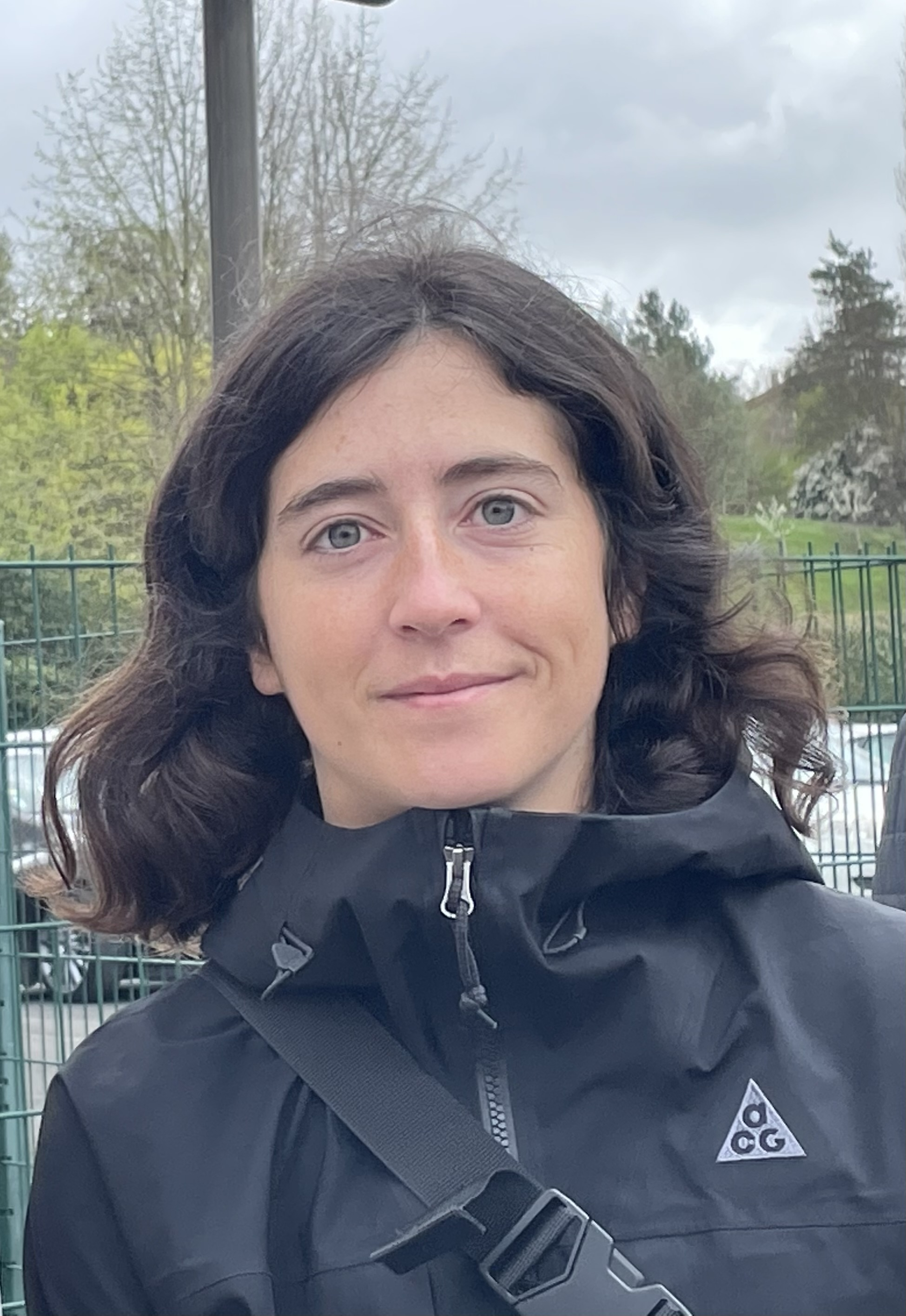

Personal information
- Born: 30 October 1992 (age 33) Paris, France
- Education: Paris Descartes University

Sport
- Country: France
- Sport: Skateboarding
- Position: Regular-footed
- Rank: 24
- Event: Street

Charlotte Hym (born 30 October 1992) is a French street skateboarder and neuroscientist based in Paris.

== Early life and education ==
Hym was born in Paris and grew up close to Boulevard Richard-Lenoir. She asked for a skateboard at the age of twelve because she saw so many people skateboarding in her local area.

Hym obtained a bachelor's degree in Sport sciences at the Paris Descartes University in 2013, and completed a master's degree in Neuroscience from the same university in 2015. She remained in neuroscience as a doctoral researcher, focusing on cognitive neuroscience at psychology in the laboratory of Marianne Barbu-Roth. She looked at the impact of maternal voices on newborn babies. In 2019, she received a PhD degree in Cognitive neuroscience and Psychology from the Paris Descartes University.

== Skateboarding career ==
Hym has competed at the World Skateboarding Championships. In 2016 she was approached by Commission Skateboard France to join the France skateboarding teams. She trained in Cosanostra Skatepark. In July 2021 she represented France in the Women's Street Skateboarding event at the 2020 Summer Olympics, finishing in 17th place.
