= Funa Nakayama =

Japanese skateboarder (born 2005)

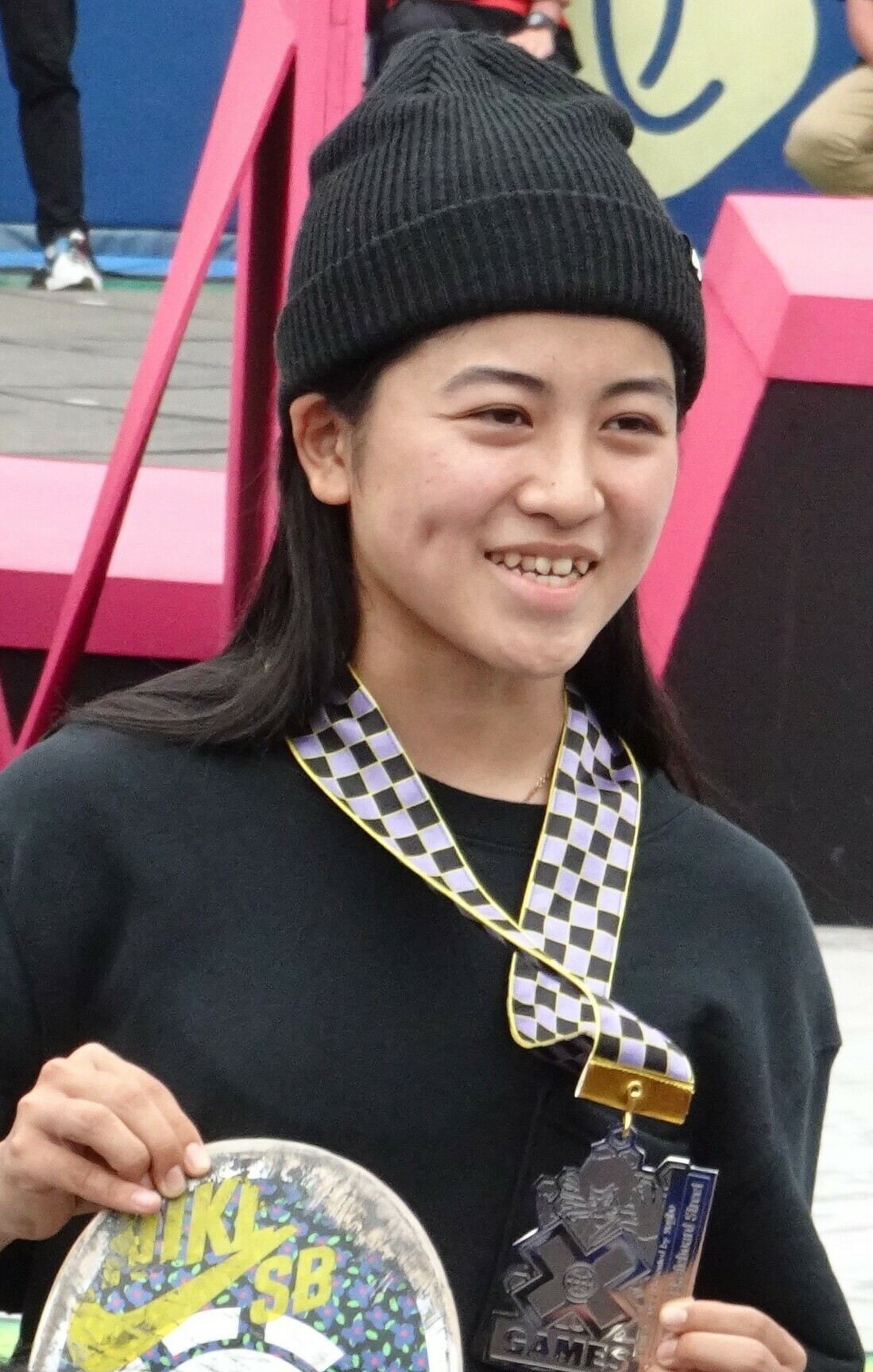
- Nakayama at X Games Chiba 2022

Personal information
- Born: June 17, 2005 (age 21) Toyama City, Japan

Sport
- Country: Japan
- Sport: Skateboarding
Medal record
Women's street skateboarding
Representing Japan
Olympic Games
Bronze medal – third place	2020 Tokyo	Street
World Championships
Silver medal – second place	2022 Rio de Janeiro	Street
X Games
Silver medal – second place	2022 Chiba	Street
Silver medal – second place	2026 Chiba	Street best trick

Funa Nakayama (中山 楓奈, Nakayama Fūna; born 17 June 2005) is a Japanese skateboarder from Toyama City. Nakayama won a bronze medal in the women's street competition at the 2020 Summer Olympics held in Tokyo, Japan. In January 2023, she became the first Asian woman to be featured on the cover of Thrasher.

== Skateboarding career ==
Nakayama competed in the 2018 Japan Skateboarding Championships at Murasaki Park Tokyo on May 13, 2018, in Tokyo, Japan. Nakayama competed in the finals at the Street League Skateboarding Tour - London in 2019. She finished in 6th place. She entered the finals as the number one qualifier. She had similar results three weeks later in Long Beach, California. She entered that contest off of a second place in the street qualifier. As of June 2019, she is ranked #8 in the world.

She is participating in the Dew Tour.
