= Vareeraya Sukasem =

Thai professional skateboarder

Personal information
- Native name: วารีรยา สุขเกษม
- Nickname: ST
- Nationality: Thai
- Born: 23 October 2011 (age 14)

Sport
- Country: Thailand
- Sport: Skateboarding
- Event: Street
Medal record
Women's Skateboarding
Representing Thailand
SEA Games
Bronze medal – third place	2025 Thailand	Street

Vareeraya Sukasem (Thai: วารีรยา สุขเกษม) is a goofy-stance Thai skateboarder. She became the first Thai skateboarder to compete in the Olympics Games. She is also one of the youngest athletes in the 2024 Olympics. Sukasem also participated in the World Championship 2023 in Tokyo and Pro Tour 2024 in Dubai.

== 2024 Summer Olympics ==
Sukasem became the first Thai ever to compete in skateboarding at the Summer Olympics in 2024, as well as the youngest Thai woman who has competed in skateboarding. She finished in 17th place in the preliminary round with 200.75 points.
