= Momiji Nishiya =

Japanese skateboarder (born 2007)

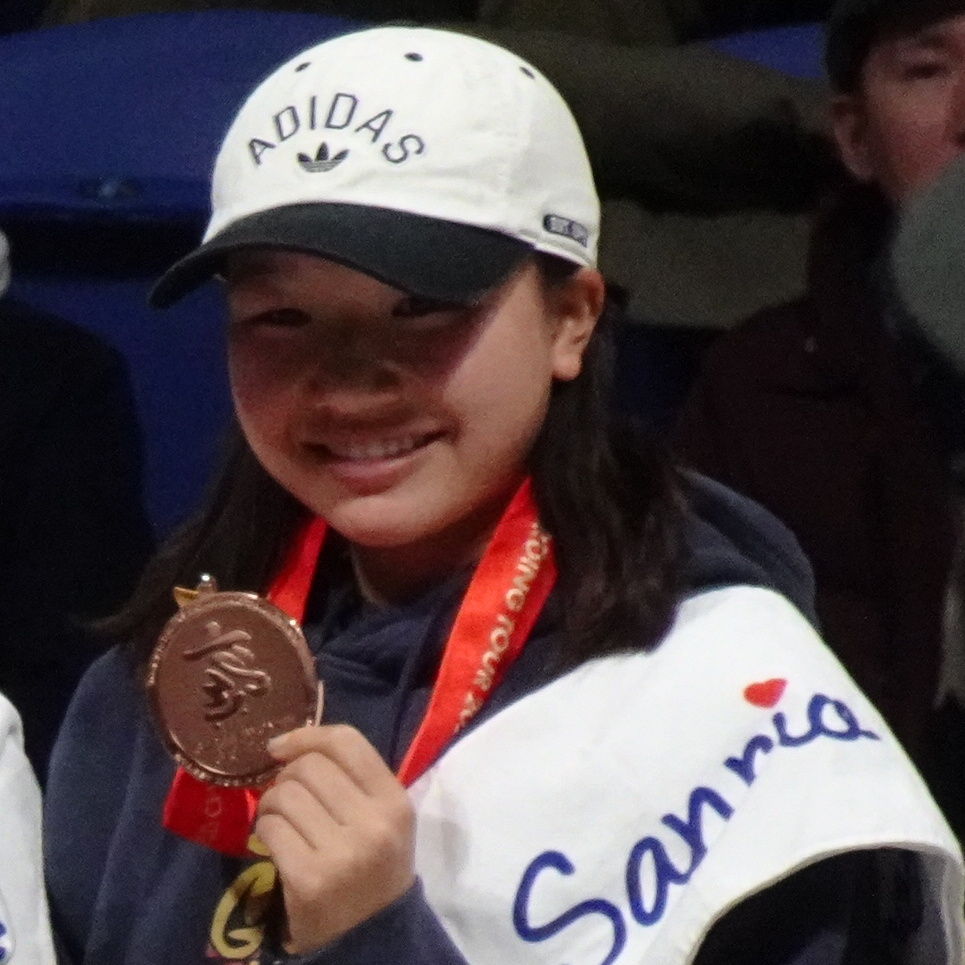
- Nishiya at the 2023 World Skateboarding Championship

Personal information
- Native name: 西矢椛
- Full name: Momiji Nishiya
- Born: 30 August 2007 (age 18) Osaka, Japan

Sport
- Country: Japan
- Sport: Skateboarding
- Position: Regular-footed
- Rank: 7th
- Event: Street
Medal record
Women's street skateboarding
Representing Japan
Olympic Games
| Gold medal – first place | 2020 Tokyo | Street |
World Championships
| Silver medal – second place | 2020 Rome | Street |
| Silver medal – second place | 2024 Rome | Street |
| Bronze medal – third place | 2022 Rio de Janeiro | Street |
| Bronze medal – third place | 2023 Sharjah | Street |
X Games
| Gold medal – first place | 2022 California | Street |
| Gold medal – first place | 2026 Chiba | Street best trick |
| Silver medal – second place | 2019 Minneapolis | Street |
| Silver medal – second place | 2023 Chiba | Street |
| Bronze medal – third place | 2023 California | Street |

Momiji Nishiya (西矢 椛, Nishiya Momiji; born 30 August 2007) is a Japanese skateboarder. At the 2020 Summer Olympics, she won the first ever gold medal in the women's street competition. Winning at the age of 13, she is the youngest person ever to win a gold medal for Japan, and the third youngest after Marjorie Gestring and Klaus Zerta to ever win an event at the Summer Olympics.

== Career ==
Nishiya competed at the 2019 Summer X Games in the women's street event where she scored 90.00 and won a silver medal.

Nishiya competed at the 2021 Street Skateboarding World Championships where she scored 14.17 and won the silver medal.

As of June 2021, Nishiya was ranked fifth in the Olympic World Skateboarding rankings, and qualified for the 2020 Summer Olympics. She competed in the women's street competition, where she scored 15.26 and won the gold medal. At the age of 13 years and 330 days, she became the youngest Olympic gold medalist for Japan, and the third youngest gold medalist in Olympic history.

Nishiya competed at the X Games California 2023 in the women's street event where she scored 86.66 and won a bronze medal. She failed to qualify for the 2024 Summer Olympics. In September 2024, she won a silver medal at the World Skateboarding Championship.

In February 2026, following her graduation from Osaka Gakugei High School, she announced her intention to forgo university enrollment and pursue a career as a professional skateboarder and focus on training for the 2028 Summer Olympics.
