= Skateboarding at the 2024 Summer Olympics – Qualification =

This article details the qualifying phase for skateboarding at the 2024 Summer Olympics. The competition at these Games will comprise a total of 88 athletes coming from their respective National Olympic Committees (NOCs), an increment of ten percent from the Tokyo 2020 roster size (80). Each NOC can enter a maximum of twelve skateboarders (six for each gender) in both the street and park events. Host country France reserves four quota places with one for each event, while the same amount is entitled to the eligible NOCs interested to have their skateboarders compete for Paris 2024 through a Tripartite Commission Invitation. To be registered for a spot granted by the Universality rules, the athlete must finish within the top 50 of his or her respective skateboarding event in the Olympic World Skateboarding Rankings (OWSR) at the end of the qualification period.

The remaining skateboarders will provide an opportunity to book their tickets to the Games through a biennial OWSR list prepared by the World Skate. The qualification window commences on June 22, 2022, and will conclude two years later (June 23, 2024), with the official list of skateboarders competing for the Games published a day after the deadline.

The OWSR will attribute qualification points to the skateboarders eligible to compete in five-tier tournaments, namely the World Championships, Olympic Qualifying Series (scheduled for May to June 2024), the World Pro Tour series, the five-star events, and the three-star events. Unlike the previous edition, the continental championships will be counted as part of the three-star events, with the national meets excluded from the qualification strata. The rankings will culminate in a triad of invitational events through a four-month-long Olympic Qualifying Series before they officially select twenty-two of the world's best skateboarders across all four medal events to compete in Paris 2024.

The OWSR will run at three intervals within the qualification window — June 22 to December 31, 2022; January 1 to December 31, 2023; and January 1 to June 23, 2024. Athletes will be selected by name at the end of the period, respecting the three-member quota limit for each NOC, gender, and event, until the list is complete. Every event must also feature the highest-ranked skateboarder on the OWSR from a continent without representation, if available.

== Qualification summary ==
- (H) Host nation

NOC	Men		Women		Total
NOC	Park	Street	Park	Street	Athletes
Argentina		2			2
Australia	3	1	2	3	9
Brazil	3	3	3	3	12
Canada		3	1		4
China			1	3	4
Colombia		1			1
Denmark	1				1
Finland			1		1
France (H)	1	3	2	1	7
Germany	1		1		2
Great Britain	1		2		3
Italy	2				2
Japan	1	3	3	3	10
Morocco			1		1
Netherlands				2	2
Portugal	1	1			2
Puerto Rico	1				1
Slovakia		1			1
South Africa	1	1		1	3
Spain	2		2	2	6
Sweden	1				1
Thailand				1	1
United States	3	3	3	3	12
Total: 23 NOCs	22	22	22	22	88

== Men's events ==
=== Men's park ===
Event	Places	Qualified skateboarder
Host nation	0	—
Olympic World Skateboarding Rankings (as of June 23, 2024)	20	Tate Carew (USA); Keegan Palmer (AUS); Gavin Bottger (USA); Tom Schaar (USA); Augusto Akio (BRA); Kieran Woolley (AUS); Luigi Cini (BRA); Pedro Barros (BRA); Danny León (ESP); Viktor Solmunde (DEN); Keefer Wilson (AUS); Alex Sorgente (ITA); Hampus Winberg (SWE); Vincent Matheron (FRA); Steven Piñeiro (PUR); Yuro Nagahara (JPN); Alessandro Mazzara (ITA); Thomas Augusto (POR); Alain Kortabitarte (ESP); Dallas Oberholzer (RSA)**
Universality places	0	—
Reallocation of unused host quota place	1	Andrew MacDonald (GBR)
Reallocation of unused universality place	1	Tyler Edtmayer (GER)
Total	22	

** Continental representation

=== Men's street ===
Event	Places	Qualified skateboarder
Host nation	0	—
Olympic World Skateboarding Rankings (as of June 23, 2024)	20	Ginwoo Onodera (JPN); Sora Shirai (JPN); Yuto Horigome (JPN); Jagger Eaton (USA); Nyjah Huston (USA); Gustavo Ribeiro (POR); Chris Joslin (USA); Richard Tury (SVK); Matías Dell Olio (ARG); Aurélien Giraud (FRA); Kelvin Hoefler (BRA); Giovanni Vianna (BRA); Cordano Russell (CAN); Matt Berger (CAN); Ryan Decenzo (CAN); Joseph Garbaccio (FRA); Felipe Gustavo (BRA); Vincent Milou (FRA); Shane O'Neill (AUS)**; Brandon Valjalo (RSA)**
Universality places	0	—
Reallocation of unused host quota	1	Jhancarlos González (COL)
Reallocation of universality place	1	Mauro Iglesias (ARG)
Total	22	

** Continental representation

== Women's events ==
=== Women's park ===
Event	Places	Qualified skateboarder
Host nation	0	—
Olympic World Skateboarding Rankings (as of June 23, 2024)	20	Kokona Hiraki (JPN); Arisa Trew (AUS); Sakura Yosozumi (JPN); Sky Brown (GBR); Hinano Kusaki (JPN); Raicca Ventura (BRA); Bryce Wettstein (USA); Ruby Trew (AUS); Dora Varella (BRA); Ruby Lilley (USA); Isadora Pacheco (BRA); Minna Stess (USA); Naia Laso (ESP); Heili Sirviö (FIN); Lilly Stoephasius (GER); Nana Taboulet (FRA); Lola Tambling (GBR); Fay De Fazio Ebert (CAN); Emilie Alexandre (FRA); Aya Asaqas (MAR)**
Universality places	0	—
Reallocation of unused host quota	1	Julia Benedetti (ESP)
Reallocation of unused universality place	1	Zheng Haohao (CHN)
Total	22	

** Continental representation

=== Women's street ===
Event	Places	Qualified skateboarder
Host nation	1	Lucie Schoonheere (FRA)
Olympic World Skateboarding Rankings (as of June 23, 2024)	20	Coco Yoshizawa (JPN); Liz Akama (JPN); Rayssa Leal (BRA); Funa Nakayama (JPN); Chloe Covell (AUS); Cui Chenxi (CHN); Paige Heyn (USA); Poe Pinson (USA); Zeng Wenhui (CHN); Zhu Yuanling (CHN); Roos Zwetsloot (NED); Pâmela Rosa (BRA); ~~Jazmín Álvarez~~ (COL); Natalia Muñoz (ESP); Liv Lovelace (AUS); Keet Oldenbeuving (NED); Gabi Mazetto (BRA); Vareeraya Sukasem (THA); Mariah Duran (USA); Daniela Terol (ESP); Boipelo Awuah (RSA)**
Universality places	0	—
Reallocation from universality place	1	Haylie Powell (AUS)
Total	22	

** Continental representation
