= Bryce Wettstein =

American skateboarder (born 2004)

Personal information
- Born: Bryce Ava Wettstein; January 10, 2004 (age 22) Encinitas, California, U.S.
- Occupation: Skateboarder
- Height: 5 ft 9 in (175 cm)
- Website: brycewettstein.com

Sport
- Country: United States
- Sport: Skateboarding
- Position: Regular-footed
- Rank: 9th (Park; October 2023)
- Events: Park, vert
- Pro tour(s): Dew Tour

Achievements and titles
- Olympic finals: 2020 Summer Olympics: Women's park – 6th; 2024 Summer Olympics: Women's park – 6th
- National finals: 2019 USA Skateboarding National Championships: Women's park – Gold; 2021 USA Skateboarding National Championships: Women's park – Bronze
Medal record
Women's park skateboarding
Representing United States
Pan American Games
Bronze medal – third place	2023 Santiago	Park
X Games
Bronze medal – third place	2021 Los Angeles	Park
Bronze medal – third place	2025 Salt Lake City	Park

Bryce Ava Wettstein (born January 10, 2004) is a regular-footed American skateboarder.

== Skateboarding ==
Wettstein has been skating and surfing since she was 5 years old. In the 2017 Vans Park Series, Wettstein placed 2nd after a run that scored 83.43. She finished behind Brighton Zeuner's 84.69 and ahead of Nora Vasconcellos's 82.36. In 2018, Bryce placed 2nd at Dew Tour Women's Pro Park, finishing behind Nicole Hause and ahead of Jordyn Barratt. Wettstein is among the 16 members of the inaugural USA Skateboarding National Team announced in March 2019. Wettstein won the 2019 National Championship for Women's Park held at CATF. Wettstein qualified for both the 2020 Tokyo and 2024 Paris Olympic Games where she competed in the women's park event. She placed sixth overall in both events.
