= USA Skateboarding National Team =

The 16 members of the inaugural U.S.A Skateboarding National Team were announced in March 2019. The skaters competed to qualify for Skateboarding at the 2020 Tokyo Olympic Games. Twelve American skateboarders qualified for the 2020 and 2024 Olympics.

== 2019 National Team ==
The skaters named to the 2019 USA Skateboarding National Team included:

=== Women's Park ===
- Brighton Zeuner (Encinitas, CA)
- Bryce Wettstein (Encinitas, CA)
- Jordyn Barratt (Haleiwa, HI)
- Nicole Hause (Stillwater, MN)

=== Men's Park ===
- Alex Sorgente (Lake Worth, FL)
- Tom Schaar (Malibu, CA)
- Tristan Rennie (Rialto, CA)
- Zion Wright (Jupiter, FL)

=== Women's Street ===
- Alexis Sablone (Old Saybrook, CT)
- Jenn Soto (Jersey City, NJ)
- Leo Baker (Covina, CA)
- Mariah Duran (Albuquerque, NM)

=== Men's Street ===
- Chris Joslin (Hawaiian Gardens, CA)
- Jagger Eaton (Mesa, AZ)
- Louie Lopez (Hawthorne, CA)
- Nyjah Huston (Laguna Beach, CA)

== 2020 Olympic Team ==
Twelve American skateboarders, the maximum number allowed per country, qualified to skate on behalf of the United States at the 2020 Summer Olympics in Tokyo. The skaters who qualified were:

=== Women's Park ===
- Bryce Wettstein
- Brighton Zeuner
- Jordyn Barratt

=== Men's Park ===
- Heimana Reynolds
- Cory Juneau
- Zion Wright

=== Women's Street ===
- Mariah Duran
- Alexis Sablone
- Alana Smith

=== Men's Street ===
- Nyjah Huston
- Jake Ilardi
- Jagger Eaton

== 2024 Olympic Team ==
In 2024, twelve American skateboarders qualified to skate for the United States at the 2024 Summer Olympics in Paris. The team was:

=== Women's Park ===
- Bryce Wettstein
- Minna Stess
- Ruby Lilley

=== Men's Park ===
- Gavin Bottger
- Tate Carew
- Tom Schaar

=== Women's Street ===
- Paige Heyn
- Mariah Duran
- Poe Pinson

=== Men's Street ===
- Nyjah Huston
- Jagger Eaton
- Chris Joslin
