= Ruby Lilley =

American skateboarder (born 2006)

Personal information
- Born: December 2, 2006 (age 19) Ocean City, Maryland, U.S.
- Home town: Oceanside, California, U.S.

Sport
- Country: United States
- Sport: Skateboarding
- Position: Goofy-footed
- Event(s): Park, vert
Medal record
Women's skateboarding
Representing the United States
X Games
Silver medal – second place	2023 Japan	Park

Ruby Lilley (/ˈlɪli/ LIL-ee; born December 2, 2006) is an American skateboarder and member of the USA Skateboarding National Team. She represented the United States at the 2024 Summer Olympics.

== Early life ==
Lilley was born on a farm in Ocean City, Maryland, where her family raised Angora rabbits, sheep, chickens, goats, and ducks. Growing up she was a ballet and ballroom dancer, before transitioning to skateboarding at ten years old. In 2018, she moved to Oceanside, California to train skateboarding.

== Career ==
Lilley made her X Games debut in 2022 at 15 years old where she finished in seventh place at both the spring and summer games. She again competed at the 2023 X Games in Japan and won a silver medal in the park event.

Lilley competed at the 2022 World Skateboarding Championship in Sharjah, which was postponed until February 2023, where she finished in 17th place. She then competed at the 2023 World Skateboarding Championship in Rome in October 2023 where she finished in seventh place.

Following the 2024 Olympic Qualifier Series, Lilley qualified for the 2024 Summer Olympics. She competed in the women's park event, where she scored 75.07 in the prelims, and failed to advance to the finals.
