= Tate Carew =

American skateboarder (born 2005)

- Carew in 2026

Personal information
- Born: March 8, 2005 (age 21) San Diego, California, U.S.

Sport
- Country: United States
- Sport: Skateboarding
- Position: Goofy-footed
- Rank: 1st
- Event: Park
Medal record
Men's skateboarding
Representing the United States
World Championships
| Bronze medal – third place | 2023 Rome | Park |

Tate Carew (/kəˈruː/ kə-ROO; born March 8, 2005) is an American professional skateboarder and member of the USA Skateboarding National Team. He represented the United States at the 2024 Summer Olympics.

== Early life ==
Carew attended Point Loma High School in San Diego, California.

== Career ==
Carew competed at the 2019 World Skateboarding Championship where he was the youngest competitor to reach the finals at 14 years old.

He was named to the USA Skateboarding National Team in 2023. He competed at the 2023 World Skateboarding Championship and won a bronze medal in the park event.

In six Olympic qualifier events, Carew never finished below sixth place and had three podium finishes. He won the 2024 Olympic Qualifier Series competition. As of June 2024, he was ranked first in the Olympic World Skateboarding rankings, and qualified for the 2024 Summer Olympics. During the men's park event he finished in fifth place with a score 91.17.
