= Nicole Hause =

American skateboarder

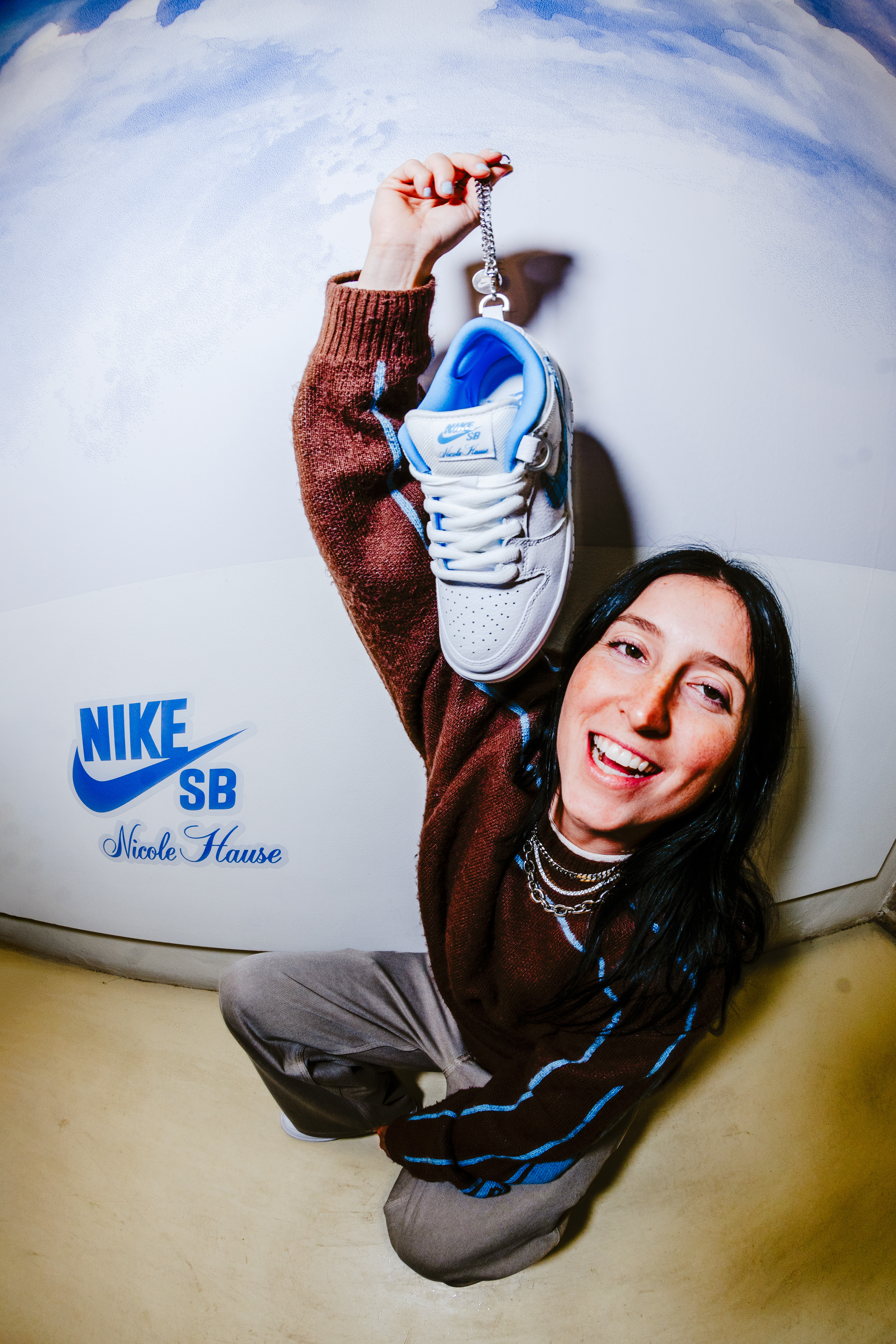

Personal information
- Nationality: American
- Born: September 30, 1997 (age 27); Stillwater, Minnesota, U.S.
- Home town: Los Angeles, California
- Website: nicolehause.com

Sport
- Country: United States
- Sport: Skateboarding

Nicole Hause (born September 30, 1997) is an American goofy-footed professional skateboarder. She is known for her transition skateboarding, including aerial maneuvers and high-speed performances.

== Early life and career ==
Hause was born in Stillwater, Minnesota. She began competing in skateboarding events in 2013 and made her debut at the 2016 Summer X Games. In 2017, she won the Vert Attack Women's Championship, finishing ahead of Kisa Nakamura and Allysha Le, and successfully defended her title in 2018, placing ahead of Arianna Carmona and Allysha Le.

In 2018, Hause was named the grand marshal of the CenterPoint Energy Torchlight Parade. The same year, she won both the Combi Pool Classic and Dew Tour Park competitions.

In March 2019, Hause was named one of the 16 members of the inaugural U.S.A Skateboarding National Team, competing in the Women's Park division in an attempt to qualify for the 2020 Summer Olympics.

In 2021, Hause transitioned her focus to creative partnerships, collaborating with Nike and Real Skateboards. By September 2022, she was actively involved in media and design projects, working with brands such as Nike and Air Jordan, and appearing in advertising campaigns and product launches. In December 2024, she released her signature Nike Dunk colorway.

== Competition results ==
Year	Competition	Category	Result
2017	Girls Combi Pool Classic	Women's	Won (2nd place)
2018	Dew Tour, Long Beach	Women's	Won (1st place)
2018	Girls Combi Pool Classic	Women's	Won (1st place)
2019	Highest Air and Longest Grind Exposure Vert and Bowl	Women's	Won (1st place)
