= Alana Smith (skateboarder) =

American skateboarder (born 2000)

Personal information
- Born: October 20, 2000 (age 26) Mesa, Arizona, U.S.
- Occupation: Professional skateboarder

Sport
- Country: United States
- Sport: Skateboarding
- Position: Goofy-footed
- Rank: 19th (Street; July 2021)
- Events: Street, park
- Pro tour(s): Dew Tour; Street League Skateboarding
Medal record
Women's street skateboarding
Representing the United States
World Championships
Bronze medal – third place	2015 Chicago	Street
X Games
Silver medal – second place	2013 Barcelona

Alana Smith (born October 20, 2000) is an American professional skateboarder from Mesa, Arizona. They are goofy-footed.

== Skateboarding career ==
In 2013, at the age of 12, Smith landed a 540 McTwist and became the youngest medalist in X Games history when they won silver in the women's park event at the X Games Barcelona.

They finished first in the Girls Combi Pool Classic at the World Cup of Skateboarding in 2015.

In 2016, Smith and Nora Vasconcellos joined the skate team of the Eugene, Oregon boardshop Tactics, as the brand's female ambassadors.

In 2021, Smith competed in the women's street skateboarding event at the 2020 Summer Olympics, finishing in last place out of the 20 competitors at the heat stage. In so doing, Smith became the first openly non-binary athlete to compete at the Olympics and had the pronouns they/them inscribed on their skateboard. However, a number of sports presenters misgendered Smith during coverage of the event, including BBC Sport and NBC Sports commentators.

== Personal life ==
Smith is bisexual and non-binary, using they/them pronouns. Other than skateboarding, Smith’s other hobbies include music, film, photography, and camping. In 2021, after the Tokyo games, Smith became involved with a corporate- and athletic- coaching company Exos which focuses on creating safe space skate sessions. Smith has expressed how skateboarding has helped them in dark places and wants to help others find the love of the sport that has helped them keep going. Smith was asked why they made their coming out and sexual identity public during an ESPN interview and shared that they wanted to show the world a side of them that is very vulnerable and sensitive while representing and helping kids that needed a support system. They also had started binding their chest in 2016 and received top surgery the following year. They said their gender dysphoria started in their teen years due to Instagram comments relating to a change they made in their hair.
