= Minna Stess =

American skateboarder (born 2006)

Personal information
- Born: April 4, 2006 (age 20) Petaluma, California, U.S.

Sport
- Country: United States
- Sport: Skateboarding
- Position: Regular-footed
- Event: Park
Medal record
Women's skateboarding
Representing the United States
World Championships
Bronze medal – third place	2023 Rome	Park
Bronze medal – third place	2026 São Paulo	Park

Minna Stess (born April 4, 2006) is an American professional skateboarder and a member of the USA Skateboarding National Team. She is a two-time World Skateboarding Championship bronze medalist. She represented the United States at the 2024 Summer Olympics in the women's park event.

== Early life ==
Stess was born to Andrew Stess and Moniz Franco, has one brother, Finnley. Her father is a consultant in the music industry. Born in Petaluma, California, for high school she attended Petaluma's Valley Oaks Independent Study School.

== Career ==
=== Early years ===
Stess began skateboarding at two years old. In 2013, at eight years old, she became the first girl ever to win the California Amateur Skateboard League. In 2014, during the King of Groms Championship, she became the first female skater to compete in all three skateboarding finals (street, mini ramp and bowl), and was the first girl to win the mini ramp competition. Her parents built a concrete skatepark in their backyard for their children. She turned professional at 11 years old.

In January 2019, Stess broke and dislocated her elbow, which required three surgeries and several months of recovery.

In 2019, Stess was named to the USA Skateboarding National Team. She made her X Games debut in August 2019 at 13 years old, and was one of the youngest competitors in the competition. In July 2021, she was named an alternate for the United States at the 2020 Summer Olympics.

=== 2021–2023: World championship bronze medal ===
Stess won a gold medal at the 2021 USA National Championships in the park competition, becoming the youngest champion in the event at 15 years, two months old.

In October 2022, at 16 years old, Stess competed in the women's park division of the STU Open in Rio de Janeiro, Brazil, where she finished in third place, behind Sky Brown and Sakura Yosozumi. She competed at the 2022 World Skateboarding Championship in Sharjah, in the United Arab Emirates, which was postponed until February 2023, and finished in seventh place.

In October 2023, she won a bronze medal in the park event at the 2023 World Skateboarding Championship in Rome, Italy, with a score of 90.80. She became the first American to medal in the women's event since the event became known as the World Skateboarding Championship in 2018.

=== 2024 Summer Olympics ===
With her result in the 2024 Olympic Qualifier Series, Stess qualified to represent the United States at the 2024 Summer Olympics. She competed in the women's park event at Place de la Concorde at 18 years old. She scored 54.71 in the prelims, and did not advance to the finals.

=== 2025–present: World championship bronze medal ===
Stess competed at the 2025 World Skateboarding Championship, which were postponed until March 2026, and won a bronze medal in the park event with a score of 83.90.

== See also ==
- List of select Jewish skateboarders
