= Letícia Bufoni =

Brazilian-American skateboarder

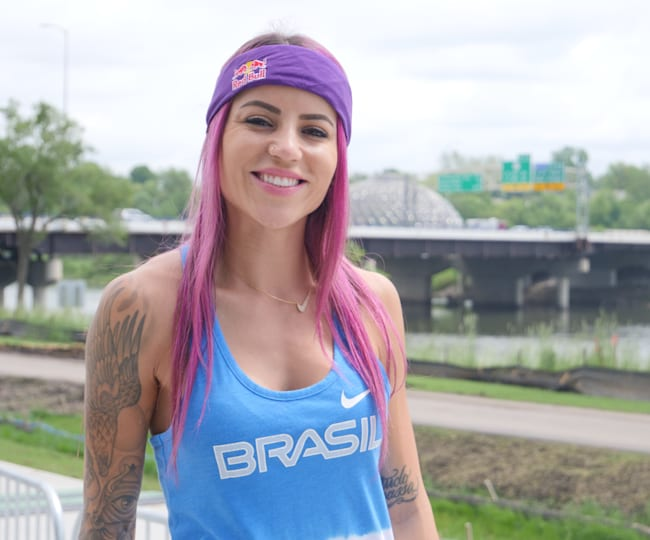
- Bufoni in 2021

Personal information
- Nickname: Princesa do Skate (Princess of skateboarding)
- Born: Letícia Bufoni e Silva; April 13, 1993 (age 33) São Paulo, Brazil
- Occupation: Skateboarder
- Years active: 2002–present
- Height: 5 ft 3 in (1.60 m)
- Weight: 97 lb (44 kg)

Sport
- Country: Brazil
- Sport: Skateboarding
- Turned pro: 2017
Medal record
Women's street skateboarding
Representing Brazil
World Championships
| Gold medal – first place | 2015 Chicago | Street |
| Silver medal – second place | 2016 Los Angeles | Street |
| Silver medal – second place | 2017 Los Angeles | Street |
| Silver medal – second place | 2018 Rio de Janeiro | Street |
Summer X Games
| Silver medal – second place | 2010 Los Angeles | Street |
| Bronze medal – third place | 2011 Los Angeles | Street |
| Silver medal – second place | 2012 Los Angeles | Street |
| Gold medal – first place | 2013 Foz do Iguaçu | Street |
| Gold medal – first place | 2013 Barcelona | Real Women |
| Gold medal – first place | 2013 Los Angeles | Street |
| Bronze medal – third place | 2014 Austin | Street |
| Bronze medal – third place | 2017 Minneapolis | Street |
| Gold medal – first place | 2018 Norway | Street |
| Silver medal – second place | 2018 Sydney | Street |
| Gold medal – first place | 2019 Shanghai | Street |
| Gold medal – first place | 2021 California | Street |

Letícia Bufoni e Silva (born April 13, 1993) is a Brazilian-American professional street skateboarder. She is a six-time X Games gold medalist.

== Early life ==
Bufoni was born in São Paulo. She began skating at age nine, and her grandmother bought her first skateboard when she was 11.

"I grew up in the street playing sports all the time. We didn't have computers, no smartphones. All of the kids started skating, so I did too."

"My dad broke my board so I wouldn't skate anymore. I started to skateboard when I was nine years old; I was skating with all the guys in my neighborhood, and he was mad at me because I was the only girl in the middle of 10 guys. He smashed my board in front of me and said; "You're not skating anymore, ever again". Her father eventually relented.

At the age of 14, Bufoni moved to the United States with older friends. She attended Hollywood High School, but left after missing so much school that she was in danger of being expelled.

== Career ==
In 2007, Bufoni competed in her first X Games at the age of 14 in Los Angeles.

She is a five-time X Games gold medalist. She tied Elissa Steamer's decade-old record for most gold in Women's SKB Street with her win at XG Shanghai 2019. Overall she earned six straight medals in X Games Women's SKB Street (2010-2014) and the title at Shanghai 2019.

She has become one of the world's best-known and most influential action sports athletes. Bufoni was ranked the #1 women's street skateboarder by World Cup of Skateboarding four years in a row 2010-2013 and appeared in The Guinness Book of World Records (2017) for the "Most Wins Of The World Cup of Skateboarding. In 2013, she was nominated for an ESPY Award - Best Female Action Sports Athlete.

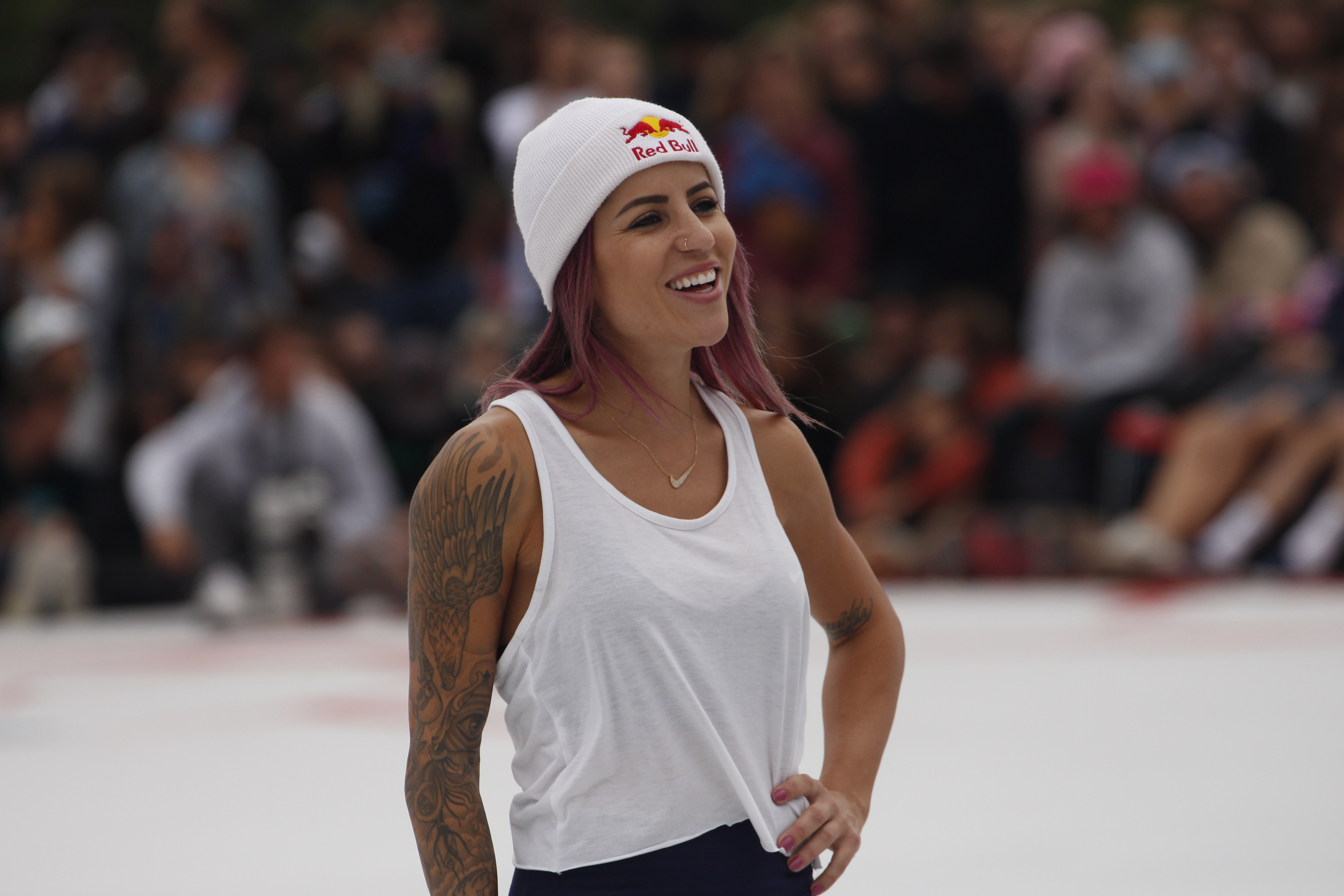
Bufoni at the 2021 Red Bull Paris Conquest

In 2015, she won the first Street League Skateboarding Women's SLS Super Crown World Championship in Chicago, IL. She also appeared in the ESPN Magazine - The Body Issue, being the first skateboarder from Brazil to do so. She was also the first female skater to sign for Nike SB in 2015.

In 2018, Forbes named Bufoni one of The Most Powerful Women In International Sports for 2018 (#25) and made Sports Pro Media's list for The World's Most Marketable Athletes for 2018 (#41). Further in 2018, she was named to the Forbes Brazil "Under 30" list.

In 2022, Bufoni set a world record (verified by Guinness World Records) for highest skateboard grind outside the back of a flying aircraft. This happened when the aircraft was flying over Merced, California. A video of this went viral in 2023. The aircraft was a C-130 transport plane, and was flying at an altitude of 9,022 feet when Bufoni did the skateboard grind.

Bufoni is the official athlete representative for World Skate, the International Olympic Committee-recognized governing body for Skateboarding.

== Racing ==
A racing fan since her youth, Bufoni raced go-karts at a track on the parking lot of the Shopping Aricanduva mall, which was located near a skate park that she grew up on. She eventually stopped to focus on skateboarding when she moved to America, but occasionally dabbled in supercar racing when available. She built a drift car in 2020.

In 2022, as she scaled back her skating career to focus on other projects, she began racing in Nitro Rallycross' side-by-side class. Despite racing without practice, Bufoni finished seventh and sixth in her first weekend at ERX Motor Park. She ran the full 2023-24 Nitrocross SxS season and placed fifth in points.

Bufoni made her desert racing debut at the NORRA 500 in October 2023, where she shared a modified Nissan Frontier with Chris Forsberg. The two won the Stock Production class.

== Personal life ==
On April 7, 2021, Bufoni became a citizen of the United States.

== Competitions ==
- 2015 - 1st Place: Far'n High Women's Finals - Paris, France
- 2015 - 1st Place: Excellent Mystic Skate Cup Women's Street - Prague, Czech Republic
- 2015 - 1st Place: Street League Super Crown Women's Finals - Chicago, USA
- 2016 - 1st Place: Far'n' High Women's Finals - Paris, France - Paris, France
- 2016 - 1st Place: Mystic Sk8 Cup Women's Open - Prague, Czech Republic
- 2016 - 2nd Place: Street League Super Crown Women's Finals - Los Angeles, USA
- 2017 - 3rd Place: X Games Minneapolis Skateboard Street - Minneapolis, USA
- 2017 - 2nd Place: Street League Super Crown Women's Finals - Los Angeles, USA
- 2018 - 1st Place: X Games Norway Skateboard Street - Oslo, Norway
- 2018 - 2nd Place: World Cup of Skateboarding Street - Vigo, Spain
- 2018 - 2nd Place: X Games Skateboard Street - Sydney, Australia
- 2019 - 1st Place: X Games Skateboard Street - Shanghai, China
- 2019 - 2nd Place: Dew Tour - Long Beach, California, USA
- 2021 - 1st Place: X Games Skateboard Street - Vista, California, USA

== Awards ==
- Nickelodeon 2016 Kids' Choice Sports - Queen Of Swag
- Cartoon Network 2014 Hall of Game Awards - She Got Game

== In media ==
Bufoni is a playable character in the video game Tony Hawk's Pro Skater 5. She also appears in Tony Hawk's Pro Skater 1 + 2, an enhanced remake of the first two Pro Skater games with an updated roster of playable skaters. She also appeared in the follow-up Tony Hawk's Pro Skater 3 + 4.

Bufoni plays a featured role in the music video for "Snapback" by Old Dominion.
