= Jennifer Soto =

American skateboarder

Personal information
- Nickname: Jenn Soto
- Born: May 10, 1996 (age 30) Bronx, New York, U.S.

Sport
- Country: United States
- Sport: Skateboarding

Jennifer Soto (born May 10, 1996) is an American goofy-footed skateboarder from Jersey City, New Jersey.

== Skateboarding ==
Soto started skating in 6th grade.

In 2018, Soto won the Street League Skateboarding Pro Open London.

Soto placed 2nd at Dew Tour Long Beach 2018 and 2nd at Exposure Street Pro 2017.

Soto is among the 16 members of the inaugural U.S.A Skateboarding National Team announced in March, 2019. Soto will receive support from USA Skateboarding while she competes to qualify for the 2020 Tokyo Olympic Games in the Women's Street division.
