= Gavin Bottger =

American skateboarder (born 2007)

Personal information
- Nickname: Gavo
- Born: January 5, 2007 (age 19) South Lake Tahoe, California, U.S.

Sport
- Country: United States
- Sport: Skateboarding
- Position: Goofy-footed
- Rank: 3rd
- Event: Park
Medal record
Men's skateboarding
Representing the United States
World Championships
Gold medal – first place	2023 Rome	Park
X Games
Silver medal – second place	2018 Minneapolis	Next X Park
Silver medal – second place	2019 Minneapolis	Next X Park
Silver medal – second place	2021 California	Park
Silver medal – second place	2022 California	Park
Bronze medal – third place	2023 Chiba	Park
Bronze medal – third place	2024 Chiba	Park

Gavin Bottger (/ˈbɒtɡər/ BOT-ghər; born January 5, 2007) is an American skateboarder and member of the USA Skateboarding National Team. He won gold at the 2023 World Skateboarding Championship. He represented the United States at the 2024 Summer Olympics.

== Early life ==
Bottger was born to Renee and Scott Bottger in South Lake Tahoe, California and raised in Oceanside, California. He began skateboarding at five years old.

== Career ==
In December 2022, Bottger was named to the USA Skateboarding National Team. He competed at the 2022 World Skateboarding Championship in Sharjah, which were postponed until February 2023, where he broke his wrist on his second run in the quarterfinals. He underwent surgery and was out for six weeks.

He then competed at the 2023 World Skateboarding Championship in Rome in October 2023 where he won a gold medal in the park event with a score of 94.03.

As of June 2024, Bottger was ranked third in the Olympic World Skateboarding rankings, and qualified for the 2024 Summer Olympics. During the men's park event he finished in tenth place during the preliminary round with a score 86.95 and failed to advance to the finals.
