= Viktor Solmunde =

Danish skateboarder (born 2007)

Personal information
- Nationality: denmark
- Born: 31 August 2007 (age 18)

Sport
- Country: Denmark
- Sport: Skateboarding
- Position: Goofy-footed
- Event: Park
Medal record
Men's park skateboarding
Representing Denmark
World Championships
Bronze medal – third place	2024 Rome	Park

Viktor Solmunde (born 31 August 2007) is a Danish skateboarder. He represented Denmark at the 2024 Summer Olympics. He is a World Skateboarding Championship bronze medalist.

== Career ==
During the first leg of the 2024 Olympic Qualifier Series in Shanghai, Solmunde competed with a splint on his foot after suffering a broken ankle. He finished in 18th place during the event. Following the Olympic Qualifier Series, he qualified for the 2024 Summer Olympics. During the park event at the Olympics he finished in 21st place and failed to advance to the finals.

In September 2024, he competed at the 2024 World Skateboarding Championship and won a bronze medal in the park event with a score of 90.58.
