= Nollie =

Skateboarding maneuver

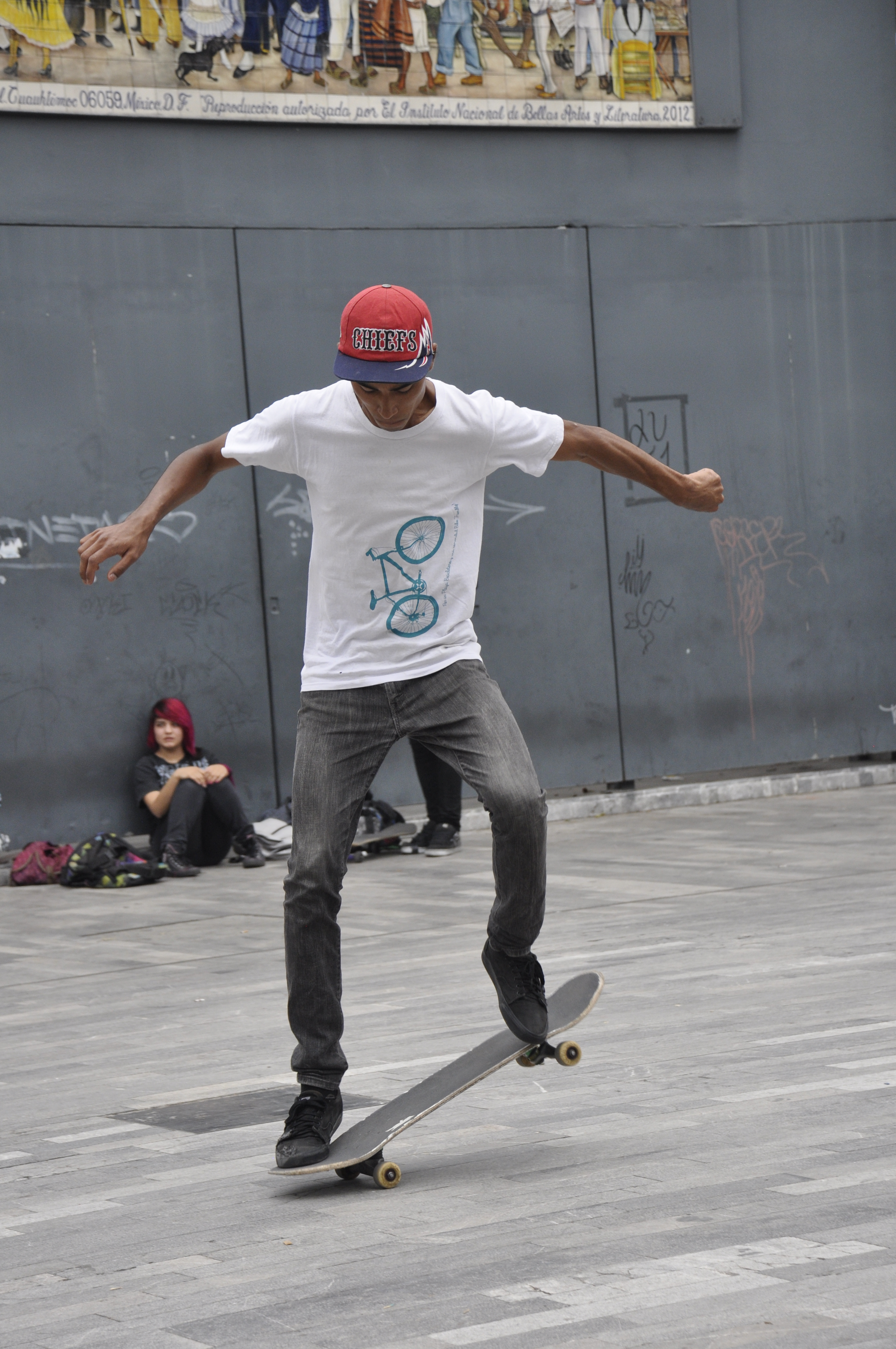
Initial stage of a nollie. Alameda Central, Mexico City, 2015.

In skateboarding, a nollie, short for "nose ollie", is an ollie executed at the front of the board while the rider is positioned in their natural stance. Professional skateboarders Karl Watson, Shuriken Shannon, Tuukka Korhonen, and Sean Malto have been recognized for their ability to perform the nollie trick. A nollie can be easily confused with a fakie ollie, whereby the rider uses their original foot position but is instead riding backwards ("fakie" is the skateboard term for riding in a backwards direction, in your usual stance, while riding the opposite of your usual stance is referred to as "switch").

== Description ==
A nollie is a variation of the ollie where the skateboarder uses the front foot to push the nose of the skateboard down and the back foot is slid in a backwards direction to achieve lift-off from the ground; this is the opposite of an ollie, whereby the rider uses the back foot to push down the tail and the front foot to slide forwards. It is similar to a switch ollie riding backwards and Malto has stated in an instructional video: "It's more a like a switch ollie, but from the front."

== Execution ==
The forward rolling motion that is required for the execution of a nollie can make it easier to push the nose of the skateboard down towards the ground than when executing an ollie.

== Variations ==
Like ollies, a nollie can be combined with other tricks to form variations. For example, a nollie can be combined with a kickflip to create a nollie flip, or a nollie can be combined with a 360-flip to create a nollie 360-flip.

=== Nollie 180 ===
A nollie whereby the skateboarder and the skateboard rotate 180-degrees after leaving the ground. Both the skateboarder and the skateboard rotate in the same direction, and frontside and backside variations can be performed. After landing the trick, the skateboarder will be facing in the opposite direction.

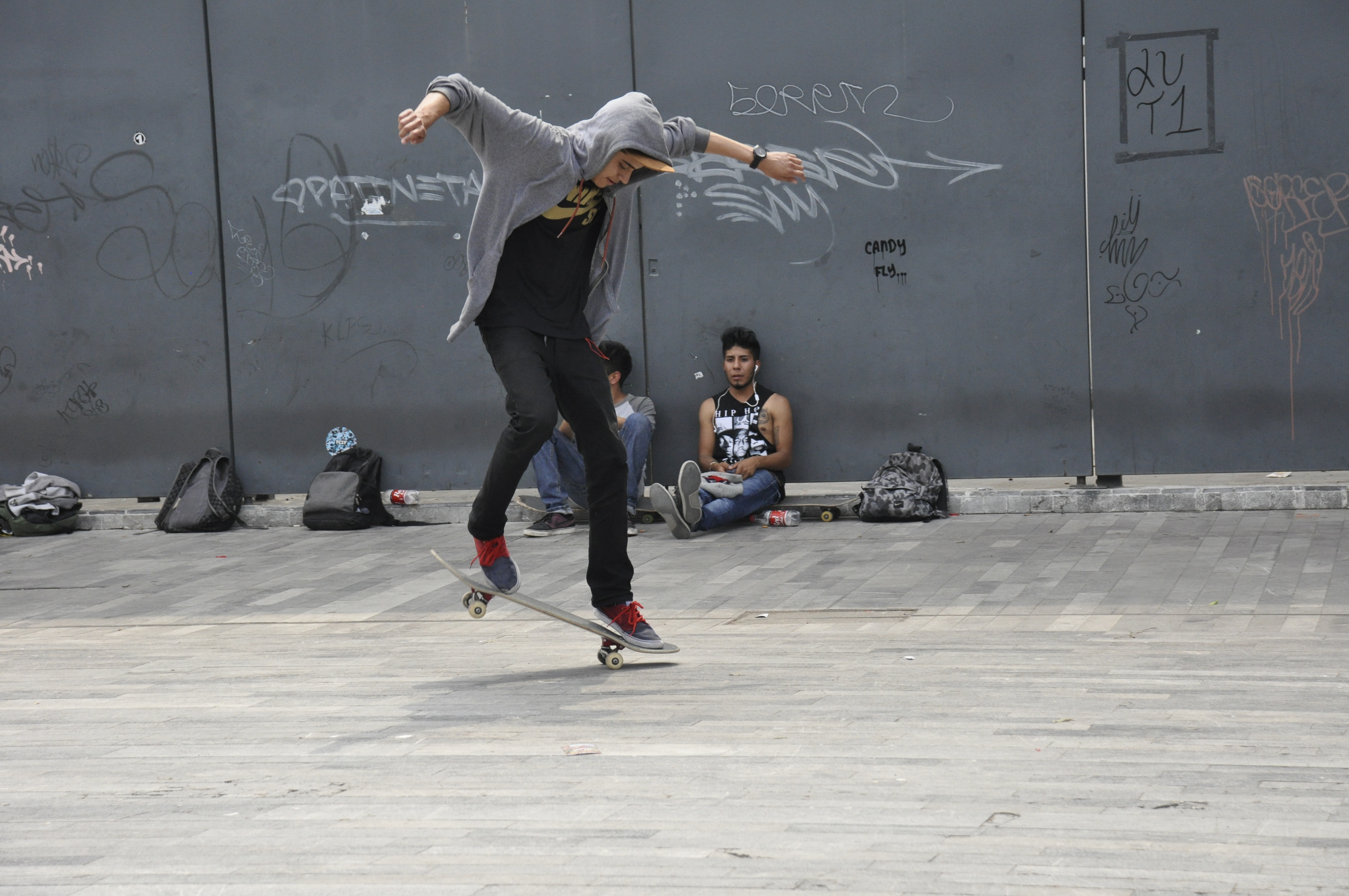
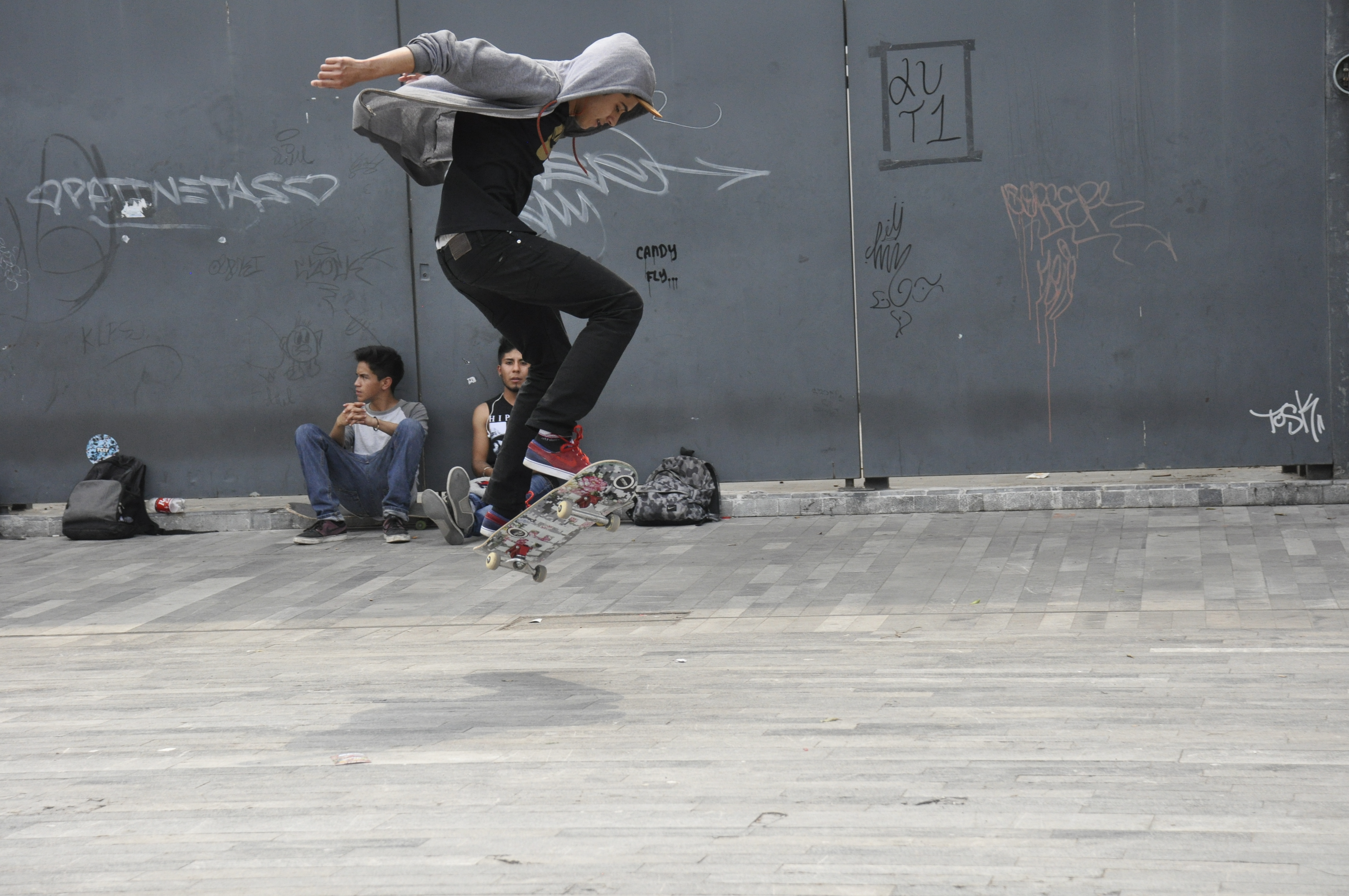
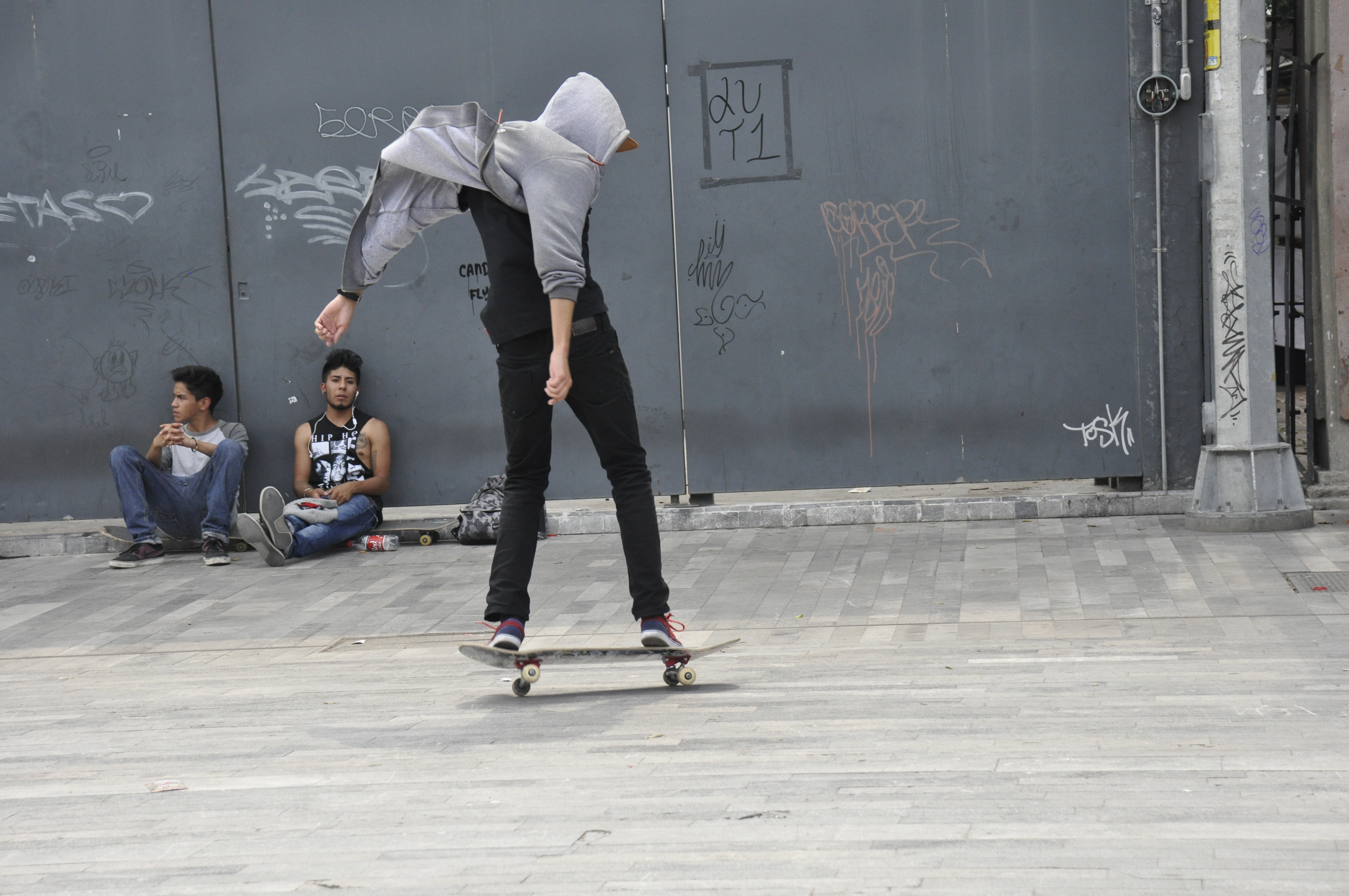
Nollie 180. Alameda Central, Mexico City, 2015.

=== Nollie heelflip ===
A heelflip that is executed at the front of the board, whereby the heel of the back foot executes the flip. Professional skateboarder Josiah Gatlyn has stated that the variation is "basically, just like a backward switch heel[flip]".

=== Helipop ===
Also known as a 'nollie backside 360' (not caballerial, caballerial is fakie), this is a nollie variation whereby the skateboarder and the skateboard rotate 360-degrees after leaving the ground. The trick was invented by Rodney Mullen and can be seen in the Almost: Round Three video during the section when Mullen is skateboarding on the Hollywood Stars in Los Angeles, California, United States (US).

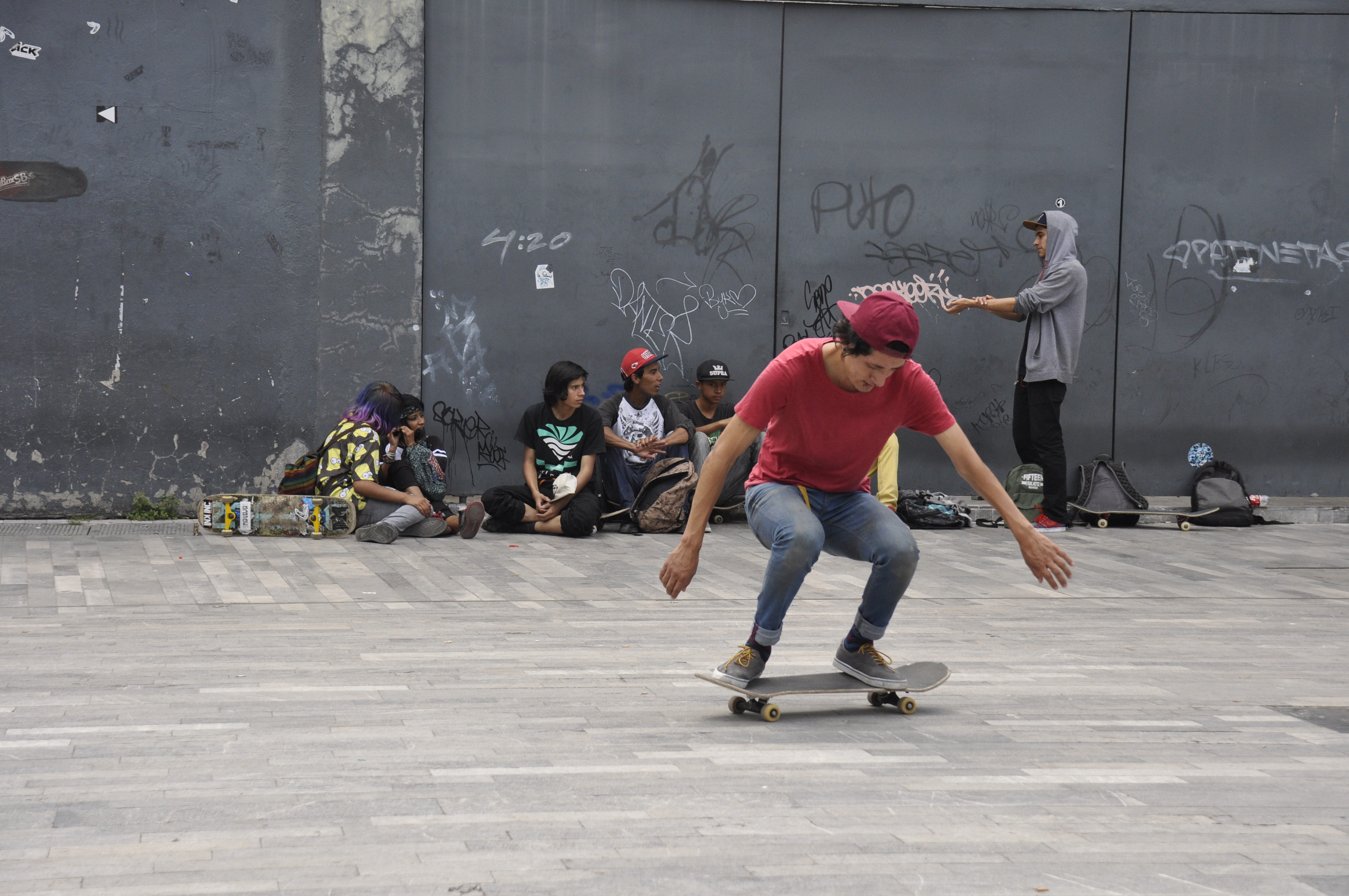
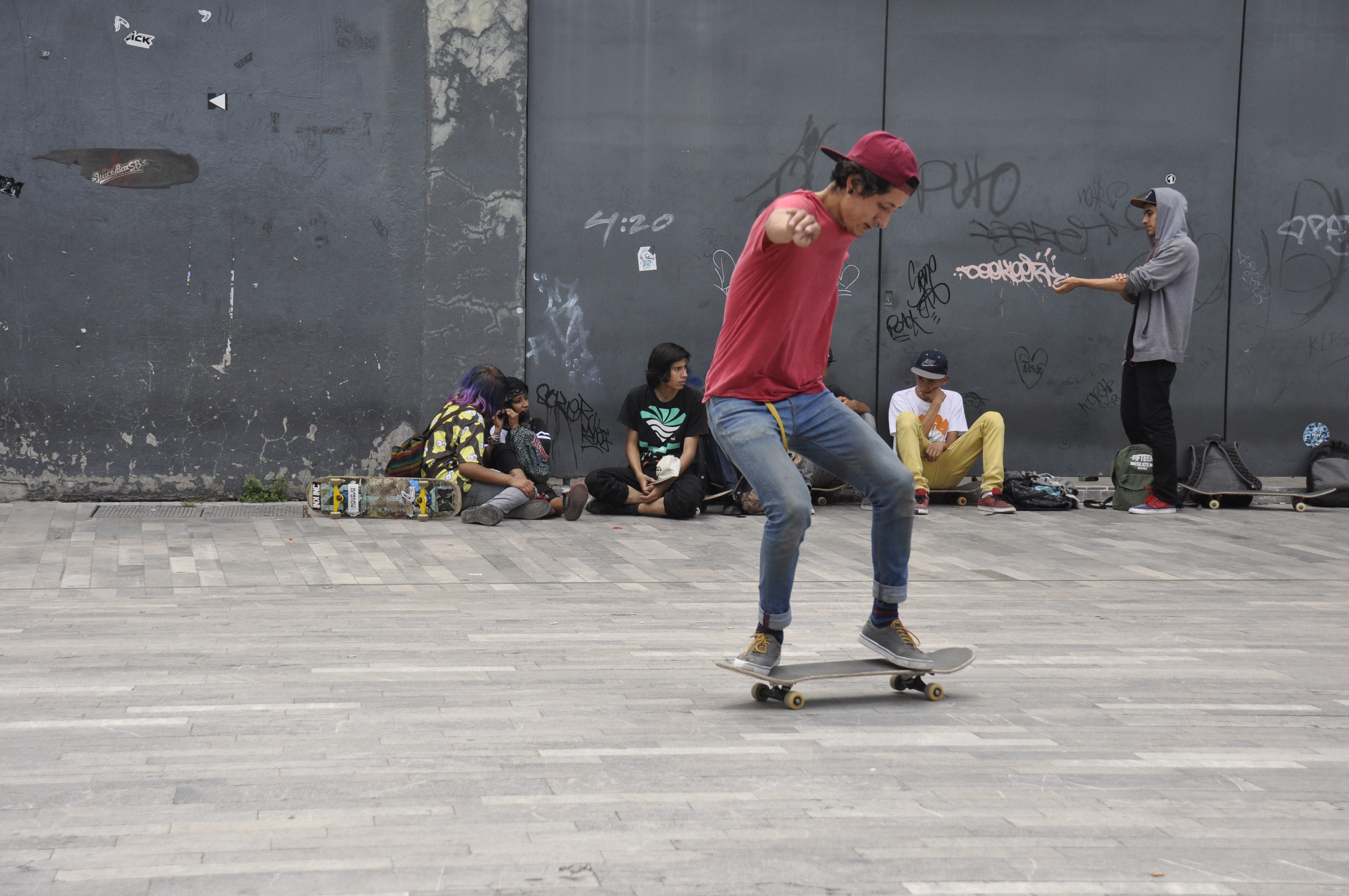
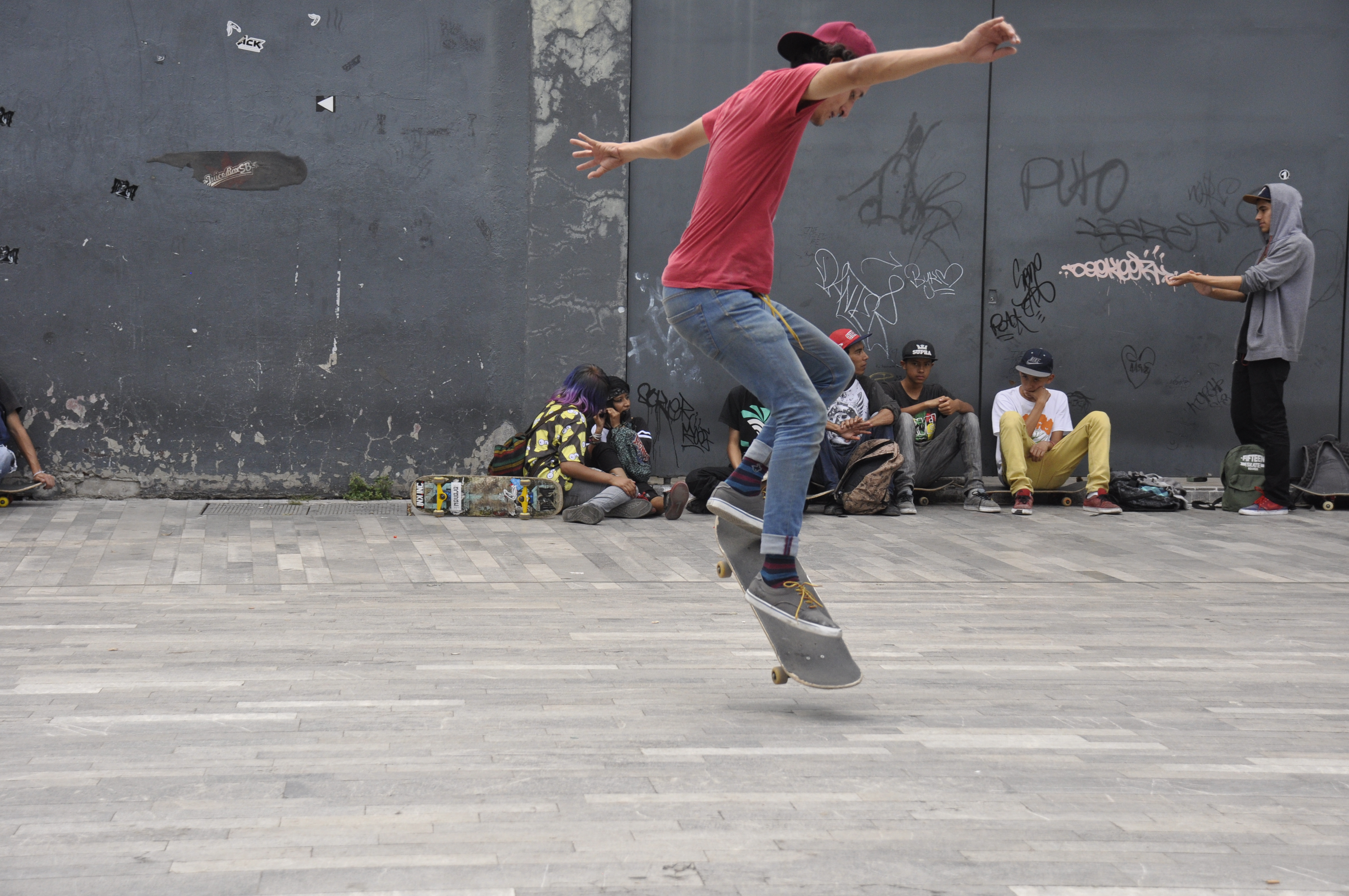
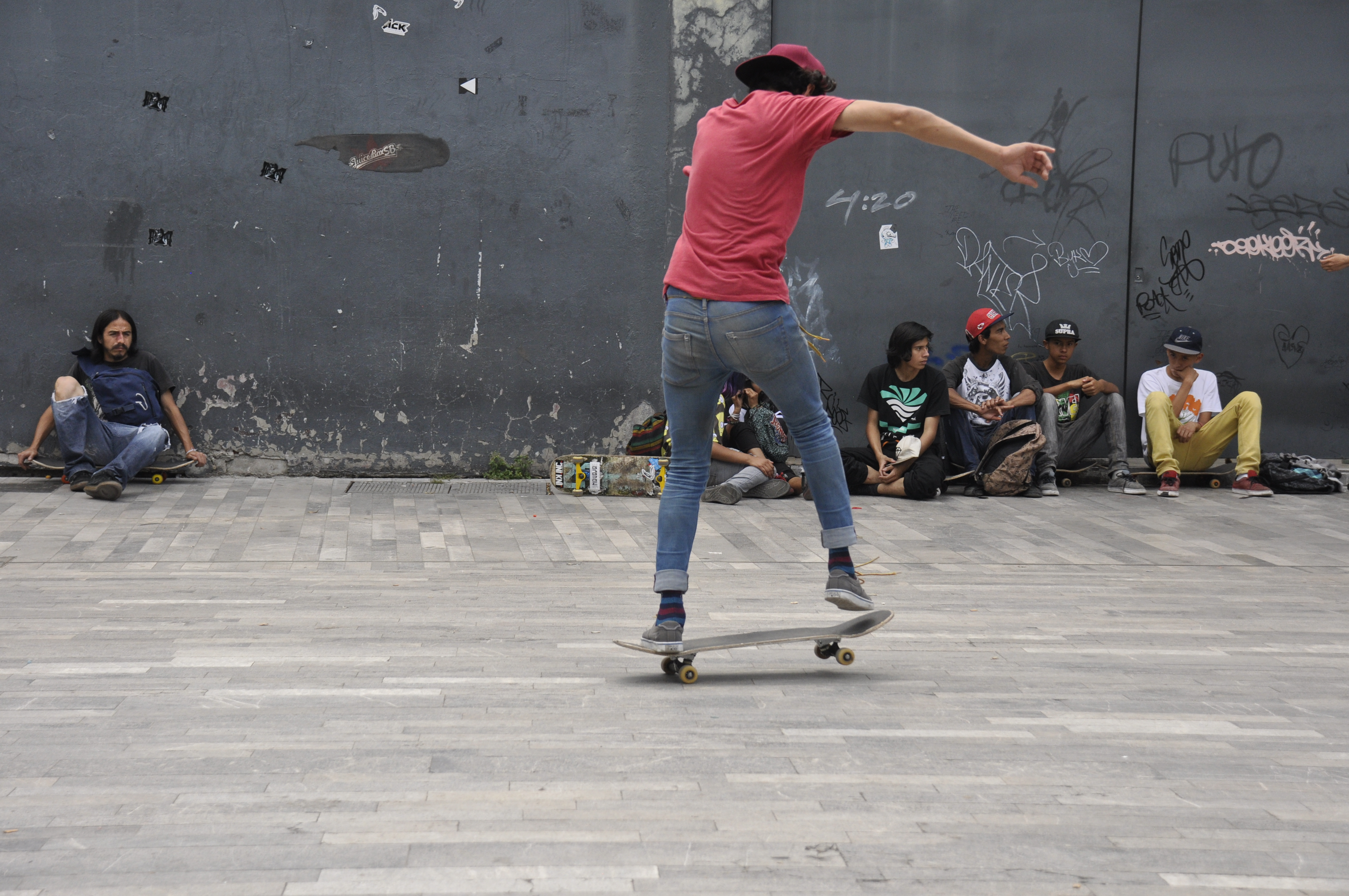
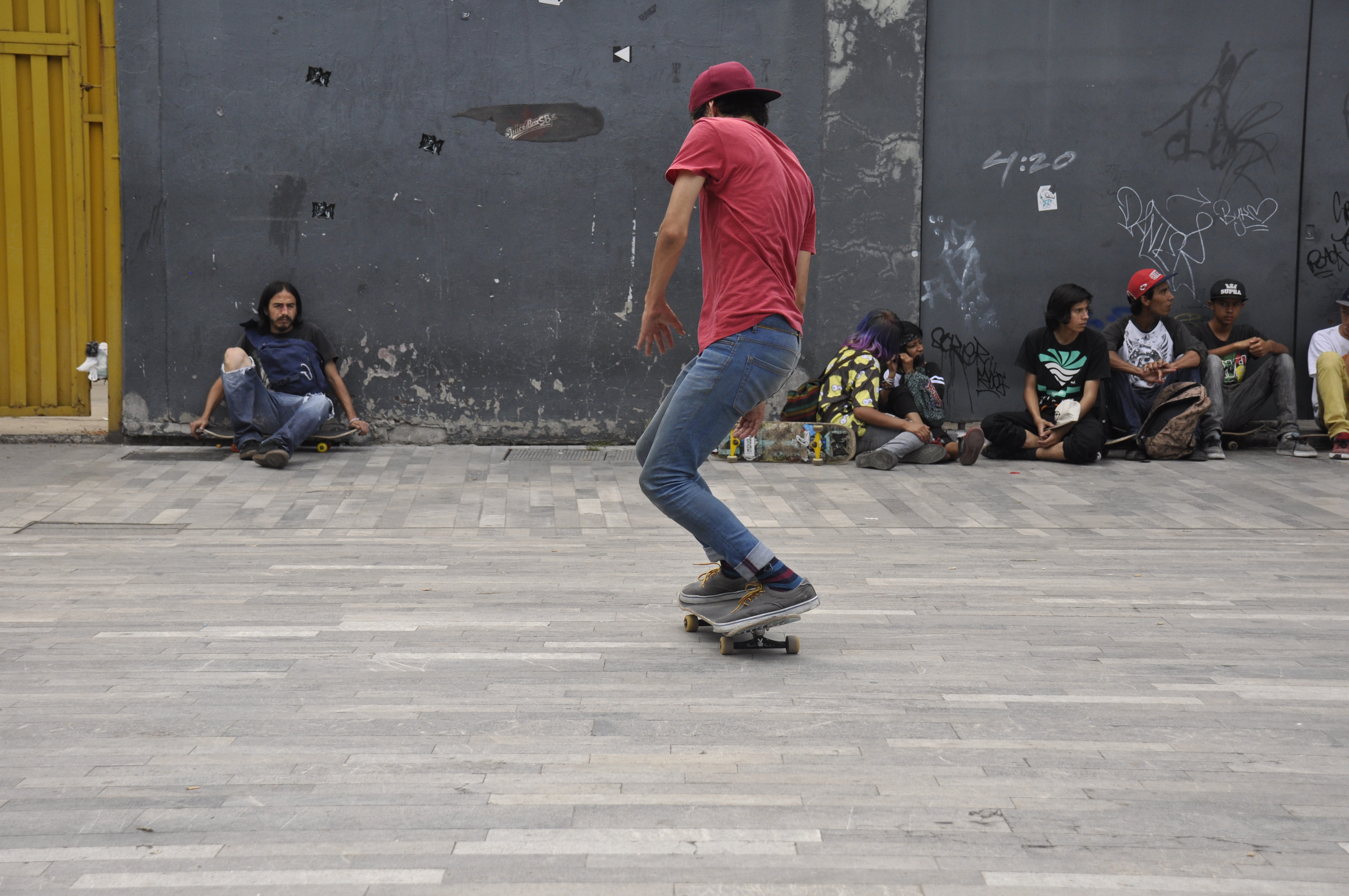
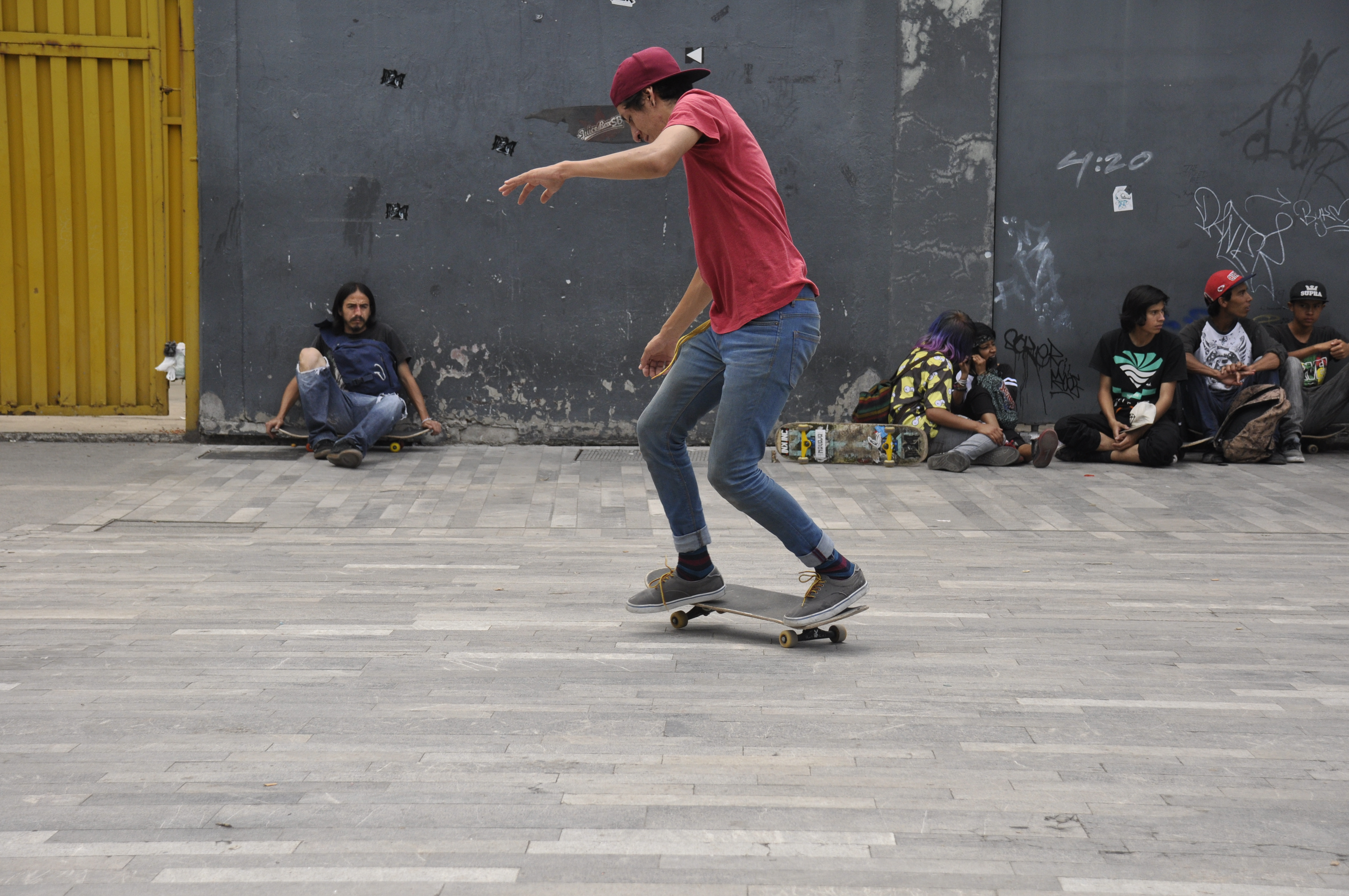
Nollie backside 360. Alameda Central, Mexico City, 2015.

== Notable nollies ==
Professional skateboarder Danny Way executed a nollie down the famous Carlsbad Gap (no longer in existence), located in California, United States (US). The location was notorious for its degree of difficulty due to the upward angle of the landing area.

== See also ==
- Skateboarding
- Rodney Mullen
- Skateboarding trick
- Flip tricks
