= Nanami Onishi =

Japanese skateboarder

Sport
- Country: Japan
- Sport: Skateboarding
- Event: Street
Medal record
Women's street skateboarding
Representing Japan
World Championships
Silver medal – second place	2025 São Paulo	Street

Nanami Onishi (大西七海, Onishi Nanami) is a Japanese skateboarder. She is a World Skateboarding Championship silver medalist.

== Career ==
Onishi competed at the 2025 World Skateboarding Championship, which were postponed until March 2026, and won a silver medal in the street event, in a Japanese podium sweep. She finished with a total score of 146.36.
