= Mariah Duran =

American skateboarder

Personal information
- Born: December 14, 1996 (age 29) Albuquerque, New Mexico, U.S.

Sport
- Country: United States
- Sport: Skateboarding
Medal record
Women's street skateboarding
Representing the United States
World Championships
Bronze medal – third place	2017 Los Angeles	Street
Summer X Games
Gold medal – first place	X Games Sydney 2018	Street
Gold medal – first place	X Games Minneapolis 2018	Street
Silver medal – second place	X Games Austin 2016	Street

Mariah Duran (born December 14, 1996) is a goofy-footed American skateboarder.

== Skateboarding ==
Duran entered her first skateboarding competition at the age of 13 in her hometown of Albuquerque.

In 2016, Duran went Pro for Meow Skateboards, joining then Meow team members Leo Baker, Vanessa Torres, Adrianne Sloboh, and others.

In 2018, Duran won her first gold medal at X Games Minneapolis in the women's skateboarding street competition.

Duran was among the 16 members of the inaugural U.S.A Skateboarding National Team announced in March 2019. Duran competed to qualify for the 2020 Tokyo Olympic Games in the Women's Street division. On June 21, 2021, Duran was announced as part of the inaugural U.S. Olympic skateboarding team by USA Skateboarding. At the Olympics, she competed in the Women's street event. She finished 13th in the preliminary round, which was not high enough to advance to the 8-person final.

Duran again competed in the Women's street event at the 2024 Paris Olympics. She finished in 22nd place in the preliminary round and did not qualify for the final.
