= Skateboarding at the 2026 Mediterranean Games =

Skateboarding competition

- Venue: Salinella Urban Center
- Dates: 1 – 2 September
- Competitors: 19 from 8 nations

Skateboarding at the 2026 Mediterranean Games was held at the Salinella Urban Center from 1 to 2 September. It was the inaugural skateboarding event at the Mediterranean Games.

== Medal table ==
* Host nation (Italy)

Rank	Nation	Gold	Silver	Bronze	Total
1	France	2	1	0	3
2	Italy*	0	1	1	2
3	Spain	0	0	1	1
Totals (3 entries)		2	2	2	6

== Medalists ==
Event	Gold	Silver	Bronze
Men's street	Joseph Garbaccio; France	Max Berguin; France	José Luis Cabarcos; Spain
Women's street	Lucie Schoonheere; France	Gaia Urbinati; Italy	Irene Panzavolta; Italy
