= Raicca Ventura =

Brazilian skateboarder (born 2007)

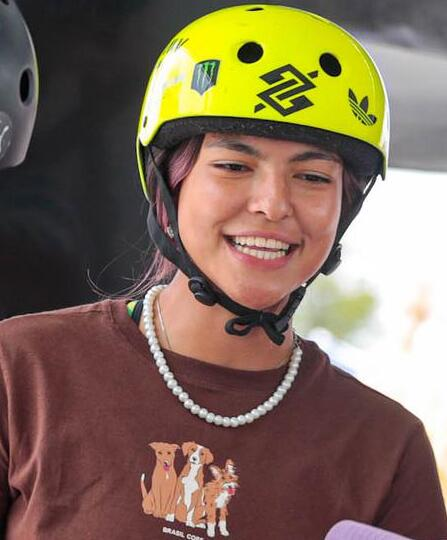
- Ventura in 2025

Personal information
- Full name: Raicca Ventura de Oliveira
- Born: 8 March 2007 (age 19) São Caetano do Sul, Brazil

Sport
- Country: Brazil
- Sport: Skateboarding
- Event: Park
Medal record
Women's park skateboarding
Representing Brazil
World Championships
Gold medal – first place	2024 Rome	Park
Pan American Games
Silver medal – second place	2023 Santiago	Park

Raicca Ventura de Oliveira (born 8 March 2007) is a Brazilian skateboarder. She represented Brazil at the 2024 Summer Olympics. She won gold at the 2024 World Skateboarding Championship.

== Career ==
Ventura made her international debut for Brazil in October 2023 at the 2023 World Skateboarding Championship and finished in fourth place with a score of 87.59. A few weeks later, she then competed at the 2023 Pan American Games and won a silver medal in the park event with a score of 82.54.

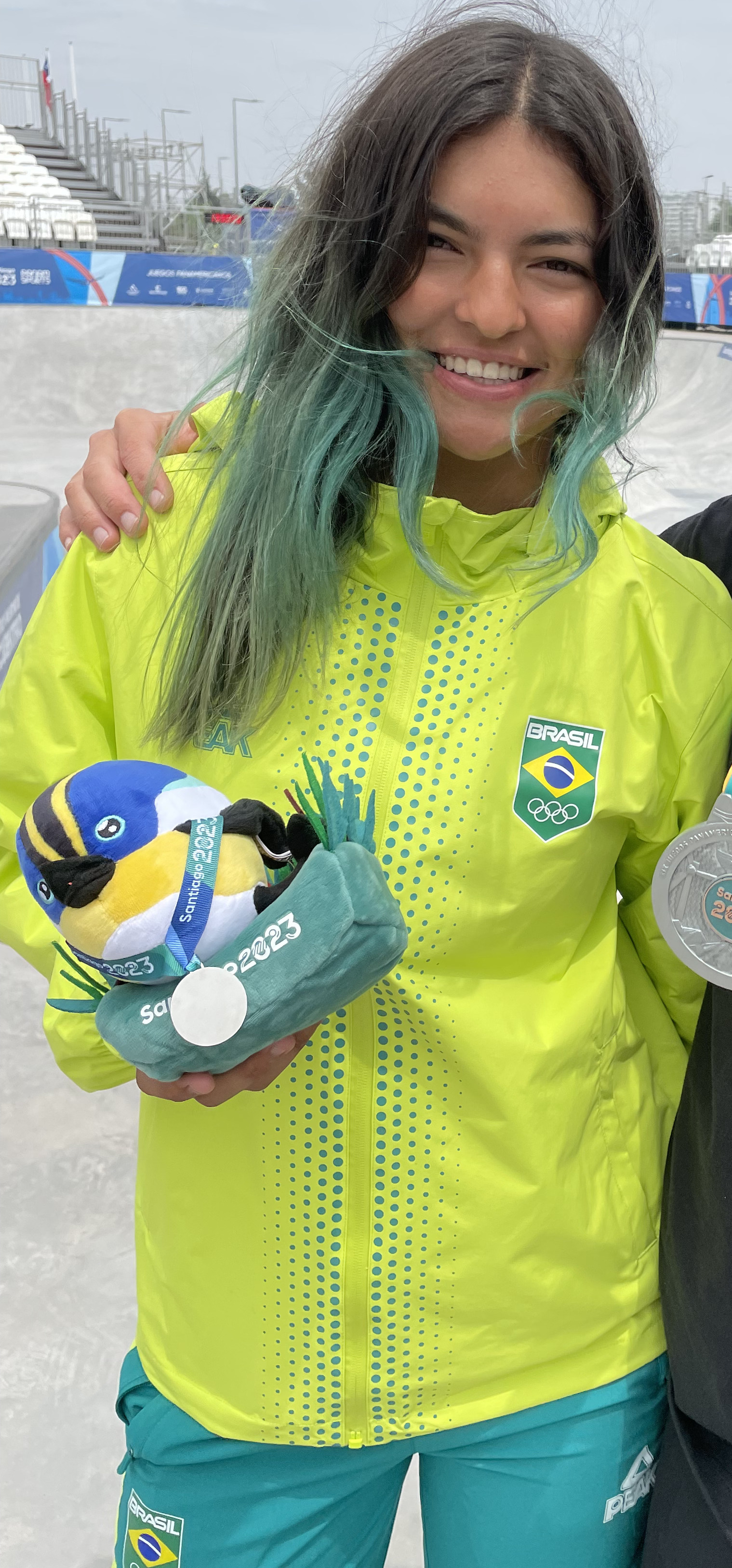
Ventura at the 2023 Pan American Games

As of June 2024, Ventura was ranked eighth in the Olympic World Skateboarding rankings, and qualified for the 2024 Summer Olympics. During the park event she finished in 12th place during the semifinals with a score of 76.24, and failed to advance to the finals. In September 2024, she competed at the 2024 World Skateboarding Championship and won a gold medal with a score of 93.73. In December 2024, she was named a finalist for Prêmio Brasil Olímpico Breakthrough Athlete of the year.

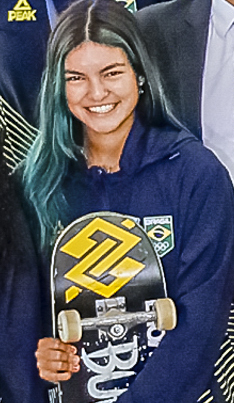
Ventura in 2024
