= Kalani Konig =

Brazilian skateboarder (born 2007)

Personal information
- Born: 10 June 2007 (age 19) Florianópolis, Brazil

Sport
- Country: Brazil
- Sport: Skateboarding
Medal record
Men's skateboarding
World Championships
| Silver medal – second place | 2025 São Paulo | Park |

Kalani Konig (born 10 June 2007) is a Brazilian skateboarder. He is a World Skateboarding Championship silver medalist.

== Career ==
In March 2024, Konig competed in the STU National at Criciúma and won the park event with a score of 95.02. At the World Skate Games, he competed in the park event where he reached the final and finished in eighth place.

In March 2026, at the 2025 World Skateboarding Championship, he won a silver medal in the park event with a score of 94.80 in the final.
