= Roller sports at the 2023 Pan American Games – Women's park =

Women's park at the 2023 Pan American Games
- Venue: Urban Sports Esplanade
- Dates: October 22
- Competitors: 8 from 8 nations
- Winning score: 84.66

Medalists
Gold medal	Fay De Fazio Ebert	Canada
Silver medal	Raicca Ventura	Brazil
Bronze medal	Bryce Wettstein	United States

The women's park competition of the roller sports events at the 2023 Pan American Games was held on October 22 at the Urban Sports Esplanade in Santiago, Chile.

== Schedule ==
Date	Time	Round
October 22, 2023	11:00	Final

== Results ==
Rank	Skateboarder	Nation	Run			Total				
Rank	Skateboarder	Nation	1st place, gold medalist(s)	Fay De Fazio Ebert	Canada	Total	~~82.71~~	84.66	~~74.29~~	84.66
2nd place, silver medalist(s)	Raicca Ventura	Brazil	~~68.10~~	~~68.35~~	82.54	82.54				
3rd place, bronze medalist(s)	Bryce Wettstein	United States	79.95	~~67.51~~	~~31.91~~	79.95				
4	Brigitte Morales	Peru	~~71.35~~	~~66.31~~	75.54	75.54				
5	Nina Aguilar	Mexico	~~66.37~~	~~60.14~~	67.24	67.24				
6	Jofesina Tapia	Chile	62.08	~~12.13~~	~~29.13~~	62.08				
7	Ailin Arzua	Argentina	~~45.56~~	48.26	~~27.33~~	48.26				
8	Nico Russi	Colombia	12.81	~~6.73~~	~~6.20~~	12.81				
