= Jordyn Barratt =

American skateboarder

Personal information
- Born: December 28, 1998 (age 27) Haleiwa, Hawaii, U.S.

Sport
- Country: United States
- Sport: Skateboarding
- Position: Regular stance
- Rank: 13th
- Event: Park
Medal record
Women's park skateboarding
Representing the United States
World Championships
Silver medal – second place	2016 Malmö	Park
Summer X Games
Silver medal – second place	X Games Minneapolis 2017	Park
Bronze medal – third place	X Games Austin 2016	Park

Jordyn Barratt (born December 28, 1998) is a regular-footed American skateboarder and surfer. Barratt lives and works in Encinitas, California.

== Early life and education ==
Raised in her early-life in Haleiwa, Hawaii, Barratt eventually moved to California and graduated from San Dieguito Academy in San Diego County, California, where she was captain of her surf team.

== Skateboarding ==
Barratt was a last-minute addition to the Women’s Skateboard Park field at the X-Games 2016. The competition was her first pro contest. The then 17-year-old Barratt earned bronze. In 2016, Barratt became the first female junior pro to compete in both surfing and skating at the VANS U.S. Open. In 2017, Barratt became the first woman to qualify for and compete at the Dew Tour. In 2017, Barratt won the Vans Girls Combi Bowl pool classic.

In 2018, Barratt placed second at the Vans Park Series women’s skateboard park event in Huntington Beach, California.

Barratt is among the 16 members of the inaugural U.S.A. Skateboarding National Team announced in March 2019. Barratt will compete to qualify for the 2020 Tokyo Olympic Games in the Women's Park division.

=== Sponsors ===
Toyota, Vans, Pro-Tec, Bones, Independent, Mob Grip, Black & Decker, 187 Pads, Samsung
