= Lucie Schoonheere =

French skateboarder (born 2010)

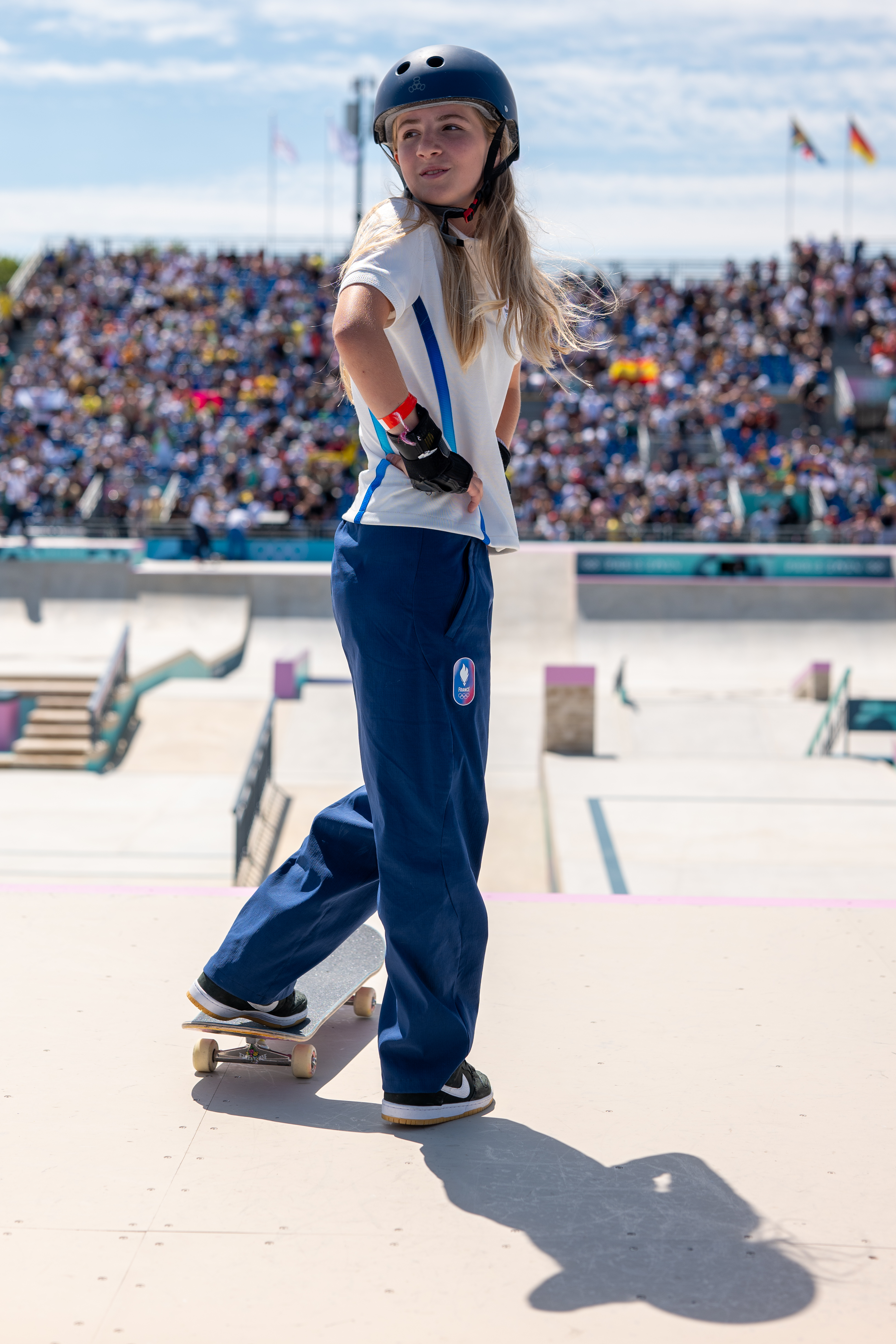
- Schoonheere in 2024

Personal information
- Born: 29 January 2010 (age 16)

Sport
- Country: France
- Sport: Skateboarding
- Event: Street
Medal record
Women's skateboarding
Representing France
Mediterranean Games
| Gold medal – first place | 2026 Taranto | Street |

Lucie Schoonheere (born 29 January 2010) is a French skateboarder. She represented France at the 2024 Summer Olympics.

== Career ==
Schoonheere represented France at the 2024 Summer Olympics. At 14 years old, she was the youngest member of the French delegation. She finished in 11th place during the semifinals of the street competition.

She is a three-time French street national champion. In September 2026, she competed at the 2026 Mediterranean Games and won a gold medal in the street event.
