= Brighton Zeuner =

American professional skateboarder (born 2004)

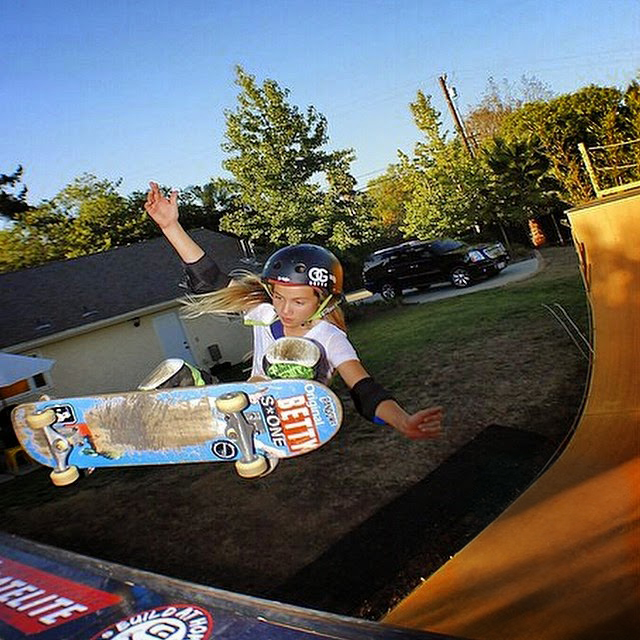

Personal information
- Full name: Brighton Zeuner
- Born: July 14, 2004 (age 21) Scottsdale, Arizona, U.S.
- Height: 5 ft 1 in (155 cm)
- Weight: 108 lb (49 kg)

Sport
- Country: United States
- Sport: Skateboarding
Medal record
Women's park skateboarding
Representing the United States
World Championships
Gold medal – first place	2016 Malmö	Park
Silver medal – second place	2017 Shanghai	Park
Summer X Games
Gold medal – first place	2017 Minneapolis	Park
Gold medal – first place	2018 Minneapolis	Park

Brighton Zeuner (born July 14, 2004) is an American professional skateboarder.

A resident of Newport Beach, she has two X Games gold medals in skateboard park, with her first title in 2017 making her the youngest champion in X Games history at just day over 13 years old. She is also the youngest female X Games competitor, having skateboarded at the age of eleven in 2016. She has become a regular at the Vans Park Series events, having won two Vans Park World Championships. She wins competitions with high-flying and twisting tricks and strong fundamentals as she moves over obstacles in the park. At the 2018 X Games, she already had the high score when she decided to try and up her score to win the gold.

Zeuner was among the 16 members of the inaugural U.S.A Skateboarding National Team announced in March 2019. Zeuner skated the 2020 Tokyo Olympic Games in the Women's Park division. This was the first contest she ever skated without her father being allowed to be there. She placed 12th overall..

== Early life ==
Brighton Zeuner was born in Scottsdale, Arizona. Her father and her brother Jackson got her into skateboarding when her father returned to the hobby due to Jackson's new love of it. She would practice at home on her brother's decks until she got her own skateboard.

Having spent the summers in San Diego County, the family finally moved to Encinitas full-time and Brighton and her brother wanted a big ramp in the backyard. Their parents, with the direction of Pros PLG and Jeff Grosso, built an 80's style vert ramp, which she had for three years, that helped Brighton progress very fast at the young age of nine. She soon became as good a skateboarder as many of the boys and started to love competing.

In order to balance schoolwork with competitions, Zeuner attends a school that gives her flexibility.

"It's five times a week, there's a little homeschooling, but it's cool because the teachers understand when you have to go and why," she said. "They try to get you caught up before you leave because there's no such thing as doing work when you're at an event. They understand that."

== Career ==
In 2015, Brighton and her brother joined the cast of "Camp Woodward," gaining upwards of 1m views per episode. In 2016, she began competing professionally, having been invited to Van's Pool Party, Vans US open, X Games and ending the season winning the Inaugural Vans Park Series Championships in Malmo Sweden. The same year in August, she became the first ever Vans Park Series World Champion, just after breaking another history milestone as the youngest female athlete to ever compete at the X-Games with the age of 11.

In 2016, she won the Vans Park Series World Championships in Malmo, Sweden.

In 2017, she became the youngest gold medalist of all-time at X Games Minneapolis when she won Women's Skateboard Park the day after her 13th birthday, which gave her a spot in the Guinness Book of World Records.

In 2018, she won her second Vans Park Series World Championship in Suzhou, China.

Also in 2018, she became the youngest back-to-back gold medalist with another win at X Games Minneapolis 2018. She then was nominated for the ESPN's ESPY award for Best Female Action Sports Athlete but the award went to fellow nominee and Olympic gold medalist Chloe Kim.

Skateboarding will be a sport at the 2020 Summer Olympics. She was regarded as a potential gold medalist for Team USA. In the Women's park competition she reached rank 12.

Brighton's training regimen includes proper movement literacy in the primal patterns, basic total body strength training, force production and deceleration skills (jumps/hops) and anaerobic endurance training.
