= Joseph Garbaccio =

French skateboarder (born 1998)

Personal information
- Born: 1 April 1998 (age 28) Le Havre, France

Sport
- Country: France
- Sport: Skateboarding
Medal record
Men's skateboarding
Representing France
Mediterranean Games
Gold medal – first place	2026 Taranto	Men's street

Joseph Garbaccio (born 1 April 1998) is a French professional skateboarder. Although he competes in the bowl discipline, he also competes in street. He skates in a regular stance (left foot forward).

== Early life ==
Garbaccio started skateboarding around the age of 5 thanks to his older brother and the DVS Skate More video.

== Career ==
Garbaccio won his first French championship title at age 14. He would go on to win this competition 9 times in total, with 2 victories in the bowl category and 6 victories in the street category. He also received various titles at the FISE World Championships, notably finishing first several times at different stages (Saudi Arabia, China, Montpellier, etc.). He also finished 3rd at the 2019 Simple Session, and 3rd at the Instax Skateboard Street Contest, organized by FISE Montpellier in 2020 and 2025. He participated 4 times in the Street League and was ranked 201st in the 2022 Global Ranking. In 2024, Garbaccio participated in the 2024 Summer Olympics in the men's street category, where he finished 20th. He competed at the 2026 Mediterranean Games, where he won the gold medal in men's street.

== Other works ==
Garbaccio published his first video on his YouTube channel, an Instagram best-of compilation, on 22 July 2019. Since then, he has published approximately one video every one to two weeks. His YouTube channel reached 311k subscribers in 2025. He notably participated in the 2019 DC Skate Tour, which he covered in a video on his YouTube channel. Since late 2020 and early 2021, he has been trying to film a new street skating video for YouTube. Garbaccio has also appeared on television programs such as Riding Zone, and has been interviewed by various television channels such as France 3 Normandie, Paris-Normandie TV, and on the YouTube channel of radio station Mouv'.
