= World Skateboarding Championship =

Annual competition of park and street skateboarding

The World Skateboarding Championship is an annual competition of men's and women's park skateboarding and street skateboarding, organized by World Skate (WS). Until 2017, the two disciplines were contested in separate tournaments, known as the Vans Park Series World Championship, for park skateboarding, and SLS Super Crown World Championship for street skateboarding.

Due to the 2022 Russian invasion of Ukraine, World Skate banned Russian and Belarusian athletes and officials from its competitions, and will not stage any events in Russia or Belarus in 2022. In 2022, World Skate organised the first Vert skateboarding world championship which was included as part of the 2022 World Skate Games.

== Park skateboarding ==
=== Editions ===
Year	Dates	City and host country
2016	19–20 August	Malmö, Sweden
2017	23 September	Shanghai, China
2018	31 October–3 November	Nanjing, China
2019	12–15 September	São Paulo, Brazil
2022 (2023)	5–12 February	(United Arab Emirates) Sharjah, UAE
2023	1–8 October	Rome, Italy
2024	15–22 September	Rome, Italy
2025	cancelled	~~Washington, D.C., United States~~
2025 (2026)	1–8 March	São Paulo, Brazil
2026	6–10 October	Asunción, Paraguay

=== Medalists ===
==== Men ====
Year	Gold	Silver	Bronze
2016	Alex Sorgente (USA)	Pedro Barros (BRA)	Ivan Federico (ITA)
2017	Oskar Hallberg (SWE)	Pedro Barros (BRA)	Cory Juneau (USA)
2018	Pedro Barros (BRA)	Heimana Reynolds (USA)	Keegan Palmer (AUS)
2019	Heimana Reynolds (USA)	Luiz Francisco (BRA)	Pedro Quintas (BRA)
2022 (2023)	Jagger Eaton (USA)	Augusto Akio (BRA)	Pedro Barros (BRA)
2023	Gavin Bottger (USA)	Luigi Cini (BRA)	Tate Carew (USA)
2024	Augusto Akio (BRA)	Pedro Barros (BRA)	Viktor Solmunde (DEN)
2025 (2026)	Egoitz Bijueska (ESP)	Kalani Konig (BRA)	Tom Schaar (USA)
2026	Egoitz Bijueska (ESP) (2)	Tom Schaar (USA)	Gui Khury (BRA)

==== Women ====
Year	Gold	Silver	Bronze
2016	Brighton Zeuner (USA)	Jordyn Barratt (USA)	Kisa Nakamura (JPN)
2017	Nora Vasconcellos (USA)	Brighton Zeuner (USA)	Kisa Nakamura (JPN)
2018	Sakura Yosozumi (JPN)	Kisa Nakamura (JPN)	Poppy Starr Olsen (AUS)
2019	Misugu Okamoto (JPN)	Sakura Yosozumi (JPN)	Sky Brown (GBR)
2022 (2023)	Sky Brown (GBR)	Cocona Hiraki (JPN)	Sakura Yosozumi (JPN)
2023	Cocona Hiraki (JPN)	Hinano Kusaki (JPN)	Minna Stess (USA)
2024	Raicca Ventura (BRA)	Hinano Kusaki (JPN)	Naia Laso (ESP)
2025 (2026)	Sky Brown (GBR) (2)	Mizuho Hasegawa (JPN)	Minna Stess (USA)
2026	Mizuho Hasegawa (JPN)	Sky Brown (GBR)	Cocona Hiraki (JPN)

== Street skateboarding ==
=== Editions ===
Year	Dates	City and host country
2010	28 August	Glendale, Arizona, United States
2011	28 August	Newark, New Jersey, United States
2012	26 August	Newark, New Jersey, United States
2013	25 August	Newark, New Jersey, United States
2014	24 August	Newark, New Jersey, United States
2015	4 October	Chicago, United States
2016	2 October	Los Angeles, United States
2017	15 September	Los Angeles, United States
2018 (2019)	11–13 January 2019	Rio de Janeiro, Brazil
2019	19–22 September 2019	São Paulo, Brazil
2021	2–6 June, 2021	Rome, Italy
2022	cancelled	~~Rio de Janeiro, Brazil~~
2022 (2023)	29 January–5 February 2023	(United Arab Emirates) Sharjah, UAE
2023	13–17 December 2023	Tokyo, Japan
2024	7–14 September	Rome, Italy
2025	cancelled	~~Washington, D.C., United States~~
2025 (2026)	1–8 March 2026	São Paulo, Brazil
2026	14–18 October	Asunción, Paraguay

=== Medalists ===
==== Men ====
Year	Gold	Silver	Bronze
2010	Nyjah Huston (USA)	Shane O'Neill (AUS)	Sean Malto (USA)
2011	Sean Malto (USA)	Nyjah Huston (USA)	Chris Cole (USA)
2012	Nyjah Huston (USA) (2)	Chris Cole (USA)	Chaz Ortiz (USA)
2013	Chris Cole (USA)	Nyjah Huston (USA)	Luan Oliveira (BRA)
2014	Nyjah Huston (USA) (3)	Torey Pudwill (USA)	Ishod Wair (USA)
2015	Kelvin Hoefler (BRA)	Nyjah Huston (USA)	Luan Oliveira (BRA)
2016	Shane O'Neill (AUS)	Nyjah Huston (USA)	Cody McEntire (USA)
2017	Nyjah Huston (USA) (4)	Shane O'Neill (AUS)	Kelvin Hoefler (BRA)
2018 (2019)	Nyjah Huston (USA) (5)	Kelvin Hoefler (BRA)	Felipe Gustavo (BRA)
2019	Nyjah Huston (USA) (6)	Yuto Horigome (JPN)	Gustavo Ribeiro (POR)
2021	Yuto Horigome (JPN)	Nyjah Huston (USA)	Sora Shirai (JPN)
2022 (2023)	Aurélien Giraud (FRA)	Gustavo Ribeiro (POR)	Ginwoo Onodera (JPN)
2023	Sora Shirai (JPN)	Kairi Netsuke (JPN)	Yuto Horigome (JPN)
2024	Toa Sasaki (JPN)	Matías Dell Olio (ARG)	Jhancarlos González (COL)
2025 (2026)	Toa Sasaki (JPN) (2)	Ángelo Caro (PER)	Sora Shirai (JPN)
2026	Ginwoo Onodera (JPN)	Juni Kang (KOR)	Taiga Nagai (JPN)

==== Women ====
Year	Gold	Silver	Bronze
2015	Letícia Bufoni (BRA)	Vanessa Torres (USA)	Alana Smith (USA)
2016	Lacey Baker (USA)	Letícia Bufoni (BRA)	Alexis Sablone (USA)
2017	Lacey Baker (USA) (2)	Letícia Bufoni (BRA)	Mariah Duran (USA)
2018 (2019)	Aori Nishimura (JPN)	Letícia Bufoni (BRA)	Lacey Baker (USA)
2019	Pamela Rosa (BRA)	Rayssa Leal (BRA)	Aori Nishimura (JPN)
2021	Aori Nishimura (JPN) (2)	Momiji Nishiya (JPN)	Rayssa Leal (BRA)
2022 (2023)	Rayssa Leal (BRA)	Chloe Covell (AUS)	Momiji Nishiya (JPN)
2023	Yumeka Oda (JPN)	Rayssa Leal (BRA)	Momiji Nishiya (JPN)
2024	Rayssa Leal (BRA) (2)	Momiji Nishiya (JPN)	Miyu Ito (JPN)
2025 (2026)	Ibuki Matsumoto (JPN)	Nanami Onishi (JPN)	Coco Yoshizawa (JPN)
2026	Yumeka Oda (JPN) (2)	Chloe Covell (AUS)	Coco Yoshizawa (JPN)

== Vert skateboarding ==
=== Editions ===
Year	Dates	City and host country
2022	November	Buenos Aires, Argentina
2024	3–6 September	Rome, Italy
2026	1–3 October	Asunción, Paraguay

=== Medalists ===
==== Men ====
Year	Gold	Silver	Bronze
2022	Edi Damestoy (FRA)	Gui Khury (BRA)	Augusto Akio (BRA)
2024	Gui Khury (BRA)	Augusto Akio (BRA)	Collin Graham (USA)
2026	Justin-Daniel "JD" Sánchez (USA)	Gui Khury (BRA)	Hudson Walker (AUS)

==== Women ====
Year	Gold	Silver	Bronze
2022	Yurin Fujii (JPN)	Asahi Kaihara (JPN)	Lilly Stoephasius (GER)
2024	Arisa Trew (AUS)	Mizuho Hasegawa (JPN)	Asahi Kaihara (JPN)
2026	Mizuho Hasegawa (JPN)	Shuka Kawai (JPN)	Helena Laurino (BRA)

== Medal table ==
Updated after the 2025(2026) World Championships.

Rank	Nation	Gold	Silver	Bronze	Total
1	United States	16	11	15	42
2	Japan	12	13	13	38
3	Brazil	9	15	8	32
4	Australia	2	3	2	7
5	Great Britain	2	0	1	3
6	France	2	0	0	2
7	Spain	1	0	1	2
8	Sweden	1	0	0	1
9	Portugal	0	1	1	2
10	Argentina	0	1	0	1
10	Peru	0	1	0	1
12	Colombia	0	0	1	1
12	Denmark	0	0	1	1
12	Germany	0	0	1	1
12	Italy	0	0	1	1
Totals (15 entries)		45	45	45	135

== See also ==
- World Cup of Skateboarding
- Skateboarding at the Summer Olympics
- X Games
- Street League Skateboarding
- Kimberley Diamond Cup
