= World Cup of Skateboarding =

International skateboarding competition

World Cup Skateboarding (WCS), sometimes referred to as World Cup of Skateboarding, is an international skateboarding organization that hosts the World Championships of Skateboarding series and other skateboard competitions since 1994.

== Overview ==
Focusing on the professional skateboarders, the first WCS championship took place in 1994 in Vancouver. Since 1995, WCS has grown the pro tour from 3 events in Canada and Germany to 25 events (in 2008), that encompass Canada, Germany, the United States, Brazil, the Czech Republic, England, France, Spain, Switzerland, Australia, Malaysia. The organization is based in Soda Springs, California.

== History ==
WCS grew out the existence of the National Skateboard Association. Learning from the mistakes that the skateboard industry made during the NSA years, former NSA President and directors, Don & Danielle Bostick have made a commitment to the skaters in developing and directing skateboard competitions around the globe.

== Venues ==
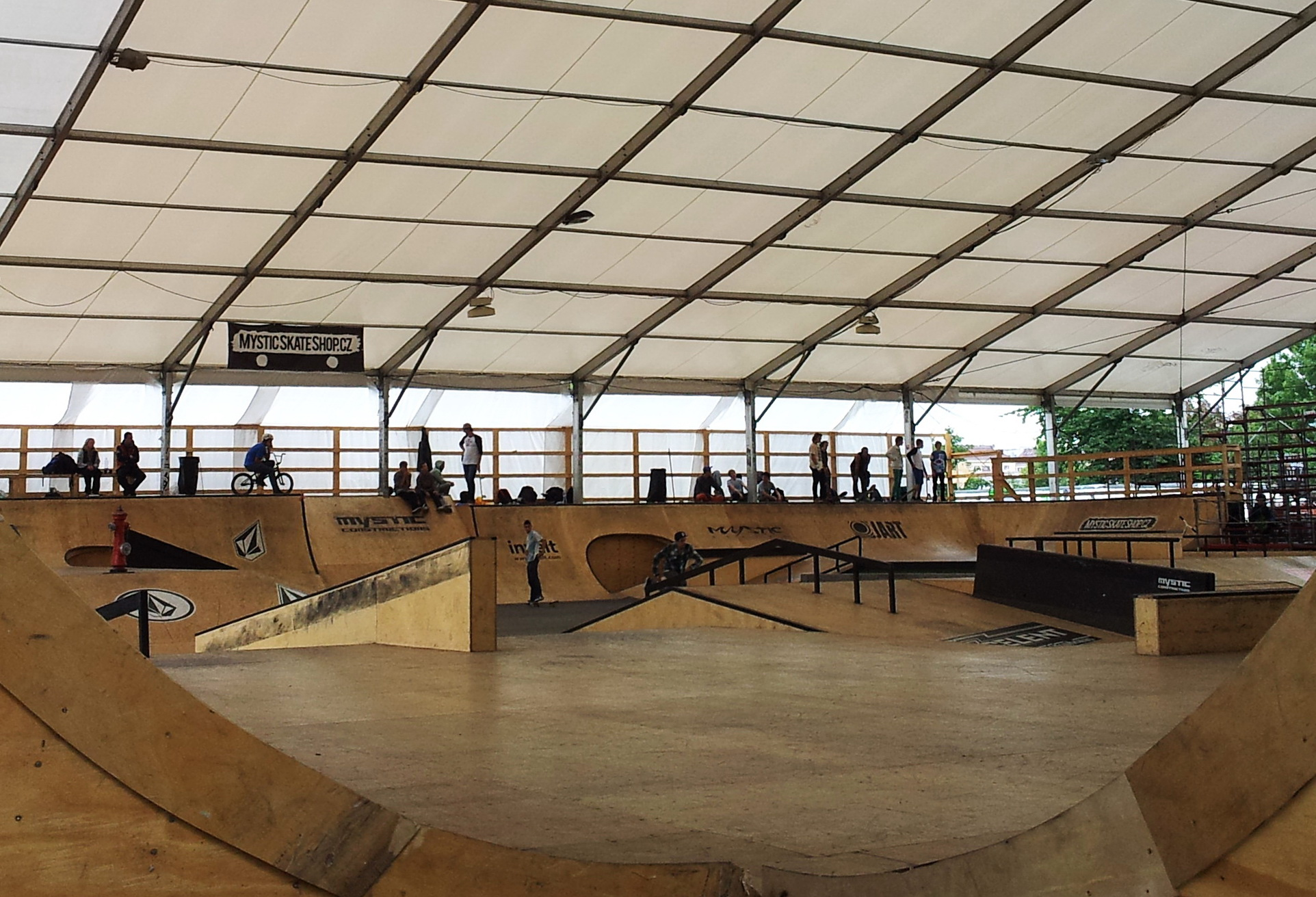
The Mystic Sk8 Cup at Prague's roofed skatepark Štvanice is part of the WCS tour since 1997

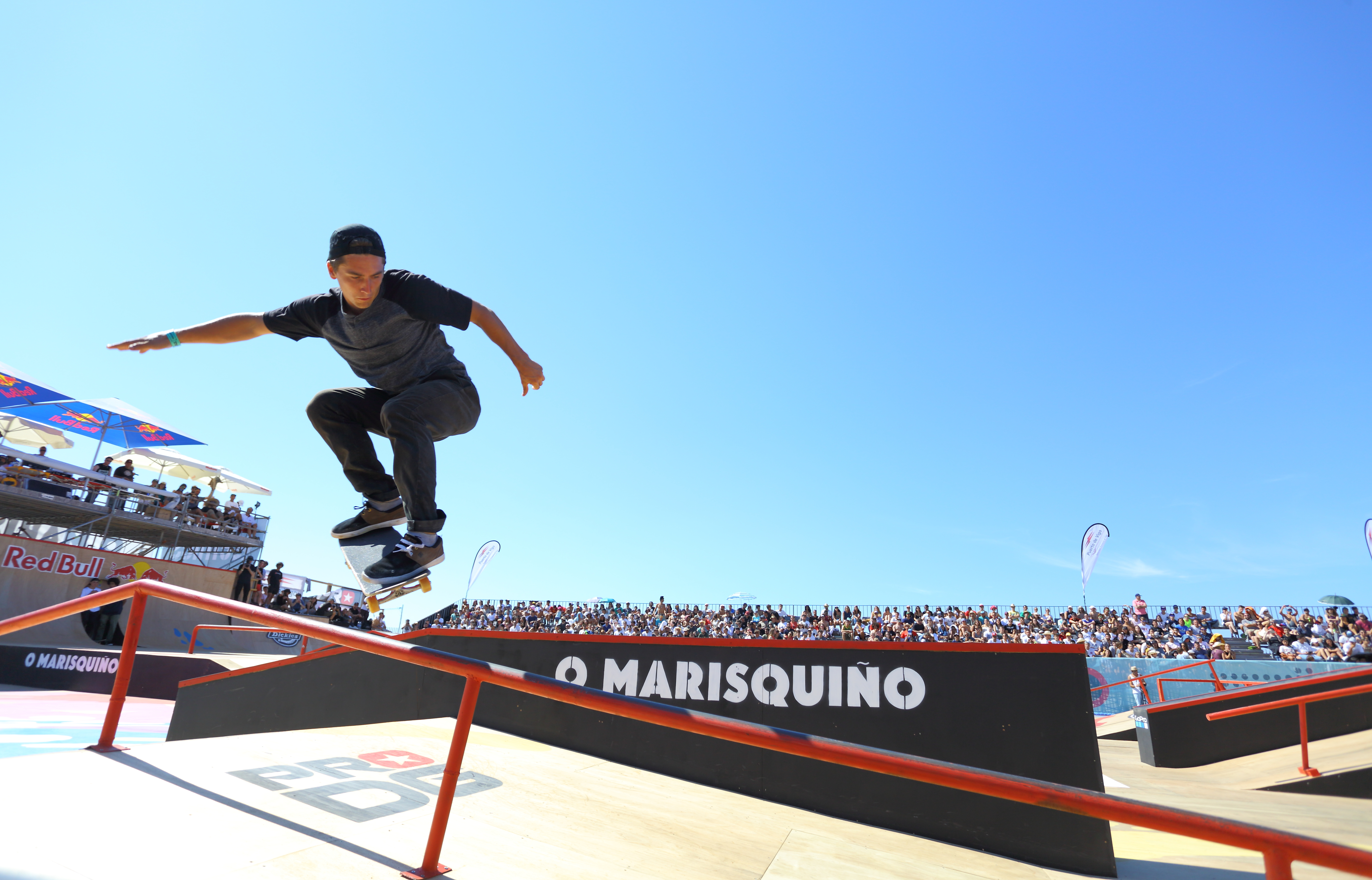
The O Marisquino in Vigo is part of the WCS tour since 2001

Officially recognized World Cup Skateboarding events have in 2018 taken place at these global venues:

- Palm Springs – El Gato Classic
- Tallinn – Simple Session
- Orange – Girls Combi Pool Classic
- Orange – Combi Pool Party
- Paris – Far' N High
- Prague – Mystic Sk8 Cup
- Graz – Graz Skate World Cup
- Vigo – O Marisquino
- Montreal – Jackalope
- Santa Barbara County – Orchid Mini Ramp Holiday
- Rotterdam – RTM Skateboard World Cup
- Moscow – World Cup Moscow
- Breda – World Cup Breda
- Orange – Amateur Combi Pool Classic

Some past venues:

- Bondi Beach – Bowl a Rama Bondi
- Colorado Springs – Rocky Mountain Rampage
- Florianópolis – Skate Generation Brazil
- Fortaleza – Ceara World Cup
- Lake Forest – GVR
- Melbourne – Globe World Cup (this was not part of the World Cup Circuit as of 2006)
- Malmö – Ultra Bowl 5
- Marseille – Sosh Freestyle Cup Marseille
- Münster – Monster Mastership
- Montpellier – FISE
- Newcastle – Australian Bowlriding Championships
- Novo Hamburgo – Qix World Contest
- Ocean City, Maryland – Dew Tour Beach Championships
- Philadelphia – Gravity Games
- Rio de Janeiro – Vert Jam
- San Diego – Exposure
- San Francisco – Dew Tour SF City Championships
- San Jose – Tim Brauch Memorial Comp
- São Paulo – Crail
- Seoul – Asian X Games
- Shepton Mallet – NASS
- Toronto – Canadian Open
- Vancouver – Slam City Jam
- Wellington – Bowl a Rama Wellington

== See also ==
- World Skateboarding Championship
- X Games
- Skateboarding at the Summer Olympics
