= Footedness =

Natural preference of one's left or right foot for various purposes

In human biology, footedness is the natural preference of one's left or right foot for various purposes. It is the foot equivalent of handedness. While purposes vary, such as applying the greatest force in a certain foot to complete the action of kick as opposed to stomping, footedness is most commonly associated with the preference of a particular foot in the leading position while engaging in foot- or kicking-related sports, such as association football and kickboxing. A person may thus be left-footed, right-footed or ambipedal (able to use both feet equally well).

== Ball games ==
In association football, the ball is predominantly struck by the foot. Footedness may refer to the foot a player uses to kick with the greatest force and skill. Most people are right-footed, kicking with the right leg. Capable left-footed players are rare and therefore quite sought after. As rare are "two-footed" players, who are equally capable with both feet. Such players make up only one sixth of players in the top professional leagues in Europe. Two-footedness can be learned, a notable case being England international Tom Finney, but can only be properly developed in the early years. In Australian Rules Football, several players are equally adept at using both feet to kick the ball, such as Sam Mitchell and Charles Bushnell (footballer, retired).

In basketball, it is common for right-handed athletes to have a dominant left leg which they would use when jumping to complete a right-hand layup. Hence, left-handed basketball players tend to use their right leg more as they finish a left handed layup (although both right- and left-handed players are usually able to use both hands when finishing near the basket).

In the National Football League (NFL) placekickers and punters who kick with their left leg are a relative rarity. As of the 2023 NFL season, only four of the league's 32 punters were left-footed. The apparent advantage to punting with the left foot is that, because it is not as common, return specialists are not as experienced handling the ball spinning in the opposite direction. Left-footed placekickers are similarly uncommon.

== Boardsports ==
In boardsports (e.g., surfing, skateboarding and snowboarding), one stands erect on a single, lightweight board that slides along the ground or on water. The need for balance causes one to position the body perpendicular to the direction of motion, with one foot leading the other. As with handedness, when this task is repetitively performed, one tends to naturally choose a particular foot for the leading position.

=== Goofy stance vs. regular stance ===
Boardsport riders are "footed" in one of two stances, generally called "regular" and "goofy". Riders will generally quickly choose a preferred stance that becomes permanently preferred. A "regular" stance indicates the left foot leading on the board with the right foot pushing, while a "goofy" stance leads with the right foot on the board, pushing with the left. Professionals seem to be evenly distributed between the stances. Practice can yield a high level of ambidexterity between the two stances, such that even seasoned participants of a boardsport have difficulty discerning the natural footedness of an unfamiliar rider in action.

To increase the difficulty, variety, and aesthetic value of tricks, riders can ride "switch stance" (abbreviated to "switch"). For example, a goofy-footed skateboarder normally performs an ollie with the right foot forward, but a "switch ollie" would have the rider standing with the left foot at the front of the board. In sports where switch riding is common and expected, like street skateboarding, riders have the goal of appearing natural at, and performing the same tricks in, both regular and goofy stances. Some sports like kitesurfing and windsurfing generally require the rider to be able to switch stance depending on the wind or travel direction rather than rider preference. Each time direction is changed, the stance changes. Snowboarders who ride switch may adopt a "duck stance", where the feet are mounted turned out, or pointed away from the mid-line of the body, typically at a roughly 15-degree angle. In this position, the rider will have the leading foot facing forward in either regular or switch stance.

=== Switch, fakie and nollie ===
When a rider rolls backwards, this is called "riding fakie". A "fakie" trick is performed while riding backwards but taking off on the front foot. Although it is the same foot that jumps in one's traditional stance, it is normally the back foot. A rider can also land in the fakie position.

While there are some parallels between switch stance and fakie, riding switch implies opening the shoulders more to face the direction headed, though not as much as in traditional stance, while fakie stance implies a slightly more backwards facing, closed shoulder posture.

Nollie (nose ollie) is when the front foot takes off when one is riding in their normal stance, the same foot that jumps when doing tricks switch. In nollie position, the body and shoulders are facing forward as much as when riding in normal stance. Generally fakie and normal are done off the tail, whereas nollie and switch are done off the nose.

In skateboarding, most tricks that are performed riding backwards — with respect to the rider's preferred stance — are exclusively categorized as "switch" (in a switch stance) or as fakie, with the general rule that tricks off the tail are almost always described as fakie, and those off the nose are nollie. For example, a jump using the tail rolling backwards is a "fakie ollie" (not a "switch nollie"), and a jump off the nose is a "nollie" (not a "switch fakie").

==== Mongo foot ====
Mongo foot refers to the use of the rider's front foot for pushing. Normally, a skateboarder will feel more comfortable using their back foot to push, while their front foot remains on the board. In the minority case of mongo-footed skateboarders, the opposite is true. Some skateboarders who do not push mongo in their regular stance may still push mongo when riding in switch stance, rather than push with their weaker back foot. Some well-known skaters who change between mongo and normal when pushing switch include Jacob Vance, Stevie Williams, and Eric Koston.

Although its origins remain uncertain, it is widely believed that the term derives from the pejorative use of "mongoloid".

== BMX ==
In BMX, there is a de facto relationship between footedness and preferences of grinding position and of mid-air turning direction. The terms "regular" and "goofy" do not indicate a foot preference as in boardsports, but rather whether the rider's footedness has the usual relationship with their grinding and mid-air turning preferences. For example, consider the following classes of riders:

- right-footed riders who prefer turning counter-clockwise in the air, and grinding on their right
- left-footed riders who prefer turning clockwise in the air, and grinding on their left.

Both classes are of equal size and would be considered "regular". "Goofy" would describe riders whose trick preferences do not match their footedness: a rider who prefers to grind on the opposite side as do most is considered a "goofy grinder"; one who prefers to turn the opposite direction in mid-air as do most is considered a "goofy spinner". Few riders have either goofy trait, but some riders may have both.

== See also ==
- Handedness
- Laterality
- Orthodox stance
- Southpaw stance
- Surefootedness
