= 2011 Rally America season =

Seasons
- ← 2010 2012 →

The 2011 Rally America season was the seventh season of Rally America. The season consisted of 6 rallies and began on January 29, with the Sno*Drift National Rally in Michigan. It was the first rally won by a Super Production Car in Rally America's history. At the end of the season Rally Car sold the rights to Rally American to investors who changed the series name back to Rally America.

On May 1, 2011, Rally America had their first fatal accident since the takeover from SCCA driver Matthew Marker went off the course, slid down an embankment and hit a tree.

== Schedule ==
Dates	Rally	Open Winner	SP Winner	2WD Winner
28–29 January	Sno*Drift	Travis Hanson	Travis Hanson	Dillon Van Way
25–26 February	Rally in the 100 Acre Wood	Antoine L'Estage	Travis Hanson	Wyatt Knox
30 April – 1 May	Olympus Rally	David Higgins	Travis Hanson	Wyatt Knox
13–15 May	Oregon Trail Rally	David Higgins	Ramana Lagemann	Andrew Comrie-Picard
2–4 June	Susquehannock Trail Performance Rally	David Higgins	Ramana Lagemann	Chris Greenhouse
15–16 July	New England Forest Rally	Antoine L'Estage	Travis Hanson	Christopher Duplessis

== Major entries ==
=== Open ===
Only the top 10 competitors are listed.

Pos	Driver	Car	Year	Points	Wins	Podiums
1	David Higgins	Subaru WRX STi	2011	101	3	5
2	Antoine L'Estage	Mitsubishi Evo	2009	96	2	5
3	Travis Hanson	Subaru WRX STi	2007	82	1	2
4	Dave Mirra	Subaru WRX STi	2011	54	0	2
5	Adam Yeoman	Subaru Impreza	2002	32	0	0
6	Ramana Lagemann	Subaru WRX STi	2011	31	0	2
7	Dillon Van Way	Ford Fiesta	2011	22	0	0
8	Roman Pakos	Subaru WRX STi	2006	19	0	0
9	Lauchlin O'Sullivan	Subaru WRX STi	2007	19	0	0
10	Wyatt Knox	Mazdaspeed 3	2008	19	0	0

=== Super Production ===
Only the top 5 competitors are listed.

Pos	Driver	Car	Year	Points	Wins	Podiums
1	Travis Hanson	Subaru WRX STi	2007	122	4	6
2	Andrew Wickline	Subaru WRX STi	2006	48	0	1
3	Ramana Lagemann	Subaru WRX STi	2011	47	2	2
4	Lauchlin O'Sullivan	Subaru WRX STi	2007	46	0	2
5	Evan Cline	Subaru WRX STi	2005	37	0	1

=== 2 Wheel Drive ===
Only the top 5 competitors are listed.

Pos	Driver	Car	Year	Points	Wins	Podiums
1	Wyatt Knox	Mazdaspeed 3	2008	86	2	3
2	Dillon Van Way	Ford Fiesta	2011	79	1	5
3	Brian Gottlieb	Honda Civic	1989	57	0	2
4	Chris Greenhouse	Plymouth Neon	1995	53	1	3
5	Andrew Comrie-Picard	Scion xD	2011	51	1	2
