= Travis Hanson =

- Nationality: American

Rally America career
- Debut season: 2006
- Current team: Team O'Neil
- Car number: 523

'Travis Hanson' is a rally car driver who competes in the Rally America national rally series across the United States. He is a vehicle dynamics engineer and an instructor with the Team O’Neil Rally School in New Hampshire. he is from Traverse City, MI, but he and team call both Michigan and New Hampshire home as they split a lot of time between the two cities. He is the only driver to win a race outright with a non-open class car.

== Complete Rally America results ==
Year	Car	Class	1	2	3	4	5	6	7	8	9	DC	Points
2006	Subaru Impreza WRX	PGT	Sno*Drift; DNP	Rally in the 100 Acre Wood; DNP	Oregon Trail; DNP	Susquehannock Trail; DNP	Maine Forest; 4	Ojibwe Forests; DNP	Colorado Cog; DNP	LSPR; DNP	Wild West Rally; DNP	12th	12
2007	Subaru Impreza WRX	PGT	Sno*Drift; 2	Rally in the 100 Acre Wood; DNF	Oregon Trail; DNP	Olympus Rally; DNP	Susquehannock Trail; 4	New England Forest Rally; 4	Ojibwe Forests; DNF	Rally Colorado; DNP	LSPR; 2	4th	60
2008	Subaru Impreza WRX	PGT	Sno*Drift; 6	Rally in the 100 Acre Wood; 2	Olympus Rally; DNF	Oregon Trail; DNF	Susquehannock Trail; DNF	New England Forest Rally; DNP	Ojibwe Forests; DNP	Rally Colorado; DNP	LSPR; DNP	9th	28
2009	Subaru Impreza WRX STi	SP	Sno*Drift; DNP	Rally in the 100 Acre Wood; 4	Olympus Rally; 2	Oregon Trail; DNF	Susquehannock Trail; 3	New England Forest Rally; DNF	Ojibwe Forests; DNP	Rally Colorado; DNP	LSPR; DNP	4th	45
2010	Subaru Impreza WRX STi	SP	Sno*Drift; 1	Rally in the 100 Acre Wood; 1	Olympus Rally; DNF	Oregon Trail; 2	Susquehannock Trail; DNF	New England Forest Rally; DNF				4th	64
2011	Subaru Impreza WRX STi	SP	Sno*Drift; 1	Rally in the 100 Acre Wood; 1	Olympus Rally; 2	Oregon Trail; 2	Susquehannock Trail; 2	New England Forest Rally				1st	100
