= 2010 Rally America season =

Seasons
- ← 2009 2011 →

The 2010 Rally America season is the sixth season of Rally America. The season consists of 6 rallies and began on January 29, with the Sno* Drift National Rally in Michigan. They will also be hosting 3 rally-cross competitions in the fall at New Jersey Motor Sports Park. The Rally in the 100 Acre Wood had Ken Block in a Ford Fiesta was the first time in 10 years that Ford has been on the podium. It also marked the first time since 2004 that a Subaru was not on the podium, and the first time in history that a Subaru has not won the championship.

Antoine L'Estage won the Open championship, winning the rallies in Susquehannock and New England to give him an eventual 27-point winning margin over William Bacon. In the other classes, Patrick Moro won the Super Production Championship, and Christopher Duplessis won the championship for 2WD cars.

== Schedule ==
Dates	Rally	Open Winner	SP Winner	2WD Winner
29–30 January	Sno*Drift	Travis Pastrana	Travis Hanson	Christopher Duplessis
26–27 February	Rally in the 100 Acre Wood	Ken Block	Travis Hanson	Christopher Duplessis
24–25 April	Olympus Rally	Travis Pastrana	Ramana Lagemann	Christopher Duplessis
14–16 May	Oregon Trail Rally	Andrew Comrie-Picard	Patrick Moro	Dillon Van Way
4–5 June	Susquehannock Trail Performance Rally	Antoine L'Estage	Ramana Lagemann	Christopher Duplessis
16–17 July	New England Forest Rally	Antoine L'Estage	Ramana Lagemann	Lauchlin O'Sullivan
X Games XVI
Dates	Event	(gold) Gold	(silver) Silver	(bronze) Bronze
30–31 July	Rally Car Racing	Tanner Foust	Brian Deegan	Antoine L'Estage; Andrew Comrie-Picard
30–31 July	Rally Car SuperRally	Tanner Foust	Brian Deegan	Samuel Hübinette
Rallycross events [AWD listed first]
Dates	Event	Pole position	B Final Winner	A Final Winner
28–29 August	NJMP Rallycross #1	Tanner Foust; Josh Wimpey	Christopher Duplessis; Brian Johnston	Tanner Foust; Josh Wimpey
2–3 October	NJMP Rallycross #2	Dave Mirra; Dillon Van Way	Liam Doran; Eric Vlasic	Tanner Foust; Matthew Johnson
6–7 November	NJMP Rallycross #3	Liam Doran; Dillon Van Way	Travis Pastrana; Jordan Guitar	Toomas Heikkinen; Matthew Johnson

== Major entries ==
=== Open ===
Only the top 10 competitors are listed, as well as other well-known racers.

Pos	Driver	Car	Year	Points	Wins	Podiums
1	Antoine L'Estage	Mitsubishi Evo	2009	109	2	6
2	William Bacon	Mitsubishi Evo	2006	82	0	4
3	Travis Pastrana	Subaru WRX STi	2010	46	2	2
4	Ramana Lagemann	Subaru WRX STi	2010	42	0	2
5	Patrick Moro	Subaru WRX STi	2005	39	0	0
6	Andrew Comrie-Picard	Mitsubishi Evo	2010	36	1	1
7	Dave Mirra	Subaru WRX STi	2010	36	0	1
8	Travis Hanson	Subaru WRX STi	2007	25	0	1
9	Joseph Burke	Subaru WRX STi	2008	32	0	0
10	Jimmy Keeney	Subaru WRX STi	2007	31	0	0

=== Super Production ===
This is the top 5 of the current competitors.

Pos	Driver	Car	Points	Wins	Podiums
1	Patrick Moro	Subaru WRX STi	75	1	3
2	Ramana Lagemann	Subaru WRX STi	67	2	3
3	Jimmy Keeney	Subaru WRX STi	65	0	1
4	Travis Hanson	Subaru WRX STi	64	2	3
5	Timothy Rooney	Subaru WRX STi	57	0	3

=== 2 Wheel Drive ===
This is the top 5 of the current competitors.

Pos	Driver	Car	Points	Wins	Podiums
1	Christopher Duplessis	Volkswagen GTI	122	4	6
2	Dillon Van Way	Ford Focus	72	1	4
3	John Conley	Dodge SRT-4	54	0	3
4	Nick Allen	Ford Focus	36	0	1
5	Gary Wiggin	Volkswagen GTI	31	0	1
