= 2009 Rally America season =

Rally season

2009 Rally America

Seasons
- ← 2008 2010 →

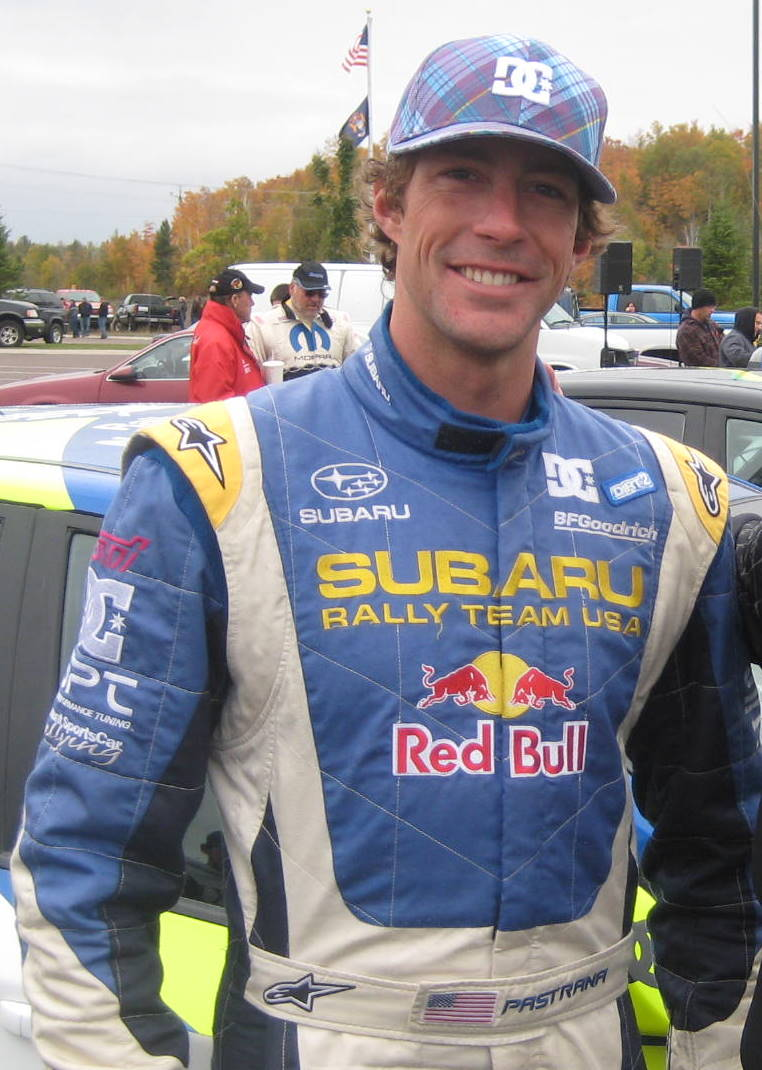
Travis Pastrana claimed his fourth successive title, winning six of the season's nine rallies.

The 2009 Rally America season was the fifth season of Rally America. The season consisted of 9 rallies and began on January 30, with the Sno* Drift National Rally in Michigan. The final stage of Rally in the 100 Acre Wood was canceled due to impassable conditions. With six victories, Travis Pastrana claimed his fourth Rally America championship in succession.

== Schedule ==
Dates	Rally	Winner
30–31 January	Sno*Drift	Travis Pastrana
27–28 February	Rally in the 100 Acre Wood	Ken Block
25–26 April	Olympus Rally	Travis Pastrana
15–17 May	Oregon Trail Rally	Travis Pastrana
5–6 June	Susquehannock Trail Performance Rally	Ken Block
17–18 July	New England Forest Rally	Travis Pastrana
2 August	X Games 15^{†}	Kenny Bräck
28–29 August	Ojibwe Forests Rally	Travis Pastrana
19–20 September	Rally Colorado	Andrew Comrie-Picard
16–17 October	Lake Superior Rally	Travis Pastrana

- † Though not a part of the Rally America season, nearly all competitors will be from Rally America.

=== X Games 15 ===
The X Games had a super stage rally event for their event. This marked 4th time the event was in the X Games, and featured at least 10 drivers from Rally America in head to head competition in a cross over course. 8 of the drivers have already been chosen, including Pastrana, Block, and Foust.

== Driver standings ==
Though Rally America runs 2 other classes, Super Production and Front Wheel Drive, these are not nearly as heavily contested. Travis Pastrana secured his fourth straight championship during the Ojibwe Forests Rally. Foust and Comrie-Picard were unable to attend.

Driver	Car	Year	Class	Points
Travis Pastrana	Subaru Impreza WRX STI	2009	Open	151
Andi Mancin	Mitsubishi Lancer Evo	2007	Open	97
Andrew Comrie-Picard	Mitsubishi Lancer Evo	2009	Open	86
Ken Block	Subaru Impreza WRX STI	2009	Open	80
Tanner Foust	Mitsubishi Lancer Evo	2009	Open	62
William Bacon	Mitsubishi Lancer Evo	2006	Open	48
Mark Fox	Mitsubishi Lancer Evo	2006	Open	47
Patrick Moro	Subaru Impreza WRX STI		Open	45
Arkadiusz Gruszka	Mitsubishi Lancer Evo		Open	43

This is only a list of the top finishers, a full list with details can be seen at the Rally America website.
