= Antoine L'Estage =

Canadian rally driver

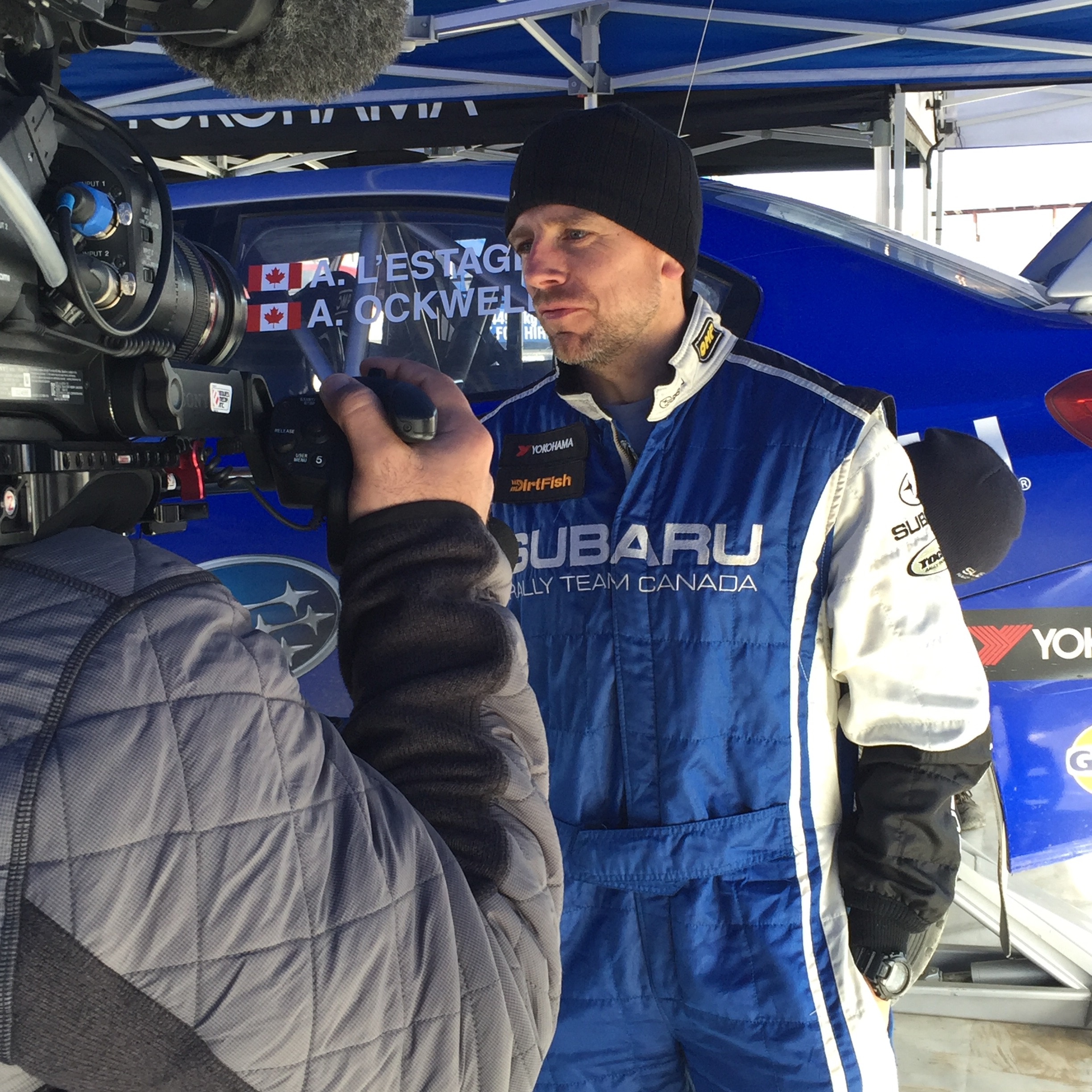
- L'Estage in 2015

Personal information
- Full name: Antoine L'Estage
- Born: February 26, 1973 (age 53) Québec, Canada
- Height: 5"11"

Sport
- Sport: Rally
- Events: X Games, Rally America, Canadian Rally Championship
Medal record
North American Rally Cup Champion x6, Canadian Rally Champion x10, 2010 Rally America Champion

Antoine L'Estage (born February 26, 1973) is a Canadian rally driver. He has won national championships in both the Canada and the USA. He lives in St-Jean-sur-Richelieu, Québec.

== Rally ==
L'Estage was born into the world of rally. As a young boy, he and his siblings would watch their father compete as a driver. He started racing in 1995 at the Rallye de Quebec in regional events. He won Rookie of the year for the 2001 season for the Canadian Rally Championship. He won the Canadian championship in 2006, 2007, and eight in a row from 2010 to 2017, coming second to Patrick Richard in 2004, 2008 and 2009. In 2011, he broke the record of most wins at Défi St-Agathe Rallye (previously set by John Buffum) when he won the event for the sixth time in seven years. In 2014, he became the first seven-time champion as well as the first driver in the history of the CRC to win all six events in the same season.

L'Estage also competed in the USA-based Rally America series from 2006 to 2015. He won the North American Rally Cup in 2007, 2008, and from 2010 to 2014, coming second to Andrew Comrie-Picard in 2009. In 2010, he ended Travis Pastrana's four-year reign over the Rally America championship. He later claimed the North American and the Canadian Rally Championships and secured the Triple Crown for 2010 by winning all three titles in the same year. In 2011 and 2012, L'Estage completed the Rally America series as runner-up behind former British champion David Higgins. In 2013, he rented a MML Sports built WRC-spec Mitsubishi Lancer for the Oregon Trail, resulting in a spectacular crash. He competed three times in Rally Car Racing at X Games. He raced his Hyundai Tiburon for X Games 13, borrowed a Rockstar Energy Subaru for X Games 14, finishing ninth, and then he took his Mitsubishi Evo X to a Bronze medal finish at X Games 16 in 2010. He has also been a test driver on a show in Quebec called Le Guide de l'Auto.

=== Canadian Rally Championship Results ===
As of November 2015, L'Estage became the most successful Canadian rally driver ever, overtaking Taisto Heinonen at 5590 lifetime points, and tying with John Buffum for most wins at 43. L'Estage went on to win four events in the 2016 season on his way to his ninth Canadian Championship, and he was inducted into the Canadian Motorsport Hall of Fame in October 2016.

Year	Car	1	2	3	4	5	6	7	8	9	DC	Points
2001	Eagle Talon	Rallye de Quebec; 5	Rallye Perce-Neige; DNF	Bighorn Rally; DNP	Rocky Mountain Rally; DNP	Rallye Baie Des Chaleurs; 5	Rally of the Voyageurs; DNF	Rally International Charlevoix; DNP	Rally of the Tall Pines; 4		8th	26
2002	Eagle Talon/Hyundai Elantra	Rallye de Quebec; DNF	Rallye Perce-Neige; 4	Bighorn Rally; DNP	Rocky Mountain Rally; DNP	Rallye Baie Des Chaleurs; DNF	Défi St-Agathe; DNF	Rally of the Voyageurs; DNF	Rally International Charlevoix; 5	Rally of the Tall Pines; DNP	8th	18
2003	Hyundai Elantra	Rallye Perce-Neige; 2	Rallye de Quebec; 8	Bighorn Rally; DNF	Rocky Mountain Rally; 4	Pacific Forest Rally; DNP	Rallye Baie Des Chaleurs; DNF	Défi St-Agathe; DNF	Rally of the Tall Pines; 2		5th	46
2004	Subaru Impreza WRX/Hyundai Tiburon	Rallye Perce-Neige; DNP	Rocky Mountain Rally; 3	Rallye Baie Des Chaleurs; DNF	Défi St-Agathe; DNF	Pacific Forest Rally; 2	Rally of the Tall Pines; 1				2nd	47
2005	Hyundai Tiburon	Rallye Perce-Neige; DNF	Rocky Mountain Rally; DNF	Rallye Baie Des Chaleurs; 1	Défi St-Agathe; 1	Pacific Forest Rally; 1	Rally of the Tall Pines; DNF				2nd	60
2006	Hyundai Tiburon	Rallye Perce-Neige; 1	Rocky Mountain Rally; 1	Rallye Baie Des Chaleurs; DNF	Défi St-Agathe; 1	Pacific Forest Rally; 2	Rally of the Tall Pines; 1				1st	106
2007	Hyundai Tiburon	Rallye Perce-Neige; 3	Rocky Mountain Rally; 1	Rallye Baie Des Chaleurs; 1	Défi St-Agathe; 1	Pacific Forest Rally; 1	Rally of the Tall Pines; 1				1st	124
2008	Hyundai Tiburon	Rallye Perce-Neige; 1	Rocky Mountain Rally; DNF	Rallye Baie Des Chaleurs; 3	Défi St-Agathe; DNF	Pacific Forest Rally; 1	Rally of the Tall Pines; DNF				2nd	64
2009	Mitsubishi Evo X	Rallye Perce-Neige; 1	Rocky Mountain Rally; DNF	Rallye Baie Des Chaleurs; 4	Défi St-Agathe; 1	Pacific Forest Rally; 2	Rally of the Tall Pines; 5				2nd	84
2010	Mitsubishi Evo X	Rallye Perce-Neige; 16	Rocky Mountain Rally; 1	Rallye Baie Des Chaleurs; 6	Défi St-Agathe; 1	Pacific Forest Rally; 1	Rally of the Tall Pines; 1				1st	98
2011	Mitsubishi Evo X	Rallye Perce-Neige; 1	Rocky Mountain Rally; 1	Rallye Baie Des Chaleurs; 1	Défi St-Agathe; 1	Pacific Forest Rally; 2	Rally of the Tall Pines; DNF				1st	106
2012	Mitsubishi Evo X	Rallye Perce-Neige; 1	Rocky Mountain Rally; 1	Rallye Baie Des Chaleurs; 1	Défi St-Agathe; 2	Pacific Forest Rally; 1	Rally of the Tall Pines; 2				1st	122
2013	Mitsubishi Evo X	Rallye Perce-Neige; DNF	Rocky Mountain Rally; 1	Rallye Baie Des Chaleurs; 1	Défi St-Agathe; 1	Pacific Forest Rally; 1	Rally of the Tall Pines; 2				1st	106
2014	Mitsubishi Evo X	Rallye Perce-Neige; 1	Rocky Mountain Rally; 1	Rallye Baie Des Chaleurs; 1	Défi St-Agathe; 1	Pacific Forest Rally; 1	Rally of the Tall Pines; 1				1st	132
2015	Subaru WRX STI	Rallye Perce-Neige; 1	Pacific Forest Rally; 1	Rallye Baie Des Chaleurs; 1	Défi St-Agathe; DNF	Rocky Mountain Rally; 1	Rally of the Tall Pines; DNF				1st	90
2016	Subaru WRX STI	Rallye Perce-Neige; DNF	Rocky Mountain Rally; 1	Rallye Baie Des Chaleurs; 13	Défi St-Agathe; 14	Pacific Forest Rally; 1	Rally of the Tall Pines; 1	Big White Winter Rally; 1			1st	92
2017	Subaru WRX STI	Rallye Perce-Neige; DNF	Rocky Mountain Rally; DNF	Rallye Baie Des Chaleurs; 1	Défi St-Agathe; 1	Pacific Forest Rally; 1	Rally of the Tall Pines; 1	Big White Winter Rally; 1			1st	111

=== Complete Rally America results ===
Year	Car	1	2	3	4	5	6	7	8	9	DC	Points
2006	Hyundai Tiburon	Sno*Drift; DNP	Rally in the 100 Acre Wood; DNP	Oregon Trail; DNP	Susquehannock Trail; 5	Maine Forest; DNF	Ojibwe Forests; DNP	Colorado Cog; DNP	LSPR; DNP	Wild West Rally; DNP	29th	11
2007	Hyundai Tiburon	Sno*Drift; DNP	Rally in the 100 Acre Wood; DNP	Oregon Trail; DNP	Olympus Rally; DNP	Susquehannock Trail; DNF	New England Forest Rally; 2	Ojibwe Forests; DNP	Rally Colorado; DNP	LSPR; DNP	15th	18
2008	Hyundai Tiburon	Sno*Drift; 1	Rally in the 100 Acre Wood; DNF	Olympus Rally; DNP	Oregon Trail; DNP	Susquehannock Trail; 1	New England Forest Rally; DNF	Ojibwe Forests; DNP	Rally Colorado; DNP	LSPR; DNP	7th	46
2009	Mitsubishi Evo X	Sno*Drift; DNP	Rally in the 100 Acre Wood; DNF	Olympus Rally; DNP	Oregon Trail; DNP	Susquehannock Trail; 8	New England Forest Rally; 3	Ojibwe Forests; DNP	Rally Colorado; DNP	LSPR; 2	11th	36
2010	Mitsubishi Evo X	Sno*Drift; 2	Rally in the 100 Acre Wood; 2	Olympus Rally; 2	Oregon Trail; 3	Susquehannock Trail; 1	New England Forest Rally; 1				1st	87
2011	Mitsubishi Evo X	Sno*Drift; DNF	Rally in the 100 Acre Wood; 1	Olympus Rally; 2	Oregon Trail; 2	Susquehannock Trail; 2	New England Forest Rally; 1				2nd	96
2012	Mitsubishi Evo X	Sno*Drift; 2	Rally in the 100 Acre Wood; DNF	Oregon Trail; DNF	Susquehannock Trail; 1	New England Forest Rally; 1	Olympus Rally; 3				2nd	77
2013	Mitsubishi Evo X	Sno*Drift; 1	Rally in the 100 Acre Wood; DNF	Oregon Trail; DNF	Susquehannock Trail; DNP	New England Forest Rally; DNF	Ojibwe Forests; DNF	LSPR; 2			5th	43
2014	Mitsubishi Evo X	Sno*Drift; 2	Rally in the 100 Acre Wood; DNF	Oregon Trail; DNP	Susquehannock Trail; DNP	Mt. Washington Hillclimb; DNP	New England Forest Rally; DNP	Ojibwe Forests; DNP	LSPR; DNP		16th	18
2015	Subaru WRX STI	Sno*Drift; DNP	Rally in the 100 Acre Wood; DNP	Oregon Trail; DNP	Olympus Rally; DNF	Susquehannock Trail; DNP	New England Forest Rally; DNP	Ojibwe Forests; DNP	LSPR; DNP		--	--

== See also ==
- Canadian Rally Championship
- Rally America
- Mitsubishi Evo
