= Matt Iorio =

Matt Iorio (Matthew Wallace Iorio) is a Rally driver In North America, and the 2006 North American Rally Champion.

Iorio began competitive driving in 2003. In 2004 he was awarded the SCCA Rookie of the Year. 2005 saw Matt Iorio winning the Rally America Open Class Championship as well as the North American Rally Cup (NARC). In 2005 Iorio graced the podium to win at the Sno*Drift 2005.

In 2006 Iorio was among the 12 drivers selected for the inaugural X Games XII Rally where he finished 8th. Matt had his first overall win at the Susquehannock Trail Performance Rally (STPR), which was regarded as being the most competitive rally in recent history. At the end of 2006 Iorio was once again the NARC Champion.

Matt competed in the 2007 X Games XIII where he traded tenths of seconds with eventual winner, Tanner Foust. He is currently 5th in the Rally America Championship.

Iorio is known for driving the Black and White Paladin Rally Subaru Impreza, but he has also had podium finishes in the Cascade Autosport Mitsubishi Evolution.
