= Nathalie Richard (co-driver) =

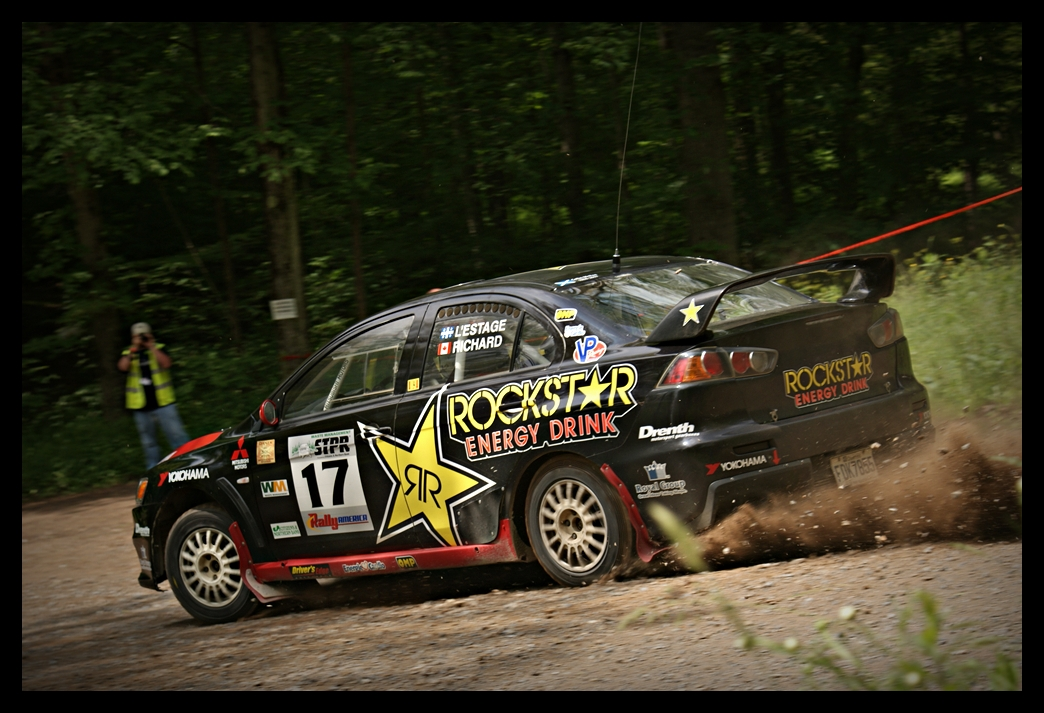
Antoine L'Estage and co-driver Nathalie Richard in their 2009 Mitsubishi Lancer Evo X at the 2010 Susquehannock Trail Performance Rally in Pennsylvania. Round 5 of the 2010 Rally America National Championship.

Nathalie Richard is a Canadian rally co-driver. She was the co-driver for Subaru Rally Team Canada alongside her brother Pat Richard in 2004 & 2005, and later co-drove with Antoine L'Estage over eight seasons (2006 - 2013) before returning to Subaru Rally Team Canada with Martin Rowe. As of 2014, Richard had earned 43 overall national victories in Canada and the US. She is a three-time X Games Rally Car athlete and the most decorated co-driver in North America. In 2020, Richard was inducted into the Canadian Motorsport Hall of Fame.

== Early life ==
Richard was born in Sherbrooke, Quebec, and a few months later, moved to Halifax, Nova Scotia. She speaks both English and French. After graduating with her Bachelor of Commerce from Dalhousie University, she lived in Toronto, Ontario for three years before moving to Australia. There, she received her Graduate Diploma in Education from Wollongong University prior to working in Sydney for several years. Nathalie is a Certified Financial Planner and is President of INSIGHT Wealth Management in her hometown of Halifax.

== Career ==
In 2000, Richard was the manager of her brother Pat's Subaru Rally Team Canada. After filling in occasionally as co-driver, Nathalie became Pat's regular co-driver in 2004 and 2005. Together, they won the Triple Crown in 2004 by winning the Canadian Rally Championship, the SCCA (American) Championship, and the North American Rally Cup in the same year. In 2005, the Richards won the Rally America series (formerly known as the SCCA series) and Nathalie also won the North American Rally Championship. In 2006, the Richard siblings competed in the inaugural Rally competition at the X Games.

In 2006, Richard started co-driving for Antoine L'Estage. Together, the duo won four Canadian national championship titles, six North American titles, and one American title. In 2007, and again in 2009, Richard competed in the X Games with Antoine L'Estage; following that, co-drivers were eliminated from X Games rally competition. In 2009, the pair began competing in a Hyundai Tiburon. In 2010, Richard and L'Estage won the Triple Crown. This was only the second time in history that the Triple Crown has been won. Nathalie won it both times (2004 & 2010). After this successful year, the pair were named as part of the 2010 All-America Auto Racing First Team, voted in by the American Auto Racing Writers and Broadcasters Association. Nathalie was the only female to be voted in. Other members of this 2010 team include Dario Franchitti, Kyle Busch, Will Power, and John Force.

In 2012, Richard and L'Estage were presented with the Gilles-Villeneuve Trophy by Auto Sport Québec. In late 2013, they began driving a Subaru WRX STI before Nathalie reunited with her brother for his last two competitions.

In 2014, Richard co-drove in another Subaru WRX STI with former Production World Rally driver Martin Rowe (Isle of Man) as Subaru Rally Team Canada. The car had been prepared by Pat Richard and his Rocket Rally Racing company.

In 2015 and 2016 Nathalie co-drove for American Ramana Lagermann (in an M-Sport Ford Fiesta R5 and Porsche 911) and Czech George Plsek (Mitsubishi Evo). Most recent competition was in 2019, again with Ramana Lagemann in a throwback to 2004 when both competed for their countries’ respect Subaru Rally Team.

Nathalie Richard was inducted into the Canadian Motorsport Hall of Fame, class of 2020.

== Rally Career Titles ==
- Canadian Rally Champion : 2012, 2011, 2010, 2007, 2004
- SCCA/Rally America Champion : 2010, 2005, 2004
- North American Rally Champion : 2014, 2013, 2012, 2011, 2010, 2009, 2008, 2007, 2005, 2004
- Canadian Ladies Champion : 2014, 2012, 2011, 2020, 2009, 2008, 2007, 2006, 2004

== Television career ==
Richard has hosted several motorsports television shows including the Canadian Rally Championship series on TSN and RDS (French - Reseau des sports), the Rally America series on ESPN, and the Pikes Peak International Hillclimb on The Outdoor Channel.
