= Rally America =

National championship of rallying events in the United States

- Category: Rallying
- Country: United States
- Inaugural season: 2005
- Folded: 2018
- Last Drivers' champion: (United States) Dave Brown (2018)
- Last Teams' champion: Racer Dave Rally Racing
- Official website: rally-america.com/

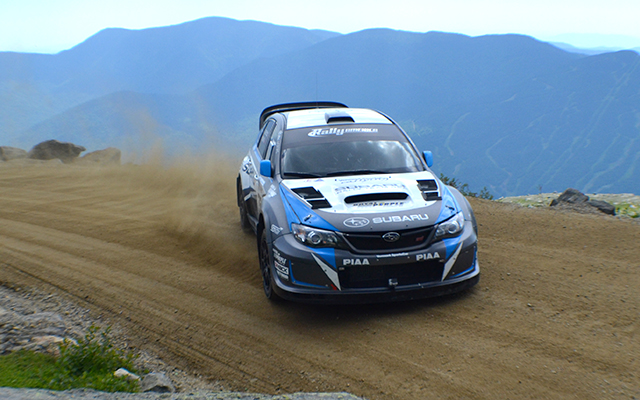
6 times champion David Higgins (pictured in 2014)

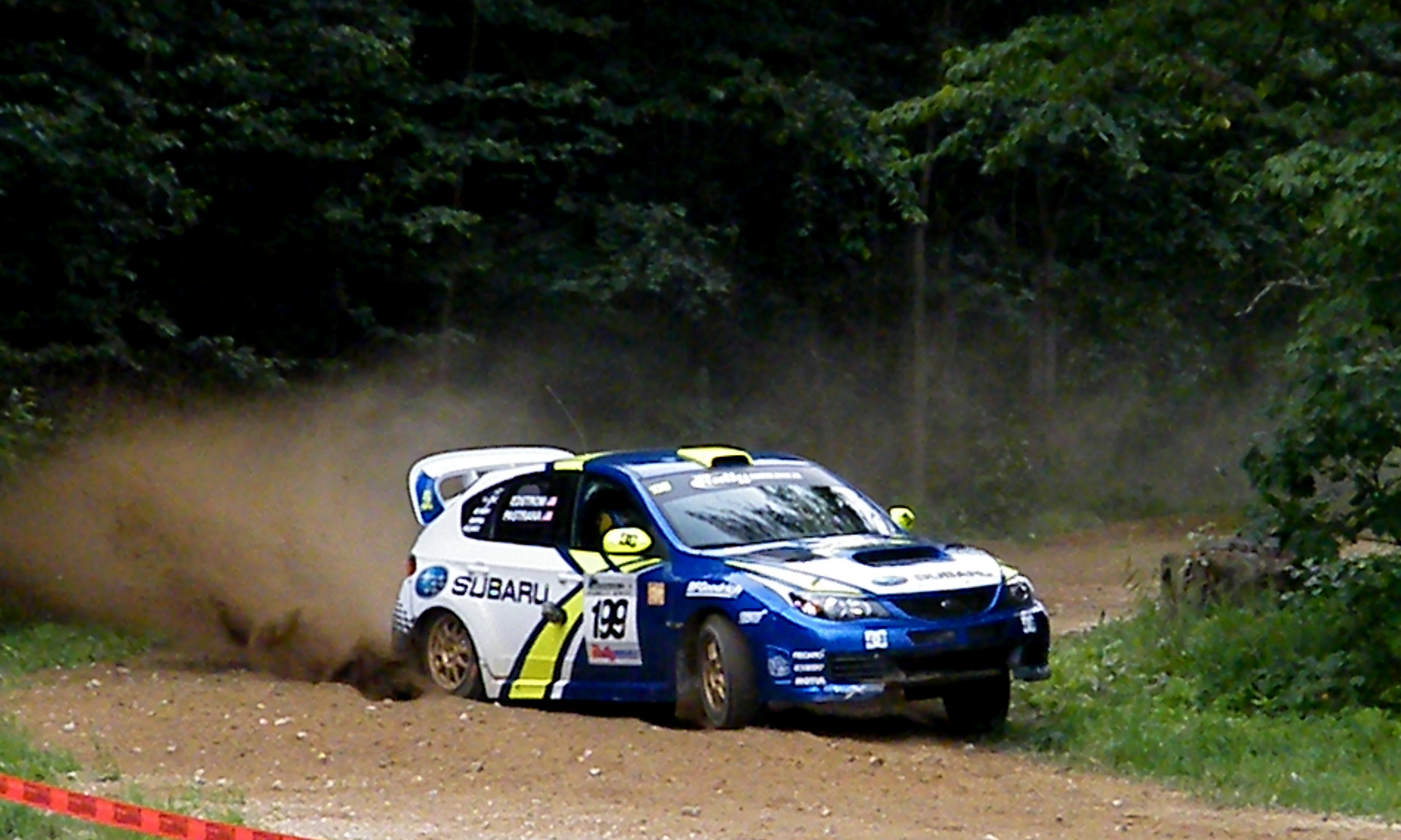
4 times champion Travis Pastrana (pictured in 2010)

The Rally America National Championship was the national championship of rallying events in the United States. The inaugural season was in 2005. Rally America was also the name given to the organization that sanctioned the championship, was briefly rebranded to RallyCar in July 2010, then reverted to Rally America the following year.

== History ==
Rally America was founded in 2002 by CPD Rally Team owner Doug Havir, who provided scoring and reporting services to the Sports Car Club of America's ProRally Championship. The two companies worked in tandem until the end of the 2004 season, when the SCCA withdrew its involvement in U.S. stage rallying. The SCCA then made the decision to sell all commercial and sanctioning rights to Rally America.

In 2005, the inaugural Rally America National Championship was run, incorporating most of the events previously sanctioned by the SCCA. In 2011, Vermont businessman Bill Fogg took over ownership of Rally America from Havir.

With the foundation of the American Rally Association and its National Championship, most of the factory support, top drivers and rally promoters migrated to the new series for the 2017 season. In 2019, Rally America stopped sanctioning rally events and briefly became a media organization with the stated goal of promoting rallying in the United States before pausing all social media posts and shutting down its official website.

=== Rallies previously associated with Rally America ===
Race	Years involved with Rally America
Colorado	2005–2009, 2017–2018
Lake Superior Rally	2005–2009, 2013–2018
Rally Wyoming	2017
Mount Washington Hillclimb Auto Race	2014
New England Forest Rally	2007–2016
Ojibwe Forests Rally	2005–2009, 2013–2016
Olympus Rally	2007–2012, 2015–2016
Oregon Trail Rally	2005–2016
Pikes Peak Int'l Hill Climb	2005
Rally in the 100 Acre Wood	2006–2018
Sno*Drift	2005–2018
Susquehannock Trail Performance Rally	2005–2016
Wild West Rally	2006

== Champions ==
Season	Champion	Car
2005	(Canada) Patrick Richard	Subaru Impreza WRX STI
2006	(United States) Travis Pastrana	Subaru Impreza WRX STI
2007	(United States) Travis Pastrana	Subaru Impreza WRX STI
2008	(United States) Travis Pastrana	Subaru Impreza WRX STI
2009	(United States) Travis Pastrana	Subaru Impreza WRX STI
2010	(Canada) Antoine L'Estage	Mitsubishi Lancer Evolution X
2011	(United Kingdom) David Higgins	Subaru Impreza WRX STI
2012	(United Kingdom) David Higgins	Subaru Impreza WRX STI
2013	(United Kingdom) David Higgins	Subaru Impreza WRX STI
2014	(United Kingdom) David Higgins	Subaru Impreza WRX STI
2015	(United Kingdom) David Higgins	Subaru WRX STi
2016	(United Kingdom) David Higgins	Subaru WRX STi
2017	(Poland) Arkadiusz Gruszka	Mitsubishi Mirage R5
2018	(United States) Dave Brown	Subaru 2.5 RS

== Event winners ==
Drivers
	Driver	Total
1	(United Kingdom) David Higgins	26
2	(United States) Travis Pastrana	19
3	(United States) Ken Block	16
4	(Canada) Antoine L'Estage	9
5	(Canada) Patrick Richard	4
6	(Canada) Andrew Comrie-Picard	3
6	(Australia) Andrew Pinker	3
8	(United States) Dave Brown	2
8	(United States) Ramana Lagemann	2
8	(Sweden) Stig Blomqvist	2
11	(Republic of Ireland) Burke Seamus	1
11	(Poland) Fetela Piotr	1
11	(France) Stephan Verdier	1
11	(United States) Paul Choiniere	1
11	(United States) Travis Hanson	1
11	(United Kingdom) Niall McShea	1
11	(United States) Matt Iorio	1

Manufacturers
	Constructor	Total
1	(Japan) Subaru	67
2	(Japan) Mitsubishi	13
3	(United States) Ford	8
4	(South Korea) Hyundai	3

Cars
	Car	Total
1	Subaru Impreza WRX	67
2	Mitsubishi Lancer Evolution	13
3	Ford Fiesta	7
4	Hyundai Tiburon	3
5	Ford Escort Cosworth	1
5	Subaru Impreza	1

== Points ==
The points are awarded based on final position, as well as achieving a point for starting the race and one point for finishing the race. Thus, finishing a race will automatically earn the driver three points: one for starting, one for finishing, and one for coming in 10th+ place.

Position	1st	2nd	3rd	4th	5th	6th	7th	8th	9th	10th+
Points	20	15	12	10	8	6	4	3	2	1

== Manufacturers ==
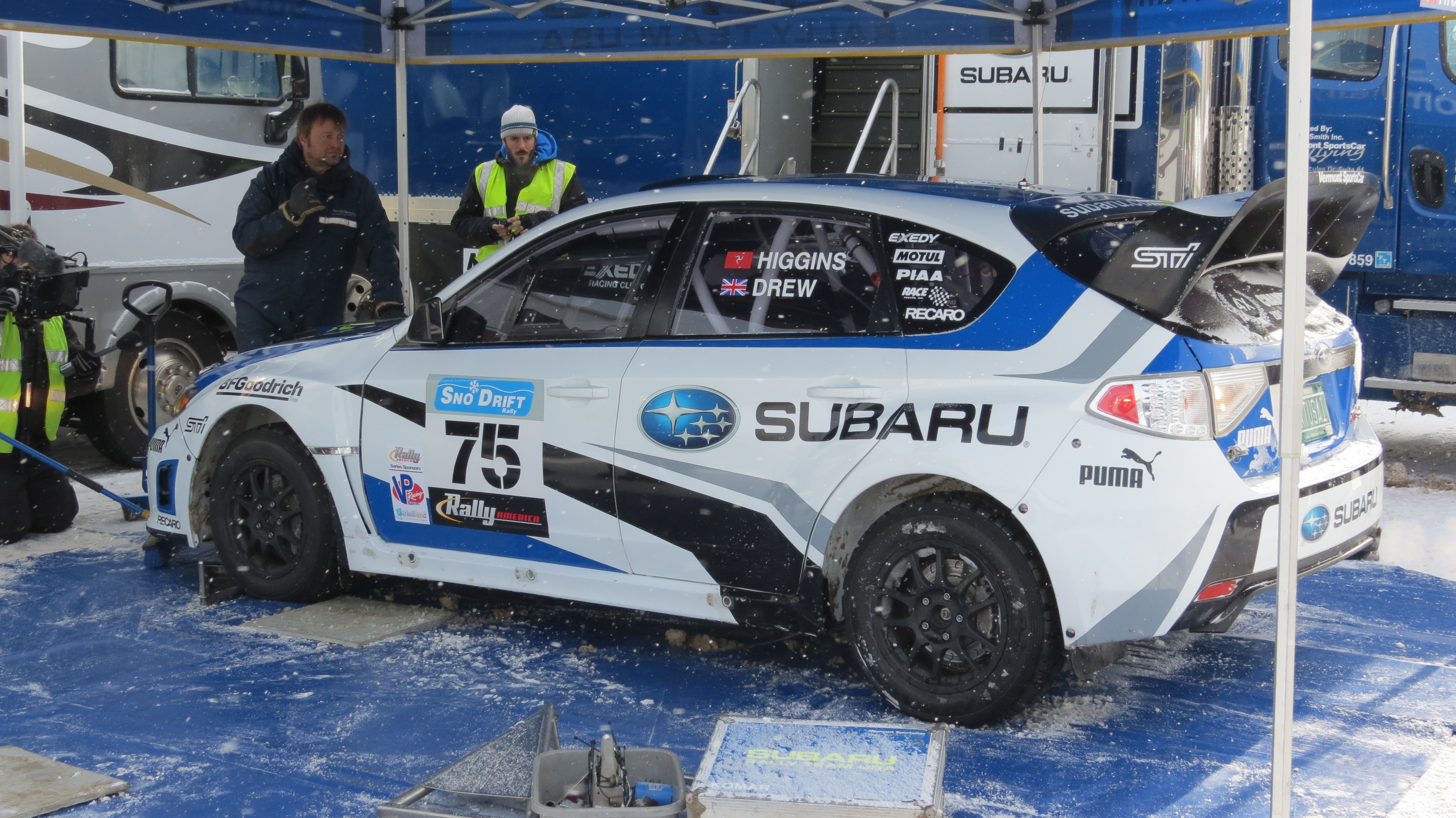
Subaru Impreza WRX STi at the 2013 Sno*Drift Rally

Rally America did not maintain manufacturer scoring or provide recognition for vehicle successes. Most cars are selected by their drivers or teams with the vast majority being entered without any special involvement by their manufacturers.

=== Subaru ===
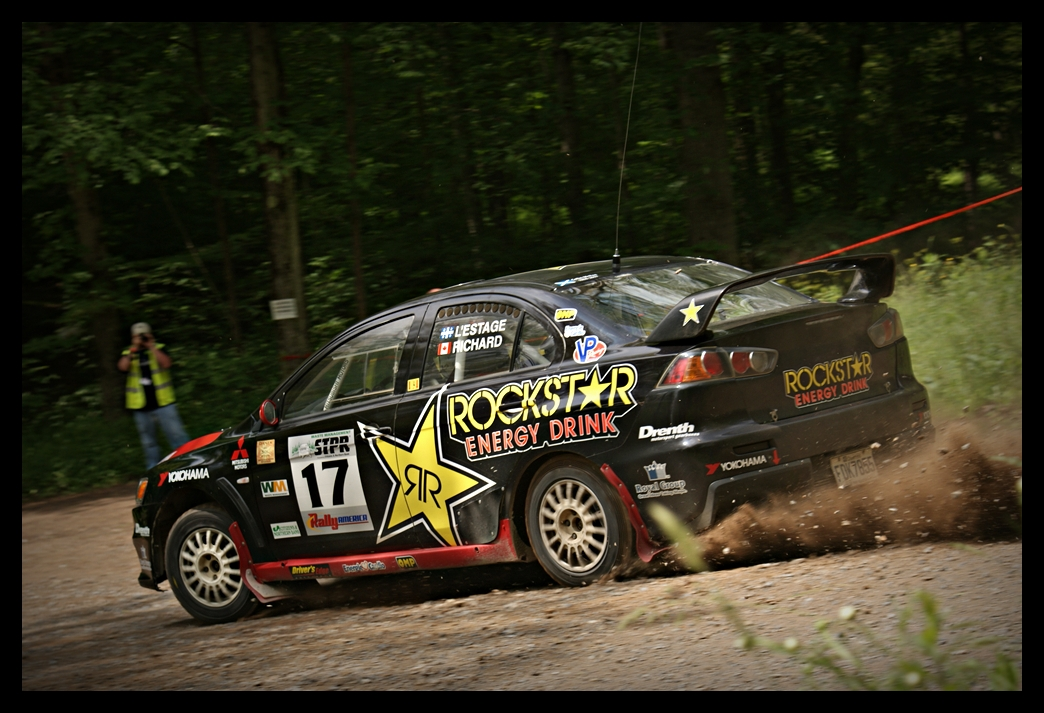
Antoine L'Estage driving a Mitsubishi Lancer Evo X in 2010

Subaru was an integral part of Rally America from its inception. The Subaru WRX STi version of the Impreza vehicle, had already become the most numerous competitive rally car in North America. Subaru became a sponsor of the series and many prizes and other incentives were provided by the company both for rally in general, and Subaru driving teams in particular. A fully stocked parts truck was dispatched to all national events, offering Subaru teams unique access to parts and expertise on scene. There were discounts on parts for teams using Subaru Rally Team USA parts.

=== Mitsubishi ===
Mitsubishi was Subaru's primary competitor in North America, with its Mitsubishi Lancer Evolution series of cars. In the hands of competitive drivers, the Evo proved a challenge to the larger quantity of WRXs, often edging into top three finishes.

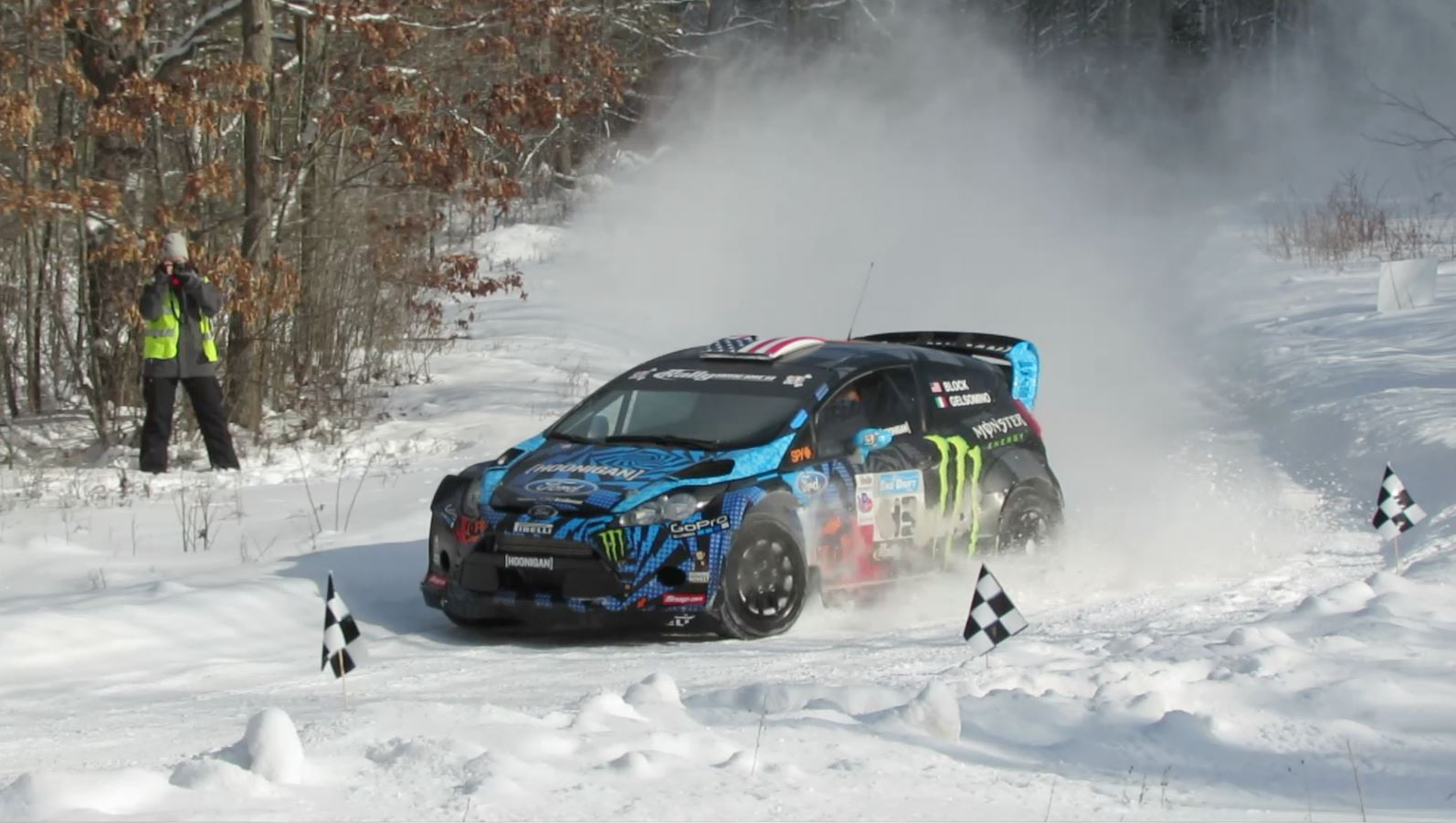
Ken Block driving a Ford Fiesta at the 2012 Sno*Drift Rally

=== Ford ===
Ford Motor Company has had a long history in rallying item rallycross both World Rally Championship and in North America. Ford made a unique appearance in American rallying at the 2009 X Games. Driven by Tanner Foust, Ken Block and Brian Deegan, three open-class Ford Fiestas were dominant (two of the three claimed podium positions) throughout the weekend. Block, the eventual winner, praised the car, while Foust has said he would like to see a factory-backed Ford Racing team competing regularly in Rally America. For 2010, Ford announced that they would be sponsoring a Fiesta in Rally America and the X-Games.

=== Volkswagen ===
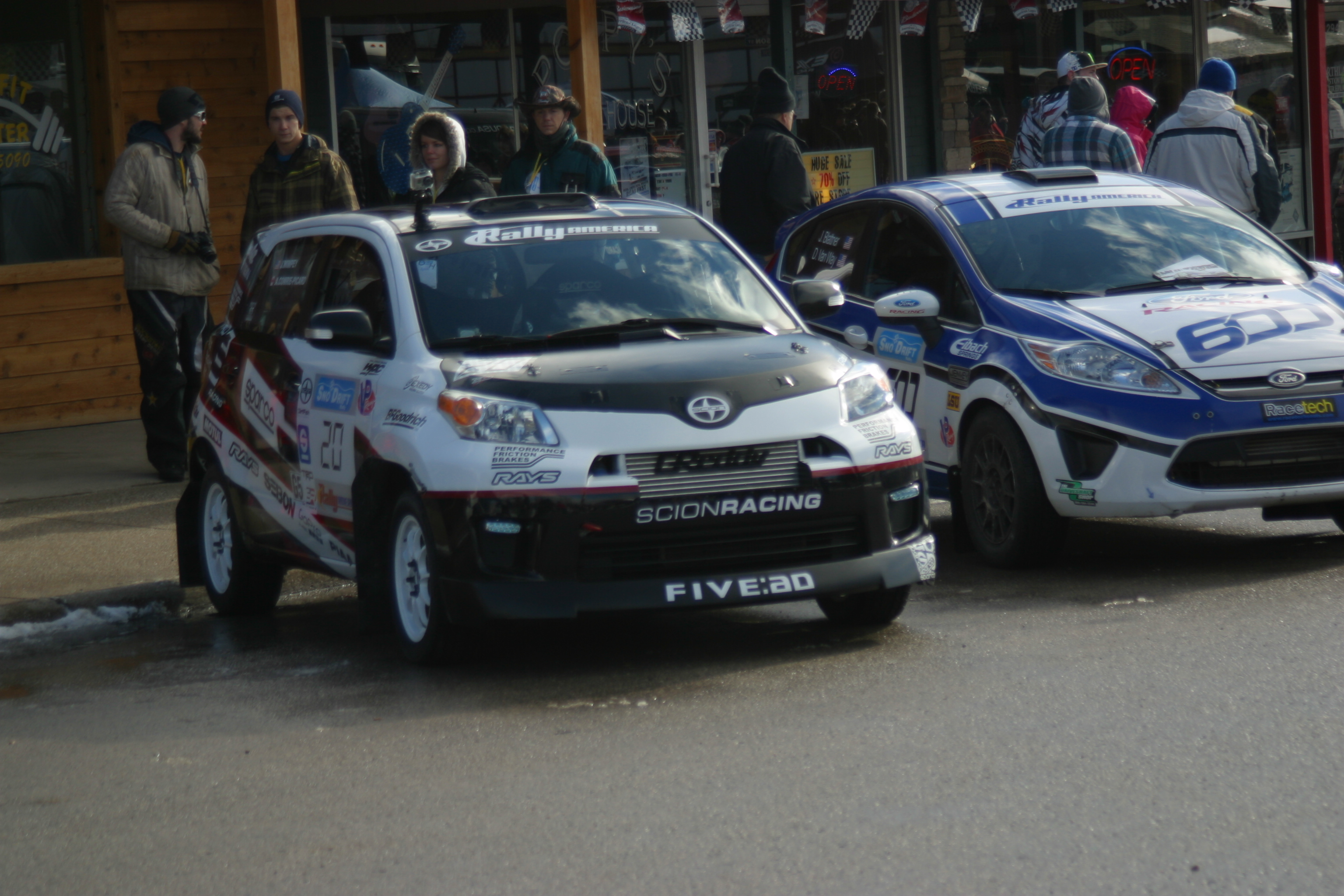
Scion xD at the 2012 Sno*Drift Rally

While not often contending for top overall spots they were utilized by competitors for contesting the two-wheel-drive championships and for beginners. The Volkswagen Jetta, Volkswagen Golf and Volkswagen Beetle mainly had appearances in Rally America events.

=== Scion ===
The Scion Rally xD debuted in the two-wheel-drive category at the 2010 Oregon Trail Rally with Christopher Duplessis at the wheel. In 2011, Duplessis switched to a Ford, and the Scion xD was piloted by Andrew Comrie-Picard.

== Groups ==
In 2009, Rally America narrowed down the number of championships. The regional rallies have many categories split into two events, such as 2 Wheel Drive being split into a separate championship for Group 2 and Group 5, as well as the addition of an Open Light. A list of the full rules can be seen at the Rally America website.

=== Open ===
The engine is turbo charged and must be based on a production engine with the power being limited by the use of an inlet restrictor. The body must be recognizable as the original car. There is a minimum weight also enforced dependent on the engine.

=== Open Lite ===
2.5L or less naturally aspirated 4WD production vehicles with no minimum weight. Like the open class the body must be recognizable as the original car.

=== Super Production ===
The chassis generation must match the appearance and modifications of the car. Thus, one can take a chassis from a 2006 Subaru WRX and put a 2003 WRX shell around it, but all parts must be allowable for a 2003 WRX. Engine displacement cannot be more than 2.6 liter with multipliers, and a limiter is placed on any forced induction system. A minimum weight is also enforced. Many other parts can be replaced, as long as they are an option from the manufacturer.

=== 2 Wheel Drive ===
These are based on the old FIA Group 5 and Group 2 standards. Both are limited on weight, displacement, and must be based on cars with a production of 1000 per year. Power may be sent to either the rear wheels or the front wheels.
