= American Rally Association =

Auto racing sanctioning body for North American rally racing

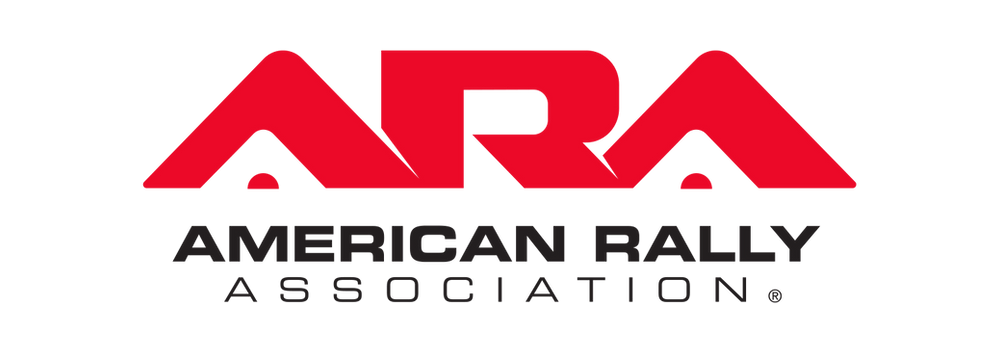
- Sport: Auto Racing
- Category: Rally Racing
- Jurisdiction: United States
- Abbreviation: ARA
- Founded: 2016
- Affiliation: United States Auto Club
- Affiliation date: 2017
- President: Doug Shepard

Official website
- americanrallyassociation.org

The American Rally Association is a stage rallying sanctioning body in the United States. The organization was founded by Tim O'Neil, Martin Headland, and Chris Cyr of Team O'Neil Rally School in 2016, and sanctions the ARA National Rally Championship, which is the lone top-level national rally championship in the United States since the demise of Rally America after the 2018 season. It is a subsidiary of the United States Auto Club.

== Sanctioned events ==
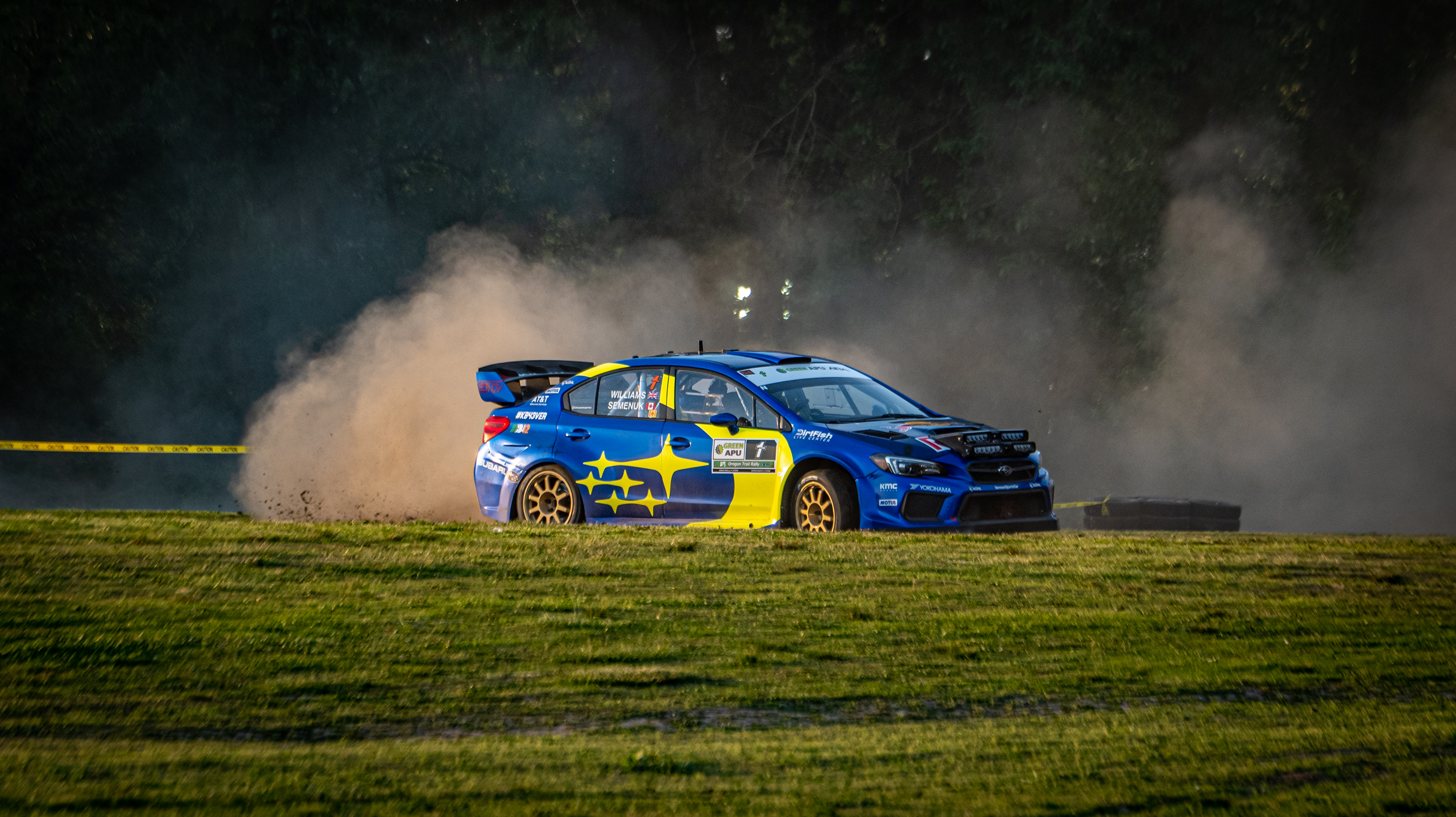
2022 and 2023 National champion Brandon Semenuk at the 2023 Oregon Trail Rally

The ARA sanctions all of the events in the ARA National Rally Championship calendar. They also sanction many regional rally events that are classified into three categories; National, Super Regional, and Regional.

=== ARA National Championship events ===
2026 American Rally Association National Championship calendar
Round	Rally name	Location	Date	Stages	Distance
1	Sno*Drift Rally	Atlanta, Michigan	February 6–7	16	108.39 miles (174.44 km)
2	Rally in the 100 Acre Wood	Salem/Potosi, Missouri	March 13–14	13	125.67 miles (202.25 km)
3	Olympus Rally	Shelton, Washington	April 17–19	18	203.9 miles (328.1 km)
4	Southern Ohio Forest Rally	Chillicothe, Ohio	June 11–13	20	119.96 miles (193.06 km)
5	Rally Colorado	Rangely, Colorado	July 18–19	13	137.39 miles (221.11 km)
6	Ojibwe Forests Rally	Detroit Lakes, Minnesota	August 27–29	16	125.30 miles (201.65 km)
7	Overmountain Rally Tennessee	Newport, Tennessee	September 18–19	13	99.87 miles (160.73 km)
8	Lake Superior Performance Rally	Marquette, Michigan	October 9–10	16	123.07 miles (198.06 km)

=== Super Regional events ===
2026 American Rally Association Super Regional events calendar
Rally name	Location	Date	Regional designation	Notes
Ridge Rally	Tehachapi, California	December 6–7, 2025	West	
Oregon Trail Rally	Goldendale, Washington and Dufur, Oregon	May 16–17	West	Was round 4 of the 2025 National Championship
Susquehannock Trail Performance Rally	Wellsboro, Pennsylvania	July 9–11	East	
The Boone Forest Rally	McKee, Kentucky	July 25	East	

=== Regional events ===
2026 American Rally Association Regional events calendar
Rally name	Location	Date	Regional designation	Notes
Nemadji Trail Rally	Duquette, Minnesota	December 6, 2025	Central	
Prescott Rally	Prescott, Arizona	March 27–28	West	
Headwaters Regional Rally	Detroit Lakes, Minnesota	May 16	Central	
Missouri Ozark Rally	Steelville, Missouri	July 11	Central	
Tour de Forest Rally	Shelton, Washington	October 3	West	
Show Me Rally	Potosi, Missouri	November 6	Central	

=== Previous events ===
- Summer Sno*Drift (East)
- Bristol Forest Rally (East)
- Nemadji Trail Rally (Central 2024)
- Rally Nevada (West)
- Oregon Regional Rally (West)
- New England Forest Rally (National/East)

== Champions ==
Season	Champion	Car	Team
2017	(United States) Travis Pastrana	Subaru WRX STI 17	Subaru Rally Team USA
2018	(United Kingdom) David Higgins	Subaru WRX STI 18	Subaru Rally Team USA
2019	(United Kingdom) David Higgins	Subaru WRX STI 19	Subaru Motorsports USA
2020	(Republic of Ireland) Barry McKenna	Škoda Fabia R5; Ford Fiesta R5; Ford Fiesta S2000	
2021	(United States) Travis Pastrana	Subaru WRX STI 20	Subaru Motorsports USA
2022	(Canada) Brandon Semenuk	Subaru WRX STI 20	Subaru Motorsports USA
2023	(Canada) Brandon Semenuk	Subaru WRX ARA24	Subaru Motorsports USA
2024	(Canada) Brandon Semenuk	Subaru WRX ARA24	Subaru Motorsports USA
2025	(Canada) Brandon Semenuk	Subaru WRX ARA25	Subaru Motorsports USA
2026	(United States) Seth Quintero	Toyota GR Corolla RC2	Toyota Gazoo Racing WRT
