= Sno*Drift =

Annual rally competition in Michigan

Coordinates: 45°0′17″N 84°8′38″W

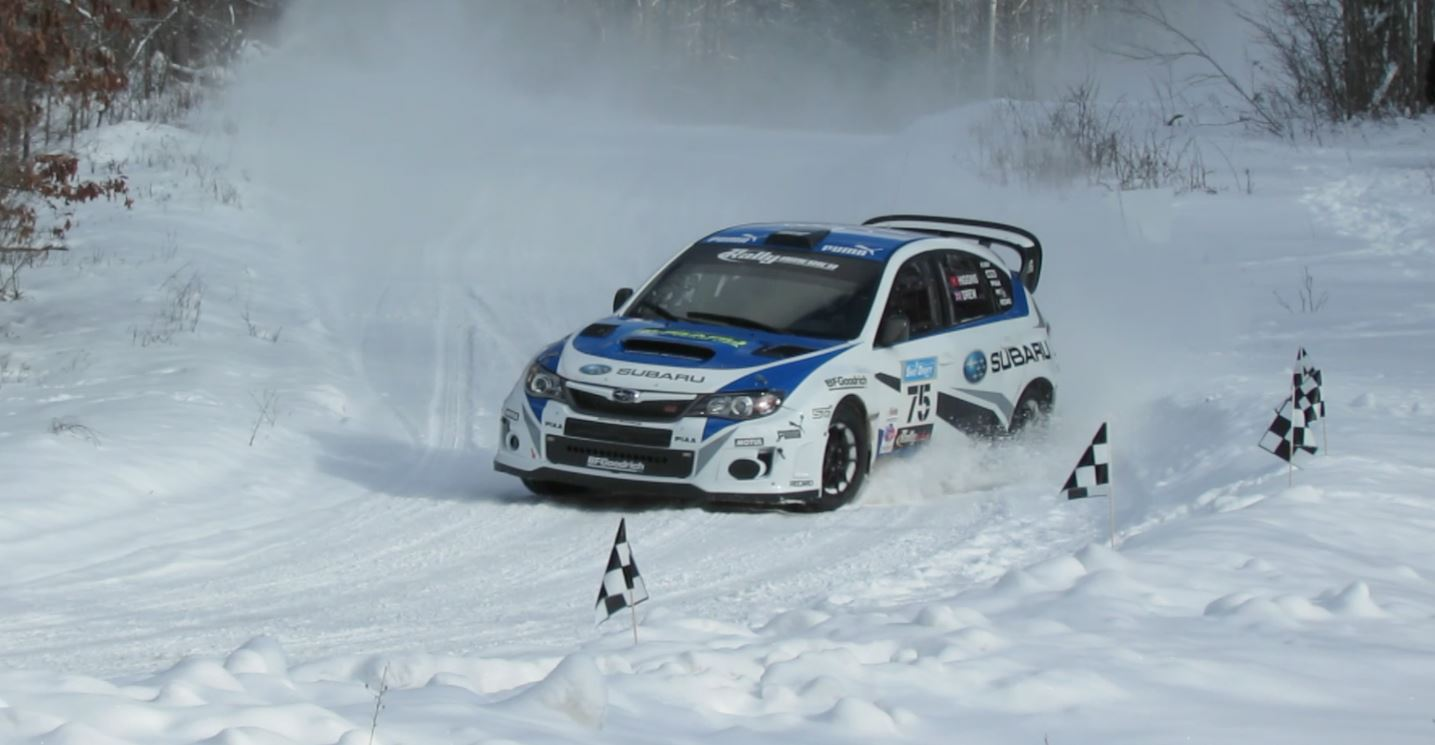
- David Higgins during the 2013 Sno*Drift rally
- Status: Active
- Genre: Rallying
- Frequency: Annual
- Locations: Montmorency County, Michigan
- Country: United States
- Years active: 1973–1975, 1979–1984, 1991–1992, 1997, 1999–present
- Sanctioned by: American Rally Association
- Website: https://www.sno-drift.org/

Sno*Drift is an annual rally racing event held in Montmorency County, Michigan, with headquarters in Atlanta, Michigan. The event was the first Rally America National Rally Championship event of the season, and is currently the first American Rally Association National Championship. Sno*Drift is a winter rally, run primarily on snow-covered gravel surface roads, and is held in late January or early February. Unlike other snow rally events, studded tires cannot be used per Michigan law, which makes Sno*Drift particularly challenging.

== History ==
=== A national event in the 1970s and 1980s ===
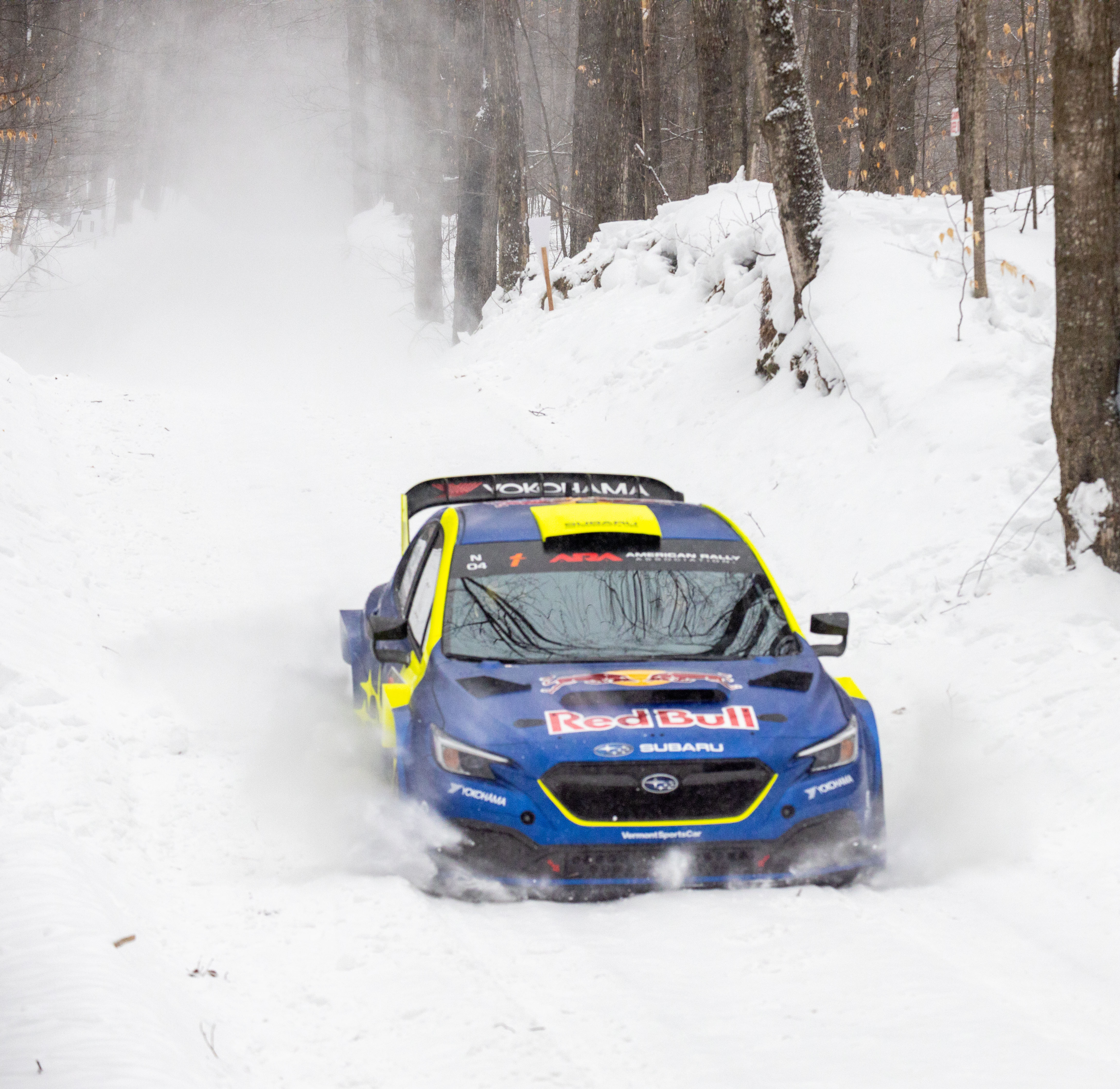
Sno* Drift rally 2025

Sno*Drift was first held in 1973 as a National event as part of the SCCA Performance Rally series near Grayling, Michigan. Chaired by Tim Steiner, the event was won by the team of Erhard Dahm and John Campbell driving a Jeep Wagoneer, with Gene Henderson and Ken Pogue finished 2nd in a similar vehicle. Scott Harvey and Tom King placed third in a Dodge Colt. Of the 38 teams starting the event, 24 finished.

The event was repeated the next year with Henderson and Pogue rising to win over Dahm with new co-driver Tom Grimshaw. Third was again captured by Harvey, who also had a new co-driver (Wayne Zitkus). The final Sno*Drift of the period was held in 1975, and was won by Harvey and Zitkus, this time with a Dodge Ramcharger, while second place was claimed by Tom Tolles and Virginia Reese in a Volvo 122S and third by Bob Hourihan and Doug Shepherd, also in a Volvo 122S.

Sno*Drift was not held again until 1979 when it again became a national event for the SCCA. This running saw 48 teams enter, of whom 31 finished. Taisto Heinonen and Tom Burgess won the event in a Toyota Celica GT while Doug Leverton and Greg Wilkinson placed second in their Datsun 510 and Scott Harvey and Randy Graves finished third in a Dodge Aspen.

A total of 46 teams entered the 1980 event, while only 24 finished. Overall winners were Guy Light and Jim Brandt in a Jeep CJ-7, followed by John Buffum and Doug Shepherd in a Triumph TR7, and by Dick Turner and Tom Grimshaw in an International Scout. The 1980 winner in the production class was the team of Erik Zenz and Brian Berg in a Saab 99L followed by Curt Spicer and Tom Hudak, also in a Saab 99, and by Roger Suppes and Woody Crutchfield in a Toyota Corolla.

Sno*Drift was held in 1981 with 49 teams entering and 38 finishing. Jean-Paul Perusse and Jim Brandt took the overall win in their Peugeot 504, while second place was claimed by Randy Black and Fred Baker in a Datsun 510, and third by Bjorn Anderson and Randy Weiser in a Toyota Celica. Niall Leslie and Doug Martin captured the 1981 production class win in a Datsun 200 SX, with second in class going to Gene Henderson and Jim Kloosterman, and third to Guy Light and Jim Brandt, with both teams driving a pair of AMC Eagle SX/4 coupes.

Sno*Drift saw 50 entries in 1982 with 31 finishing the rally even though there was no snow. John Buffum and Tom Grimshaw took first with an Audi Quattro, with second going to Rod Millen and John Bellefleur in a Mazda RX-7 and third to Doug Shepherd and Jim Roller in a Colt. The production class winners were Guy Light and Jim Brandt in an Oldsmobile Omega, followed by just 24 seconds by Gene Henderson and Jim Kloosterman in their AMC Eagle SX/4, and Erik Zenz and Lawson Smith in a Saab 99 EMS.

The 1983 event marked the eighth running of Sno*Drift and was also the last of the period run as a national event. A total of 40 teams entered while only 28 finished. Rod Millen and Michael Parris won overall in their RX-7, with Mark Klos and Andrew Klos taking second in a Jeep C101, and Don Jankowski and Karen Landau finishing third in a Dodge Charger. The Production class was led by a pair of Dodge Chargers, the first driven by Cal Landau and Craig Marr, and the second by Dan Coughnour and Eric Marcus, while Gene Henderson and Jim Kloosterman finished third in their AMC Eagle SX/4.

=== Years as a non-national event ===
Sno*Drift was run in 1984, but was downgraded from a national event to a coefficient 2 divisional event of the, with 28 entries and 20 finishers. The event was held in December as part of the 1985 divisional series. Winners were Tom Bell and Mary Jo Czyzio in a Datsun 510, with second going to Erik Zenz and Steve Nowicki in a Saab 99, and third place awarded to Robert Parks and Jerry Tobin in an Alfa Romeo GTV.

Sno*Drift was run again in 1991, but as a time–speed–distance rally. A total of 14 teams took part, with Gene Henderson and Jim Mickle winning in a BMW 325ix. This team won the following year when the Sno*Drift was run.

=== Restoration as a national event in the 1990s ===
After a long period of dormancy, Sno*Drift was run again as a national event for the SCCA, although not as a full event, but instead at 60%, while also counting as a coefficient 3 divisional event. In 1997, it was held in Montmorency County, Michigan, with 27 entries and 21 finishers. Overall winners were Frank Sprongl and Dan Sprongl in an Audi S2, followed by Steve Gingras and Bill Westrick and by Cal Landau and Eric Marcus, both in the Mitsubishi Eclipse. Group 5 winners were Mike Villemure and Rene Villemure driving a Volkswagen Beetle, followed by Mike Hurst and Lynn Dillon driving a Pontiac Sunbird and by Gail Truess and Paul Truess in a Chevrolet Citation. Group 2 winners were Gerald Sweet and Stuart Spark in a Saab 99 EMS, followed by Wayne Prochaska and Annette Prochaska in a Volkswagen Golf and Art Burmeister and Randy Moore in a Volkswagen GTI. The Production GT class win went to Steve Gingras and Bill Westrick in a Mitsubishi Eclipse followed by another Eclipse driven by Cal Landau and Eric Marcus and an Eagle Talon piloted by Brian Pepp and Dean Rushford. The Production class was won by a Ford Escort GT driven by Tad Ohtake and Bob Martin followed by a Honda Civic driven by Jay Kowalik and Jeff Wheeler. It was intended to run the event in 1998, although this was canceled due to extreme weather conditions.

The Sno*Drift was run in 1999 as a 60% national event and coefficient 3 divisional event. Overall victory went to Tom Ottey and Pam McGarvey in a Mazda 323 GTX, followed up by Jon Kemp and Brian Maxwell in an Audi 4000 Quattro and by Peter Lahm and Matt Chester in a Mitsubishi Lancer Evo IV. Group 5 was won by Henry Krolikowski and Cindy Krolikowski in a Dodge Shadow GT, followed by Mark Utecht and Diane Sargent in a Dodge Omni and by Jeremy Butts and Peter Jacobs in a Plymouth Arrow. Group 2 winners were Wayne and Annette Prochaska in a Volkswagen Golf followed by David S. Cizmas and David L. Cizmas in a Suzuki Swift and by Art Burmeister and Randy Moore in their GTI. Ottey and McGarvey also took the Production GT victory, with Chris Czyzio and Eric Carlson in second and Cal Landau and Eric Marcus in third, both in Eclipses. Production class victory went to a pair of Volkswagen GTIs, the first driven by Karl Scheible and Gail McGuire, and the second by Brian Vinson and Richard Beels. Third was captured by a Plymouth Neon ACR piloted by Evan Moen and Ronald Moen.

=== Becoming a full national event ===
In 2000, Sno*Drift was promoted to a full national event. It became part of the SCCA's ProRally series and would run all of the stages that comprised the rally. In addition, there would be two SCCA ClubRally events. The first, titled simply Sno, covered the first portion of the rally's stages, and was considered a coefficient 2 club rally, while the second, entitled Drift, covered the remaining stages and was scored as a coefficient 3 club rally. Competitors could enter any or all of these rallies and score points in the appropriate series

=== Expansion to a two-day event ===
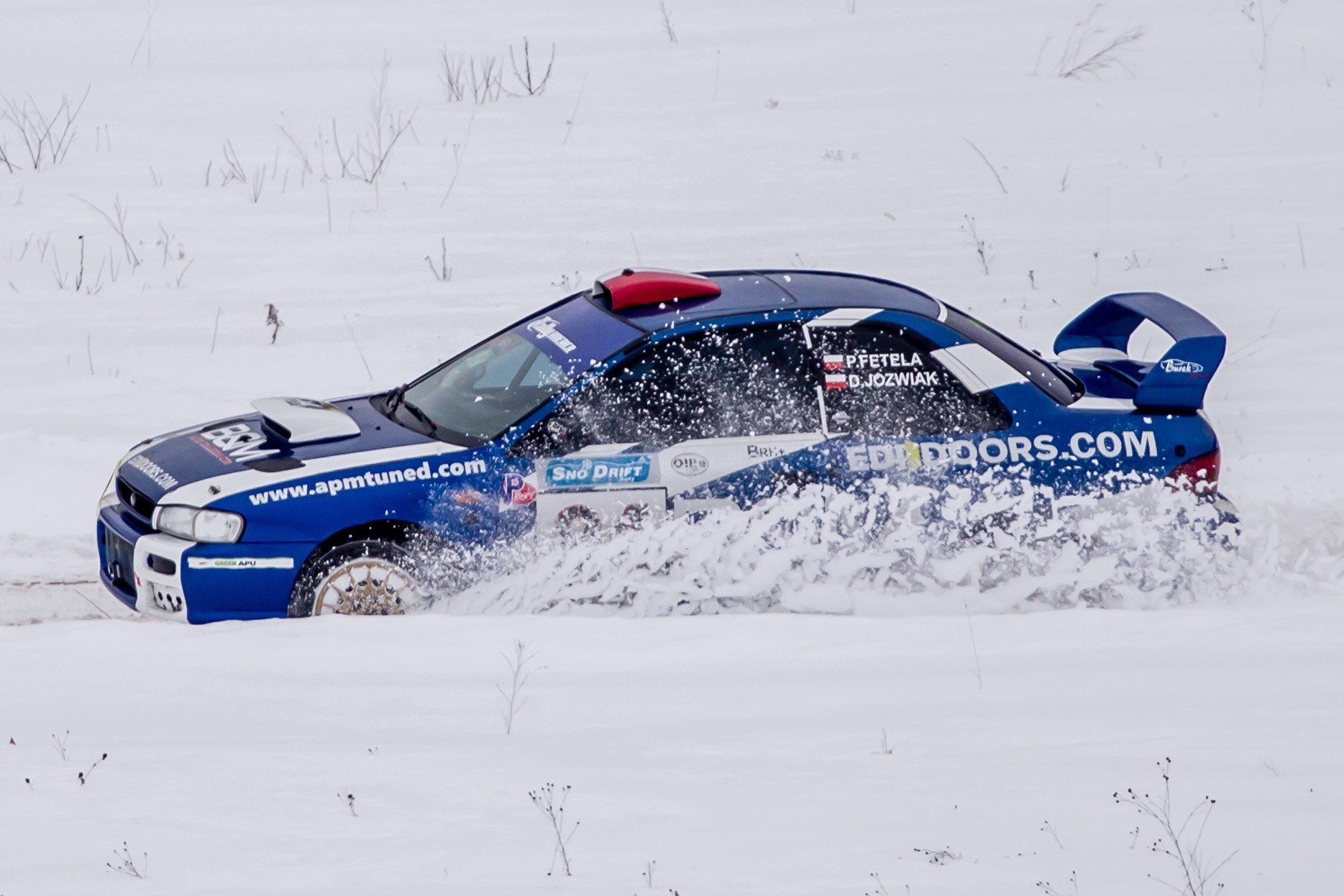
Piotr Fetela, winner of the 2016 edition

In 2002, Sno*Drift was expanded to cover two days, with the Sno club rally covering day one and Drift on day two. In 2003, the event was awarded the ProRally of the Year title by the SCCA. The 2004 event was marked by heavy snow.

=== Transition to Rally America ===
In 2005, the SCCA transferred the organization and marketing of ProRally and ClubRally to Rally America, Inc., with Sno*Drift as the first event of the 2005 calendar, and thus the first event to take place under Rally America organization.

=== Transition to American Rally Association ===
After the collapse of Rally America at the end of 2018, the event became part of the American Rally Association National Championship, starting in 2019.

== Winners (since 1973) ==
Year	Driver	Co-driver	Car
1973	(Germany) Erhard Dahm	(United States) John Campbell	Jeep Wagoneer
1974	(United States) Gene Henderson	(United States) Ken Pogue	Jeep Wagoneer
1975	(United States) Scott Harvey Sr.	(United States) Wayne Zitkus	Dodge Ramcharger
1976–78	not held		
1979	(Finland) Taisto Heinonen	(Canada) Tom Burgess	Toyota Celica 2000 GT
1980	(United States) Guy Light	(United States) Jim Brandt	Jeep CJ-7
1981	(Canada) Jean-Paul Pérusse	(Canada) Louis Bélanger	Peugeot 504
1982	(United States) John Buffum	(United States) Tom Grimshaw	Audi Quattro
1983	(New Zealand) Rod Millen	(United States) Michael Parris	Mazda RX-7
1984	(United States) Tom Bell	(United States) Marie Jo Czyzio	Datsun 510
1985–90	not held		
1991	(United States) Gene Henderson	(United States) Jim Mickle	BMW 325ix
1992	(United States) Gene Henderson	(United States) Jim Mickle	BMW 325ix
1993–96	not held		
1997	(Canada) Frank Sprongl	(Canada) Dan Sprongl	Audi Coupé S2
1998	cancelled due to El Niño		
1999	(United States) Thomas Ottey	(United States) Pamela McGarvey	Mazda 323 GTX
2000	(United States) Paul Choninere	(United States) Jeffrey Becker	Hyundai Tiburon
2001	(United States) Paul Choninere	(United States) Jeffrey Becker	Hyundai Tiburon
2002	(Canada) Frank Sprongl	(Canada) Dan Sprongl	Hyundai Elantra
2003	(United Kingdom) David Higgins	(United Kingdom) Daniel Barritt	Mitsubishi Lancer Evo VIII
2004	(Canada) Patrick Richard	(Canada) Brian Maxwell	Subaru Impreza WRX
2005	(Canada) Patrick Richard	(Canada) Nathalie Richard	Subaru Impreza WRX
2006	(Canada) Andrew Comrie-Picard	(United States) Rod Hendricksen	Mitsubishi Lancer Evo IV
2007	(United States) Travis Pastrana	(Sweden) Björn Christian Edström	Subaru Impreza STi N12
2008	(Canada) Antoine L'Estage	(Canada) Nathalie Richard	Hyundai Tiburon
2009	(United States) Travis Pastrana	(Sweden) Björn Christian Edström	Subaru Impreza STi N14
2010	(United States) Travis Pastrana	(Sweden) Björn Christian Edström	Subaru Impreza STi N14
2011	(United States) Travis Hanson	(United States) Terry Hanson	Subaru Impreza STi N12
2012	(United Kingdom) David Higgins	(United Kingdom) Craig Drew	Subaru Impreza STi N14
2013	(Canada) Antoine L'Estage	(Canada) Nathalie Richard	Mitsubishi Lancer Evo X
2014	(United Kingdom) David Higgins	(United Kingdom) Craig Drew	Subaru Impreza STi N14
2015	(United Kingdom) David Higgins	(United Kingdom) Craig Drew	Subaru WRX STI
2016	(Poland) Piotr Fetela	(Poland) Dominik Jozwiak	Subaru Impreza WRX STi
2017	(Poland) Arkadiusz Gruszka	(Poland) Łukasz Wroński	Mitsubishi Mirage RS Proto
2018	(United States) David Brown	(United States) Michael Brown	Subaru Impreza RS
2019	(Poland) Piotr Fetela	(Poland) Dominik Jozwiak	Ford Fiesta Proto
2020	(Republic of Ireland) Barry McKenna	(Republic of Ireland) James Fulton	Ford Fiesta R5
2021	(United States) Travis Pastrana	(Australia) Rhianon Gelsomino	Subaru WRX STI
2022	(United States) Mark Piatkowski	(Italy) Aaron Crescenti	Subaru Impreza RS
2023	(Canada) Brandon Semenuk	(United Kingdom) Keaton Williams	Subaru WRX STI
2024	(Canada) Brandon Semenuk	(United Kingdom) Keaton Williams	Subaru WRX (VB)
2025	(Canada) Brandon Semenuk	(United Kingdom) Keaton Williams	Subaru WRX (VB)
2026	(United States) Mark Piatkowski	(United States) Aris Mantopoulos	Subaru Impreza RS

== See also ==
- American Rally Association
- Rally America
- Rallying
- Andros Trophy
- Jänner Rallye
