= New England Forest Rally =

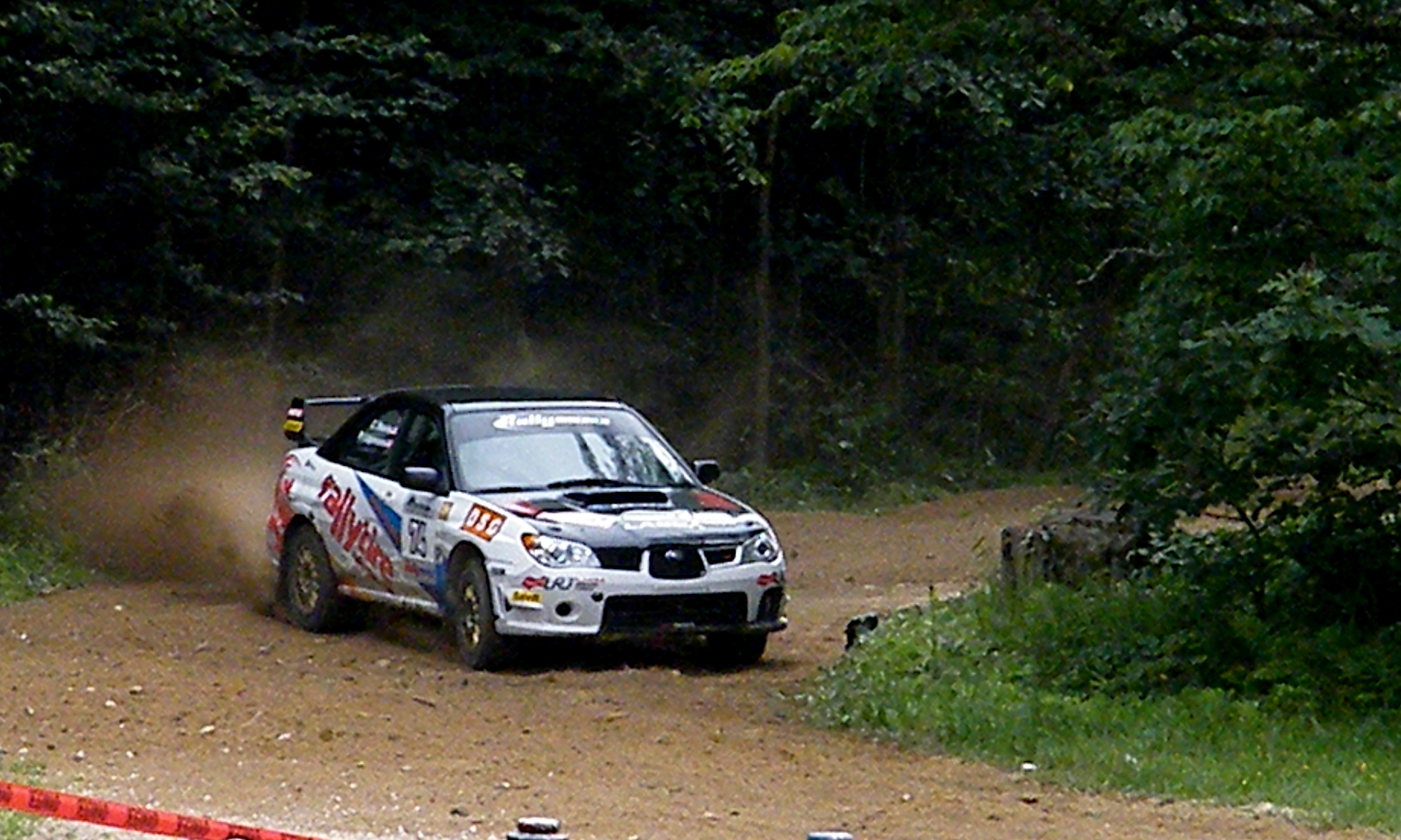
Ramana Lagemann during the 2010 New England Forest Rally

The New England Forest Rally is a performance rally event in New Hampshire and Maine, United States. Originally known as the Maine Forest Rally, it first appeared in 1991 as a winter rally. In the past, the event was part of the SCCA ProRally and Rally America schedule, through 2023 it has been sanctioned by the American Rally Association.

The event is held mainly on logging roads with some of the longest stages in North America rallying. As the event is held during July, the road conditions are often dry and dusty.

In 1994 the Maine Summer Rally was added. The event ran as a 60% National/Divisional and as a full National event starting in 1995. In 1996 an in-town spectator stage was added to the summer event to the delight of the spectators. The most recent in-town stages, held at the Mexico Recreation Area, have featured a 1 meter high man-made jump.

At its peak, the Maine Forest Rally had the highest number of starting cars in the SCCA ProRally series. The 2001 event, with 121 National and ClubRally starting teams, broke the 111 car starting record held by the 2000 Maine Forest Rally. As a bellwether of the event's success, it was voted the SCCA's ProRally of the Year in 1992 and again in 2001.

In 2007, the name of the event was changed to the New England Forest Rally to better reflect the continued growth of the event by expanding to include stages in the city of Berlin, New Hampshire.

During the 2023 Rally the death of competitor and champion co-driver Erin Kelly occurred on the final stage of the competition on Friday just outside Bethel, Maine. Kelly was co-driving with her long-time driver and rally partner, TJ Pullen, at the time of the incident. The 47-year-old Kelly and Pullen had rallied together for several years and won the 2018 ARA East Regional NA4WD championship. The remaining competition was canceled.

Unrelated in the Fall of 2023 ARA and NEFR discussed the availability of roads in the area and the difficulty in finding ways to limit transits. The organizer faced shrinking road availability and used every road available. An exhaustive effort was undertaken, but no solutions were found. Without more stage roads available and rising costs for road usage, the direction was clear. 527 total miles with 112 Stage miles was untenable.

In the Spring of 2024 with no new organizer forthcoming TENNY Consulting LLC, a rally organizing group known for the McCreary Gravel Rally based in Stearns, Kentucky, took ownership of the event and began the work of reimagining the New England Forest Rally. Work began in earnest on the July 11-12 2025 Regional Rally in August 2024. The event is to be centered around Errol NH in cooperation with local authorities and land owners in the same way they have demonstrated in their organizing of local community based events such as the McCreary Gravel Rallies.

On August 21 TENNY Consulting announced on the Facebook North American Rally Page that the event would transition to the formal name of Errol Northwoods Rally (ENR). ErrolNorthwoodsRally.com was created and it is expected to be developed soon.

Efforts are underway to bring back this event as a Snow/Winter event in early 2027.

== Notable competitors ==
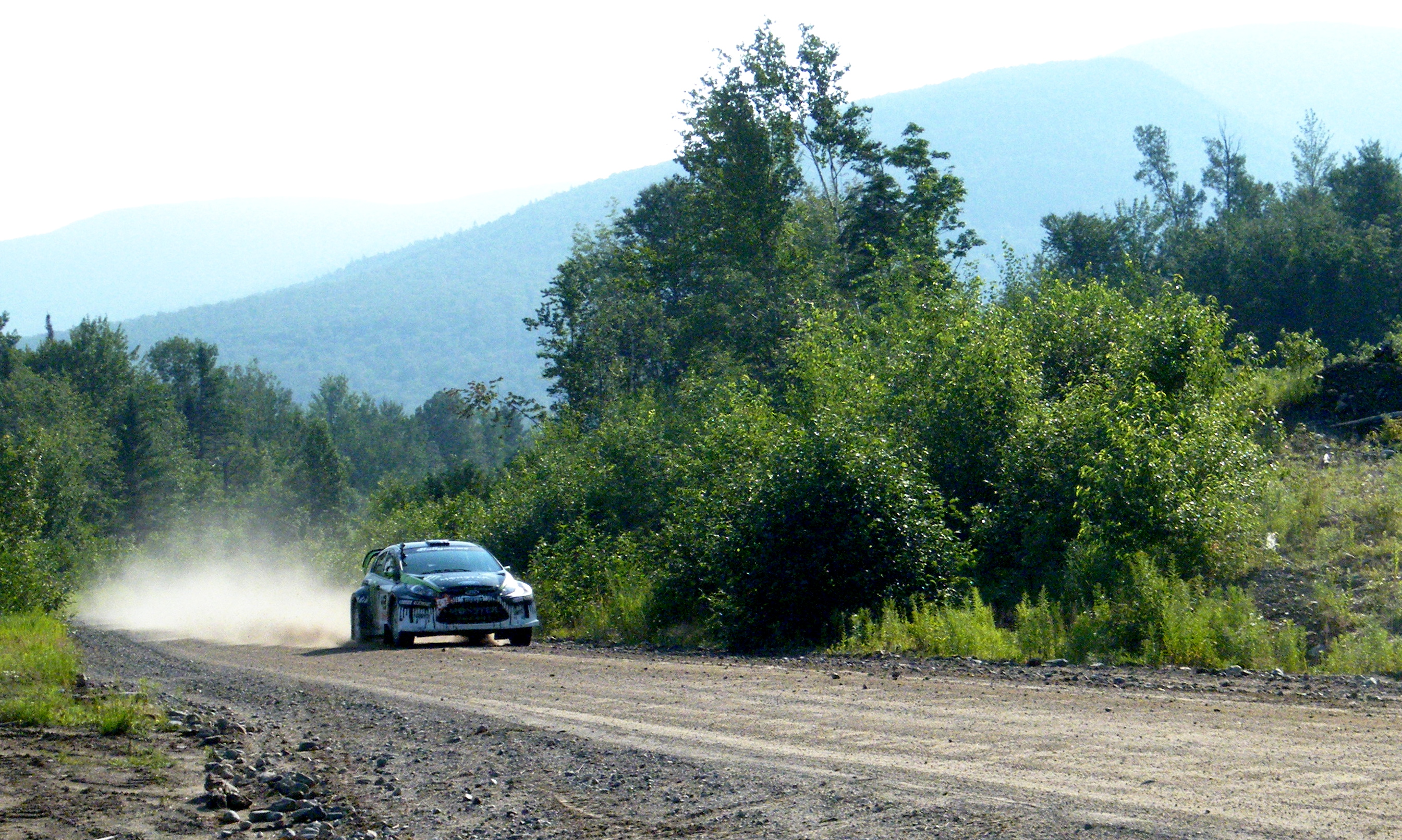
Ken Block during the 2010 New England Forest Rally

The 1999 event saw 1984 World Rally Champion Stig Blomqvist drive the late Carl Merrill's Ford Escort Cosworth to victory over 83 National and Divisional teams.

In 2007, freestyle motocross star turned rally driver Travis Pastrana drove a Subaru Rally Team USA WRX STi to victory.

Ken Block, co-founder of DC Shoe Co. and rally driver competed at the New England Forest Rally regularly.

John Buffum, the most successful American-born rally driver ever, was a key organizer of the event, and in 2008, he drove his Group B Audi Quattro on the first stage of the event.

=== Past winners ===
Year	Driver / Navigator	Vehicle	Time	Notes
1994	Paul Choinere; Jeff Becker	Audi S2 Quattro	1:15:43	
1995	Carl Merrill; John Bellefluer	Ford Escort Cosworth	1:57:41	
1996	Paul Choinere; Jeff Becker	Hyundai Elantra AWD	1:55:31	
1997	Frank Sprongl; Dan Sprongl	Audi S2 Quattro	1:48:30	
1998	Paul Choinere; Jeff Becker	Hyundai Tiburon	1:37:47	
1999	Stig Blomqvist; Lance Smith	Ford Escort RS Cosworth	1:39:58	
2000	Paul Choinere; Jeff Becker	Hyundai Tiburon AWD	1:27:52	
2001	Seamus Burke; Frank Cunningham	Mitsubishi Lancer Evo VI	1:28:44	
2002	Mark Lovell; Steve Turvey	Subaru Impreza WRX STi	3:51:18	
2003	David Higgins; Daniel Barritt	Mitsubishi Lancer Evo VIII	1:40:42	
2004	Paul Choinere; Jeff Becker	Hyundai Tiburon AWD	1:29:24	
2005	Patrick Richard; Nathalie Richard	Subaru Impreza WRX STi	1:15:22	
2006	Ramana Lagemann; Michael Fennell	Ford Escort RS Cosworth	1:06:08	One stage cancelled.
2007	Travis Pastrana; Christian Bjorn Edstrom	Subaru Impreza WRX STi	1:11:40	
2008	Niall McShea; Marshall Clarke	Mitsubishi Lancer Evolution	1:26:23	
2009	Travis Pastrana; Christian Bjorn Edstrom	Subaru Impreza WRX STi	1:06:55	2 stages cancelled.
2010	Antoine L'Estage; Nathalie Richard	Mitsubishi Lancer Evo X	1:31:41	
2011	Antoine L'Estage; Nathalie Richard	Mitsubishi Lancer Evo X	1:32:34	
2012	Antoine L'Estage; Nathalie Richard	Mitsubishi Lancer Evo X	1:10:11	
2013	Ken Block; Alessandro Gelsomino	Ford Fiesta RS WRC	1:34:34	
2014	David Higgins; Craig Drew	Subaru Impreza WRX STi	1:24:53	
2015	David Higgins; Craig Drew	Subaru Impreza WRX STi	1:30:19	
2016	Seamus Burke; Martin Brady	Mitsubishi Evolution IX	1:29:33	
2017	Travis Pastrana; Robbie Durant & Grzegorz Dorman	Subaru Impreza WRX STi	1:29:36	
2018	David Higgins; Craig Drew	Subaru Impreza WRX STi	1:13:28	3 stages cancelled.
2019	David Higgins; Craig Drew	Subaru Impreza WRX STi	1:22:30	
2020	not held			
2021	David Higgins; Craig Drew	Ford Fiesta S2000	1:23:11	
2022	Brandon Semenuk; Keaton Williams	Subaru Impreza WRX STi	1:27:27	
2023	Brandon Semenuk; Keaton Williams	Subaru Impreza WRX STi	31:11	Second leg cancelled due to a fatal accident.
