= Olympus Rally =

Rally competition

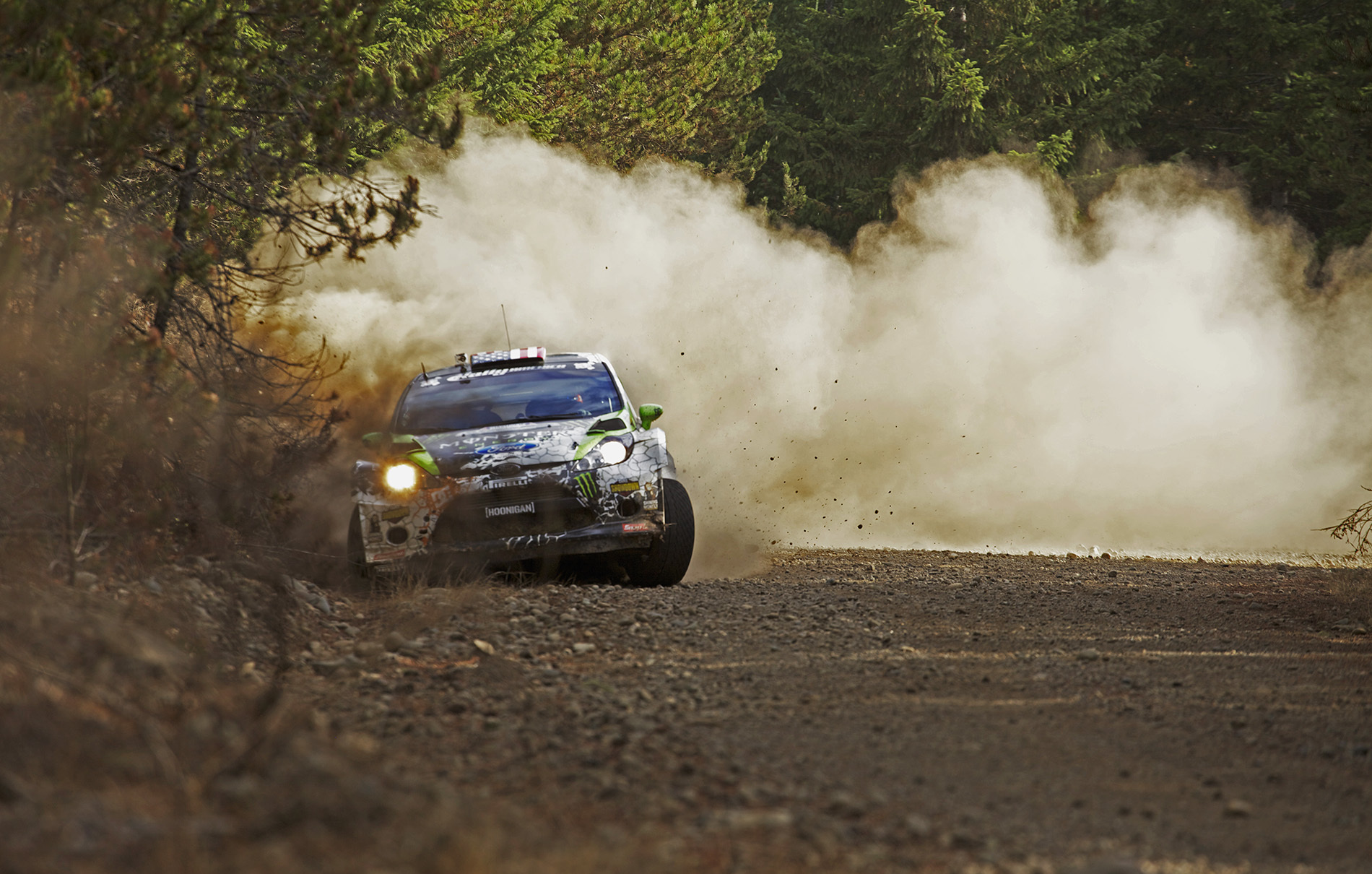
Ken Block, winner of the 2012 Olympus Rally

The Olympus Rally is an event in the motorsport of rallying. While it has usually been run as a national rally, in 1986–1988, it was a round in the FIA World Rally Championship, the most recent time a WRC rally has been run in the United States and the last in North America until Rally Mexico in 2004.

== TSD Rally ==
The first Olympus Rally was held as a Time Speed Distance rally in 1968. It continued as a TSD rally until 1973 when SCCA started the SCCA Pro Rally Championship with the Olympus Rally as its second event.

== World Rally Championship ==
After being observed by the FIA for WRC status in 1985, from 1986–1988, the Olympus was a round of the World Rally Championship. From 1985–1987, the rally was sponsored by Toyota.

The 1985 Olympus “World Championship Prototype” event was won by Hannu Mikkola and Arne Hertz in a Group B Audi Quattro S1.

Markku Alen emerged on top of the results as the 1986 Olympus first gained full World Championship status, taking a Lancia Delta S4 and co-driver Ilkka Kivimäki to victory.

In 1987, the Olympus was attended by a number of top international teams, including Nissan, Toyota, and Suzuki. Juha Kankkunen won overall, as his and other Lancia Delta HF 4WD’s dominated the podium.

Massimo “Miki” Biasion won the fourth and final Olympus World Championship Rally in 1988 – his fourth of the season for Lancia, on his way to being the first Italian FIA World Rally Champion.

=== Winners ===
Year	Driver	Codriver	Car
1985	(Finland) Hannu Mikkola	(Sweden) Arne Hertz	Audi Sport Quattro S1
1986	(Finland) Markku Alén	(Finland) Ilkka Kivimäki	Lancia Delta S4
1987	(Finland) Juha Kankkunen	(Finland) Juha Piironen	Lancia Delta HF 4WD
1988	(Italy) Miki Biasion	(Italy) Tiziano Siviero	Lancia Delta Integrale

== National Rally ==
The Olympus Rally was first held as a stage rally in 1973. It was headquartered in Shelton, WA and was part of the SCCA Pro Rally Championship. It continued to be part of that championship through 1975. In 1976, it became part of the NARA (North American Rally Association) championship (which later changed its name to NARRA (North American Rally Racing Association)). It was part of that championship through 1979. In 1980, it switched back to the SCCA ProRally Championship and remained in that championship through 1987.

While the name was used for a regional rally supporting the 2001 Wild West SCCA Pro Rally, the Olympus Rally was not held from 1989 through 2005.

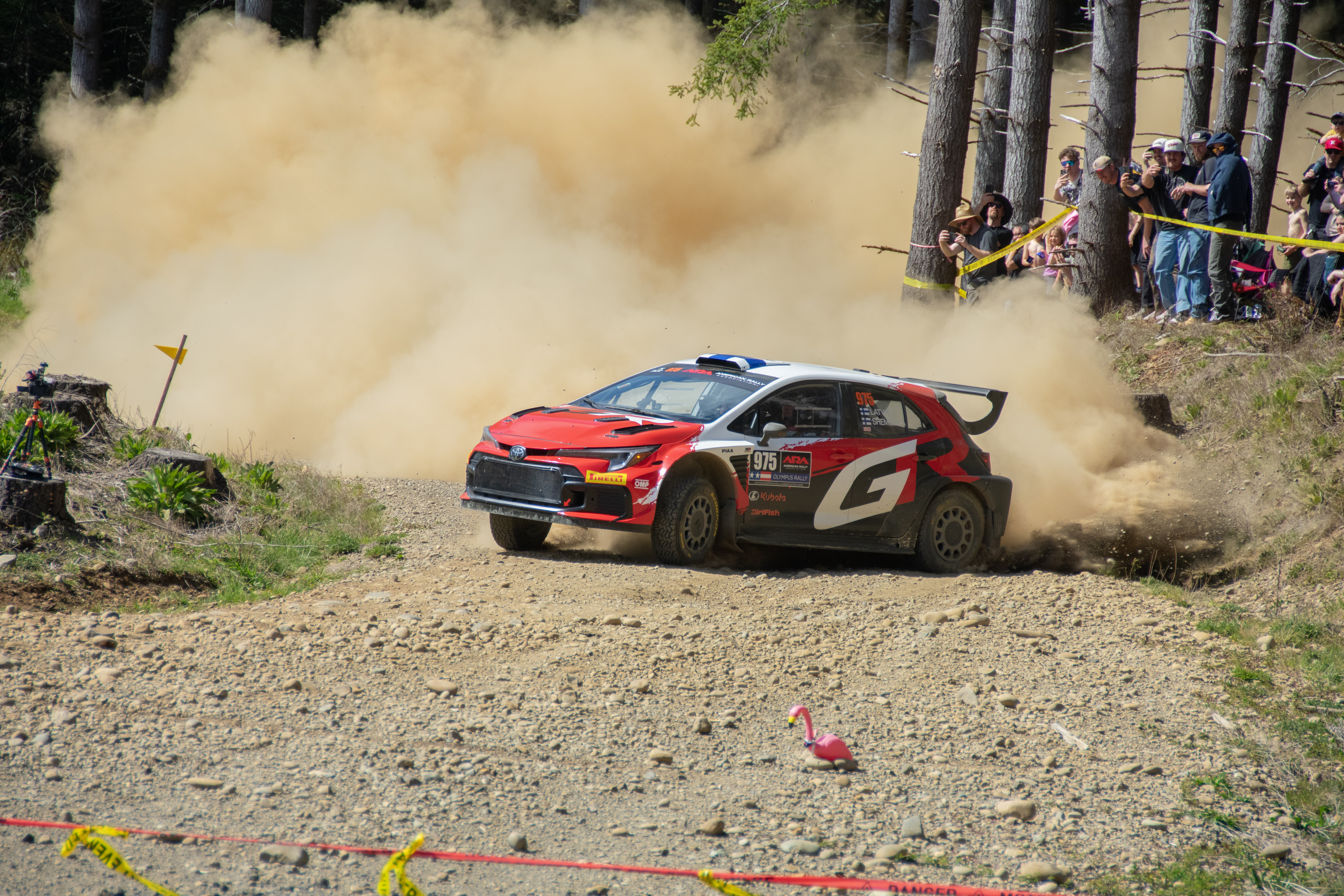
Jari-Matti Latvala and Tuukka Shemeikka in their Toyota GR Corolla Rally RC2 won the 2026 Olympus Rally in Shelton, Washington.

The Olympus Rally returned as national rally in 2006 and was part of the United States Rally Championship. In 2007, it switched to the Rally America National Championship and was part of that championship through 2012. After a dispute with Rally America, the rally was cancelled in 2013. It was originally scheduled to return as a NASA Rally Sport National qualifier round in 2014, however the issues with Rally America were resolved and the rally ran as a Rally America regional that year. In 2015, it returned to the Rally America National Championship. In 2017 it became sanctioned by the American Rally Association and has been a round in the ARA National Championship since then.

=== Winners ===
Year	Driver	Codriver	Car	Rally HQ
1973	(United States) Gene Henderson	(United States) Ken Pogue	AMC Jeep	Shelton, WA
1974	(United States) Gene Henderson	(United States) Ken Pogue	AMC Jeep	Shelton, WA
1975	(United States) John Buffum	(United States) Vicki Dykema	Ford Escort	Tumwater, WA
1976	(United States) John Buffum	(United States) Vicki Dykema	Porsche Carrera	Olympia, WA
1977	(United States) Ron Richardson	(United States) Ray Hocker	Plymouth Arrow	Tacoma, WA
1978	(United States) John Buffum	(United States) Doug Shepherd	Triumph TR7	Olympia, WA
1979	(United States) Hendrik Blok	(United States) Damon Trimble	Plymouth Arrow	Olympia, WA
1980	(New Zealand) Rod Millen	(United States) Dave Weiman	Mazda RX-7	Tumwater, WA
1981	(New Zealand) Rod Millen	(United States) Bob Kraushaar	Mazda RX-7	Olympia, WA
1982	(United States) John Buffum	(United States) Doug Shepherd	Audi Quattro	Tumwater, WA
1983	(New Zealand) Rod Millen	(United States) R. Dale Kraushaar	Mazda RX-7	Tumwater, WA
1984	(New Zealand) Rod Millen	(United States) R. Dale Kraushaar	Mazda RX-7	Tumwater, WA
2006	(United States) Wyeth Gubelmann	(United States) Cindy Krolikowski	Subaru Impreza WRX STI	Shelton, WA
2007	(United States) Ramana Lagemann	(United States) Mark Williams	Mitsubishi Lancer Evolution	Shelton, WA
2008	(United States) Ken Block	(Italy) Alessandro Gelsomino	Subaru Impreza WRX STI	Pomeroy, WA
2009	(United States) Travis Pastrana	(United States) Christian Edstrom	Subaru Impreza WRX STI	Aberdeen, WA
2010	(United States) Travis Pastrana	(United States) Christian Edstrom	Subaru Impreza WRX STI	Ocean Shores, WA
2011	(United Kingdom) David Higgins	(United Kingdom) Craig Drew	Subaru Impreza WRX STI	Ocean Shores, WA
2012	(United States) Ken Block	(Italy) Alessandro Gelsomino	Ford Fiesta	Olympia, WA
2014	(Canada) Hardy Schmidtke	(Canada) Chris Kremer	Mitsubishi Lancer Evolution	Shelton, WA
2015	(United Kingdom) David Higgins	(United Kingdom) Craig Drew	Subaru WRX STI	Shelton, WA
2016	(United Kingdom) David Higgins	(United Kingdom) Craig Drew	Subaru WRX STI	Shelton, WA
2017	(United Kingdom) David Higgins	(United Kingdom) Craig Drew	Subaru WRX STI	Shelton, WA
2018	(Sweden) Patrik Sandell	(Sweden) Per Almkvist	Subaru WRX STI	Shelton, WA
2019	(Sweden) Oliver Solberg	(France) Denis Giraudet	Subaru WRX STI	Shelton, WA
2020	(Republic of Ireland) Barry McKenna	(Republic of Ireland) Leon Jordan	Škoda Fabia	Shelton, WA
2021	(United States) Travis Pastrana	(Australia) Rhianon Gelsomino	Subaru WRX STI	Shelton, WA
2022	(Canada) Brandon Semenuk	(United Kingdom) Keaton Williams	Subaru WRX STI	Shelton, WA
2023	(Canada) Brandon Semenuk	(United Kingdom) Keaton Williams	Subaru WRX ARA24	Shelton, WA
2024	(Canada) Brandon Semenuk	(United Kingdom) Keaton Williams	Subaru WRX ARA25	Shelton, WA
2025	(Canada) Brandon Semenuk	(United Kingdom) Keaton Williams	Subaru WRX ARA25	Shelton, WA
2026	(Finland) Jari-Matti Latvala	(Finland) Tuukka Shemeikka	Toyota GR Corolla Rally RC2	Shelton, WA
