= Plymouth Arrow =

Plymouth Arrow was the nameplate used for multiple captive imports made by Mitsubishi Motors and sold by the Chrysler Corporation under the Plymouth marque: Also sold as the Dodge Arrow in Canada. it was powered by an option of a 1.6 liter Inline 4 or a 2.0 Liter inline 4. Both were available with a Torqueflite automatic transmission or a 5 speed manual. it came in three trim levels. the 160, 200 and GT.

- The Mitsubishi Celeste, a compact car also sold as the Plymouth Arrow from 1976 to 1980
- The Mitsubishi Forte, a compact pickup truck also sold as the Plymouth Arrow from 1979 to 1982
