= Andrew Comrie-Picard =

Canadian racing driver

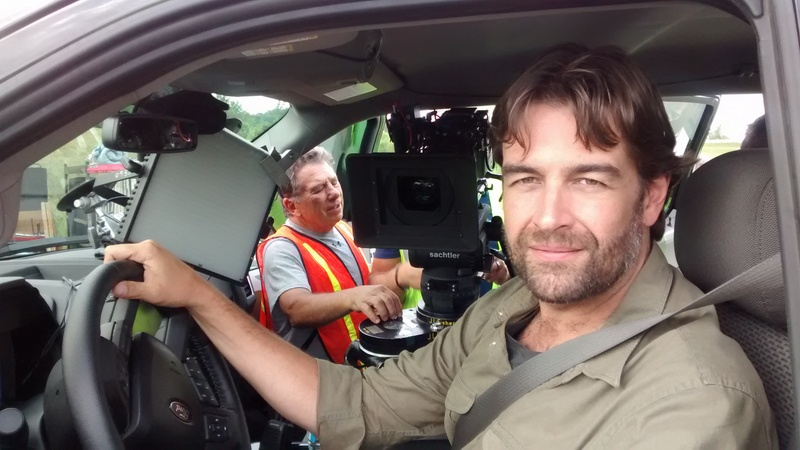
Andrew Comrie-Picard in-car hosting in a 2015 Ford F-150

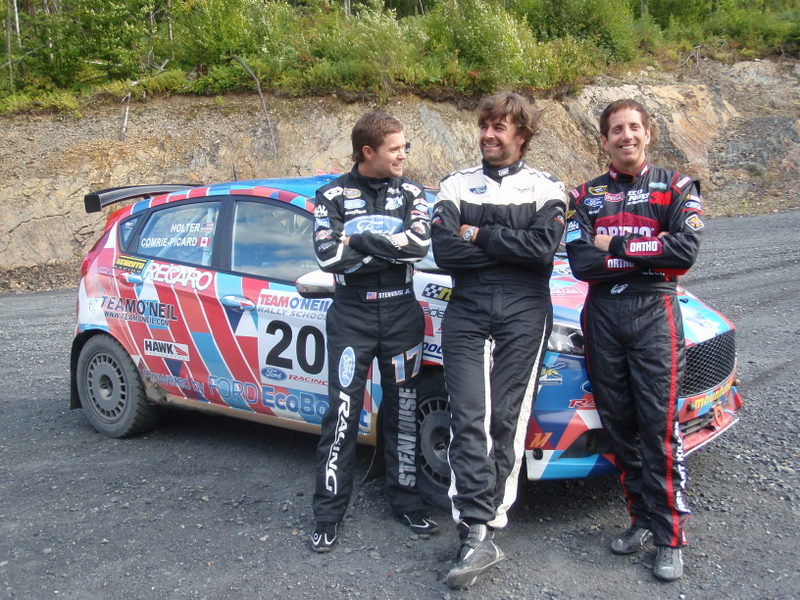
(From left-to-right) Ricky Stenhouse Jr., Andrew Comrie-Picard, and Greg Biffle, test Comrie-Picard's rally car at Team O'Neil Rally School 2014

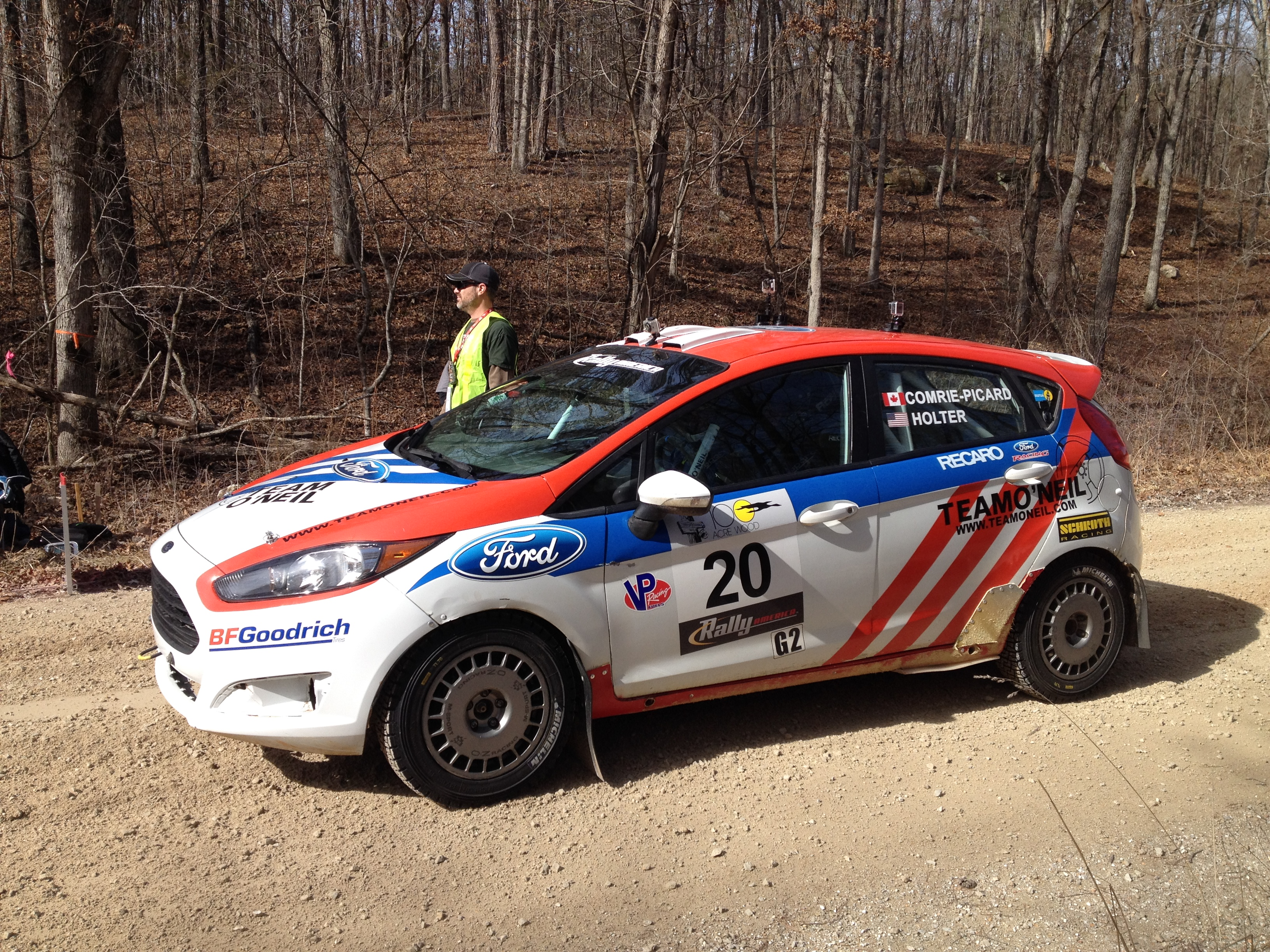
Andrew Comrie-Picard in a rally car during the 2014 Rally in the 100 Acre Wood

Andrew Comrie-Picard (born April 28, 1971) is a Canadian race car driver, X Games athlete, stuntman, and TV personality. He has competed in rally racing,drifting, desert off-road racing, short course off-road racing, hillclimbing, and endurance circuit racing. He has also hosted and produced several automotive TV shows, as well as coordinated and driven stunts in feature films and television.

== Competitions ==
=== Featured Wins ===
Comrie-Picard is a two-time Baja 1000 class winner and Pikes Peak International Hillclimb record-holder. He was one of the four drivers (with Tanner Foust, Travis Pastrana, and Ken Block) to compete at the first five X Games where Rally Car Racing was featured: X Games 12 (2006), X Games 13 (2007), X Games 14 (2008), X Games 15 (2009), and X Games 16 (2010). He also won the 2009 North American Rally Cup championship in a Mitsubishi Lancer Evolution IX, and in 2014, the John Woodner Cup for First Overall in the American 2WD Championship.

Other competitions Comrie-Picard has won during his career include the 2006 Sno*Drift Rally in Michigan, the 2007 Rallye Perce-Neige in Quebec, the 2009 Rally Colorado, and the 2010 Oregon Trail Rally. He also won the Targa Newfoundland road rally in 2008 and 2012 with the Mitsubishi Lancer Evolution X in its competition debut. When competing in 2010 at Pikes Peak, he suffered a crash at the track's "Engineer's Corner."

=== Featured Vehicles ===
Comrie-Picard competed in the two-wheel drive (2WD) category for the 2011 season after having previously competed in all-wheel drive (AWD) vehicles. He drove a manufacturer-backed 2011 Scion xD in selected Rally America events, and a Mark IV Toyota Supra to second place in the Modern division at Targa Newfoundland after coming in sixth in the same car in 2010. He competed in the Baja 1000 desert race in 2011 and 2013 in a Class 10 Baja Challenge buggy for BFGoodrich; he and his team won the race in 2013. In 2012 and 2013, he continued to drive for Scion in Rally America competitions, where he finished second in the 2WD category championship in both seasons. He also competed in the 2012 and 2013 Pikes Peak International Hillclimb with a version of the Scion xD.

Coming off of the successful three-year development program with the Scion Rally Team, in January 2014, he switched to Ford Racing and Team O'Neil, driving a Ford Fiesta ST developed by Team O'Neil and M-Sport to compete in the 2014 Rally America 2WD Championship. He secured the 2014 Rally America 2WD Championship with two races remaining, and in the 2014 season earned five firsts, two seconds, and a third. He also secured 17 consecutive podiums from 2012 to 2014 and put a second car on the overall national podium, making it the second time in the decade that a racer put a second car on the Rally America overall national podium.

In July 2017, Comrie-Picard returned to the American Rally Association Series, racing in the New England Forest Rally for the debut of the Ford Focus RS developed by Team O'Neil. The new car, which had competed for the first time at the Mount Washington Hill Climb, placed first in the Production4WD class and fourth overall.

== Personal life ==
=== Early life ===
Comrie-Picard was raised on a small farm in Alberta, Canada. At an early age, he was interested in stunt driving, spending his childhood driving on dirt roads and fields. After five university degrees, including an MA in Political Economy from Oxford University, he left his career as an entertainment lawyer in New York City to pursue a career in race car driving.

=== Current life ===
Comrie-Picard lives in Los Angeles with his wife and two daughters. He is a main team member of the Transglobal Car Expedition by GoodGear, an international expedition that is circumnavigating the globe with wheeled and amphibious vehicles without leaving the Earth's surface, passing over both geographic poles. The expedition is collecting scientific data on ice thickness, cosmic ray penetration, and global light pollution throughout their route, and aim to promote and utilize positive new technologies and responsible eco-management.

== Television work ==
Comrie-Picard was a consulting producer and stunt coordinator for several seasons of Top Gear USA and the History Channel. More recently, he has appeared as a stunt driver in films starring Tyler Perry, Arnold Schwarzenegger, and Charlize Theron, as well as the Deadpool and Fast and Furious film series. He designed and tested an extreme stunt course for Netflix's show Hyperdrive, and coached competitors worldwide in their attempts to complete it for television. He has coordinated stunts for Fastest Car on Netflix and has performed stunts in several commercials and television shows, including NCIS New Orleans, for which he doubled Scott Bakula.

=== TV appearances ===
Comrie-Picard's acting and hosting career center around automobiles.

- He has co-hosted the Canadian Rally Championship on the CHUM and A-Channel networks.
- He has co-hosted Targa Newfoundland on Speed TV and Rogers Cable.
- He has co-hosted the reality show "War of the Wheels" on Global.
- He was an "extreme auto" correspondent for The New Drivers' Seat TV on CHUM and A-Channel.
- He co-hosted a show for the Discovery Channel called "Ultimate Car Build off" with car designer Chip Foose and fabricator Lou Santiago.
- He hosted a special called BattleCross on Speed TV in 2011 in which he set up a stunt course for two top extreme drivers to compete on.
- He hosted a series of Yahoo! Autos videos in 2013.
- He hosted a GranTurismo launch segment in 2014.
- He hosted Ford's Truth About Trucks video series between 2014 and 2021.
- In 2017, his auto build/stunt show "Car Saviors" aired on Discovery Channel.
