= Susquehannock Trail Performance Rally =

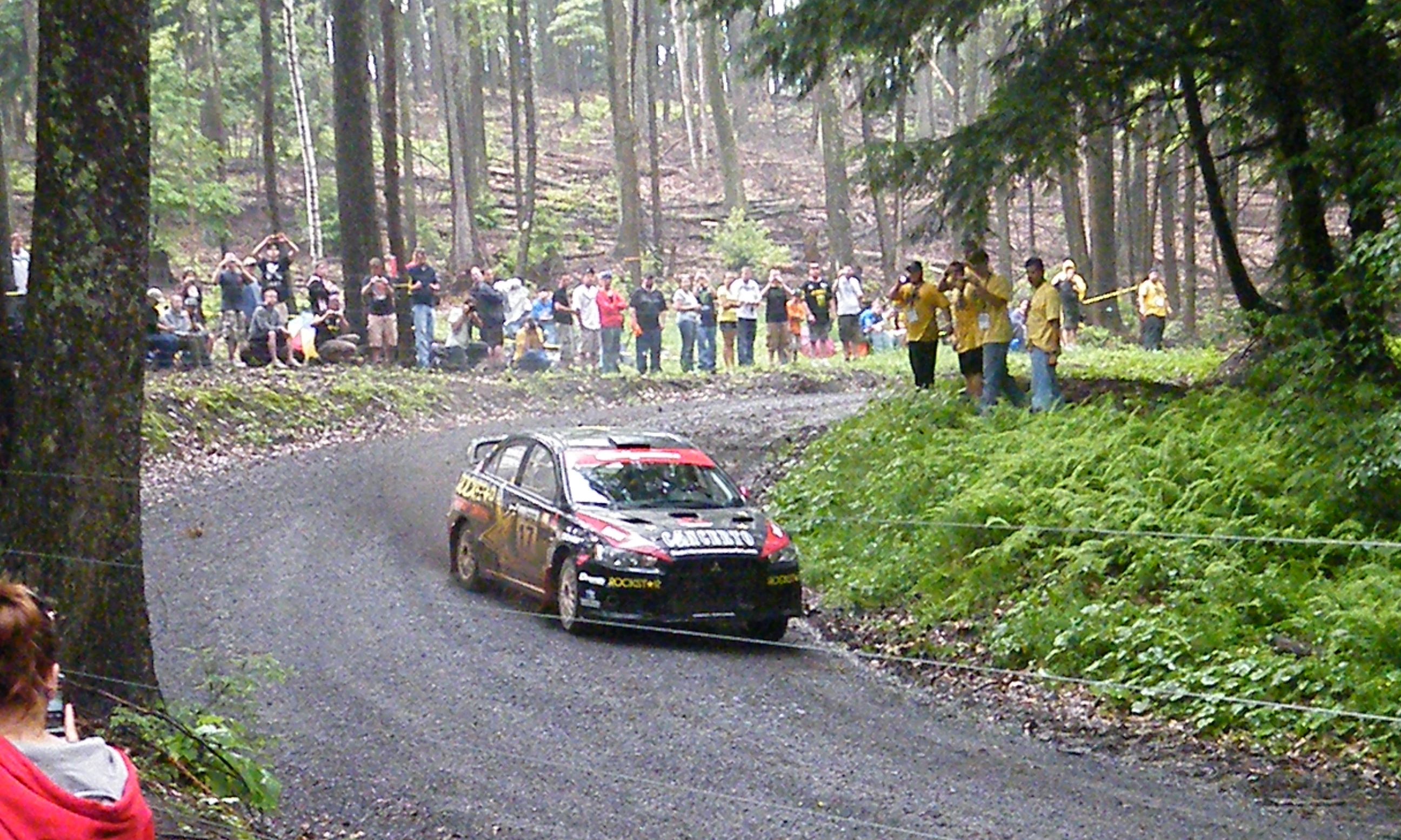
Antoine L'Estage at the 2010 STPR

The Susquehannock Trail Performance Rally (STPR) is an annual rally racing event that is held in Wellsboro, Pennsylvania.

== History ==
The STPR was part of the Rally America National Rally Championship, and in 2017 it became sanctioned by the American Rally Association.

=== Past winners ===
2026	Tom Mayer / Dillon McKenna	Subaru Impreza WRX
2025	Mike Cessna / Jamie Lambert	BMW M3
2024	Dylan Gondyke / Daniel Downey	Subaru Impreza RS
2023	Dylan Gondyke / Benjamin Chuong	Subaru Impreza RS
2022	Ken Block / Alessandro Gelsomino	Hyundai i20 Coupe WRC
2021	John O'Sullivan / Kenneth Quirke	Ford Fiesta R5
2020	Event cancelled	
2019	Oliver Solberg / Aaron Johnston	2018 Subaru WRX STi
2018	David Higgins / Craig Drew	2018 Subaru WRX STi
2017	David Higgins / Craig Drew	2017 Subaru WRX STi
2016	David Higgins / Craig Drew	2016 Subaru WRX STi
2015	David Higgins / Craig Drew	2015 Subaru WRX STi
2014	David Higgins / Craig Drew	2014 Subaru WRX STi
2013	Ken Block / Alessandro Gelsomino	2012 Ford Fiesta
2012	Antoine L'Estage / Nathalie Richard	Mitsubishi Lancer Evolution X
2011	David Higgins / Craig Drew	Subaru Impreza WRX STi
2010	Antoine L'Estage / Nathalie Richard	Mitsubishi Lancer Evolution X
2009	Ken Block / Alessandro Gelsomino	Subaru Impreza WRX STi
2008	Antoine L'Estage / Nathalie Richard	Hyundai Tiburon
2007	Andrew Pinker / Robbie Durant	Subaru Impreza WRX STi
2006	Matt Iorio / Ole Holder	Subaru Impreza
2005	Paul Choiniere / Jeff Becker	Hyundai Tiburon
2004	Shane Mitchell / Glenn Patterson	Subaru Impreza
2003	David Higgins / Daniel Barrett	Mitsubishi Evolution
2002	David Higgins / Daniel Barrett	Subaru Impreza
2001	Mark Lovell / Michael Kidd	Subaru WRX STi
2000	Karl Scheible / Russ Hughes	Mitsubishi Evolution V
1999	Paul Choiniere / Jeff Becker	Hyundai Tiberon
1998	Frank Sprongl / Dan Sprongl	Audi Quattro S2
1997	Carl Merrill / Lance Smith	Ford Escort Cosworth
1996	Paul Choiniere / Jeff Becker	Hyundai Elantra
1995	Paul Choiniere / Jeff Becker	Hyundai Elantra
1994	Paul Choiniere / Jeff Becker	Audi Quattro S-2
1993	Paul Choiniere / Jeff Becker	Audi S-2
1992	Paul Choiniere / Jeff Becker	Audi Quattro
1991	Chad DiMarco / Erick Hauge	Subaru Legacy
1990	Jeff Zwart / Calvin Coatsworth	Mazda 323 GTX
1989	Rod Millen / Tony Sircombe	Mazda 323 GTX
1988	Rod Millen / Harry Ward	Mazda 323 GTX
1987	John Buffum / Tom Grimshaw	Audi Quattro
1986	John Buffum / Tom Grimshaw	Audi Quattro
1985	Rod Millen / John Bellefleur	Mazda RX-7 4WD
1984	John Buffum / Neil Wilson	Audi Quattro
1983	John Buffum / Doug Sheperd	Audi Quattro
1982	John Buffum / Doug Sheperd	Audi Quattro
1981	John Woolf / Grant Whittaker	Mazda RX-7
1980	John Woolf / Grant Whittaker	Mazda RX-3
1979	Rod Millen / Mark Howard	Datsun 510
1978	John Buffum / Doug Sheperd	Triumph TR-7
1977	Eric Jones / Roger Sieling	Datsun 510
