= John Buffum =

American rally driver (born 1943)

Personal information
- Nationality: (United States) American
- Born: October 4, 1943 (age 83); Wallingford, Connecticut, U.S.

World Rally Championship record
- Years active: 1973–2000
- Co-driver: (United States) Wayne Zitkus (Canada) Robin Edwardes (United States) "Vicki" (United States) Doug E. Shepherd (United States) Tom Grimshaw (United Kingdom) John Brown (United Kingdom) Ian Grindrod (United Kingdom) Neil Wilson (United Kingdom) Fred Gallagher (Canada) John Bellefleur (United Kingdom) Steve Greenhill
- Teams: Libra Racing; British Leyland; Audi; MIT Motorsport
- Rallies: 18
- Rally wins: 0
- Podiums: 2
- Total points: 38
- First rally: 1973 Press on Regardless Rally
- Last rally: 2000 Rallye de Portugal

John Buffum (born October 4, 1943, in Wallingford, Connecticut) is the most successful U.S. rally driver ever, winning 11 national titles and 117 national championship events.

== Career ==
From 1977 to 1980, when British Leyland dropped out of U.S. racing, Buffum won both the SCCA ProRally series and the North America Rally Championships. In 1981, he competed with an Audi 80 and Peugeot 504, but they were not competitive compared to Rod Millen's factory Mazda RX-7 rally cars.

In addition to his North American schedule, Buffum cherry-picked rallies in Europe, where he became the first and still the only American to win a European Rally Championship event, taking the 1983 Sachs Rally in West Germany and the 1984 Cyprus Rally, both with Audi Quattro. He also ran the 1969 Monte Carlo Rally in a Porsche 911. Buffum is the only driver in the world to compete in at least one World Rally Championship event in five continuous decades (1960's, 1970's, 1980's, 1990's and 2000).

Buffum also helped restart the Mount Washington Hillclimb Auto Race in 1990 and served as Chief Steward of the hillclimb from 1990 to 2000, again in 2011 and again in 2017.

Since the late 1980s, Buffum has owned and managed Libra Racing based in Colchester, Vermont. He has been responsible for building cars for the Hyundai Factory rally programme in the US and has worked alongside Vermont SportsCar on their Subaru Factory programme as a consultant. In 2009, he built the first open class Mitsubishi Evolution X, to campaign in the Rally America national series and the Canadian Rally series.

In 2014, Buffum was elected to the Vermont Sports Hall of Fame.

== Complete WRC results ==
| Year | Entrant | Car | 1 | 2 | 3 | 4 | 5 | 6 | 7 | 8 | 9 | 10 | 11 | 12 | 13 | 14 | WDC | Points |
|---|---|---|---|---|---|---|---|---|---|---|---|---|---|---|---|---|---|---|
| 1973 | Libra International Racing | Ford Escort RS1600 | MON | SWE | POR | KEN | MOR | GRE | POL | FIN | AUT | ITA | USA; 4 | GBR | FRA | | N/A | N/A |
| 1974 | Libra International Racing | Ford Escort RS1600 | POR | KEN | FIN | ITA | CAN | USA; Ret | GBR | FRA | | | | | | | N/A | N/A |
| 1976 | English of Bournemouth | Ford Escort RS1600 | MON | SWE | POR | KEN | GRE | MOR | FIN | ITA | FRA | GBR; Ret | | | | | N/A | N/A |
| 1977 | British Leyland | Triumph TR7 | MON | SWE | POR | KEN | NZL | GRE | FIN | CAN; 4 | ITA | FRA | GBR | | | | N/A | N/A |
| 1978 | British Leyland | Triumph TR7 | MON | SWE | KEN | POR | GRE | FIN | CAN; DSQ | ITA | CIV | FRA | | | | | N/A | N/A |
| 1978 | Spantape / Louvercurtain | Ford Escort RS1800 | | | | | | | | | | | GBR; Ret | | | | N/A | N/A |
| 1979 | British Leyland | Triumph TR8 | MON | SWE | POR | KEN | GRE | NZL | FIN | CAN | ITA | FRA | GBR; Ret | CIV | | | NC | 0 |
| 1980 | British Leyland | Triumph TR7 V8 | MON | SWE | POR | KEN | GRE | ARG | FIN | NZL | ITA | FRA | GBR; Ret | CIV | | | NC | 0 |
| 1981 | John Buffum | Triumph TR7 V8 | MON | SWE | POR | KEN | FRA | GRE | ARG | BRA | FIN | ITA | CIV | GBR; Ret | | | NC | 0 |
| 1982 | Audi Sport | Audi Quattro | MON | SWE | POR | KEN | FRA | GRE | NZL | BRA | FIN | ITA | CIV | GBR; 12 | | | NC | 0 |
| 1983 | BF Goodrich Motorsport | Audi Quattro A1 | MON | SWE | POR | KEN | FRA | GRE | NZL | ARG | FIN | ITA | CIV | GBR; 5 | | | 28th | 6 |
| 1984 | BF Goodrich Motorsport | Audi Quattro A2 | MON | SWE | POR | KEN | FRA | GRE; 5 | NZL | ARG | FIN | ITA | CIV | GBR; Ret | | | 24th | 8 |
| 1986 | Audi Sport | Audi Sport Quattro S1 | MON | SWE | POR | KEN | FRA | GRE | NZL | ARG | FIN | CIV | ITA | GBR | USA; 3 | | 18th | 12 |
| 1987 | Libra Racing | Audi Coupé Quattro | MON | SWE | POR | KEN | FRA | GRE | USA; Ret | NZL | ARG | FIN | CIV | ITA | GBR | | NC | 0 |
| 1988 | Libra Racing | Audi Coupé Quattro | MON | SWE | POR | KEN | FRA | GRE | USA; 3 | NZL | ARG | FIN | CIV | ITA | GBR | | 20th | 12 |
| 1993 | MIT Motorsport | Honda Civic SiR | MON | SWE | POR | KEN | FRA | GRE | ARG | NZL | FIN | AUS; Ret | ITA | ESP | GBR | | NC | 0 |
| 2000 | John Buffum | Mitsubishi Lancer Evo V | MON | SWE | KEN | POR; 26 | ESP | ARG | GRE | NZL | FIN | CYP | FRA | ITA | AUS | GBR | NC | 0 |
