= Ramana Lagemann =

American rally car driver

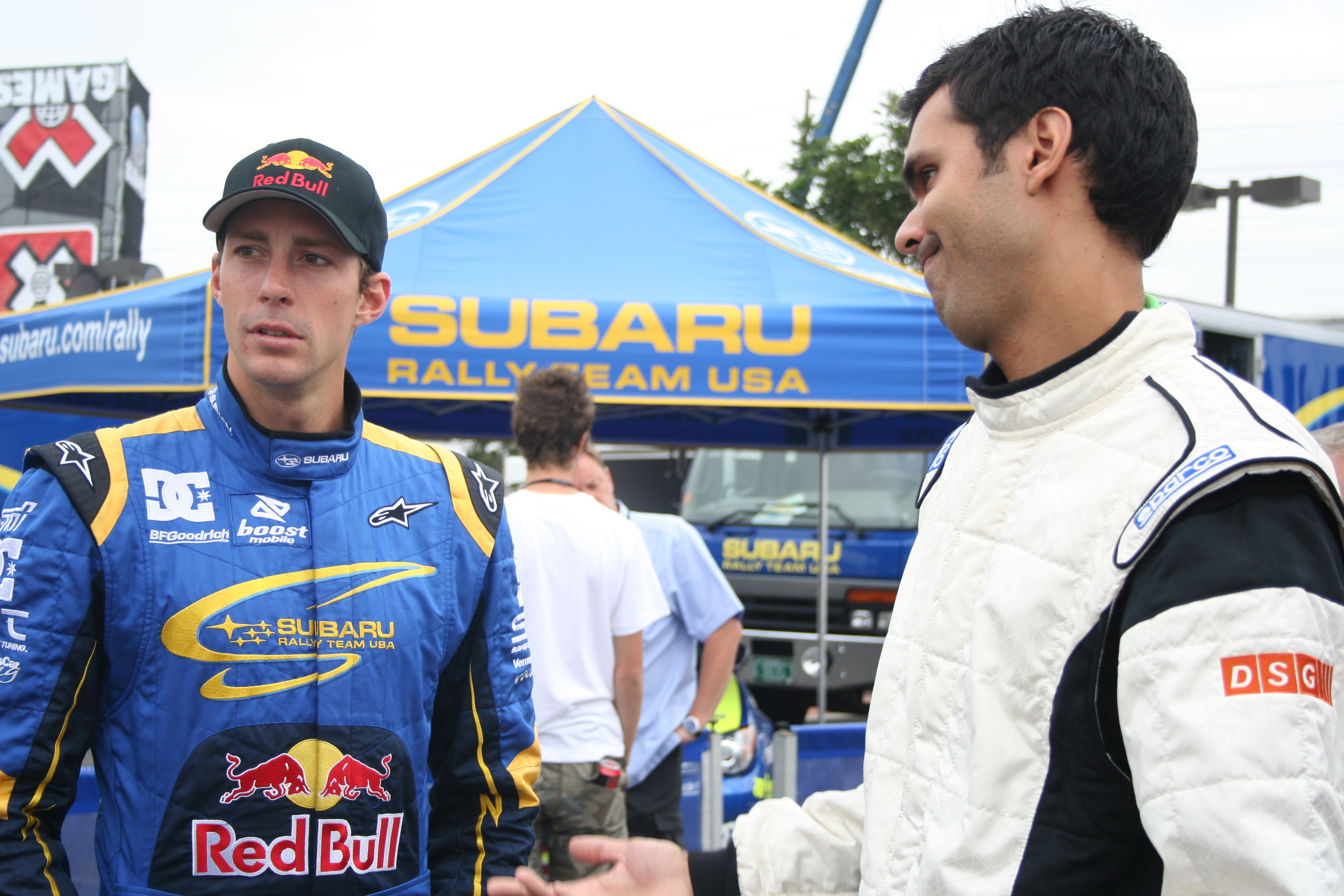

Ramana Lagemann is an American rally car driver, who started his professional career driving for Subaru of America in 2002. He remained a Subaru factory driver through 2004. He has competed at the X Games Rally in 2006 and 2007, and has multiple wins in SCCA Group N and Open class.
