= Vermont SportsCar =

Race car builder in Vermont, USA

- Type: Private
- Industry: Motorsports
- Founded: 1988; 38 years ago in Williston, Vermont
- Founder: Lance Smith
- Headquarters: Milton, Vermont
- Services: Automotive engineering; Automotive manufacturing; Car parts; Team management
- Number of employees: 70 (2024)
- Website: vtcar.com

Vermont SportsCar (VSC) is a race car manufacturer that designs, engineers, and builds rally, rallycross and other specialty vehicles for teams and private clients. Since 2006 Vermont SportsCar has been the technical partner to Subaru of America and manages the automaker's racing division Subaru Motorsports USA.

Founded by Lance Smith in 1988, VSC operates in Milton, Vermont, with more than 70 full-time employees. VSC manages motorsports programs primarily within the American Rally Association Championship, Nitro Rallycross series, and the Mount Washington Hill Climb. Additionally VSC designs, builds and campaigns the Gymkhana Subaru vehicles driven by Travis Pastrana.

VSC manufactures and sells aftermarket performance parts for Subaru vehicles under the name VSC Performance. VSC also offers prototyping and engineering services for private race teams and builds custom race and road cars.

In early 2022 VSC launched a multi-car effort in the 2022–23 Nitro Rallycross Championship’s all-electric Group E class.

== History ==
VSC was founded in 1988 by Lance Smith. A native of Williston, Vermont, Smith started as a mechanic preparing race cars for car builder and racer Tivvy Shenton and then in the 1980s for rally driver John Buffum. In 1988, he modified a Volkswagen Golf for a private team in the SCCA ProRally series and spent the next several years competing as a co-driver for several seasons in other cars he built, including a Toyota Celica, Mitsubishi Eclipse, and Mitsubishi Galant VR4. In 1992, Smith won the co-driver's championship in the North American Rally Cup and the Subaru "Pride and Professionalism" award for the best-prepped car. Smith reduced the amount of his co-driving in 1997 to focus on building a Mitsubishi Evolution V for Buffum and growing his business. In 2001 VSC supported Prodrive and Subaru of America with the launch of Subaru Rally Team USA competing in the SCCA ProRally Championship in the USA. In 2003, VSC helped manage the Mitsubishi factory rally effort in the USA and competed in the SCCA ProRally Championship utilizing Mitsubishi EVO VIII rally cars.

== Motorsport achievements ==
=== Subaru Motorsports USA ===
==== Rally America / American Rally Association ====
Race cars for multiple rally series built by VSC.

In 2006, VSC partnered again with Subaru of America to relaunch Subaru Rally Team USA and serve as the technical partner for Subaru of America's motorsports efforts. That program, rebranded in 2019 as Subaru Motorsports USA, continues today and is currently the world's largest Subaru motorsports program. In its debut 2006 season, VSC won the Rally America National Championship with driver Travis Pastrana. Additionally in 2006 VSC fielded Subaru WRX STI rally cars in the first rally car competition held by the ESPN X Games, where Pastrana beat former WRC Champion Colin McRae for the gold medal. Pastrana won the Rally America National Championship for the next three years driving alongside Subaru teammate Ken Block, who himself won 10 rallies, two X Games medals and three podiums for Subaru in Rally America. BMX rider and racer Dave Mirra replaced Block for the 2010 season. In 2011, David Higgins replaced Pastrana and went on to clinch six consecutive championships through 2016. Pastrana returned to the team in 2014 and won the 2017 Rally America and 2021 American Rally Association championships while Higgins secured another two championships in 2018 and 2019.

==== Global Rallycross / Americas Rallycross Championship ====
VSC managed the Subaru Puma Rallycross Team for the 2012-2014 seasons. Drivers included David Higgins, Dave Mirra, Sverre Isachsen, Bucky Lasek, Patrik Sandell, and Chris Atkinson. After the Global Rallycross series dissolved in the U.S., Subaru entered the Americas Rallycross Championship in 2018 where Subaru driver Patrik Sandell earned third place in the driver's championship. Scott Speed joined the Subaru team in 2019 and led the ARX Driver's Championship until a back injury sustained at the Nitro Rallycross event in Utah forced him to miss the remainder of the ARX season. The team went on to win the ARX Team's Championship in 2019, despite Speed's absence from the final two rounds (due to his injury) earning 4 wins from 6 ARX rounds.

==== Nitro Rallycross ====
After a 2020 hiatus due to the COVID-19 pandemic, VSC and Subaru Motorsports USA entered a new rallycross series spearheaded by Subaru driver Travis Pastrana and Nitro Circus. The inaugural 2021 Nitro Rallycross Championship was won by Pastrana after a close fought season with teammate Scott Speed, who finished in second in the standings after the duo was tied on points after the final round, with Pastrana winning the series based on tie-break rules; Subaru Motorsports USA won the NRX Team Championship as well.

==== Mount Washington Hill Climb ====
VSC built several record-winning cars for the Mount Washington Hill Climb, a 7.6-mile sprint to the summit of Mount Washington in New Hampshire.

David Higgins had set the record twice with a VSC-prepped Subaru: in 2014 at 6:09.09 and in 2011 at 6:11.54..

VSC entered Travis Pastrana at the wheel of the Airslayer STI, the car utilized in the Gymkhana 2020 video with Pastrana, at the 2021 Mt. Washington Hillclimb. He set a new record of 5:28.67 and broke his 5:44.72 record from 2017.

In 2026, Scott Speed set a new overall record in the Mount Washington Hillclimb in the VSC-prepped Subaru WRX Project Midnight with a time of 5:11.982.

== Championship wins ==
=== Rally America / American Rally Association ===
Year	Driver	Co-Driver
2006	(United States) Travis Pastrana	(Sweden) Christian Edstrom
2007	(United States) Travis Pastrana	(Sweden) Christian Edstrom
2008	(United States) Travis Pastrana	(United Kingdom) Derek Ringer
2009	(United States) Travis Pastrana	(United Kingdom) Derek Ringer
2011	(Isle of Man) David Higgins	(England) Craig Drew
2012	(Isle of Man) David Higgins	(England) Craig Drew
2013	(Isle of Man) David Higgins	(England) Craig Drew
2014	(Isle of Man) David Higgins	(England) Craig Drew
2015	(Isle of Man) David Higgins	(England) Craig Drew
2016	(Isle of Man) David Higgins	(England) Craig Drew
2017	(United States) Travis Pastrana	(United Kingdom) Robbie Durant
2018	(Isle of Man) David Higgins	(England) Craig Drew
2019	(Isle of Man) David Higgins	(England) Craig Drew
2021	(United States) Travis Pastrana	(Australia) Rhianon Gelsomino
2022	(Canada) Brandon Semenuk	(United Kingdom) Keaton Williams
2023	(Canada) Brandon Semenuk	(United Kingdom) Keaton Williams

=== X Games Rally / Nitro Rallycross ===
Year	Driver
X Games Rally
2006	(United States) Travis Pastrana
2008	(United States) Travis Pastrana
Nitro Rallycross Championship
2021	Travis Pastrana (USA)

== Film Appearances ==
In 2015, VSC provided their VT15R Subaru WRX STI rally car body kit to Universal Studios for the film The Fate of the Furious, the eighth release in the Fast & Furious series. The movie featured the body kit on the Subaru WRX STI driven by the character Little Nobody, played by Scott Eastwood, and was featured in an ice racing scene. The movie car was later released as a Hot Wheels scale model.

Travis Pastrana films stunts for Gymkhana 2020 in Annapolis, Maryland, in the Airslayer WRX STI.

In 2020, VSC built the Airslayer STI (internally referenced as the VT20G) for Hoonigan’s eleventh installment of the Gymkhana video series, “Gymkhana 2020,” featuring Travis Pastrana behind the wheel. Pastrana subsequently drove the Airslayer STI at the 2021 Mount Washington Hill Climb where he beat his previous record and won the event overall.

== Current rally cars ==
VSC specializes in designing and building Subaru race cars. At its Vermont shop, VSC performs nearly all facets of the build process from design to fabrication and carbon composites to wiring, engine development and paint.

Subaru WRX ARA24 Rally Car The Subaru WRX ARA24 runs in the American Rally Association Open 4WD Class. While based on the stock model, the Subaru WRX ARA24 has a 2.0-liter four-cylinder boxer engine with a custom crankshaft, pistons, connecting rods, block, heads, and turbocharger to produce 320 horsepower and 380 pound-feet of torque when fitted with a 33mm series-mandated intake restrictor. The latest rules make the car less powerful than the outgoing VT22r. A custom six-speed sequential gearbox and two limited-slip differentials handle the engine's output. Driver Brandon Semenuk and co-driver Keaton Williams won the 2023 Ojibwe Forests Rally in the VT23r, which is identical to the Subaru WRX ARA24.

VT21x

The VT21x is designed for Nitro Rallycross competition. The rear doors are sealed to accommodate a rear-mounted radiator setup due to the high likelihood of front-end damage in Rallycross racing. The 2.0-liter four-cylinder boxer engine is fitted with a larger 45mm turbo restrictor to produce more than 600 horsepower and 680 pound-feet of torque. The race weight in 2021 was a minimum of 2915 pounds.

== Custom road cars ==
Omaze Gymkhana STI

Built in tandem with the VT20g, the Omaze Gymkhana STI was a one-off road car that VSC and Hoonigan, the owner of the Gymkhana brand, donated as a prize to Omaze as part of a charity contest. The car features a custom exhaust and modified sway bars, chassis bracing, coilover springs, and a carbon fiber VSC Performance motorsport wing. It also has a unique interior featuring a rally-style hydraulic hand brake and a custom wrap inspired by the VT20g livery design.

TRAX STI & Sleigh

VSC built this 2009 STI for Ken Block and billed it as the "world's fastest cat-track operation automobile for back-country snowboarding access." VSC also built a fiberglass sleigh that can be towed by the TRAX STI.
