= Subaru Motorsports USA =

American rally team

(United States) Subaru Motorsports USA
- Founded: 2001
- Team principal(s): Lance Smith
- Current series: American Rally Association; Nitro Rallycross
- Former series: Global Rallycross; Rally America; SCCA ProRally; ARX Rallycross
- Current drivers: (United States) Travis Pastrana (United States) Scott Speed
- Noted drivers: (Isle of Man) David Higgins (Norway) Sverre Isachsen (United States) Ken Block (United States) Bucky Lasek (United States) Dave Mirra (Sweden) Patrik Sandell (Australia) Chris Atkinson (Norway) Andreas Bakkerud (Sweden) Oliver Solberg (United States) Lia Block (United States) Kyle Busch (United States) Chase Elliott (Canada) Brandon Semenuk
- Teams' Championships: 76

Subaru Motorsports USA (formerly known as Subaru Rally Team USA) is Subaru of America's motorsports arm that participates in events in the United States and its operations are managed by Vermont SportsCar, previously Prodrive.

== History ==
The team was started in 2000 with cars prepared by Prodrive and raced in the SCCA ProRally championship and continued until 2004. In 2006, the team management was handed over to Vermont SportsCar.

Since 2001 Vermont SportsCar has had a relationship with Subaru of America who has served as both a sponsor and partner. Subaru utilizes the sport of rallying to promote their line-up of all-wheel drive vehicles, specifically the Subaru Impreza WRX STI which has dominated rallying in both the US and internationally for decades.

Starting in 2006 Vermont SportsCar began managing the operations of Subaru Rally Team USA. In their first year Vermont SportsCar took Subaru Rally Team USA to four straight Rally America National Championship driver's titles with driver Travis Pastrana (2006-2009).

In 2010 the team welcomed Dave Mirra to a full-time role as the team's 2nd driver alongside Pastrana, who was participating in a limited schedule of events. In 2011 Pastrana left the team to pursue NASCAR and was replaced by multi-time British and American rally champion David Higgins. Alongside his co-driver Craig Drew, David drove his WRX STI to 8 National Championships in a 9-year span, including a Perfect Season in 2015. Pastrana made a return to the team in 2014 and continues to be their main driver for stage rally competition with the American Rally Association.

The team utilizes the Subaru WRX STI and rally prepares the cars almost entirely in-house at Vermont SportsCar, including the shell prep, roll cages, engines and many of the composite parts. The same rally technicians that build each of team's cars also serve as the service crew that travel to each event.

Although they primarily compete in the American Rally Association National Championship and Americas Rallycross Championship (ARX), the team also competes occasionally in the Canadian Rally Championship, the X Games and the World Rally Championship.

In 2019, the team changed its name to Subaru Motorsports USA along with a revision to the structure of its U.S. racing activities, which now combines stage rally, rallycross, record attempts, off-road racing, and circuit racing under the banner of Subaru Motorsports. Subaru Motorsports USA has been a seminal force in the rise in popularity of rallying in North America.

== Rally ==
Subaru Rally Team USA participated in Rally America events, Canadian Rally Championship events, and previously participated in the World Rally Championship for a short time. Since taking on the American rally stages they have amassed 15 National Championships (6 with Pastrana, 8 with Higgins). Occasionally, the team has made entries in WRC with Ramana Lagemann at Rally New Zealand in 2003 and David Higgins at Rally GB in 2015.

After four consecutive Rally America driver's championships by Travis Pastrana from 2006–2009, David Higgins took over as the team's lead driver in Rally America competition for the 2011 season. From 2011–2016 Higgins won six consecutive championships, including a perfect season in 2015 in which he and co-driver Craig Drew won all eight rallies on the calendar.

In 2020, after several years with David Higgins as lead driver and occasional part- or full-season campaigns from Travis Pastrana or other guest drivers, Subaru announced a new two-car lineup with Pastrana partnering with Canadian freeride mountain bike athlete and rally driver Brandon Semenuk.

After a shortened 2020 rally season in which Subaru Motorsports USA failed to win the U.S. rally title for the first time since 2010, the team returned to the top spot in 2021 as Travis Pastrana captured his sixth title and first alongside co-driver Rhianon Gelsomino. Semenuk finished third overall behind Ken Block competing in an independent Vermont SportsCar-prepared Subaru WRX STI run by Hoonigan Racing Division.

The 2021 championship marked the emergence of Brandon Semenuk and co-driver Keaton Williams in a season-long battle with rivals Ken Block and Alex Gelsomino competing in a modified Hyundai i20 WRC. Semenuk would ultimately win the title in the final rally of the season, earning his first major rally title.

== Rallycross ==
The team participated in the Global RallyCross Championship and X-Games events until they were replaced by the Americas Rallycross Championship in 2018. In 2006 and 2007, Colin McRae participated in X-Games with the team. He rolled the car due to an awkwardly landed jump, but still managed to finish in second place, right behind Travis Pastrana.

On May 4, 2012, Subaru announced their partnership with Puma and their new rallycross team, Subaru Puma Rallycross Team USA. The three-driver team consisted of Dave Mirra, Bucky Lasek, and Sverre Isachsen. On September 11, 2013, SRT USA contracted their Global Rallycross effort to two cars, releasing Dave Mirra. The team eventually made a shift in their lineup switching out Lasek and Isachsen with global rallycross star Patrik Sandell and former Subaru World Rally Team driver Chris Atkinson before the Global RallyCross Championship ended in 2017.

In 2018 IMG founded the Americas Rallycross Championship which effectively replaced GRC. Sandell and Atkinson continued with the team during the transition and added Scott Speed to the roster the following year.

In 2019, Sandell, Atkinson and Speed combined for four Americas Rallycross Championship event victories and won the ARX Teams Championship, the first rallycross championship for Subaru. After the 2019 season, series promoter IMG announced that ARX would cease operations.

After a 2020 season in which no rallycross events were held due to the COVID-19 pandemic, Subaru Motorsports USA returned to rallycross in 2021 for the first season of the Nitro Rallycross (NRX) series with drivers Scott Speed and Travis Pastrana. Pastrana and Speed scored three wins out of five events and tied on points for the NRX driver's championship ahead of Timmy Hansen, with Pastrana being named champion due to the series' tiebreak rules.

== Championship wins ==
Season	Driver	Co-Driver
2001	(United Kingdom) Mark Lovell	(United States) Frank Cunningham
2006	(United States) Travis Pastrana	(Sweden) Christian Edstrom
2007	(United States) Travis Pastrana	(Sweden) Christian Edstrom
2008	(United States) Travis Pastrana	(United Kingdom) Derek Ringer
2009	(United States) Travis Pastrana	(United Kingdom) Derek Ringer
2011	(Isle of Man) David Higgins	(England) Craig Drew
2012	(Isle of Man) David Higgins	(England) Craig Drew
2013	(Isle of Man) David Higgins	(England) Craig Drew
2014	(Isle of Man) David Higgins	(England) Craig Drew
2015	(Isle of Man) David Higgins	(England) Craig Drew
2016	(Isle of Man) David Higgins	(England) Craig Drew
2017	(United States) Travis Pastrana	(United Kingdom) Robbie Durant
2018	(Isle of Man) David Higgins	(England) Craig Drew
2019	(Isle of Man) David Higgins	(England) Craig Drew
2021	(United States) Travis Pastrana	(Australia) Rhianon Gelsomino
2022	(Canada) Brandon Semenuk	(United Kingdom) Keaton Williams
2023	(Canada) Brandon Semenuk	(United Kingdom) Keaton Williams
2024	(Canada) Brandon Semenuk	(United Kingdom) Keaton Williams
2025	(Canada) Brandon Semenuk	(United Kingdom) Keaton Williams

== Video games ==
SRT USA heavily appeared in the racing game Colin McRae: DiRT 2 with 2008 drivers Ken Block, Travis Pastrana, and Dave Mirra. The #199 and #40 SRT USA cars also appeared in DiRT 3 Ramana Lagemann's SCCA ProRally #4 rally car appears on the cover Colin McRae Rally 2005. SRT USA cars also are included in RalliSport Challenge, RalliSport Challenge 2, Colin McRae Rally 04, Project Gotham Racing, V-Rally 3, Sega Rally 2006, Enthusia Professional Racing, and Sega Rally Revo. In 2016 both Travis Pastrana and David Higgins appeared in Forza Horizon 3, as DLC.

Despite the fact that SRT USA vehicles were heavily featured in rally video games instead of the one used by the WRC, this is mostly due to licensing issues as WRC had the rights to their own video games at that time which were developed by Evolution Studios.

== Racing record ==
=== Complete Global Rallycross Championship results ===
(key)

==== AWD ====
Year	Entrant	Car	No.	Driver	1	2	3	4	5	6	7	8	GRC	Points
2011	Subaru Rally Team USA	Subaru Impreza GR WRX STI	40	(United States) Dave Mirra	IRW1	IRW2	SEA1; 5	SEA2; 6	PIK1	PIK2	LA1; 6	LA2; 5	8th	57
2011	Subaru Rally Team USA	Subaru Impreza GR WRX STI	75	(Isle of Man) David Higgins	IRW1	IRW2	SEA1	SEA2	PIK1; 4	PIK2; 2	LA1; 3	LA2; 7	7th	57
2011	Subaru Rally Team USA	Subaru Impreza GR WRX STI	199	(United States) Travis Pastrana	IRW1	IRW2	SEA1	SEA2	PIK1	PIK2	LA1	LA2; 4	19th	13

==== Supercar ====
Year	Entrant	Car	No.	Driver	1	2	3	4	5	6	7	8	9	10	11	12	GRC	Points
2012	Subaru Puma Rallycross Team USA	Subaru Impreza WRX STI	11	(Norway) Sverre Isachsen	CHA; 12	TEX; 10	LA; 10	LOU; 13	LV; 3	LVC; 12							9th	40
2012	Subaru Puma Rallycross Team USA	Subaru Impreza WRX STI	40	(United States) Dave Mirra	CHA; 9	TEX; 11	LA; 15	LOU; 10	LV; 13	LVC; 6							12th	35
2012	Subaru Puma Rallycross Team USA	Subaru Impreza WRX STI	75	(Isle of Man) David Higgins	CHA	TEX	LA; 7	LOU	LV	LVC							19th	10
2012	Subaru Puma Rallycross Team USA	Subaru Impreza WRX STI	81	(United States) Bucky Lasek	CHA; 11	TEX; 14	LA; 13	LOU; 11	LV; 8	LVC; 7							13th	35
2013	Subaru Puma Rallycross Team USA	Subaru Impreza WRX STI	11	(Norway) Sverre Isachsen	BRA	MUN1; 17	MUN2; 8	LOU; 6	BRI; 4	IRW; 3	ATL; 3	CHA; 8	LV; 5				7th	86
2013	Subaru Puma Rallycross Team USA	Subaru Impreza WRX STI	40	(United States) Dave Mirra	BRA	MUN1; 15	MUN2; 14	LOU; 13	BRI; 11	IRW; 15	ATL; 4	CHA; 12	LV; DNS				12th	36
2013	Subaru Puma Rallycross Team USA	Subaru Impreza WRX STI	81	(United States) Bucky Lasek	BRA	MUN1; 14	MUN2; 11	LOU; 8	BRI; 12	IRW; 11	ATL; 12	CHA; 16	LV; 14				11th	49
2014	Subaru Rally Team USA	Subaru Impreza WRX STI	11	(Norway) Sverre Isachsen	BAR; 6	AUS; 15	DC; 10	NY; 8	CHA; 2	DAY; 5	LA1; 10	LA2; 4	SEA; 1	LV; 5			5th	280
2014	Subaru Rally Team USA	Subaru Impreza WRX STI	81	(United States) Bucky Lasek	BAR; 13	AUS; 2	DC; 11	NY; 12	CHA; 6	DAY; 3	LA1; 11	LA2; 5	SEA; 14	LV; 3			8th	215
2014	Subaru Rally Team USA	Subaru Impreza WRX STI	199	(United States) Travis Pastrana	BAR	AUS; 7	DC	NY	CHA	DAY	LA1	LA2	SEA	LV			NC	-
2015	Subaru Rally Team USA	Subaru Impreza WRX STI	11	(Norway) Sverre Isachsen	FTA; 9	DAY1; 10	DAY2; 11	MCAS; 6	DET1; 12	DET2; 12	DC	LA1; 4	LA2; 13	BAR1; 7	BAR2; 12	LV; 14	11th	136
2015	Subaru Rally Team USA	Subaru Impreza WRX STI	81	(United States) Bucky Lasek	FTA; 10	DAY1; DNS	DAY2; 12	MCAS; 7	DET1; 11	DET2; 8	DC	LA1; DNS	LA2; DNS	BAR1	BAR2	LV; 8	12th	88
2015	Subaru Rally Team USA	Subaru Impreza WRX STI	199	(United States) Travis Pastrana	FTA	DAY1	DAY2	MCAS	DET1	DET2	DC	LA1; 7	LA2; 6	BAR1	BAR2	LV	NC	NC
2016	Subaru Rally Team USA	Subaru Impreza WRX STI	11	(Norway) Sverre Isachsen	PHO1	PHO2	DAL	DAY1	DAY2	MCAS1; 11	MCAS2; C	DC; 11	AC; 9	SEA	LA1	LA2	17th	19
2016	Subaru Rally Team USA	Subaru Impreza WRX STI	55	(Australia) Chris Atkinson	PHO1	PHO2	DAL	DAY1	DAY2	MCAS1	MCAS2; C	DC	AC; 11	SEA; 6	LA1; 7	LA2; 7	11th	88
2016	Subaru Rally Team USA	Subaru Impreza WRX STI	75	(Isle of Man) David Higgins	PHO1	PHO2	DAL	DAY1	DAY2	MCAS1	MCAS2; C	DC	AC	SEA; 9	LA1; 6	LA2; 9	13th	57
2016	Subaru Rally Team USA	Subaru Impreza WRX STI	81	(United States) Bucky Lasek	PHO1	PHO2	DAL	DAY1	DAY2	MCAS1; 10	MCAS2; C	DC; 9	AC; 10	SEA	LA1	LA2	15th	34
2016	Subaru Rally Team USA	Subaru Impreza WRX STI	88	(Japan) Toshi Arai	PHO1	PHO2	DAL	DAY1	DAY2	MCAS1	MCAS2; C	DC	AC	SEA	LA1; 13	LA2; 13	19th	4
2017	Subaru Rally Team USA	Subaru Impreza WRX STI	18	(Sweden) Patrik Sandell	MEM; 9	LOU	THO1; 6	THO2; 5	OTT1; 9	OTT2; 7	INDY; 8	AC1; 9	AC2; 10	SEA1; 7	SEA2; 3	LA; 3	8th	582
2017	Subaru Rally Team USA	Subaru Impreza WRX STI	55	(Australia) Chris Atkinson	MEM; 9	LOU	THO1; 7	THO2; 3	OTT1; 4	OTT2; 9	INDY; 8	AC1; 9	AC2; 4	SEA1; 3	SEA2; 5	LA; 9	7th	585

=== Complete Nitro Rallycross results ===
==== Supercar ====
Year	Entrant	Car	No.	Driver	1	2	3	4	5	Pos	Points
2021	Subaru Motorsports USA	Subaru WRX STi	13	(Norway) Andreas Bakkerud	UMC; 9	ERX; 6	WHP	HLN; 3	FIR	8th	71
2021	Subaru Motorsports USA	Subaru WRX STi	41	(United States) Scott Speed	UMC; 5	ERX; 1	WHP; 3	HLN; 2	FIR; 3	2nd	219
2021	Subaru Motorsports USA	Subaru WRX STi	199	(United States) Travis Pastrana	UMC; 6	ERX; 2	WHP; 1	HLN; 1	FIR; 4	1st	219
2021	ZipRecruiter #GONITRO	Subaru WRX STi	9A	(United States) Chase Elliott	UMC	ERX	WHP	HLN	FIR; 8	15th	15
2021	ZipRecruiter #GONITRO	Subaru WRX STi	51	(United States) Kyle Busch	UMC	ERX	WHP; 4	HLN	FIR	11th	35
