= LSPR =

LSPR may refer to:

- Surface plasmon resonance or also called localized surface plasmon resonance
- Latvian Socialist Soviet Republic (in Latvian: Latvijas Sociālistiskā Padomju Republika)
- Lake Superior Performance Rally, a rally race held in Michigan
- Puerto Rican Sign Language, known in Spanish as Lengua de señas puertorriqueña
