= 2022 Ypres Rally =

58th edition of Ypres Rally

2022 Ypres Rally Ardeca Ypres Rally 2022
Round 9 of 13 in the 2022 World Rally Championship
← Previous event	Next event →
- Host country: Belgium
- Rally base: Ypres, West Flanders
- Dates run: 18 – 21 August 2022
- Start location: Vleteren, West Flanders
- Finish location: Kemmelberg, Flanders
- Stages: 20 (281.58 km; 174.97 miles)
- Stage surface: Tarmac
- Transport distance: 405.66 km (252.07 miles)
- Overall distance: 687.24 km (427.03 miles)

Statistics
- Crews registered: 88
- Crews: 85 at start, 69 at finish

Overall results
- Overall winner: (Estonia) Ott Tänak (Estonia) Martin Järveoja (South Korea) Hyundai Shell Mobis WRT; 2:25:38.9
- Power Stage winner: (Finland) Kalle Rovanperä (Finland) Jonne Halttunen (Japan) Toyota Gazoo Racing WRT; 6:58.6

Support category results
- WRC-2 winner: (France) Stéphane Lefebvre (France) Andy Malfoy; 2:35:24.6
- WRC-3 winner: (Czech Republic) Jan Černý (United Kingdom) Tom Woodburn; 2:53:14.2

The 2022 Ypres Rally (also known as the Ardeca Ypres Rally 2022) was a motor racing event for rally cars that was held over four days between 18 and 21 August 2022. It marked the fifty-eighth running of the Ypres Rally. The event was the ninth round of the 2022 World Rally Championship, World Rally Championship-2 and World Rally Championship-3. The 2022 event was based in Ypres in West Flanders and was contested over twenty special stages covering a total competitive distance of 281.58 km (174.97 mi).

Thierry Neuville and Martijn Wydaeghe were the defending rally winners. Their team, Hyundai Shell Mobis WRT, were the defending manufacturers' winners. Jari Huttunen and Mikko Lukka were the defending rally winners in the WRC-2 category. Yohan Rossel and Alexandre Coria were the defending rally winners in the WRC-3 category, but neither of them defended their titles as Rossel stepped up to WRC-2, while Coria moved to the top-tier to co-drive with Adrien Fourmaux for M-Sport.

Ott Tänak and Martin Järveoja won their third rally of the season. Their team, Hyundai Shell Mobis WRT, successfully defended their title. Stéphane Lefebvre and Andy Malfoy won the World Rally Championship-2 category. Jan Černý and Tom Woodburn won the World Rally Championship-3 category.

== Background ==
=== Entry list ===
The following crews entered into the rally. The event was opened to crews competing in the World Rally Championship, its support categories, the World Rally Championship-2 and World Rally Championship-3, and privateer entries that are not registered to score points in any championship. Ten entered under Rally1 regulations, as were twenty-one Rally2 crews in the World Rally Championship-2 and three Rally3 crews in the World Rally Championship-3.

Rally1 entries competing in the World Rally Championship
No.	Driver	Co-Driver	Entrant	Car	Championship eligibility	Tyre
2	(Sweden) Oliver Solberg	(United Kingdom) Elliott Edmondson	(South Korea) Hyundai Shell Mobis WRT	Hyundai i20 N Rally1	Driver, Co-driver, Manufacturer	P
4	(Finland) Esapekka Lappi	(Finland) Janne Ferm	(Japan) Toyota Gazoo Racing WRT	Toyota GR Yaris Rally1	Driver, Co-driver, Manufacturer	P
8	(Estonia) Ott Tänak	(Estonia) Martin Järveoja	(South Korea) Hyundai Shell Mobis WRT	Hyundai i20 N Rally1	Driver, Co-driver, Manufacturer	P
11	(Belgium) Thierry Neuville	(Belgium) Martijn Wydaeghe	(South Korea) Hyundai Shell Mobis WRT	Hyundai i20 N Rally1	Driver, Co-driver, Manufacturer	P
16	(France) Adrien Fourmaux	(France) Alexandre Coria	(United Kingdom) M-Sport Ford WRT	Ford Puma Rally1	Driver, Co-driver, Manufacturer	P
18	(Japan) Takamoto Katsuta	(Republic of Ireland) Aaron Johnston	(Japan) Toyota Gazoo Racing WRT NG	Toyota GR Yaris Rally1	Driver, Co-driver, Manufacturer/Team	P
33	(United Kingdom) Elfyn Evans	(United Kingdom) Scott Martin	(Japan) Toyota Gazoo Racing WRT	Toyota GR Yaris Rally1	Driver, Co-driver, Manufacturer	P
42	(Republic of Ireland) Craig Breen	(Republic of Ireland) Paul Nagle	(United Kingdom) M-Sport Ford WRT	Ford Puma Rally1	Driver, Co-driver, Manufacturer	P
44	(United Kingdom) Gus Greensmith	(Sweden) Jonas Andersson	(United Kingdom) M-Sport Ford WRT	Ford Puma Rally1	Driver, Co-driver, Manufacturer	P
69	(Finland) Kalle Rovanperä	(Finland) Jonne Halttunen	(Japan) Toyota Gazoo Racing WRT	Toyota GR Yaris Rally1	Driver, Co-driver, Manufacturer	P

Rally2 entries competing in the World Rally Championship-2
No.	Driver	Co-Driver	Entrant	Car	Championship eligibility	Tyre
20	(Norway) Andreas Mikkelsen	(Norway) Torstein Eriksen	(Germany) Toksport WRT	Škoda Fabia Rally2 evo	Driver, Co-driver, Team	P
21	(France) Yohan Rossel	(France) Valentin Sarreaud	(France) PH Sport	Citroën C3 Rally2	Driver, Co-driver	P
23	(Finland) Jari Huttunen	(Finland) Mikko Lukka	(United Kingdom) M-Sport Ford WRT	Ford Fiesta Rally2	Driver, Co-driver	P
24	(France) Stéphane Lefebvre	(France) Andy Malfoy	(France) Stéphane Lefebvre	Citroën C3 Rally2	Driver, Co-driver	P
25	(Luxembourg) Grégoire Munster	(Belgium) Louis Louka	(Luxembourg) Grégoire Munster	Hyundai i20 N Rally2	Junior Driver, Junior Co-driver	P
26	(Belgium) Vincent Verschueren	(Belgium) Filip Cuvelier	(Belgium) Vincent Verschueren	Volkswagen Polo GTI R5	Driver, Co-driver	P
27	(Belgium) Davy Vanneste	(Belgium) Kris D'alleine	(Belgium) Davy Vanneste	Citroën C3 Rally2	Driver, Co-driver	P
28	(Belgium) Freddy Loix	(Belgium) Pieter Tsjoen	(Belgium) Freddy Loix	Škoda Fabia Rally2 evo	Masters Driver, Co-driver	P
29	(Bolivia) Marco Bulacia	(Spain) Diego Vallejo	(Germany) Toksport WRT	Škoda Fabia Rally2 evo	Junior Driver, Co-driver, Team	P
30	(Belgium) Pieter Jan Michiel Cracco	(Belgium) Jasper Vermeulen	(Belgium) Pieter Jan Michiel Cracco	Hyundai i20 N Rally2	Junior Driver, Junior Co-driver	P
31	(United Kingdom) Chris Ingram	(United Kingdom) Craig Drew	(United Kingdom) Chris Ingram	Škoda Fabia Rally2 evo	Junior Driver, Co-driver	P
32	(Republic of Ireland) Josh McErlean	(Republic of Ireland) James Fulton	(Republic of Ireland) Josh McErlean	Hyundai i20 N Rally2	Junior Driver, Junior Co-driver	P
34	(Belgium) Niels Reynvoet	(Belgium) Diederik Pattyn	(Belgium) Niels Reynvoet	Škoda Fabia Rally2 evo	Driver, Co-driver	P
36	(Germany) Armin Kremer	(Germany) Timo Gottschalk	(Germany) Armin Kremer	Škoda Fabia Rally2 evo	Masters Driver, Co-driver	P
37	(Switzerland) Olivier Burri	(France) Anderson Levratti	(Switzerland) Olivier Burri	Hyundai i20 N Rally2	Masters Driver, Co-driver	P
38	(United Kingdom) Neil Simpson	(United Kingdom) Michael Gibson	(United Kingdom) Neil Simpson	Škoda Fabia Rally2 evo	Driver, Co-driver	P
39	(Japan) Osamu Fukunaga	(Japan) Misako Saida	(Japan) Osamu Fukunaga	Škoda Fabia Rally2 evo	Masters Driver, Co-driver	P
40	(Republic of Ireland) Eamonn Boland	(Republic of Ireland) Michael Joseph Morrissey	(Republic of Ireland) Eamonn Boland	Ford Fiesta Rally2	Masters Driver, Masters Co-driver	P
41	(Spain) Miguel Díaz-Aboitiz	(Spain) Jordi Hereu	(Spain) Miguel Díaz-Aboitiz	Škoda Fabia Rally2 evo	Masters Driver, Co-driver	P
43	(Netherlands) Henk Vossen	(Netherlands) Hans van Goor	(Netherlands) Henk Vossen	Ford Fiesta R5	Masters Driver, Masters Co-driver	P
50	(Belgium) Sébastien Bedoret	(France) François Gilbert	(Belgium) Sébastien Bedoret	Škoda Fabia Rally2 evo	Junior Driver, Co-driver	P

Rally3 entries competing in the World Rally Championship-3
No.	Driver	Co-Driver	Entrant	Car	Championship eligibility	Tyre
45	(Czech Republic) Jan Černý	(United Kingdom) Tom Woodburn	(Czech Republic) Jan Černý	Ford Fiesta Rally3	Open	P
46	(Italy) Enrico Brazzoli	(Italy) Manuel Fenoli	(Italy) Enrico Brazzoli	Ford Fiesta Rally3	Open	P
47	(Hungary) Zoltán László	(Hungary) Tamás Kürti	(Hungary) Zoltán László	Ford Fiesta Rally3	Open	P

Other major entries
No.	Driver	Co-Driver	Entrant	Car	Tyre
22	Nikolay Gryazin (Note: Nikolay Gryazin is Russian, but he competes as a neutral competitor using the ANA flag as Russian national emblems were banned by the association due to the Russian invasion of Ukraine.)	Konstantin Aleksandrov (Note: Konstantin Aleksandrov is Russian, but he competes as a neutral competitor using the ANA flag as Russian national emblems were banned by the association due to the Russian invasion of Ukraine.)	(Germany) Toksport WRT 2	Škoda Fabia Rally2 evo	P
35	(Estonia) Georg Linnamäe	(United Kingdom) James Morgan	(Estonia) ALM Motorsport	Volkswagen Polo GTI R5	P
48	(Belgium) Gino Bux	(Belgium) Nicolas Gilsoul	(Belgium) East Belgian Racing Team	Škoda Fabia Rally2 evo	P
49	(Belgium) Maxime Potty	(Belgium) Renaud Herman	(Belgium) Maxime Potty	Citroën C3 Rally2	P
51	(Netherlands) Jos Verstappen	(Netherlands) Harm van Koppen	(Netherlands) Jos Verstappen	Citroën C3 Rally2	P
58	(Finland) Sami Pajari	(Finland) Enni Mälkönen	(Finland) Sami Pajari	Ford Fiesta Rally3	P

=== Itinerary ===
All dates and times are CEST (UTC+2).

Date	Time	No.	Stage name	Distance
18 August	16:01	—	Nieuwkerke [Shakedown]	7.34 km
19 August	10:16	SS1	Vleteren 1	11.97 km
19 August	11:08	SS2	Westouter-Boeschepe 1	19.60 km
19 August	12:03	SS3	Mesen-Middelhoek 1	7.99 km
19 August	12:53	SS4	Langemark 1	8.95 km
19 August	15:16	SS5	Vleteren 2	11.97 km
19 August	16:08	SS6	Westouter-Boeschepe 2	19.60 km
19 August	17:03	SS7	Mesen-Middelhoek 2	7.99 km
19 August	17:53	SS8	Langemark 2	8.95 km
20 August	10:13	SS9	Reninge 1	15.00 km
20 August	11:08	SS10	Dikkebus 1	14.29 km
20 August	12:00	SS11	Wijtschate 1	15.00 km
20 August	12:55	SS12	Hollebeke 1	22.32 km
20 August	15:13	SS13	Reninge 2	15.00 km
20 August	16:08	SS14	Dikkebus 2	14.29 km
20 August	17:00	SS15	Wijtschate 2	15.00 km
20 August	17:55	SS16	Hollebeke 2	22.32 km
21 August	8:43	SS17	Watou 1	12.36 km
21 August	9:38	SS18	Kemmelberg 1	13.31 km
21 August	11:49	SS19	Watou 2	12.36 km
21 August	13:18	SS20	Kemmelberg 2 [Power Stage]	13.31 km

== Report ==
=== WRC Rally1 ===
==== Classification ====
Position		No.	Driver	Co-driver	Entrant	Car	Time	Difference	Points	
Event	Class	No.	Driver	Co-driver	Entrant	Car	Time	Difference	Event	Stage
1	1	8	Ott Tänak	Martin Järveoja	Hyundai Shell Mobis WRT	Hyundai i20 N Rally1	2:25:38.9	0.0	25	2
2	2	33	Elfyn Evans	Scott Martin	Toyota Gazoo Racing WRT	Toyota GR Yaris Rally1	2:25:43.9	+5.0	18	4
3	3	4	Esapekka Lappi	Janne Ferm	Toyota Gazoo Racing WRT	Toyota GR Yaris Rally1	2:27:20.5	+1:41.6	15	0
4	4	2	Oliver Solberg	Elliott Edmondson	Hyundai Shell Mobis WRT	Hyundai i20 N Rally1	2:29:07.4	+3:28.5	12	0
5	5	18	Takamoto Katsuta	Aaron Johnston	Toyota Gazoo Racing WRT NG	Toyota GR Yaris Rally1	2:31:45.0	+6:06.1	10	1
19	6	44	Gus Greensmith	Jonas Andersson	M-Sport Ford WRT	Ford Puma Rally1	2:44:19.3	+18:40.4	0	0
20	7	11	Thierry Neuville	Martijn Wydaeghe	Hyundai Shell Mobis WRT	Hyundai i20 N Rally1	2:45:29.4	+19:50.5	0	3
62	8	69	Kalle Rovanperä	Jonne Halttunen	Toyota Gazoo Racing WRT	Toyota GR Yaris Rally1	3:36:08.4	+1:10:29.5	0	5
63	9	42	Craig Breen	Paul Nagle	M-Sport Ford WRT	Ford Puma Rally1	3:36:38.3	+1:10:59.4	0	0
Retired SS19		16	Adrien Fourmaux	Alexandre Coria	M-Sport Ford WRT	Ford Puma Rally1	Off-road		0	0

==== Special stages ====
Stage	Winners	Car	Time	Class leaders
SD	Neuville / Wydaeghe	Hyundai i20 N Rally1	3:44.4	—N/a
SS1	Rovanperä / Halttunen	Toyota GR Yaris Rally1	6:08.2	Rovanperä / Halttunen
SS2	Neuville / Wydaeghe	Hyundai i20 N Rally1	10:07.5	Evans / Martin
SS3	Tänak / Järveoja	Hyundai i20 N Rally1	4:23.1	Evans / Martin
SS4	Evans / Martin	Toyota GR Yaris Rally1	4:13.5	Evans / Martin
SS5	Tänak / Järveoja; Neuville / Wydaeghe	Hyundai i20 N Rally1; Hyundai i20 N Rally1	6:10.8	Evans / Martin
SS6	Neuville / Wydaeghe	Hyundai i20 N Rally1	10:03.6	Evans / Martin
SS7	Neuville / Wydaeghe	Hyundai i20 N Rally1	4:18.9	Neuville / Wydaeghe
SS8	Neuville / Wydaeghe	Hyundai i20 N Rally1	4:12.6	Neuville / Wydaeghe
SS9	Rovanperä / Halttunen	Toyota GR Yaris Rally1	7:48.8	Tänak / Järveoja
SS10	Stage interrupted			
SS11	Neuville / Wydaeghe	Hyundai i20 N Rally1	7:21.1	Neuville / Wydaeghe
SS12	Neuville / Wydaeghe	Hyundai i20 N Rally1	11:30.9	Neuville / Wydaeghe
SS13	Neuville / Wydaeghe	Hyundai i20 N Rally1	7:51.1	Neuville / Wydaeghe
SS14	Evans / Martin	Toyota GR Yaris Rally1	7:38.6	Neuville / Wydaeghe
SS15	Tänak / Järveoja	Hyundai i20 N Rally1	7:19.2	Tänak / Järveoja
SS16	Tänak / Järveoja	Hyundai i20 N Rally1	11:29.1	Tänak / Järveoja
SS17	Evans / Martin	Toyota GR Yaris Rally1	6:18.7	Tänak / Järveoja
SS18	Evans / Martin	Toyota GR Yaris Rally1	7:02.8	Tänak / Järveoja
SS19	Tänak / Järveoja	Hyundai i20 N Rally1	6:18.8	Tänak / Järveoja
SS20	Rovanperä / Halttunen	Toyota GR Yaris Rally1	6:58.6	Tänak / Järveoja

==== Championship standings ====
Pos.	Drivers' championships			Co-drivers' championships			Manufacturers' championships		
Pos.	Move	Driver	Points	Move	Co-driver	Points	Move	Manufacturer	Points
1		Kalle Rovanperä	203		Jonne Halttunen	203		Toyota Gazoo Racing WRT	381
2		Ott Tänak	131		Martin Järveoja	131		Hyundai Shell Mobis WRT	293
3	1	Elfyn Evans	116	1	Scott Martin	116		M-Sport Ford WRT	188
4	1	Thierry Neuville	106	1	Martijn Wydaeghe	106		Toyota Gazoo Racing WRT NG	100
5		Takamoto Katsuta	92		Aaron Johnston	92			

=== WRC-2 Rally2 ===
==== Classification ====
Position		No.	Driver	Co-driver	Entrant	Car	Time	Difference	Points		
Event	Class	No.	Driver	Co-driver	Entrant	Car	Time	Difference	Class	Stage	Event
6	1	24	Stéphane Lefebvre	Andy Malfoy	Stéphane Lefebvre	Citroën C3 Rally2	2:35:24.6	0.0	25	1	8
7	2	20	Andreas Mikkelsen	Torstein Eriksen	Toksport WRT	Škoda Fabia Rally2 evo	2:35:42.7	+18.1	18	3	6
8	3	21	Yohan Rossel	Valentin Sarreaud	PH Sport	Citroën C3 Rally2	2:36:33.7	+1:09.1	15	2	4
9	4	31	Chris Ingram	Craig Drew	Chris Ingram	Škoda Fabia Rally2 evo	2:36:59.7	+1:35.1	12	0	2
11	5	25	Grégoire Munster	Louis Louka	Grégoire Munster	Hyundai i20 N Rally2	2:37:07.8	+1:43.2	10	0	0
12	6	26	Vincent Verschueren	Filip Cuvelier	Vincent Verschueren	Volkswagen Polo GTI R5	2:38:19.0	+2:54.4	8	0	0
15	7	50	Sébastien Bedoret	François Gilbert	Sébastien Bedoret	Škoda Fabia Rally2 evo	2:39:04.0	+3:39.4	6	0	0
16	8	36	Armin Kremer	Timo Gottschalk	Armin Kremer	Škoda Fabia Rally2 evo	2:41:07.2	+5:42.6	4	0	0
17	9	28	Freddy Loix	Pieter Tsjoen	Freddy Loix	Škoda Fabia Rally2 evo	2:41:31.3	+6:06.7	2	0	0
18	10	27	Davy Vanneste	Kris D'alleine	Davy Vanneste	Citroën C3 Rally2	2:42:58.0	+7:33.4	1	0	0
21	11	29	Marco Bulacia	Diego Vallejo	Toksport WRT	Škoda Fabia Rally2 evo	2:45:47.0	+10:22.4	0	0	0
24	12	34	Niels Reynvoet	Diederik Pattyn	Niels Reynvoet	Škoda Fabia Rally2 evo	2:47:25.4	+12:00.8	0	0	0
28	13	38	Neil Simpson	Michael Gibson	Neil Simpson	Škoda Fabia Rally2 evo	2:49:30.1	+14:05.5	0	0	0
29	14	37	Olivier Burri	Anderson Levratti	Olivier Burri	Hyundai i20 N Rally2	2:50:29.1	+15:04.5	0	0	0
36	15	40	Eamonn Boland	Michael Joseph Morrissey	Eamonn Boland	Ford Fiesta Rally2	2:55:49.4	+20:24.8	0	0	0
51	16	43	Henk Vossen	Hans van Goor	Henk Vossen	Ford Fiesta R5	3:06:12.7	+30:48.1	0	0	0
58	17	41	Miguel Díaz-Aboitiz	Jordi Hereu	Miguel Díaz-Aboitiz	Škoda Fabia Rally2 evo	3:28:19.5	+52:54.9	0	0	0
62	18	39	Osamu Fukunaga	Misako Saida	Osamu Fukunaga	Škoda Fabia Rally2 evo	4:02:58.0	+1:27:33.4	0	0	0
Retired SS11		30	Pieter Jan Michiel Cracco	Jasper Vermeulen	Pieter Jan Michiel Cracco	Hyundai i20 N Rally2	Off-road		0	0	0
Retired SS9		23	Jari Huttunen	Mikko Lukka	M-Sport Ford WRT	Ford Fiesta Rally2	Engine		0	0	0
Retired SS6		32	Josh McErlean	James Fulton	Josh McErlean	Hyundai i20 N Rally2	Crash		0	0	0

==== Special stages ====
Stage	Open Championship				Junior Championship				Masters Cup			
Stage	Winners	Car	Time	Class leaders	Winners	Car	Time	Class leaders	Winners	Car	Time	Class leaders
SD	Bedoret / Gilbert	Škoda Fabia Rally2 evo	4:02.9	—N/a	Bedoret / Gilbert	Škoda Fabia Rally2 evo	4:02.9	—N/a	Kremer / Gottschalk	Škoda Fabia Rally2 evo	4:08.2	—N/a
SS1	Ingram / Drew	Škoda Fabia Rally2 evo	6:33.7	Ingram / Drew	Ingram / Drew	Škoda Fabia Rally2 evo	6:33.7	Ingram / Drew	Kremer / Gottschalk	Škoda Fabia Rally2 evo	6:40.3	Kremer / Gottschalk
SS2	Lefebvre / Malfoy	Citroën C3 Rally2	10:41.9	Lefebvre / Malfoy	Munster / Louka	Hyundai i20 N Rally2	10:47.5	Munster / Louka	Loix / Tsjoen	Škoda Fabia Rally2 evo	10:56.7	Loix / Tsjoen
SS3	Mikkelsen / Eriksen	Škoda Fabia Rally2 evo	4:38.0	Lefebvre / Malfoy	Munster / Louka	Hyundai i20 N Rally2	4:41.6	Munster / Louka	Kremer / Gottschalk	Škoda Fabia Rally2 evo	4:46.5	Loix / Tsjoen
SS4	Kremer / Gottschalk	Škoda Fabia Rally2 evo	4:57.4	Lefebvre / Malfoy	Munster / Louka	Hyundai i20 N Rally2	5:03.7	Munster / Louka	Kremer / Gottschalk	Škoda Fabia Rally2 evo	4:57.4	Kremer / Gottschalk
SS5	Lefebvre / Malfoy	Citroën C3 Rally2	6:32.7	Lefebvre / Malfoy	Ingram / Drew	Škoda Fabia Rally2 evo	6:37.4	Munster / Louka	Kremer / Gottschalk	Škoda Fabia Rally2 evo	6:39.4	Kremer / Gottschalk
SS6	Lefebvre / Malfoy	Citroën C3 Rally2	10:43.7	Lefebvre / Malfoy	Munster / Louka	Hyundai i20 N Rally2	10:46.7	Munster / Louka	Kremer / Gottschalk	Škoda Fabia Rally2 evo	11:05.3	Kremer / Gottschalk
SS7	Lefebvre / Malfoy	Citroën C3 Rally2	4:37.9	Lefebvre / Malfoy	Munster / Louka	Hyundai i20 N Rally2	4:41.5	Munster / Louka	Kremer / Gottschalk	Škoda Fabia Rally2 evo	4:53.9	Kremer / Gottschalk
SS8	Lefebvre / Malfoy	Citroën C3 Rally2	4:33.6	Lefebvre / Malfoy	Ingram / Drew	Škoda Fabia Rally2 evo	4:36.2	Munster / Louka	Loix / Tsjoen	Škoda Fabia Rally2 evo	4:39.8	Kremer / Gottschalk
SS9	Mikkelsen / Eriksen	Škoda Fabia Rally2 evo	8:21.0	Lefebvre / Malfoy	Ingram / Drew	Škoda Fabia Rally2 evo	8:21.8	Munster / Louka	Loix / Tsjoen	Škoda Fabia Rally2 evo	8:29.3	Kremer / Gottschalk
SS10	Mikkelsen / Eriksen	Škoda Fabia Rally2 evo	8:06.3	Lefebvre / Malfoy	Ingram / Drew	Škoda Fabia Rally2 evo	8:08.6	Munster / Louka	Loix / Tsjoen	Škoda Fabia Rally2 evo	8:18.4	Kremer / Gottschalk
SS11	Lefebvre / Malfoy	Citroën C3 Rally2	7:50.2	Lefebvre / Malfoy	Ingram / Drew	Škoda Fabia Rally2 evo	7:55.7	Munster / Louka	Loix / Tsjoen	Škoda Fabia Rally2 evo	8:08.3	Kremer / Gottschalk
SS12	Lefebvre / Malfoy	Citroën C3 Rally2	12:17.4	Lefebvre / Malfoy	Ingram / Drew	Škoda Fabia Rally2 evo	12:26.8	Munster / Louka	Loix / Tsjoen	Škoda Fabia Rally2 evo	12:30.9	Kremer / Gottschalk
SS13	Lefebvre / Malfoy	Citroën C3 Rally2	8:20.8	Lefebvre / Malfoy	Munster / Louka	Hyundai i20 N Rally2	8:29.0	Munster / Louka	Loix / Tsjoen	Škoda Fabia Rally2 evo	8:33.3	Kremer / Gottschalk
SS14	Mikkelsen / Eriksen	Škoda Fabia Rally2 evo	8:05.9	Lefebvre / Malfoy	Munster / Louka	Hyundai i20 N Rally2	8:11.7	Munster / Louka	Loix / Tsjoen	Škoda Fabia Rally2 evo	8:17.0	Kremer / Gottschalk
SS15	Lefebvre / Malfoy	Citroën C3 Rally2	7:45.9	Lefebvre / Malfoy	Munster / Louka	Hyundai i20 N Rally2	7:49.5	Munster / Louka	Loix / Tsjoen	Škoda Fabia Rally2 evo	8:02.9	Kremer / Gottschalk
SS16	Lefebvre / Malfoy	Citroën C3 Rally2	12:11.4	Lefebvre / Malfoy	Ingram / Drew	Škoda Fabia Rally2 evo	12:19.0	Munster / Louka	Loix / Tsjoen	Škoda Fabia Rally2 evo	12:22.1	Kremer / Gottschalk
SS17	Mikkelsen / Eriksen	Škoda Fabia Rally2 evo	6:46.0	Lefebvre / Malfoy	Ingram / Drew	Škoda Fabia Rally2 evo	6:46.9	Ingram / Drew	Loix / Tsjoen	Škoda Fabia Rally2 evo	6:51.3	Kremer / Gottschalk
SS18	Lefebvre / Malfoy	Citroën C3 Rally2	7:31.9	Lefebvre / Malfoy	Ingram / Drew	Škoda Fabia Rally2 evo	7:33.3	Ingram / Drew	Loix / Tsjoen	Škoda Fabia Rally2 evo	7:35.2	Kremer / Gottschalk
SS19	Lefebvre / Malfoy	Citroën C3 Rally2	6:46.1	Lefebvre / Malfoy	Ingram / Drew	Škoda Fabia Rally2 evo	6:46.3	Ingram / Drew	Loix / Tsjoen	Škoda Fabia Rally2 evo	6:52.7	Kremer / Gottschalk
SS20	Mikkelsen / Eriksen	Škoda Fabia Rally2 evo	7:28.7	Lefebvre / Malfoy	Munster / Louka	Hyundai i20 N Rally2	7:34.0	Ingram / Drew	Loix / Tsjoen	Škoda Fabia Rally2 evo	7:36.9	Kremer / Gottschalk

==== Championship standings ====
Pos.	Open Drivers' championships			Open Co-drivers' championships			Teams' championships			Junior Drivers' championships			Junior Co-drivers' championships			Driver Masters' championships			Co-driver Masters' championships		
Pos.	Move	Driver	Points	Move	Co-driver	Points	Move	Manufacturer	Points	Move	Manufacturer	Points	Move	Driver	Points	Move	Driver	Points	Move	Driver	Points
1		Andreas Mikkelsen	100		Torstein Eriksen	100	1	Toksport WRT	155	1	Chris Ingram	92		James Fulton	111		Mauro Miele	86		Laurent Magat	75
2	2	Yohan Rossel	80		Maciej Szczepaniak	76	1	Hyundai Motorsport N	116	1	Emil Lindholm	83	1	Louis Louka	61		Freddy Loix	83		Michael Joseph Morrissey	61
3	1	Kajetan Kajetanowicz	76	1	Valentin Sarreaud	69		Toksport WRT 2	58		Nikolay Gryazin	61	1	Samu Vaaleri	50		Jean-Michel Raoux	52	2	Hans van Goor	43
4	1	Emil Lindholm	64	1	Reeta Hämäläinen	64		Yaco ACCR Team	50		Mikołaj Marczyk	59		Elia De Guio	25	1	Armin Kremer	50	1	Michela Lorigiola	30
5	2	Chris Ingram	56	2	Craig Drew	56		Saintéloc Junior Team	40		Eerik Pietarinen	58				1	Olivier Burri	48	1	Jörgen Fornander	25

=== WRC-3 Rally3 ===
==== Classification ====
Position		No.	Driver	Co-driver	Entrant	Car	Time	Difference	Points
Event	Class	No.	Driver	Co-driver	Entrant	Car	Time	Difference	Open
34	1	45	Jan Černý	Tom Woodburn	Jan Černý	Ford Fiesta Rally3	2:43:14.2	0.0	25
51	2	47	Zoltán László	Tamás Kürti	Zoltán László	Ford Fiesta Rally3	3:03:56.2	+10:41.8	18
69	3	46	Enrico Brazzoli	Manuel Fenoli	Enrico Brazzoli	Ford Fiesta Rally3	4:46:01.1	+1:52:46.9	15

==== Special stages ====
Stage	Open Championship			
Stage	Winners	Car	Time	Class leaders
SD	Černý / Woodburn	Ford Fiesta Rally3	4:26.6	—N/a
SS1	Černý / Woodburn	Ford Fiesta Rally3	7:17.6	Černý / Woodburn
SS2	Černý / Woodburn	Ford Fiesta Rally3	11:53.7	Černý / Woodburn
SS3	Černý / Woodburn	Ford Fiesta Rally3	5:16.0	Černý / Woodburn
SS4	Černý / Woodburn	Ford Fiesta Rally3	5:17.3	Černý / Woodburn
SS5	Černý / Woodburn	Ford Fiesta Rally3	7:15.7	Černý / Woodburn
SS6	Černý / Woodburn	Ford Fiesta Rally3	11:50.5	Černý / Woodburn
SS7	Černý / Woodburn	Ford Fiesta Rally3	5:09.4	Černý / Woodburn
SS8	Černý / Woodburn	Ford Fiesta Rally3	5:07.7	Černý / Woodburn
SS9	Černý / Woodburn	Ford Fiesta Rally3	9:19.6	Černý / Woodburn
SS10	Černý / Woodburn	Ford Fiesta Rally3	9:08.9	Černý / Woodburn
SS11	Černý / Woodburn	Ford Fiesta Rally3	8:49.7	Černý / Woodburn
SS12	Stage interrupted			
SS13	Černý / Woodburn	Ford Fiesta Rally3	9:22.0	Černý / Woodburn
SS14	Černý / Woodburn	Ford Fiesta Rally3	9:20.9	Černý / Woodburn
SS15	Černý / Woodburn	Ford Fiesta Rally3	8:52.4	Černý / Woodburn
SS16	Černý / Woodburn	Ford Fiesta Rally3	13:57.7	Černý / Woodburn
SS17	Černý / Woodburn	Ford Fiesta Rally3	7:42.0	Černý / Woodburn
SS18	Černý / Woodburn	Ford Fiesta Rally3	8:21.4	Černý / Woodburn
SS19	Černý / Woodburn	Ford Fiesta Rally3	7:42.9	Černý / Woodburn
SS20	Černý / Woodburn	Ford Fiesta Rally3	8:12.1	Černý / Woodburn

==== Championship standings ====
Pos.	Open Drivers' championships			Open Co-drivers' championships		
Pos.	Move	Driver	Points	Move	Co-driver	Points
1		Sami Pajari	87		Enni Mälkönen	87
2	1	Jan Černý	86		Mikael Korhonen	61
3	1	Lauri Joona	86	1	Tamás Kürti	61
4	2	Zoltán László	61	2	Manuel Fenoli	48
5	1	McRae Kimathi	57	2	Liam Regan	45

== Notes ==
Previous rally: 2022 Rally Finland	2022 FIA World Rally Championship	Next rally: 2022 Acropolis Rally
Previous rally: 2021 Ypres Rally	2022 Ypres Rally	Next rally: 2023 Ypres Rally
