= Ken Block =

American rally driver (1967–2023)

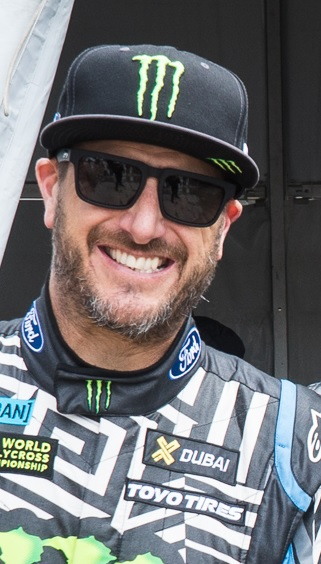
- Block in 2016
- Born: Kenneth Paul Block; November 21, 1967 Long Beach, California, U.S.
- Died: January 2, 2023 (aged 55) Wasatch County, Utah, U.S.
- Relatives: Lucy Block (wife); Lia Block (daughter); Kira Block (daughter); Mika Block (son)

FIA World Rallycross Championship career
- Debut season: 2014
- Car number: 43
- Former teams: Hoonigan Racing Division
- Starts: 26
- Wins: 0
- Podiums: 2
- Best finish: 9th in 2017

FIA ERX Supercar Championship
- Years active: 2014
- Car number: 43
- Former teams: Hoonigan Racing Division
- Starts: 1
- Wins: 1
- Podiums: 1
- Best finish: 15th in 2014

Global RallyCross Championship
- Years active: 2011–2015
- Car number: 43
- Former teams: Hoonigan Racing Division; Monster World Rally Team
- Starts: 39
- Wins: 6
- Podiums: 12
- Best finish: 2nd in 2014

Rally America
- Years active: 2005 2010, 2012–2015
- Car number: 43
- Co-driver: (Italy) Alex Gelsomino
- Former teams: Hoonigan Racing Division; Monster World Rally Team
- Starts: 60
- Wins: 16
- Podiums: 28
- Best finish: 2nd Overall in 2006, 2008, and 2013.

American Rally Association
- Years active: 2018-2022
- Car number: 43
- Co-driver: (Italy) Alex Gelsomino
- Former teams: Hoonigan Racing Division
- Starts: 19
- Wins: 5
- Podiums: 13
- Best finish: 2nd Overall in 2021 and 2022.

World Rally Championship record
- Years active: 2007–2008, 2010–2014, 2018
- Co-driver: (Italy) Alex Gelsomino
- Teams: M-Sport World Rally Team; Hoonigan Racing Division; Monster World Rally Team; Subaru Rally Team USA
- Rallies: 24
- Championships: 0
- Rally wins: 0
- Podiums: 0
- Stage wins: 0
- Total points: 18
- First rally: 2007 Rally México
- Last rally: 2018 Rally Catalunya

Kenneth Paul Block (November 21, 1967 – January 2, 2023) was an American professional rally driver, extreme sports racer, and business entrepreneur with the Hoonigan Racing Division, formerly known as the Monster World Rally Team. Block was also one of the co-founders of DC Shoes. He also competed in many action sports events, including skateboarding, snowboarding, and motocross.

After selling his ownership of DC Shoes, Block shifted his business focus to Hoonigan Industries, an apparel brand marketing to auto enthusiasts. He was the co-owner and "Head Hoonigan In Charge" (HHIC) at the company before his death in a snowmobile accident in January 2023.

His daughters, Lia Block, Kira Block, and his son Mika Block are all also racing drivers.

== Early life ==
Kenneth Paul Block (known by his initials as "KB") was born and raised in Southern California, later San Diego, on November 21, 1967.

== Rallying ==
=== 2005 ===
In 2005, Block began his National rallying career with the Vermont SportsCar team. Vermont SportsCar prepared a 2005 Subaru WRX STi for Block to compete. His first event of the rallying season was Sno*Drift, where he ended up finishing seventh overall and fifth in the Group N class. During the 2005 season, Block had five top five finishes and placed third overall in the Group A class and fourth overall in the Rally America National Championship. At the end of his first rallying year, Block had won the Rally America Rookie of the Year award.

=== 2006 ===
In 2006, Block, along with his DC rally teammate Travis Pastrana, signed a new sponsorship deal with Subaru. Through this deal with Subaru, the teammates became known as "Subaru Rally Team USA". With the new rally season, Block also got a brand-new Vermont SportsCar prepped 2006 Subaru WRX STi. He competed in the first-ever X Games rally event at X Games XII. In the competition, Block ended up finishing third to take the bronze. He went on to compete in the 2006 Rally America National Championship, where he finished second overall.

=== 2007 ===
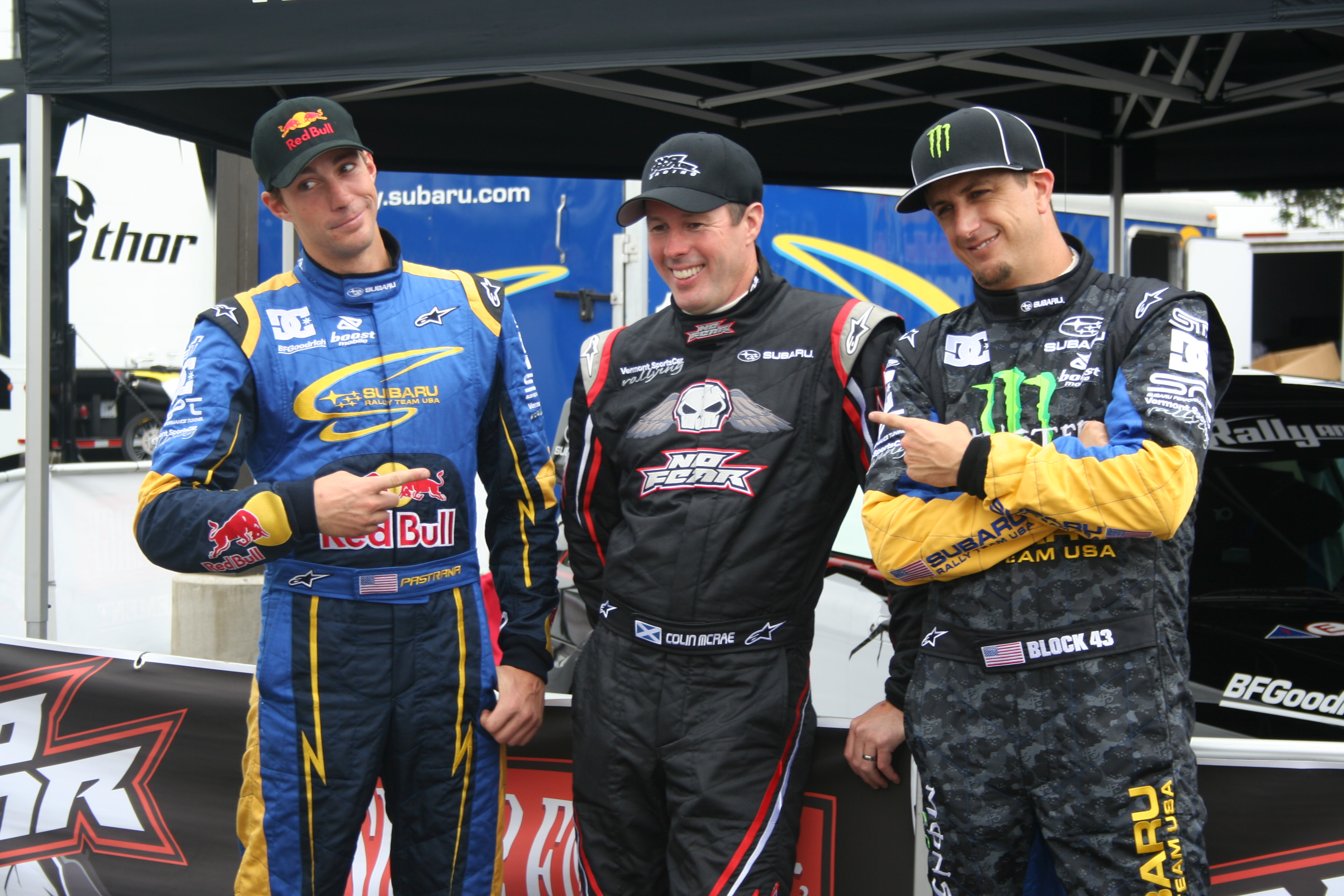
Travis Pastrana and Colin McRae with Ken Block in 2007

In 2007, Block competed in the X Games XIII rally event, where he placed second overall and won a silver medal. In the 2007 Rally America National Championship, Block finished third overall. During this season, Block also entered in a few rounds of the World Rally Championship; Rally Mexico and Rally New Zealand. In Rally New Zealand, Block recorded two top-five stage times in the Group N class. At the end of 2007, Block had achieved 19 podiums and eight overall victories in rally events.

=== 2008 ===
In 2008, Block was provided with a brand-new rally-prepped 2008 Subaru WRX STi to compete. Block competed in the Rallye Baie-des Chaleurs of the Canadian Rally Championship to gain some experience with his new 2008 rally car and prepare for the World Rally Championships later in the year. He gained his first Canadian rally win at the event. This was only the second event for the new car. Block and his co-driver were unable to get any championship points at the event due to not having a Canadian competition license. Block competed in the Rally New York USA competition and finished in first place. In the X Games XIV rally competition, Block finished tied for third place with Dave Mirra. This occurrence was due to both competitors having issues with their car. Block, who made it to the semi-finals of the event, had a radiator problem after landing the car awkwardly on a jump. With both bronze place competitors in damaged cars unable to compete, the medals were awarded to both of them.

Block competed in the 2008 Rally America National championship, which concluded on October 17, 2008. In the event, he finished second overall with a strong victory in the last event. In the Lake Superior Performance Rally (LSPR) stage, Block finished over one minute ahead of his next closest competitor and secured the second overall position. Next up for Block this rally season is three World Rally Championship events.

=== 2009 ===
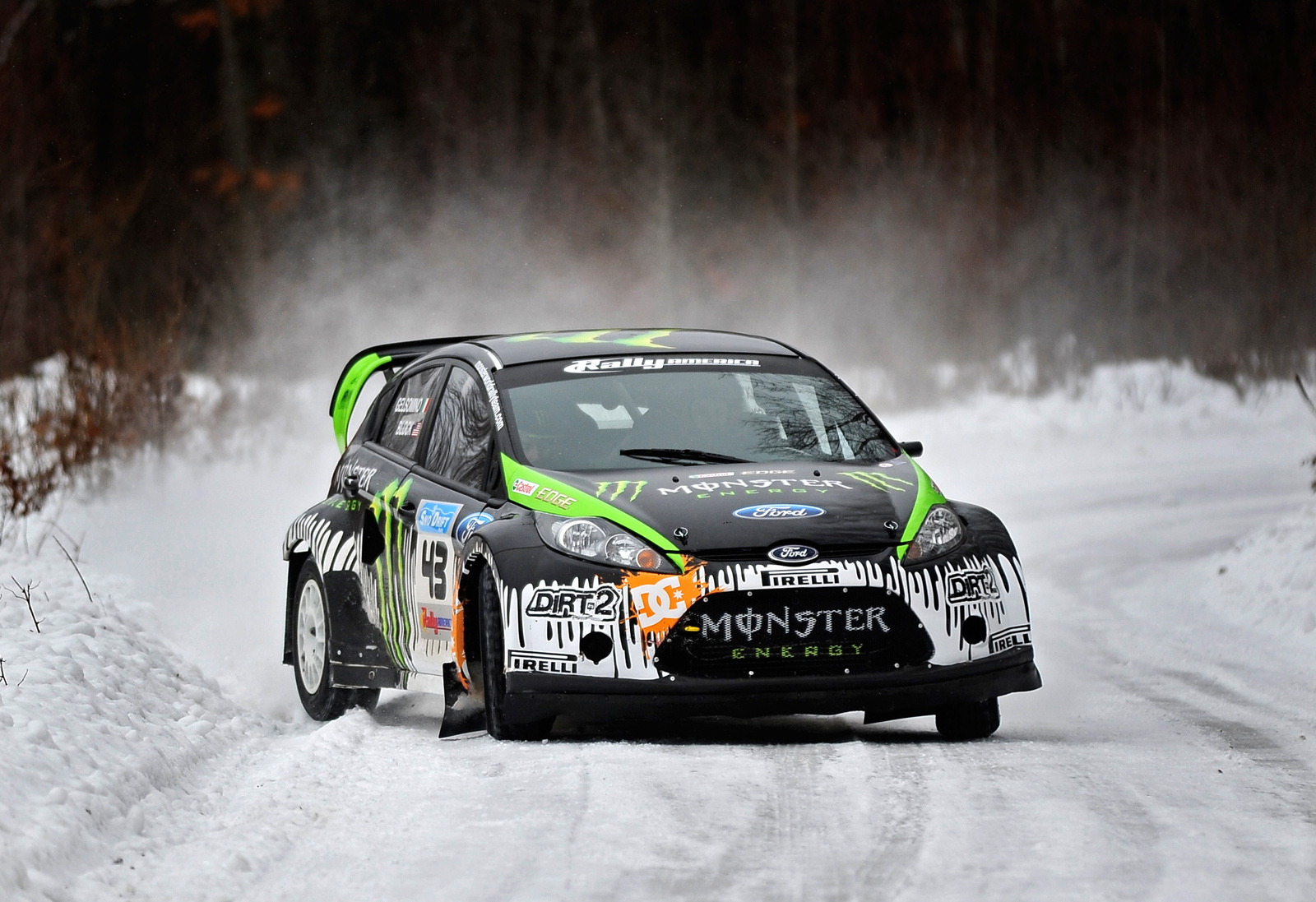
Block testing Ford Fiesta for the 2010 Rally America season

Block appeared in a segment of motoring show Top Gear. Block filmed the YouTube video "Gymkhana 2".

=== 2010 ===
For 2010, Block ended his partnership with Subaru, and joined Ford to compete part-time at the World Rally Championship for Monster World Rally Team, where he drove a Ford Focus RS WRC 08 together with long time co-driver Alex Gelsomino. Block therefore became the first ever American driver to campaign for the World Rally Championship. He scored two points after finishing ninth in Spain. Also, he ran his sixth season of the Rally America Championship in an open class Ford Fiesta, as well as his fifth X Games. On February 27, Block won the Rally in the 100 Acre Wood (Rally America) for the fifth consecutive time. This broke the record held by John Buffum.

=== 2011 ===
On March 23, Block and his co-driver Alex Gelsomino were taken to hospital, having rolled their Ford Fiesta RS WRC during the shakedown stage of the 2011 Rally de Portugal in Faro, Portugal A representative of the Monster World Rally team later stated that both men were fine. He finished eighth at the France and ninth at Wales, scoring six points.

=== 2013 ===
On his first race of 2013 season, Block scored well, entering top-ten in the Mexican rally, thus receiving his first six points for the championship and scored a best-ever seventh overall finish.

=== 2014 ===
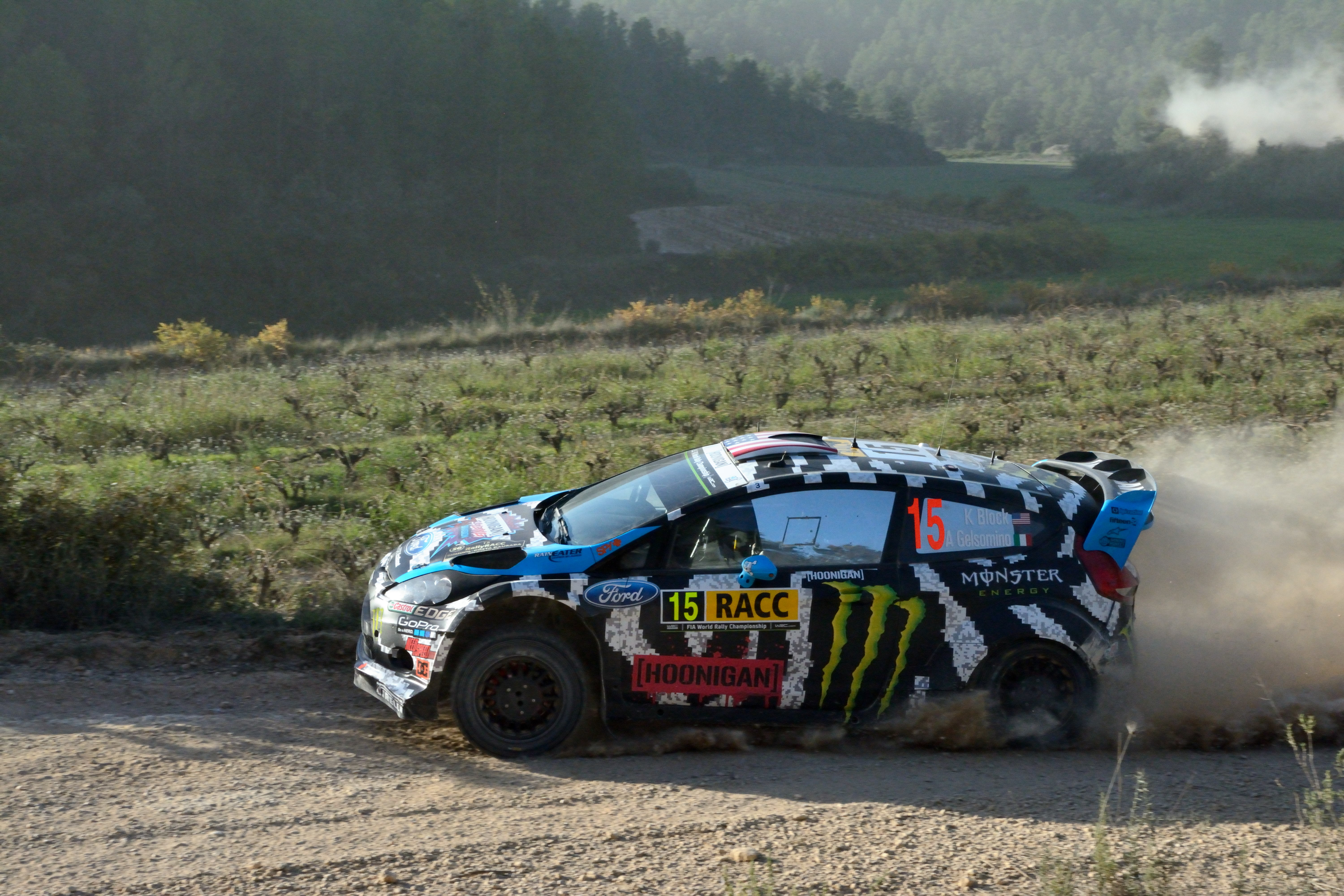
Participation in 2014 Rally Catalunya.

Castrol returned as Block's sponsor. He participated in the WRC located in Catalunya, Spain. He was in tenth place until the last stage where he suffered a tire puncture and lost a significant amount of time. He finished in 12th, which was his second to last season at the WRC.

== Rallycross ==
=== X Games ===
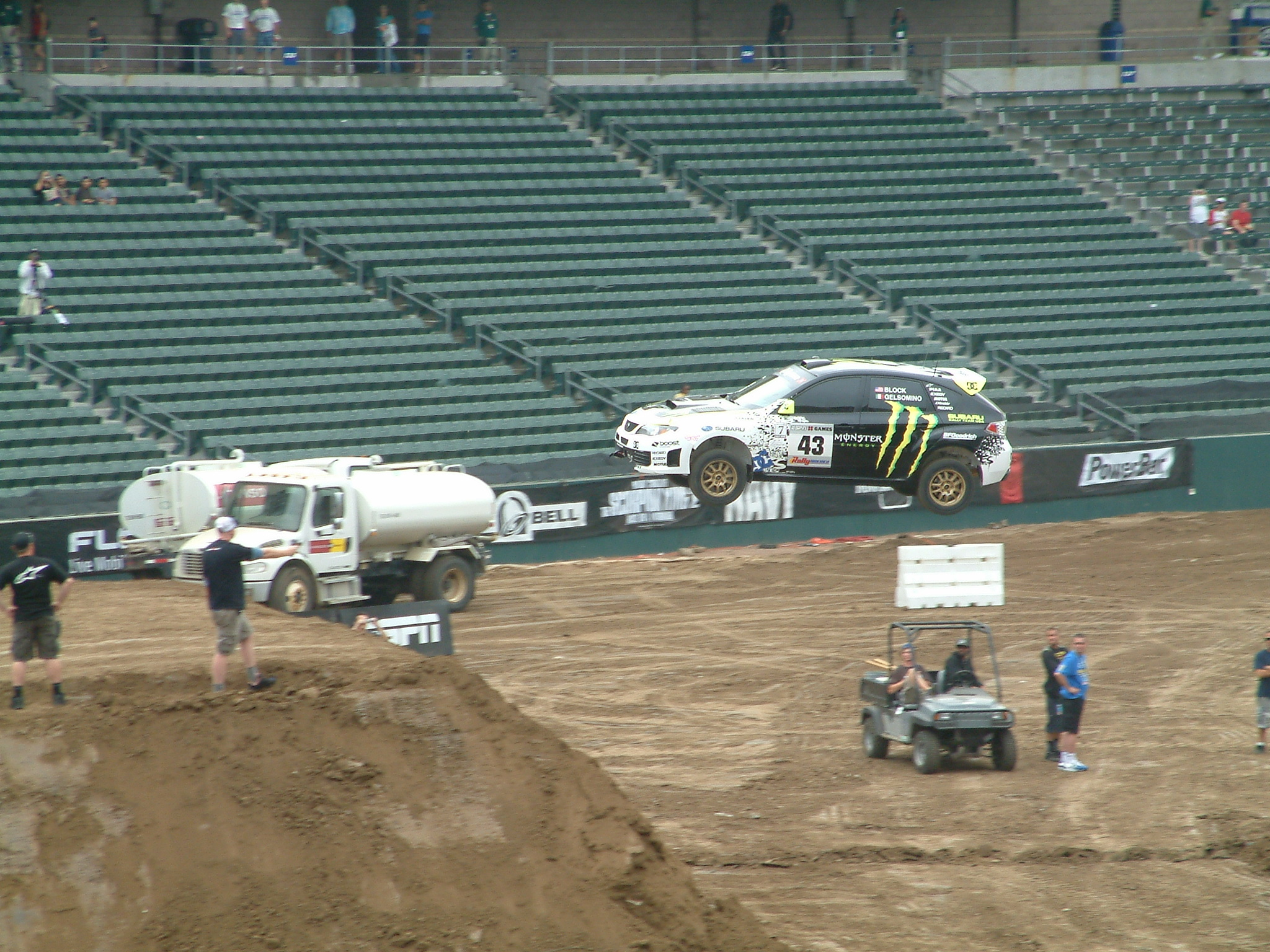
Block at the 2008 X Games

Block's X Games results are as follows:

- 2006: 3rd, Bronze
- 2007: 2nd, Silver
- 2008: 3rd, Bronze
- 2009: 7th
- 2010:
  - Rally Racing: 10th
  - RallyCross: 7th
- 2011:
  - Rally Racing: 11th
  - RallyCross: 13th
- 2012: 2nd, Silver
- 2013:
  - Foz do Iguaçu: 8th
  - Munich: 2nd, Silver
  - Los Angeles: 6th
- 2014: 12th
- 2015: 11th

=== American rallycross ===
Block competed at the Global RallyCross Championship from 2011 to 2015. He finished runner-up in 2014 and third in 2013 and fifth in 2012, collecting six wins and 15 podiums.

Block returned full-time for the 2018 Americas Rallycross Championship, where he claimed two podiums and ranked fourth in points.

=== European rallycross ===
In 2014, Block was third in the Norway round of the FIA World Rallycross Championship and won the Norway round of the European Rallycross Championship.

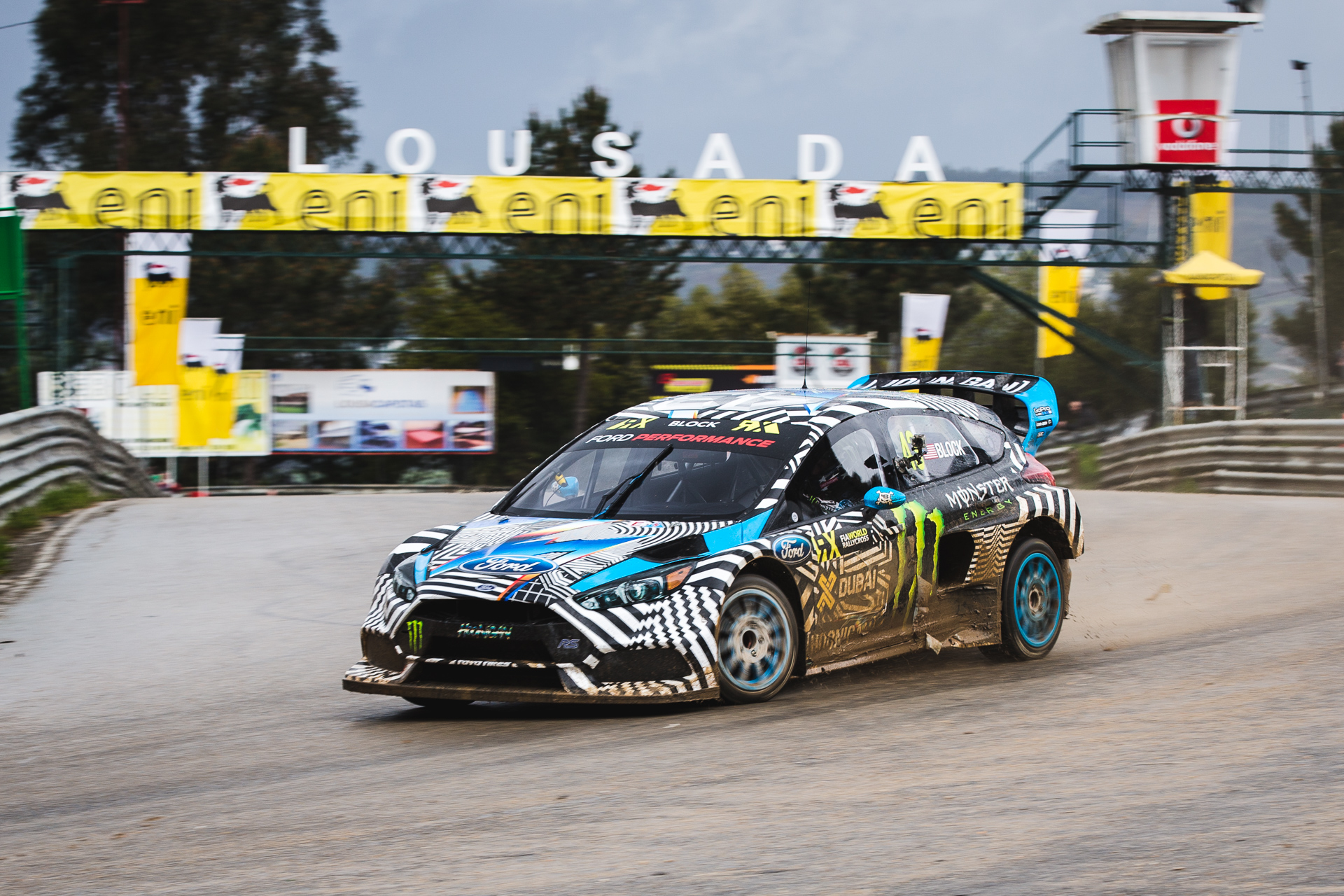
Block at the 2016 World RX of Portugal in his Ford Focus RS RX.

For the 2016 season, Block decided to compete full-time in the World Rallycross Championship.

At Hockenheimring, Germany, Block finished third in the Super car Final and achieved his second podium in the series.

In 2017, Block finished ninth in points, with a best finish of seventh at Britain and France.

== Gymkhana ==
Block produced a series of gymkhana videos which have drawn millions of views on YouTube.

In 2009, for the BBC show Top Gear, Block took James May out for Gymkhana-style driving at Block's stunt course at Inyokern Airport, an operational California airport, also starring Ricky Carmichael. In 2010, Block took the feature car from the previous episode (a Reliant Robin) for a lap of the Top Gear test track. He rolled the car and was unable to complete a lap but was unhurt.

On August 24, 2010, Block released the first of a three-part Gymkhana 3 video release featuring his new Ford Fiesta.

On September 14, 2010, Block's third Gymkhana video, featuring a Ford Fiesta, was released on YouTube.

On August 16, 2011, the fourth Gymkhana video, The Hollywood Megamercial was released on YouTube, featuring Block driving around the Universal Studios backlot.

On July 9, 2012, Block released his fifth Gymkhana video on YouTube, featuring Block driving his Ford Fiesta in San Francisco and Travis Pastrana on a dirtbike. After 24 hours, the video was viewed 5.1 million times, making it the top-viewed video of the previous week.

In 2024, Hoonigan released a video compilation containing all of Block's Gymkhana videos and Gymkhana spinoff videos, apart from the two he did with Top Gear and the BBC.

Main video series

- Ken Block Gymkhana Practice (2008; Subaru Impreza)
- Ken Block Gymkhana Two the Infomercial (2009; Subaru Impreza)
- Ken Block's Gymkhana Three, Part 2; Ultimate Playground; l'Autodrome, France (2010; Ford Fiesta)
- Ken Block's Gymkhana Four; The Hollywood Megamercial (2011; Ford Fiesta)
- Ken Block's Gymkhana Five: Ultimate Urban Playground; San Francisco (2012; Ford Fiesta)
- Ken Block's Gymkhana Six – Ultimate Gymkhana Grid Course (2013; Ford Fiesta)
- Ken Block's Gymkhana Seven: Wild in the Streets of Los Angeles (2014; Ford Mustang)
- Ken Block's Gymkhana Eight: Ultimate Exotic Playground in Dubai (2016; Ford Fiesta)
- Ken Block's Gymkhana Nine: Raw Industrial Playground (2016; Ford Focus)
- Ken Block's Gymkhana Ten: The Ultimate Tire Slaying Tour (2018; Ford Fiesta, Escort RS Cosworth, Focus, Mustang and F-150)

Other videos

- Ken Block Airfield Rallying (2009; Subaru Impreza)
- Castrol Footkhana: Neymar Jr vs Ken Block (2014; Ford Fiesta)
- Ken Block Drifts London (2016; Ford Mustang)
- Ken Block's Terrakhana: The Ultimate Dirt Playground; Swing Arm City Utah (2017; Ford Fiesta)
- Ken Block's Climbkhana: Pikes Peak Featuring the Hoonicorn V2 (2017; Ford Mustang)
- Ken Block's Climbkhana Two: 914hp Hoonitruck on China's Most Dangerous Road; Tianmen Mountain (2019; Ford F-150)
- Ken Block's Electrikhana: High Stakes Playground; Las Vegas, in the Audi S1 Hoonitron (2022; Audi S1 Hoonitron)
- Ken Block’s Electrikhana Two: One More Playground; Mexico City in the Audi S1 Hoonitron (2023; Audi S1 Hoonitron)

=== Locations ===
Gymkhana
| No. | Car | Location |
|---|---|---|
| 1 | Subaru Impreza WRX STI | Marine Corps Air Station El Toro |
| 2 | Subaru Impreza WRX STI | Port of Los Angeles |
| 3 | Ford Fiesta GYM3 | Autodrome de Montlhéry |
| 4 | Ford Fiesta H.F.H.V | Universal Studios Lot |
| 5 | Ford Fiesta H.F.H.V | San Francisco |
| 6 | Ford Fiesta ST RX43 | San Bernardino International Airport |
| 7 | Ford Mustang RTR "Hoonicorn" | Downtown Los Angeles |
| 8 | Ford Fiesta ST RX43 | Dubai |
| 9 | Ford Focus RS RX | Western New York |
| 10 | Ford Fiesta WRC (Note: There were two Ford Fiesta WRCs used in this scene (one for Ken Block and one for Oliver Solberg)) | Luleå |
| 10 | Ford Mustang RTR "Hoonicorn V2" | Detroit |
| 10 | Ford Focus RS RX | Guanajuato |
| 10 | Ford Escort RS Cosworth "The Cossie" | Los Angeles |
| 10 | Ford F-150 "Hoonitruck" | Shamrock, Texas |
Travis Pastrana Takeover
| 11 | Subaru WRX STI "Air Slayer" | Annapolis |
| 12 | Subaru Leone GL Wagon "Family Huckster" | South Florida |
| 13 | Subaru BRAT 9500 Turbo "Brataroo" | Australia |
Other Videos
| | Subaru Impreza WRX STI | Inyokern Airport |
| | Ford Fiesta ST RX43 | Barcelona |
| | Ford Mustang RTR "Hoonicorn" | London |
| | Ford Fiesta ST RX43 | Caineville, Utah |
| | Ford Mustang RTR "Hoonicorn V2" | Pikes Peak |
| | Ford F-150 "Hoonitruck" | Tianmen Mountain |
| | Audi S1 Hoonitron | Las Vegas |
| | Audi S1 Hoonitron | Mexico City |

== Other motorsport activities ==
In 2005, Block, along with his DC Shoes associates, participated in the Gumball 3000 Rally. For the event, they sent out three modified 2004 Subaru WRX STis sponsored by DC Shoes.

In 2006, Block competed in the One Lap of America competition along with Brian Scotto. They were teamed up in a 2006 Subaru WRX STi and finished forty-fifth overall.

In 2006, for the Discovery Channel show Stunt Junkies, Block jumped his Subaru WRX STi rally car 171 feet (52 m) and a max height of 25 feet (7.6 m).

In 2007, Block joined the DC Shoes Snowboarding team at New Zealand's Snow Park. Block did massive jumps and assisted in snowboarding tricks while driving his rally car on the mountain alongside the snowboarders. A crash after landing a large jump cracked one of the vertebrae in his spine; he was flown to the hospital. The session made the cover of the December 2007 issue of Snowboarder Magazine and closed out the MTN.LAB 1.5 DVD.

In 2010, Block co-founded Gymkhana Grid, a gymkhana race held annually around the world. He won all-wheel-drive event in 2014, beating Jake Archer in the final duel.

In 2019, Block travelled to Ireland to Compete in the Donegal International Rally. He drove an Escort Cosworth for the event. He crashed out on SS2.

In 2021, Block raced in the Baja 1000 in the trophy truck class finishing in 4th.

Block also holds the world record for the world's fastest snowcat, a modified Ford Raptor called the RaptorTrax.

== Video games ==
Block appeared in three installments of Codemasters' Dirt racing video games. Block is featured as a driver in 2009's Colin McRae: Dirt 2, along with his Subaru Rally Team USA Impreza. In 2011's Dirt 3 he is seen as a driver and gymkhana teacher, his Monster World Rally Team vehicles are available in the game, including the Ford Fiesta GYM 3, and the Ken Block Ford Focus WRC. His Hoonigan/Monster Ford Fiesta appears extensively in 2012's Dirt: Showdown, and his trademark gymkhana style of driving is featured at the Head-to-Head and Trick Rush race modes as well as the Freestyle section.

Block appears in the 2015 Need for Speed video game as the style icon.

Block's Hoonigan-branded cars have also featured in Microsoft's Forza racing video game series. Their first appearance was in expansion packs for Forza Horizon 3 and Forza Motorsport 7 in 2017. Later they were offered as launch cars for 2018's Forza Horizon 4 and 2021's Forza Horizon 5.

In 2021, Block started a collaboration with drag racing game CSR Racing 2, a mobile game for iOS and Android.

In 2023, a racing styled car with the name "Hoon" and number 43 was added to version 2 of CD Projekt Red's Cyberpunk 2077, as he died before major patch 2.0.

In November 2023, CSR Racing 2 released an update which added a #KB43VER event featuring a playable 1965 Ford Mustang GT Hoonicorn V1 vehicle.

On November 20, 2025, Real Racing 3 released update v13.7, which added Ken Block's Audi S1 E-Tron Quattro Hoonitron to the game, and it can be used in two series. The car comes in the official gray and red "Hoonitron" livery, as driven by Block.

== Signature wheels ==
In 2021, Block collaborated with Rotiform and Fuel Off-Road through Wheel Pros to make 4 sets of signature wheels.

=== Rotiform KB-1 ===
- His 1965 Ford Mustang (aka Hoonicorn) uses the Rotiform KB-1 in a 5x120 PCD, with a 26 offset in a 18x10.5 tire width. It is a forged 3pc type wheel in gloss white.
- His 1986 Ford RS200 uses the same wheels in a 54 offset, with a 18x9.5 tire width in a 4x108 PCD. It is a forged mono2 style wheel in gloss white.
- His 2016 Ford Focus RS uses the same wheels in a 42 offset, with a 19x18.5 tire width in a 5x108 PCD. It is a forged mono2 style wheel in gloss white.

=== Fuel Off-Road, the Block ===
- His 1977 Ford F-150 (aka Hoonitruck) uses the Fuel Block in a 5x120 PCD, with a -48 offset in a 20x10.5 tire width. It is forged beadlock type wheel in gloss white.
- His 2017 SVC Offroad Ford F-150 Raptor uses the Fuel Block in a 6x135 PCD, with a 0 offset in a 17x9 tire width. It is forged beadlock type wheel in a matte black with a gloss black ring.
- His 2017 Ford F-150 Raptor uses the Fuel Block in a 6x135 PCD, with a 0 offset in a 17x9 tire width. It is forged beadlock type wheel in a matte black with a gloss black ring.

=== Rotiform VCE-M ===
- His 1994 Ford Escort RS Cosworth WRC AKA Cossie V2 uses the Rotiform VCE-M in a 4x108 PCD, with a 31 offset in a 18x8.5 tire width. It is a forged 3pc in gloss white.
- His 2015 Ford Fiesta ST RX43 uses the Rotiform VCE-M in a 5x135 PCD, with a 54 offset in a 18x8.5 tire width. It is a forged Monoblock style wheel in gloss white.

=== Rotiform GTB ===
Block's 1978 Ford Escort Mk2 RS uses the Rotiform GTB in a 4x108 PCD, with a 13 offset in a 17x9 tire width. It is a forged Monoblock style wheel in gloss white.

== Other appearances on TV/YouTube ==
Block made a minor appearance on the MotorTrend show Ignition with Jonny Lieberman. The purpose of his appearance was to promote the 2017 Ford Raptor. Block also appeared four times on the BBC motoring show Top Gear, being interviewed by presenter James May in 2009, before making a brief appearance in 2010 crashing a Reliant Robin, returning in 2016 where he drifted his Hoonicorn around the empty streets of London with Matt LeBlanc, and portraying a police officer chasing LeBlanc, Chris Harris and Rory Reid in 2018. He also appeared in a Daily Driven Exotics vlog as Damon Fryer was invited to race against Lia Block in "Hoonicorn vs the World", a YouTube series on the Hoonigan YouTube channel.

In 2017, Block appeared briefly in the documentary Dumb: The Story of Big Brother Magazine.

== Personal life and death ==
Block was married to wife Lucy Block. His eldest daughter Lia began competing in the American Rally Association in 2022, winning the O2WD Driver's Championship the following year at age 16, before the end of season series, enabling her to enter the final race with her father's legendary Ford Escort RS Cosworth. Earlier in 2023, she would enter the Extreme E series for Carl Cox Motorsport. She became a member of the Williams Driver Academy in November 2023 and was announced to compete in F1 Academy for the 2024 season with ART Grand Prix.

On January 2, 2023, Block died at age 55 in a snowmobile accident near his ranch in Woodland, Utah. The Wasatch County sheriff's department reported that Block had been riding in the Mill Hollow area when his snowmobile upended on a steep slope and landed on top of him. Block was declared dead at the scene of the accident. Hoonigan confirmed Block's death. As a mark of respect, the number 43 was permanently retired from the World Rally Championship and the American Rally Association in his honor.

== Racing record ==
=== Complete ARA results ===
(key)

| Year | Car | 1 | 2 | 3 | 4 | 5 | 6 | 7 | 8 | Rank | Points |
|---|---|---|---|---|---|---|---|---|---|---|---|
| 2018 | Ford Escort RS Cosworth | OTR; 3 | NEFR; Ret | | | | | | | 9th | 15 |
| 2019 | Ford Escort RS Cosworth | 100AW; Ret | | | | | | | | - | - |
| 2020 | Ford Escort RS Cosworth | SOFR; 2 | | | | | | | | 9th | 17 |
| 2021 | Skoda Fabia R5 Subaru WRX STI | 100AW; 2 | OLY; 2 | SOFR; 18 | NEFR; Ret | OFR; 2 | LSPR; 1 | OTR; 3 | | 2nd | 89 |
| 2022 | Hyundai i20 Coupe WRC | 100AW; 2 | OLY; Ret | OTR; 1 | SOFR; 1 | NEFR; 2 | OFR; 1 | STPR; 1 | LSPR; Ret | 2nd | 139 |

=== Complete Rally America results ===
(key)

| Year | Car | 1 | 2 | 3 | 4 | 5 | 6 | 7 | 8 | 9 | Rank | Points |
|---|---|---|---|---|---|---|---|---|---|---|---|---|
| 2005 | Subaru Impreza WRX STi | SNO; 5 | OTR; 7 | STPR; 3 | PIK; 4 | MAI; 3 | OFR; Ret | COL; 4 | LSPR; 3 | | 4th | 65 |
| 2006 | Subaru Impreza WRX STi | SNO; 3 | 100AW; 1 | OTR; 3 | STPR; Ret | MAI; 11 | OFR; Ret | COL; Ret | LSPR; 1 | WIL; 3 | 2nd | 90 |
| 2007 | Subaru Impreza WRX STi | SNO; 6 | 100AW; 1 | OTR; 2 | OLY; 4 | STPR; Ret | NEFR; 3 | OFR; 2 | COL; 1 | LSPR; Ret | 3rd | 109 |
| 2008 | Subaru Impreza WRX STi | SNO; 5 | 100AW; 1 | OLY; 1 | OTR; Ret | STPR; Ret | NEFR; Ret | OFR; Ret | COL; 5 | LSPR; 1 | 2nd | 86 |
| 2009 | Subaru Impreza WRX STi | SNO; Ret | 100AW; 1 | OLY; Ret | OTR; Ret | STPR; 1 | NEFR; 2 | OFR; Ret | COL; Ret | LSPR; 3 | 4th | 80 |
| 2010 | Ford Fiesta | SNO; Ret | 100AW; 1 | OLY; Ret | OTR; Ret | STPR; Ret | NEFR; Ret | | | | 13th | 27 |
| 2012 | Ford Fiesta ST | SNO | 100AW; 1 | OTR | STPR | NEFR | OLY; 1 | | | | 4th | 44 |
| 2013 | Ford Fiesta ST | SNO; 6 | 100AW; Ret | OTR; 2 | STPR; 1 | NEFR; 1 | OFR; 1 | LSPR; Ret | | | 2nd | 93 |
| 2014 | Ford Fiesta ST | SNO | 100AW; 1 | OTR | STPR | MTW | NEFR | OFR | LSPR | | 12th | 22 |
| 2015 | Ford Fiesta ST | SNO | 100AW | OTR | OLY | STP | NEFR; 2 | OFR | LSPR | | 14th | 17 |

=== Complete WRC results ===
(key)

| Year | Entrant | Car | 1 | 2 | 3 | 4 | 5 | 6 | 7 | 8 | 9 | 10 | 11 | 12 | 13 | 14 | 15 | 16 | Rank | Points |
|---|---|---|---|---|---|---|---|---|---|---|---|---|---|---|---|---|---|---|---|---|
| 2007 | Ken Block | Subaru Impreza WRX STI | MON | SWE | NOR | MEX; 28 | POR | ARG | ITA | GRE | FIN | GER | | | | | | | NC | 0 |
| 2007 | Rally FaNZ | Subaru Impreza WRX STI | | | | | | | | | | | NZL; 56 | ESP | FRA | JPN | IRE | GBR | NC | 0 |
| 2008 | Subaru Rally Team USA | Subaru Impreza WRX STI | MON | SWE | MEX | ARG | JOR | ITA | GRE | TUR | FIN | GER | NZL; 30 | ESP | FRA | JPN | GBR | | NC | 0 |
| 2010 | Monster World Rally Team | Ford Focus RS WRC 08 | SWE | MEX; 18 | JOR | TUR; 24 | NZL | POR; Ret | BUL | FIN | GER; Ret | JPN | FRA; 12 | ESP; 9 | GBR; 21 | | | | 19th | 2 |
| 2011 | Monster World Rally Team | Ford Fiesta RS WRC | SWE; 14 | MEX; 12 | POR; DNS | JOR | ITA | ARG; 18 | GRE | FIN | GER; 17 | AUS; 19 | FRA; 8 | ESP; Ret | GBR; 9 | | | | 22nd | 6 |
| 2012 | Monster World Rally Team | Ford Fiesta RS WRC | MON | SWE | MEX; 9 | POR | ARG | GRE | NZL; 9 | FIN; Ret | GER | GBR | FRA | ITA | ESP | | | | 28th | 4 |
| 2013 | Hoonigan Racing Division | Ford Fiesta RS WRC | MON | SWE | MEX; 7 | POR | ARG | GRE | ITA | FIN | GER | AUS | FRA | ESP | GBR | | | | 20th | 6 |
| 2014 | M-Sport World Rally Team | Ford Fiesta RS WRC | MON | SWE | MEX | POR | ARG | ITA | POL | FIN | GER | AUS | FRA | ESP; 12 | GBR | | | | NC | 0 |
| 2018 | Hoonigan Racing | Ford Fiesta WRC | MON | SWE | MEX | FRA | ARG | POR | ITA | FIN | GER | TUR | GBR | ESP; Ret | AUS | | | | NC | 0 |

==== PWRC results ====
| Year | Entrant | Car | 1 | 2 | 3 | 4 | 5 | 6 | 7 | 8 | PWRC | Points |
|---|---|---|---|---|---|---|---|---|---|---|---|---|
| 2008 | Subaru Rally Team USA | Subaru Impreza WRX STI | SWE | ARG | GRE | TUR | FIN | NZL; 13 | JPN | GBR | NC | 0 |

=== Complete Global Rallycross Championship results ===
(key)

==== Supercar ====
| Year | Entrant | Car | 1 | 2 | 3 | 4 | 5 | 6 | 7 | 8 | 9 | 10 | 11 | 12 | Rank | Points |
|---|---|---|---|---|---|---|---|---|---|---|---|---|---|---|---|---|
| 2011 | Monster World Rally Team | Ford Fiesta | IRW1 | IRW2 | SEA1 | SEA2 | PIK1 | PIK2 | LA1; 11 | LA2; 13 | | | | | 23rd | 10 |
| 2012 | Monster World Rally Team Ford Racing | Ford Fiesta | CHA; 15 | TEX; 8 | LA; 2 | LOU; 5 | LV; 7 | LVC; 10 | | | | | | | 5th | 58 |
| 2013 | Hoonigan Racing Division | Ford Fiesta ST | BRA; 9 | MUN1; 2 | MUN2; DSQ | LOU; 5 | BRI; 2 | IRW; 6 | ATL; 8 | CHA; 7 | LV; 1 | | | | 3rd | 115 |
| 2014 | Hoonigan Racing Division | Ford Fiesta ST | BAR; 10 | AUS; 11 | DC; 7 | NY; 3 | CHA; 1 | DAY; 2 | LA1; 3 | LA2; 2 | SEA; 9 | LV; 1 | | | 2nd | 376 |
| 2015 | Hoonigan Racing Division | Ford Fiesta ST | FTA; 1 | DAY1; 8 | DAY2; 2 | MCAS; 1 | DET1; 1 | DET2; 7 | DC; 3 | LA1; 11 | LA2; 9 | BAR1; 11 | BAR1; 10 | LV; 10 | 7th | 345 |

=== Complete Americas Rallycross Championship results ===
(key)

==== Supercar ====
| Year | Entrant | Car | 1 | 2 | 3 | 4 | Rank | Points |
|---|---|---|---|---|---|---|---|---|
| 2018 | Hoonigan Racing Division | Ford Focus | SIL | AUS1; 2 | TRO; 3 | AUS2; 6 | 4th | 68 |

=== Complete FIA European Rallycross Championship results ===
(key)

==== Supercar ====
| Year | Entrant | Car | 1 | 2 | 3 | 4 | 5 | Rank | Points |
|---|---|---|---|---|---|---|---|---|---|
| 2014 | Hoonigan Racing Division | Ford Fiesta ST | GBR | NOR; 1 | BEL | GER | ITA | 15th | 16 |

=== Complete FIA World Rallycross Championship results ===
(key)

==== Supercar ====
| Year | Entrant | Car | 1 | 2 | 3 | 4 | 5 | 6 | 7 | 8 | 9 | 10 | 11 | 12 | Rank | Points |
|---|---|---|---|---|---|---|---|---|---|---|---|---|---|---|---|---|
| 2014 | Hoonigan Racing Division | Ford Fiesta ST | POR | GBR | NOR; 3 | FIN | SWE | BEL | CAN | FRA; 4 | GER | ITA | TUR; DNP | ARG | 16th | 32 |
| 2016 | Hoonigan Racing Division | Ford Focus RS | POR; 18 | HOC; 3 | BEL; 19 | GBR; 14 | NOR; 14 | SWE; 13 | CAN; 10 | FRA; 6 | BAR; 16 | LAT; 16 | GER; 12 | ARG; 15 | 14th | 63 |
| 2017 | Hoonigan Racing Division | Ford Focus RS | BAR; 9 | POR; 11 | HOC; 11 | BEL; 8 | GBR; 7 | NOR; 8 | SWE; 9 | CAN; 9 | FRA; 7† | LAT; 14 | GER; 14 | RSA; 8 | 9th | 112 |

^{†} Five championship points deducted for receiving three reprimands in a season.

==== Projekt E ====
| Year | Entrant | Car | 1 | 2 | Rank | Points |
|---|---|---|---|---|---|---|
| 2020 | Hoonigan Racing Division | Ford Fiesta ERX | SWE; 1 | LAT | 2nd | 24 |

== Sources ==
- Davies, Steve (December 9, 2011). "The Accidental Hero – An interview with Ken Block". SkiddMark. Fitch Media. Archived from the original on January 11, 2012.
