= Craig Drew =

British rally co-driver (born 1983)

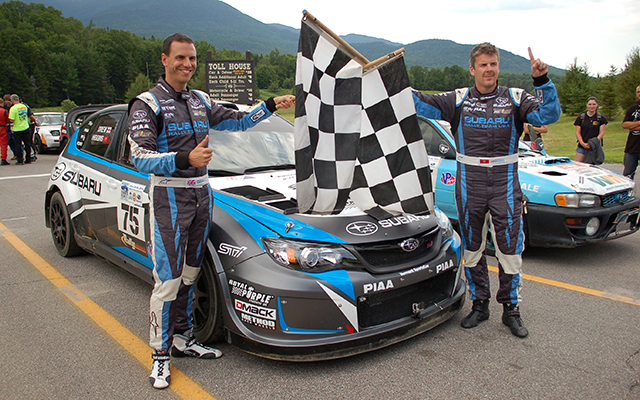
- Drew (left) at the Mount Washington Hillclimb

Personal information
- Nationality: Great Britain
- Born: June 21, 1983 (age 43)

World Rally Championship record
- Years active: 2006–2007, 2015, 2021–2023, 2026
- Driver: (United Kingdom) Wayne Radford (United Kingdom) Simon Harraway (United Kingdom) David Higgins (Sweden) Oliver Solberg (United Kingdom) Chris Ingram (Estonia) Georg Linnamäe (Estonia) Robert Virves (United Kingdom) Philip Allen
- Teams: Hyundai Motorsport
- Rallies: 16
- Championships: 0
- Rally wins: 0
- Podiums: 0
- Stage wins: 0
- First rally: 2006 Wales Rally GB
- Last rally: 2026 Rally Islas Canarias

Craig Drew (born 21 June 1983) is a British rally co-driver. He has won eight American Rally Association championships alongside David Higgins for Subaru Rally Team USA. He co-drove for Oliver Solberg in the 2021 World Rally Championship with Hyundai Motorsport.

Drew competed in the 2022 WRC2 Championship with British driver Chris Ingram.

== Rally results ==
=== Complete WRC results ===
Year	Entrant	Car	1	2	3	4	5	6	7	8	9	10	11	12	13	14	15	16	WDC	Points
2006	Wayne Radford	Mitsubishi Lancer Evo VIII	MON	SWE	MEX	ESP	FRA	ARG	ITA	GRE	GER	FIN	JPN	CYP	TUR	AUS	NZL	GBR; 74	NC	0
2007	Simon Harraway	Subaru Impreza STi N10	MON	SWE	NOR	MEX	POR	ARG	ITA	GRE	FIN	GER	NZL	ESP	FRA	JPN	IRE	GBR; Ret	NC	0
2015	David Higgins	Subaru WRX STI	MON	SWE	MEX	ARG	POR	ITA	POL	FIN	GER	AUS	FRA	ESP	GBR; 20				NC	0
2021	Hyundai Motorsport N	Hyundai i20 N Rally2	MON	ARC	CRO	POR	ITA	KEN	EST	BEL	GRE	FIN; Ret							23rd	6
2021	Hyundai 2C Competition	Hyundai i20 Coupe WRC											ESP; 7	MNZ					23rd	6
2022	Chris Ingram	Škoda Fabia Rally2 evo	MON	SWE	CRO; 11	POR; 12	ITA; 11	KEN		FIN	BEL; 9	GRE; Ret	NZL	ESP	JPN				30th	2
2022	ALM Motorsport	Volkswagen Polo GTI R5							EST; 15										30th	2
2023	Chris Ingram	Škoda Fabia Rally2 evo	MON; 15	SWE	MEX	CRO	POR	ITA	KEN										NC	0
2023	Robert Virves	Ford Fiesta Rally2								EST; 14	FIN; Ret	GRE; Ret	CHL	EUR	JPN				NC	0
2026	Philip Allen	Toyota GR Yaris Rally2	MON	SWE	KEN	CRO	ESP; Ret	POR; 10	JPN	GRE	EST	FIN	PAR	CHL	ITA	SAU			NC	0
