= 2015 Rally America Championship =

2015 Rally America season

Seasons
- ← 2014 2016 →

The 2015 Rally America championship was the eleventh season of the Rally America series. The Rally America series is currently the premiere stage rally championship in the United States. The championship was won by the team of David Higgins and Craig Drew, representing Subaru Rally Team USA in their #75 2015 Subaru Impreza WRX STI. The team completed a perfect season, having won all 8 events. Higgins scored only six points shy of double the score achieved by championship runner's up, Subaru Impreza driver Piotr Fetela. Another Subaru driver, Lauchlin O'Sullivan was third in the championship at season's end.

More than just Higgins, Subaru drivers dominated the championship with only two of 24 podium results not collected by Imprezas. Mitsubishi Lancer driver George Plsek was third at the Oregon Trail Rally and Ford Fiesta driver Ken Block was second at the New England Forest Rally.

The victory was Higgins fifth consecutive title, overtaking Travis Pastrana to become the most successful driver in the history of Rally America.

== Race calendar and results ==
The 2015 Rally America Championship was as follows:

Round	Rally name	Podium finishers				Statistics			
Round	Rally name	Rank	Driver	Car	Time	Stages	Length	Starters	Finishers
1	Sno*Drift Rally, Michigan (30–31 January)	1	(United Kingdom) David Higgins	Subaru WRX STi	2:21:34.5	17	208.32 km	13	9
1	Sno*Drift Rally, Michigan (30–31 January)	2	(United States) Nick Roberts	Subaru Impreza WRX STi	2:30:40.0	17	208.32 km	13	9
1	Sno*Drift Rally, Michigan (30–31 January)	3	(United States) Lauchlin O'Sullivan	Subaru Impreza WRX STi	2:32:47.7	17	208.32 km	13	9
2	Rally in the 100 Acre Wood, Missouri (27–28 February)	1	(United Kingdom) David Higgins	Subaru WRX STi	1:33:58.8	14	145.38 km	17	14
2	Rally in the 100 Acre Wood, Missouri (27–28 February)	2	(Belgium) David Sterckx	Subaru Impreza STi	1:39:41.4	14	145.38 km	17	14
2	Rally in the 100 Acre Wood, Missouri (27–28 February)	3	(Poland) Piotr Fetela	Subaru Impreza STi	1:47:07.6	14	145.38 km	17	14
3	Oregon Trail Rally, Oregon (24–26 April)	1	(United Kingdom) David Higgins	Subaru WRX STi	1:43:57.2	18	185.92 km	19	14
3	Oregon Trail Rally, Oregon (24–26 April)	2	(United States) Adam Yeoman	Subaru Impreza WRX STi	1:46:56.3	18	185.92 km	19	14
3	Oregon Trail Rally, Oregon (24–26 April)	3	(United States) George Plsek	Mitsubishi Lancer Evo IX	1:55:05.8	18	185.92 km	19	14
4	Olympus Rally, Washington (16–17 May)	1	(United Kingdom) David Higgins	Subaru WRX STi	2:06:18.7	14	204.33 km	15	14
4	Olympus Rally, Washington (16–17 May)	2	(United States) Adam Yeoman	Subaru Impreza WRX STi	2:08:08.0	14	204.33 km	15	14
4	Olympus Rally, Washington (16–17 May)	3	(United States) Nick Roberts	Subaru Impreza WRX STi	2:11:17.8	14	204.33 km	15	14
5	Susquehannock Trail Performance Rally, Pennsylvania (5–6 June)	1	(United Kingdom) David Higgins	Subaru WRX STi	1:44:44.2	13	179.56 km	15	12
5	Susquehannock Trail Performance Rally, Pennsylvania (5–6 June)	2	(United States) Adam Yeoman	Subaru Impreza WRX STi	1:50:15.9	13	179.56 km	15	12
5	Susquehannock Trail Performance Rally, Pennsylvania (5–6 June)	3	(United States) Nick Roberts	Subaru Impreza WRX STi	1:52:43.0	13	179.56 km	15	12
6	New England Forest Rally, Maine (17–18 July)	1	(United Kingdom) David Higgins	Subaru WRX STi	1:30:19.9	13	187.97 km	24	16
6	New England Forest Rally, Maine (17–18 July)	2	(United States) Ken Block	Ford Fiesta H.F.H.V.	1:35:52.2	13	187.97 km	24	16
6	New England Forest Rally, Maine (17–18 July)	3	(United States) Travis Pastrana	Subaru Impreza WRX STi	1:39:40.5	13	187.97 km	24	16
7	Ojibwe Forests Rally, Minnesota (27–29 August)	1	(United Kingdom) David Higgins	Subaru WRX STi	2:10:33.9	15	213.74 km	15	10
7	Ojibwe Forests Rally, Minnesota (27–29 August)	2	(United States) Travis Pastrana	Subaru Impreza WRX STi	2:13:58.1	15	213.74 km	15	10
7	Ojibwe Forests Rally, Minnesota (27–29 August)	3	(United States) Nick Roberts	Subaru Impreza WRX STi	2:19:01.8	15	213.74 km	15	10
8	Lake Superior Performance Rally, Michigan (16–17 October)	1	(United Kingdom) David Higgins	Subaru WRX STi	1:35:50.7	14	178.22 km	16	13
8	Lake Superior Performance Rally, Michigan (16–17 October)	2	(United States) Adam Yeoman	Subaru Impreza WRX STi	1:37:42.0	14	178.22 km	16	13
8	Lake Superior Performance Rally, Michigan (16–17 October)	3	(United States) Lauchlin O'Sullivan	Subaru Impreza WRX STi	1:43:19.9	14	178.22 km	16	13

== Championship standings ==
This table represents the championship standings from the 2015 Rally America season. Competitors that start each event get one point, competitors that finish get another point, and then further points are determined by placing order at the end of the event. 1st place receives 20 points, 2nd place receives 15 points, 3rd receives 12 points and so on. The table to the underneath shows how points are distributed.

Pos.	No.	Class	Position In Class	Driver	Co-Driver	Car	Sno*Drift	100 Acre Wood	Oregon Trail	Olympus	Sesquehannock Trail Performance Rally	New England Forest Rally	Ojibwe Forest Rally	Lake Superior Performance Rally	Total
1	75	Open	1	David Higgins	Craig Drew	2015 Subaru Impreza WRX STI	1st 22 Points	1st 22 Points	1st 22 Points	1st 22 Points	1st 22 Points	1st 22 Points	1st 2 Points*	1st 2 Points*	136
2	90	Super Production	1	Lauchlin O'Sullivan	Scott Putnam	2009 Subaru Impreza WRX STI	3rd 12 Points	11th 3 Points*	5th 10 Points	8th 5 Points*	4th 12 Points	4th 12 Points	4th 12 Points	3rd 14 Points	78
3	94	Open	2	Piotr Fetela	John Hall	1998 Subaru Impreza WRX STI	4th 12 Points	3rd 14 Points	4th 12 Points	5th 10 Points	5th 10 Points	7th 6 Points*	5th 10 Points*	4th 12 Points	74
4	425	Open	3	Adam Yeoman	Jordan Schulze	2007 Subaru Impreza WRX STI	DNF 1 Point	DNF 1 Point	2nd 17 Points	2nd 17 Points	2nd 17 Points	DNF 1 Point*	DNF 1 Point*	2nd 17 Points	72
5	202	Super Production	3	Nick Roberts	Rhianon Gelsomino	2013 Subaru Impreza WRX STI	2nd 17 Points	DNF 1 Point	DNF 1 Point	3rd 14 Points	3rd 14 Points	DNF 1 Point*	3rd 14 Points	DNS 0 Points	62
6	22	2WD	1	Troy Miller	Ole Holter	2011 Ford Fiesta R2	6th 8 Points	6th 8 Points	7th 6 Points	12th 3 Points	6th 8 Points	9th 4 Points	10th 2 Points*	DNS 0 Points	39
7	30	Open	4	George Plsek	Nathalie Richard	2006 Mitsubishi Evo IX	DNS 0 Points	DNS 0 Points	3rd 14 Points	4th 12 Points	DNS 0 Points	DNS 0 Points	DNS 0 Points	5th 10 Points	36
8	989	Open	5	Brenten Kelly	Niall Burns	2007 Subaru Impreza WRX STI	7th 6 Points	4th 12 Points	6th 8 Points	6th 8 Points	DNS 0 Points	DNS 0 Points	DNF 1 Point	DNF 1 Point	36
9	824	2WD	3	Cameron Steely	Preston Osborn	2014 Ford Fiesta 5D ST	9th 4 Points	5th 10 Points	DNF 1 Point	9th 4 Points	DNF 1 Point*	12th 3 Points	6th 8 Points	DNF 1 Point*	32
10	199	Open	6	Travis Pastrana	Christine Beavis	2014 Subaru Impreza WRX STI	DNS 0 Points	DNS 0 Points	DNS 0 Points	DNS 0 Points	DNS 0 Points	3rd 14 Points	2nd 17 Points	DNS 0 Points	31

*In the above table, where noted, certain events and their points are dropped from the championship total. This is because there are only 6 allowed events in the national championship. This allows competitors that race in all 8 events to drop their two worst scores leaving them with 6 total races. In cases such as Higgins, there is little strategy involved since he won all 8 events and they all weighed equally on his score. In O'Sullivans case, however, eliminating the two worst races brings the score into balance. Without this measure, Piotr Fetela would have bested O'Sullivan because of total outright points. However, any starting and finishing points will count towards a competitors total, which is why Higgins' omissions are worth 2 points, for example.

Position	Points
1st	20
2nd	15
3rd	12
4th	10
5th	8
6th	6
7th	4
8th	3
9th	2
10th-last	1
