= 2014 Rally America Championship =

Sports tournament

2014 Rally America season

Seasons
- ← 2013 2015 →

The 2014 Rally America Championship was the tenth season of the Rally America Championship, the premier rally championship in the United States. The season began 24 January in Michigan, and returned to Michigan for the Lake Superior Performance Rally, the final round of the season, on 18 October after eight events.

The championship was won by defending champion David Higgins. Higgins won the season opening Sno*Drift Rally and while he retired from Rally in the 100 Acre Wood he then went on to win four events in a row, wrapping up the championship early at the New England Forest Rally with two rallies still to be held. Higgins finished 57 points clear of Adam Yeoman, and 59 points ahead of Dillon van Way. Yeoman took four podium finishes with a best of second at the Ojibwe Forests Rally, while van Way achieved his position through consistent top six finishes in all eight rallies held, peaking with a third place at the Mt. Washington Hillclimb. The championship victory meant Higgins joined Travis Pastrana as a four-time Rally America champion. Both drivers achieved their four titles consecutively, dominating their periods of competition.

== Race calendar and results ==
The 2014 Rally America Championship was as follows:

| Round | Rally name | Podium finishers | | | | Statistics | | | |
| Round | Rally name | Rank | Driver | Car | Time | Stages | Length | Starters | Finishers |
|---|---|---|---|---|---|---|---|---|---|
| 1 | Sno*Drift Rally, Michigan (24–25 January) | 1 | (United Kingdom) David Higgins | Subaru Impreza WRX STi | 2:28:30.7 | 20 | 209.82 km | 19 | 16 |
| 1 | Sno*Drift Rally, Michigan (24–25 January) | 2 | (Canada) Antoine L'Estage | Mitsubishi Lancer Evo X | 2:30:41.2 | 20 | 209.82 km | 19 | 16 |
| 1 | Sno*Drift Rally, Michigan (24–25 January) | 3 | (United States) Lauchlin O'Sullivan | Subaru Impreza WRX STi | 2:41:42.3 | 20 | 209.82 km | 19 | 16 |
| 2 | Rally in the 100 Acre Wood, Missouri (21–22 February) | 1 | (United States) Ken Block | Ford Fiesta | 1:37:38.8 | 17 | 205.35 km | 25 | 18 |
| 2 | Rally in the 100 Acre Wood, Missouri (21–22 February) | 2 | (United States) Travis Pastrana | Subaru Impreza WRX STi | 1:42:37.3 | 17 | 205.35 km | 25 | 18 |
| 2 | Rally in the 100 Acre Wood, Missouri (21–22 February) | 3 | (United States) Adam Yeoman | Subaru Impreza WRX STi | 1:46:25.0 | 17 | 205.35 km | 25 | 18 |
| 3 | Oregon Trail Rally, Oregon (2–4 May) | 1 | (United Kingdom) David Higgins | Subaru Impreza WRX STi | 1:44:52.8 | 18 | 186.35 km | 20 | 15 |
| 3 | Oregon Trail Rally, Oregon (2–4 May) | 2 | (United States) Travis Pastrana | Subaru Impreza WRX STi | 1:48:30.2 | 18 | 186.35 km | 20 | 15 |
| 3 | Oregon Trail Rally, Oregon (2–4 May) | 3 | (United States) Adam Yeoman | Subaru Impreza WRX STi | 1:51:54.5 | 18 | 186.35 km | 20 | 15 |
| 4 | Susquehannock Trail Performance Rally, Pennsylvania (30–31 May) | 1 | (United Kingdom) David Higgins | Subaru Impreza WRX STi | 1:34:52.3 | 15 | 190.59 km | 22 | 15 |
| 4 | Susquehannock Trail Performance Rally, Pennsylvania (30–31 May) | 2 | (United States) George Plsek | Mitsubishi Lancer Evo IX | 1:44:21.7 | 15 | 190.59 km | 22 | 15 |
| 4 | Susquehannock Trail Performance Rally, Pennsylvania (30–31 May) | 3 | (United States) Nick Roberts | Subaru Impreza WRX STi | 1:45:25.5 | 15 | 190.59 km | 22 | 15 |
| 5 | Mount Washington Hillclimb Auto Race, New Hampshire (27–29 June) | 1 | (United Kingdom) David Higgins | Subaru Impreza WRX STi | 24:51.3 | 6 | 47.64 km | 15 | 13 |
| 5 | Mount Washington Hillclimb Auto Race, New Hampshire (27–29 June) | 2 | (United States) Travis Pastrana | Subaru Impreza WRX STi | 26:28.5 | 6 | 47.64 km | 15 | 13 |
| 5 | Mount Washington Hillclimb Auto Race, New Hampshire (27–29 June) | 3 | (United States) Dillon Van Way | Subaru Impreza WRX STi | 29:05.5 | 6 | 47.64 km | 15 | 13 |
| 6 | New England Forest Rally, Maine (18–19 July) | 1 | (United Kingdom) David Higgins | Subaru Impreza WRX STi | 1:24:53.3 | 13 | 161.79 km | 21 | 16 |
| 6 | New England Forest Rally, Maine (18–19 July) | 2 | (United States) Travis Pastrana | Subaru Impreza WRX STi | 1:25:37.6 | 13 | 161.79 km | 21 | 16 |
| 6 | New England Forest Rally, Maine (18–19 July) | 3 | (United States) Adam Yeoman | Subaru Impreza WRX STi | 1:31:53.7 | 13 | 161.79 km | 21 | 16 |
| 7 | Ojibwe Forests Rally, Minnesota (22–23 August) | 1 | (United Kingdom) David Higgins | Subaru Impreza WRX STi | 2:20:32.1 | 16 | 221.62 km | 18 | 13 |
| 7 | Ojibwe Forests Rally, Minnesota (22–23 August) | 2 | (United States) Adam Yeoman | Subaru Impreza WRX STi | 2:33:09.6 | 16 | 221.62 km | 18 | 13 |
| 7 | Ojibwe Forests Rally, Minnesota (22–23 August) | 3 | (United States) Lauchlin O'Sullivan | Subaru Impreza WRX STi | 2:34:12.9 | 16 | 221.62 km | 18 | 13 |
| 8 | Lake Superior Performance Rally, Michigan (17–18 October) | 1 | (United Kingdom) David Higgins | Subaru Impreza WRX STi | 1:56:25.6 | 16 | 204.24 km | 19 | 14 |
| 8 | Lake Superior Performance Rally, Michigan (17–18 October) | 2 | (United States) Nick Roberts | Subaru Impreza WRX STi | 2:08:20.7 | 16 | 204.24 km | 19 | 14 |
| 8 | Lake Superior Performance Rally, Michigan (17–18 October) | 3 | (Canada) Andrew Comrie-Picard | Ford Fiesta ST | 2:09:40.6 | 16 | 204.24 km | 19 | 14 |

== Championship standings ==
Drivers scoring at least ten points are shown. The 2014 Rally America Championship points are as follows:

| Pos. | Driver | Vehicle | MI | MO | OR | PA | NH | ME | MN | MI | Total |
|---|---|---|---|---|---|---|---|---|---|---|---|
| 1 | (United Kingdom) David Higgins | Subaru Impreza WRX STi | 1 | Ret | 1 | 1 | 1 | 1 | 1 | 1 | 135 |
| 2 | (United States) Adam Yeoman | Subaru Impreza WRX STi | 9 | 3 | 3 | Ret | 11 | 3 | 2 | 4 | 78 |
| 3 | (United States) Dillon van Way | Subaru Impreza WRX STi; Ford Fiesta R2 | 4 | 5 | 5 | 4 | 3 | 4 | 4 | 6 | 76 |
| 4 | (United States) Travis Pastrana | Subaru Impreza WRX STi | | 2 | 2 | | 2 | 2 | Ret | Ret | 70 |
| 5 | (United States) Nick Roberts | Subaru Impreza WRX STi | 6 | 4 | Ret | 3 | 13 | Ret | 5 | 2 | 66 |
| 6 | (Canada) Andrew Comrie-Picard | Ford Fiesta ST | 13 | 8 | 9 | 9 | 4 | 6 | 8 | 3 | 52 |
| 7 | (United States) Lauchlin O'Sullivan | Subaru Impreza WRX STi | 3 | | 7 | | | | 3 | 10 | 37 |
| 8 | (Belgium) David Sterckx | Subaru Impreza WRX STi | 7 | 6 | 4 | | | | 9 | 11 | 33 |
| 9 | (United States) Peter Fetela | Subaru Impreza WRX STi | Ret | Ret | | 14 | | 5 | 7 | 5 | 31 |
| 10 | (United States) George Plsek | Mitsubishi Lancer Evo X | | | 6 | 2 | | | 10 | | 28 |
| 11 | (United States) Panos Karpidas | Ford Fiesta R2 | 14 | Ret | 14 | 11 | 6 | 14 | 11 | 12 | 26 |
| 12 | (United States) Troy Miller | Ford Fiesta R2 | 10 | 10 | | 8 | Ret | 8 | 6 | | 25 |
| 13 | (United States) Ken Block | Ford Fiesta | | 1 | | | | | | | 22 |
| 14 | (United States) Evan Cline | Subaru Impreza WRX STi | | 7 | | 5 | | | | 7 | 22 |
| 15 | (United States) Cameron Steely | Ford Fiesta R1 | | 12 | | Ret | 5 | Ret | 13 | 15 | 21 |
| 16 | (Canada) Antoine L'Estage | Mitsubishi Lancer Evo X | 2 | Ret | | | | | | | 18 |
| 17 | (United States) James Robinson | Honda Fit | 11 | 15 | 13 | 12 | | 12 | 12 | | 18 |
| 18 | (United States) Matthew Johnson | Scion xD | 8 | 9 | Ret | | | 7 | | | 16 |
| 19 | (United States) Ryan Wilcox | Subaru Impreza Outback Sport STi | | 13 | | 10 | 8 | 15 | | | 14 |
| 20 | (United States) Mickey Moran | Subaru Impreza WRX | 15 | 18 | 10 | Ret | | 11 | Ret | | 14 |
| 21 | (Canada) Alexandre Béland | Subaru Impreza WRX | 5 | Ret | | | | | | | 11 |
| 22 | (United States) Garry Gill | Subaru Impreza WRX | | | | 7 | | 9 | | | 10 |
| 23 | (United States) Hawk Miller | Subaru Impreza WRX STi | 16 | | 12 | 13 | | | Ret | | 10 |

Key
| Colour | Result |
|---|---|
| Gold | Winner |
| Silver | 2nd place |
| Bronze | 3rd place |
| Green | Points finish |
| Blue | Non-points finish |
| Blue | Non-classified finish (NC) |
| Purple | Did not finish (Ret) |
| Black | Excluded (EX) |
| Black | Disqualified (DSQ) |
| White | Did not start (DNS) |
| White | Cancelled (C) |
| Blank | Withdrew entry from the event (WD) |
