= David Higgins (rally driver) =

British rally driver (born 1972)

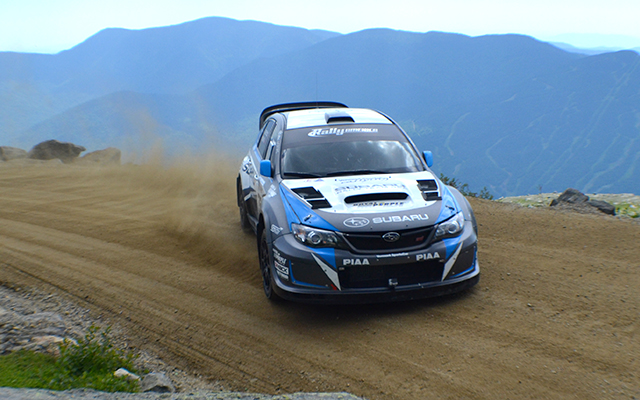
- David Higgins' Subaru Rally Car
- Nationality: (Isle of Man) Manx (United Kingdom) British
- Born: 14 November 1972 (age 54) Isle of Man
- Relatives: Mark Higgins (brother)

American Rally Association career
- Debut season: 2017
- Current team: McKenna Motorsport
- Car number: 75
- Former teams: Subaru Motorsports USA
- Championships: 2 (2018, 2019)

Rally America
- Car number: 75
- Championships: 8 (2002, 2003, 2011, 2012, 2013, 2014, 2015, 2016)
- Best finish: 1st in 2002–2003, 2011–2016

David Higgins (born 14 November 1972) is a Manx rally driver. He is an eight-time Rally America champion and a two-time ARA Champion with Subaru Motorsports USA.

== Early and personal life ==
Born on the Isle of Man but living in Trefeglwys near Llanidloes, Powys, Wales his brother Mark is also a rally and stunt driver. Higgins started motorcycle trials at the age of eight, and at the age of ten, he moved into the UK national kart racing circuit, winning seven titles against drivers including later Formula 1 driver David Coulthard.

Higgins stills lives in Trefeglwys, with his wife and two children, Alicia and Matthew, both of whom are karting drivers.

== Career ==
In 1993, Higgins won his first rally car title, the Peugeot Challenge. Higgins won the 1997, 1999 and 2002 British Rally Championships in the Group N category. He then won the SCCA ProRally Championship in the United States in 2002 and 2003. Grassroots Motorsports presented David Higgins with the Editors' Choice Award in 2003. In 2004, he returned to the British championship for what was supposed to be a one-off entry at the season opener in a Hyundai Accent WRC. After winning the opening round, he went on to complete the full season, winning the title. From 2004, Higgins spent his time rallying in China. He began in 2004, competing in three events and winning two of them to help Ralliart Hong Kong to win the teams' title. He returned in 2006, beginning a long relationship with the Wanyu rally team. In 2007, he won every round in the championship and helped the team to win the title in both 2007 and 2009.

In 2011, Higgins joined Subaru Rally Team USA in the Rally America series as a replacement for Travis Pastrana. He won the title at the first attempt with three wins from six events. That same year he also set the new record up Mount Washington in a Subaru Impreza, faster than Pastrana's run up the mountain. Later, in 2014, he would beat his own record again with Co-Driver Craig Drew. He won the Rally America championship eight times in 2002, 2003, 2011, 2012, 2013, 2014, 2015, and 2016. He also won the American Rally Association National Championship in 2018 and 2019. Of those ten championships, Higgins achieved eight with Subaru Rally Team USA.

During the running of the 2007 Rally of Yorkshire, Higgins came across a JCB digger/tractor coming towards him on the seven mile Gale Rigg stage. Luckily, Higgins was able to swerve and avoid the JCB, whose driver had managed to avoid rally officials and get onto the stage, driving in the reverse direction to the competing cars.

== Racing record ==
=== Complete WRC results ===
Year	Entrant	Car	1	2	3	4	5	6	7	8	9	10	11	12	13	14	15	16	WDC	Points
1994	Peugeot Sport	Peugeot 106 Rallye	MON	POR	KEN	FRA	GRE	ARG	NZL	FIN	ITA	GBR; Ret							-	0
1995	David Higgins	Honda Civic SIR	MON	SWE	POR	FRA	NZL	AUS	ESP	GBR; 27									-	0
1997	David Higgins	Rover Mini Cooper	MON	SWE	KEN	POR	ESP	FRA	ARG	GRE	NZL	FIN	IDN	ITA	AUS; Ret				-	0
1997	David Higgins	Seat Ibiza GTi 16V														GBR; 31			-	0
1998	David Higgins	Subaru Impreza WRX	MON	SWE	KEN	POR	ESP	FRA	ARG	GRE	NZL	FIN	ITA	AUS	GBR; 11				-	0
1999	FAW-Volkswagen FRD RT	Volkswagen Golf Kit Car	MON	SWE	KEN	POR	ESP	FRA	ARG	GRE	NZL	FIN	CHN; Ret	ITA	AUS				-	0
1999	David Higgins	Subaru Impreza WRX														GBR; Ret			-	0
2000	David Higgins	Subaru Impreza WRX	MON	SWE	KEN	POR	ESP	ARG	GRE	NZL	FIN	CYP	FRA	ITA	AUS	GBR; Ret			-	0
2001	David Higgins	Subaru Impreza WRX	MON	SWE	POR	ESP	ARG	CYP	GRE	KEN	FIN	NZL	ITA	FRA	AUS	GBR; 11			-	0
2002	David Higgins	Subaru Impreza WRC '99	MON	SWE	FRA	ESP	CYP	ARG	GRE	KEN	FIN	GER	ITA	NZL	AUS	GBR; Ret			-	0
2005	David Higgins	Opel Corsa S1600	MON	SWE	MEX	NZL	ITA	CYP	TUR; 31	GRE	ARG	FIN	GER						-	0
2005	David Higgins	Mitsubishi Lancer Evo VII												GBR; 24	JPN	FRA	ESP	AUS	-	0
2006	David Higgins	Mitsubishi Lancer Evo VII	MON; 21	SWE	MEX	ESP	FRA	ARG	ITA	GRE	GER	FIN	JPN	CYP	TUR	AUS	NZL		-	0
2006	David Higgins	Mitsubishi Lancer Evo IX																GBR; 18	-	0
2007	David Higgins	Subaru Impreza WRX STi	MON	SWE	NOR	MEX	POR	ARG	ITA	GRE	FIN	GER	NZL	ESP	FRA	JPN	IRE	GBR; 19	-	0
2008	David Higgins	Subaru Impreza WRX STi	MON	SWE	MEX	ARG	JOR	ITA	GRE	TUR	FIN	GER	NZL	ESP	FRA	JPN	GBR; 28		-	0

=== Complete Global RallyCross Championship results ===
==== AWD ====
Year	Entrant	Car	1	2	3	4	5	6	7	8	GRC	Points
2011	Subaru Rally Team USA	Subaru Impreza GR WRX STI	IRW1	IRW2	SEA1	SEA2	PIK1; 4	PIK2; 2	LA1; 3	LA2; 7	7th	57

==== Supercar ====
Year	Entrant	Car	1	2	3	4	5	6	7	8	9	10	11	12	GRC	Points
2012	Subaru Puma Rallycross Team USA	Subaru Impreza WRX STI	CHA	TEX	LA; 7	LOU	LV	LVC							19th	10
2016	Subaru Rally Team USA	Subaru Impreza WRX STI	PHO1	PHO2	DAL	DAY1	DAY2	MCAS1	MCAS2^{†}	DC	AC	SEA; 9	LA1; 6	LA2; 9	13th	57

^{†}Race cancelled.
