= 2013 Rally America season =

Seasons
- ← 2012 2014 →

The 2013 Rally America Championship is the ninth season of the Rally America Championship. This championship is the premier rally championship in the United States. The season began 25 January in Michigan, and is scheduled to return to Michigan for the Lake Superior Performance Rally on 19 October after seven events.

The championship was won by British driver David Higgins, his third consecutive championship victory. Higgins and co-driver Craig Drew took their Subaru Impreza to wins in the Rally in the 100 Acre Wood, Oregon Trail Rally and Lake Superior Performance Rally and finished in the top three placings in all seven rallies. Higgins finished 26 points ahead of Ford Fiesta driver Ken Block who won three of the other four events.

== Race calendar and results ==
The 2013 Rally America Championship is as follows:

Round	Rally name	Podium finishers				Statistics			
Round	Rally name	Rank	Driver	Car	Time	Stages	Length	Starters	Finishers
1	Sno*Drift Rally, Michigan (25–26 January)	1	(Canada) Antoine L'Estage	Mitsubishi Lancer Evo X	2:24:22.0	20	211.3 km	23	18
1	Sno*Drift Rally, Michigan (25–26 January)	2	(United Kingdom) David Higgins	Subaru Impreza WRX STi	2:24.28.2	20	211.3 km	23	18
1	Sno*Drift Rally, Michigan (25–26 January)	3	(Canada) Leonid Urlichich	Subaru Impreza WRX STi	2:36:12.4	20	211.3 km	23	18
2	Rally in the 100 Acre Wood, Missouri (22–23 February)	1	(United Kingdom) David Higgins	Subaru Impreza WRX STi	1:58:54.7	17	208.3 km	27	23
2	Rally in the 100 Acre Wood, Missouri (22–23 February)	2	(United States) Joseph Burke	Mitsubishi Lancer Evo IX	2:07:45.9	17	208.3 km	27	23
2	Rally in the 100 Acre Wood, Missouri (22–23 February)	3	(United States) Lauchlin O'Sullivan	Subaru Impreza WRX STi	2:10:39.8	17	208.3 km	27	23
3	Oregon Trail Rally, Oregon (3–5 May)	1	(United Kingdom) David Higgins	Subaru Impreza WRX STi	1:46:47.0	17	182.8 km	29	18
3	Oregon Trail Rally, Oregon (3–5 May)	2	(United States) Ken Block	Ford Fiesta	1:48:34.8	17	182.8 km	29	18
3	Oregon Trail Rally, Oregon (3–5 May)	3	(Indonesia) Rifat Sungkar	Mitsubishi Lancer Evo X	1:55:40.6	17	182.8 km	29	18
4	Susquehannock Trail Rally, Pennsylvania (31 May–1 June)	1	(United States) Ken Block	Ford Fiesta	1:44:11.8	16	183.6 km	23	17
4	Susquehannock Trail Rally, Pennsylvania (31 May–1 June)	2	(Belgium) David Sterckx	Subaru Impreza WRX STi	1:54:28.1	16	183.6 km	23	17
4	Susquehannock Trail Rally, Pennsylvania (31 May–1 June)	3	(United Kingdom) David Higgins	Subaru Impreza WRX STi	1:54:55.2	16	183.6 km	23	17
5	New England Forest Rally, Maine (26–27 July)	1	(United States) Ken Block	Ford Fiesta	1:34:34.2	13	183.64 km	25	16
5	New England Forest Rally, Maine (26–27 July)	2	(United Kingdom) David Higgins	Subaru Impreza WRX STi	1:34:40.7	13	183.64 km	25	16
5	New England Forest Rally, Maine (26–27 July)	3	(Indonesia) Rifat Sungkar	Mitsubishi Lancer Evo X	1:44:57.0	13	183.64 km	25	16
6	Ojibwe Forests Rally, Minnesota (23–24 August)	1	(United States) Ken Block	Ford Fiesta	2:14:57.9	15	138.74 km	18	13
6	Ojibwe Forests Rally, Minnesota (23–24 August)	2	(United Kingdom) David Higgins	Subaru Impreza WRX STi	2:20:31.1	15	138.74 km	18	13
6	Ojibwe Forests Rally, Minnesota (23–24 August)	3	(Australia) Brendan Reeves	Ford Fiesta R2	2:33:06.0	15	138.74 km	18	13
7	Lake Superior Performance Rally, Michigan (18–19 October)	1	(United Kingdom) David Higgins	Subaru Impreza WRX STi	1:20:01.0	17	155.82 km	20	16
7	Lake Superior Performance Rally, Michigan (18–19 October)	2	(Canada) Antoine L'Estage	Subaru Impreza WRX STi	1:23:42.5	17	155.82 km	20	16
7	Lake Superior Performance Rally, Michigan (18–19 October)	3	(United States) Dillon van Way	Subaru Impreza WRX STi	1:31:33.6	17	155.82 km	20	16

== Championship standings ==
Drivers scoring at least ten points are shown. Lauchlin O'Sullivan scored 16 points, but later received a 20-point penalty. The 2013 Rally America Championship points are as follows:

Position	Driver	Vehicle	MI	MO	OR	PA	ME	MN	MI	Total
1	(United Kingdom) David Higgins	Subaru Impreza WRX STi	2	1	1	3	2	2	1	119
2	(United States) Ken Block	Ford Fiesta	6	Ret	2	1	1	1	Ret	93
3	(Belgium) David Sterckx	Subaru Impreza WRX STi	Ret	5	4	2	4	10	7	61
4	(Australia) Brendan Reeves	Ford Fiesta R2			5	4	5	3	4	58
5	(Canada) Antoine L'Estage	Mitsubishi Lancer Evo X Subaru Impreza WRX STi	1	Ret	Ret		Ret	Ret	2	43
6	(Canada) Andrew Comrie-Picard	Scion xD	8	7	14	5	8	9	5	42
7	(United States) Dillon van Way	Ford Fiesta; Subaru Impreza WRX STi	9	Ret	8	9	6		3	37
8	(Indonesia) Rifat Sungkar	Mitsubishi Lancer Evo X			3	11	3	Ret	Ret	33
9	(United States) Adam Yoeman	Subaru Impreza WRX STi	5	8	Ret	Ret	Ret	4	Ret	31
10	(United States) Nick Roberts	Subaru Impreza WRX STi	11	12	Ret	Ret	10	5	6	29
11	(Poland) Peter Fetela	Subaru Impreza WRX STi		6	Ret	7	6		12	26
12	(United States) Chris Greenhouse	Dodge Neon SRT-4	13	15	15	14	12	7	9	24
13	(United States) Mason Moyle	Subaru Impreza WRX STi	10	14	12	10	9	8	Ret	22
14	(United States) Evan Cline	Subaru Impreza WRX STi	7	4	11					21
15	(United States) James Robinson	Honda Fit	15	21	Ret	13	14	11	15	20
16	(United States) Brent Hercelinsky	Ford Fiesta R2	17	22	16	12	Ret	13	14	19
17	(United States) Joseph Burke	Mitsubishi Lancer Evo IX		2			Ret			18
18	(United States) George Plsek	Mitsubishi Lancer Evo IX			9	6			8	17
19	(United States) Verena Mei	Ford Fiesta	14	18	Ret	17	15	12		16
20	(Canada) Leonid Urlichich	Subaru Impreza WRX	3							14
21	(Canada) Ugo Desgreniers	Subaru Impreza WRX STi	4				Ret			13
22	(United States) Tracey Gardiner	Toyota Yaris					16		16	12
23	(United States) Timothy Penasack	Subaru Impreza WRX STi				15	11	Ret	10	10
-	(United States) Lauchlin O'Sullivan	Subaru Impreza WRX STi		3	Ret			Ret		0

Key
Colour	Result
Gold	Winner
Silver	2nd place
Bronze	3rd place
Green	Points finish
Blue	Non-points finish
Blue	Non-classified finish (NC)
Purple	Did not finish (Ret)
Black	Excluded (EX)
Black	Disqualified (DSQ)
White	Did not start (DNS)
White	Cancelled (C)
Blank	Withdrew entry from the event (WD)
