= Travis Pastrana =

American racing driver and stunt performer (born 1983)

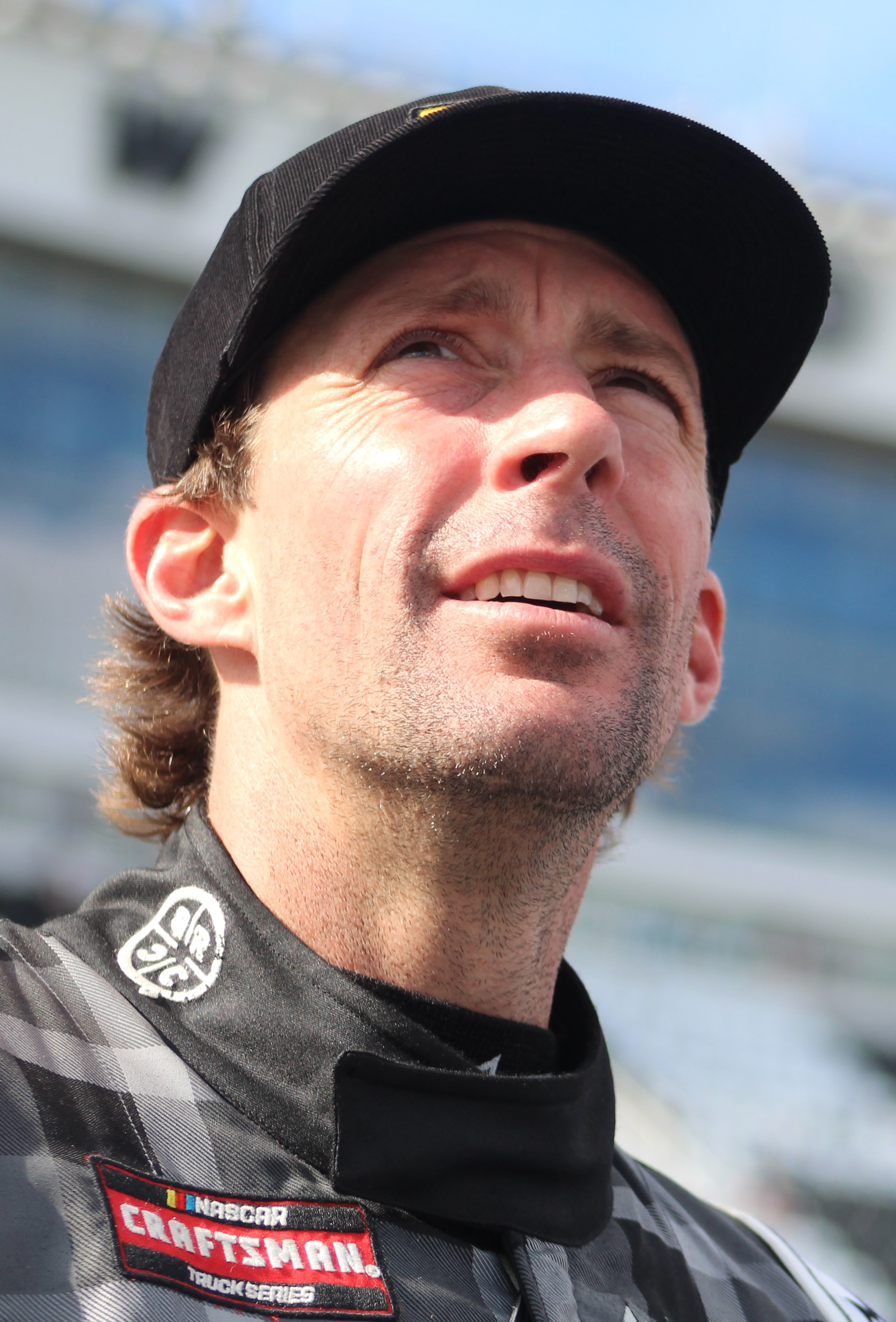
- Pastrana at Daytona International Speedway in 2023
- Born: Travis Alan Pastrana; October 8, 1983 (age 43) Annapolis, Maryland, U.S.
- Relatives: Lyn-Z Adams Hawkins (wife); Alan Pastrana (uncle)

Nitro Rallycross career
- Debut season: 2021
- Current team: Subaru Motorsports USA
- Car number: 199
- Starts: 5
- Championships: 1
- Wins: 2
- Best finish: 1st in 2021

Previous series
- 2023 2012–2013 2012, 2015, 2017, 2020, 2026 2012 2011–2012 2011 2005–2010: NASCAR Cup Series; NASCAR Nationwide Series; NASCAR Craftsman Truck Series; Rolex Sports Car Series; K&N Pro Series East; K&N Pro Series West; Rally America

Championship titles
- 2021 2017 2006–2009 2001 2000: Nitro Rallycross; American Rally Association; Rally America; AMA Supercross 125cc AMA Motocross 125cc

NASCAR Cup Series career
- 1 race run over 1 year
- 2023 position: 37th
- Best finish: 37th (2023)
- First race: 2023 Daytona 500 (Daytona)
Wins	Top tens	Poles
0	0	0

NASCAR O'Reilly Auto Parts Series career
- 42 races run over 2 years
- 2013 position: 14th
- Best finish: 14th (2013)
- First race: 2012 Virginia 529 College Savings 250 (Richmond)
- Last race: 2013 Ford EcoBoost 300 (Homestead)
Wins	Top tens	Poles
0	4	1

NASCAR FedEx Freight Truck Series career
- 8 races run over 6 years
- 2026 position: 52nd
- Best finish: 51st (2020)
- First race: 2012 Smith's 350 (Las Vegas)
- Last race: 2026 North Carolina Education Lottery 200 (Charlotte)
Wins	Top tens	Poles
0	0	0
- Statistics up to date as of November 6, 2026.
- Sports career
- Sport: Rally, Motocross, freeride mountain biking, BASE jumping, NASCAR, monster truck freestyle
- Events: X Games, Gravity Games, Red Bull X-Fighters, Dew Tour, Rally America
Medal record
Summer X Games
Representing United States
Gold medal – first place	1999 San Francisco	Moto X Freestyle
Gold medal – first place	2000 San Francisco	Moto X Freestyle
Gold medal – first place	2001 Philadelphia	Moto X Freestyle
Gold medal – first place	2003 Los Angeles	Moto X Freestyle
Gold medal – first place	2005 Los Angeles	Moto X Freestyle
Gold medal – first place	2006 Los Angeles	Moto X Freestyle
Gold medal – first place	2006 Los Angeles	Moto X Best Trick
Gold medal – first place	2006 Los Angeles	Rally Car
Gold medal – first place	2008 Los Angeles	Rally Car
Gold medal – first place	2010 Los Angeles	Moto X Speed & Style
Gold medal – first place	2010 Los Angeles	Moto X Freestyle
Silver medal – second place	2001 Philadelphia	Moto X Step Up
Silver medal – second place	2004 Los Angeles	Moto X Freestyle
Silver medal – second place	2005 Los Angeles	Moto X Best Trick
Silver medal – second place	2009 Los Angeles	Rally Car
Bronze medal – third place	2004 Los Angeles	Moto X Best Trick
Bronze medal – third place	2007 Los Angeles	Rally Car
Gravity Games
Gold medal – first place	1999 Providence	Moto X Freestyle
Gold medal – first place	1999 Providence	Moto X Freestyle Team
Gold medal – first place	2001 Providence	Moto X Freestyle
Gold medal – first place	2002 Cleveland	Moto X Freestyle
Gold medal – first place	2006 Perth	Moto X Freestyle
Silver medal – second place	2003 Cleveland	Moto X Freestyle

Travis Alan Pastrana (born October 8, 1983) is an American professional athlete known for his success across multiple disciplines, including freestyle motocross, rally racing, NASCAR, and stunt performance. He rose to prominence in the early 2000s, becoming a multi-time X Games gold medalist and achieving numerous milestones in freestyle motocross, including being the first to land a double backflip in competition in 2006. Prior to his freestyle career, Pastrana was also a successful motorcycle racer, winning titles in the AMA Motocross and Supercross 125cc divisions in 2000 and 2001, respectively.

Outside of motorcycles, Pastrana is a four-time Rally America champion and has competed in Global RallyCross. Pastrana has also made appearances in NASCAR, including stints in the Nationwide Series and the Truck Series. In 2022, he became a world champion in Class 1 World Powerboat Championship alongside British offshore powerboat racer Steve Curtis.

In 2003, Pastrana co-founded Nitro Circus, an entertainment brand that produces live shows, television series, and films featuring extreme stunts and action sports performances. Separate from Nitro Circus, Pastrana has participated in several high-profile stunts, including successful recreations of stunts made famous by Evel Knievel.

== Career ==
=== Motorcycle racing ===
Pastrana debuted in the AMA Motocross Championship in late 1999. He won the 125cc national title in 2000, making him the youngest to do so at 16 years old. While Pastrana competed in the AMA Supercross Championship 125cc East Coast class in 2000, he fell short in his pursuit of the title. After this, Pastrana moved in with Kevin Windham to train for the upcoming racing season. In their downtime, the two would often teach each other freestyle tricks. The training strategy proved successful for Pastrana, who would secure the 125cc East Coast title in 2001. Pastrana competed in the AMA Supercross Championship's 250cc class from 2001 to 2005, with his best season in 2002, where he ranked 16th. He also won the 125cc Rose Creek Invitational and raced at the 2000 Motocross des Nations.

In 2023, Pastrana was inducted into the AMA Motorcycle Hall of Fame.

==== Team Puerto Rico ====
Robert Pastrana, Travis' father, is of Puerto Rican descent, which made Travis directly eligible to represent Puerto Rico in international competition. The Puerto Rico Motorcycle Association provided him with a license to represent the Territory, which was accepted by the Unión Latinoamericana de Motociclismo, the relevant sanctioning body in Latin America. His debut with the team took place on March 15, 2008. He qualified for the finals by winning the first heat, defeating Erick Vallejo of Mexico. In the finals, he finished third, behind local Costa Rican racer Roberto Castro and Vallejo.

In 2018, Pastrana returned to the Motocross of Nations as part of Team Puerto Rico with teammates Kevin Windham and Ryan Sipes in an effort to raise money and awareness following Hurricane Maria in 2017. All three team members eventually made it to the main event, qualifying via the B-final.

=== Freestyle motocross ===
At 13 years old, Pastrana was already performing stunts during motocross racing. At the age of 14, Pastrana competed in and won the World Freestyle Motocross Championship in Las Vegas, Nevada, beginning a winning streak that lasted to 2003. After his gold medal performance at the 1999 X Games, Pastrana clinched the gold at the inaugural Gravity Games in Rhode Island. Pastrana would ultimately go on to win five gold medals at the Gravity Games during its run from 1999 to 2006.

==== X Games ====
- 1999 – Pastrana won the first-ever MotoX Freestyle event at the X Games, scoring the highest-ever Freestyle run score of 99.00 points.
- 2000 – Pastrana won the MotoX Freestyle gold medal for the second time, and attempted his first-ever backflip on a motorcycle but broke his foot.
- 2001 – Pastrana won his third gold in MotoX Freestyle.
- 2002 – Pastrana was out with an injury. Mike Metzger became the first rider other than Pastrana to win Freestyle.
- 2003 – Pastrana claimed his fourth gold and became the second rider ever to complete a 360 in competition.
- 2004 – Pastrana crashed while trying a 50 ft (15m) 360, sustaining a concussion, but was able to compete the next day and won a silver medal. Nate Adams took the gold becoming the first rider to beat Pastrana. Before this event, he had won a bronze medal in Best Trick, performing a One-Handed 360, a Superman Seat Grab, and an Indian Air Back flip.
- 2005 – Pastrana won his fifth gold medal in Freestyle and also attempted the first-ever Backflip Barspin on a motorcycle, however the bike failed and he resorted to a regular bike and performed a Backflip Saran Wrap to take a silver medal in Best Trick.
- 2006 – Pastrana became the third athlete to win three gold medals at a single X Games event. He won golds in MotoX Best Trick, MotoX Freestyle, and Rally Car Racing. Pastrana also performed the first double backflip in competition, scoring a 98.60, the highest score in the Best Trick competition at X Games.
- 2007 – Pastrana took bronze in Rally after sliding into the other driver's area while inside the Home Depot Center. He was disqualified but retained his medal. He also competed in the first MotoX Racing event at X Games, but did not achieve a medal after two false starts in the heat race and last-chance qualifier.
- 2008 – Pastrana took gold in Rally and competed in the Speed & Style event, but did not place.
- 2009 – Pastrana attempted a rodeo 720 at X Games 15 in the Moto X Best Trick Event. He crashed on his first attempt and withdrew from his second after experiencing blurred vision. He placed 4th for his efforts. He took silver in Rally after being defeated by rookie and former IndyCar/Indy 500 champion Kenny Bräck. On November 8, Pastrana landed the Rodeo 720 originally attempted during the games, named it the TP7, due to the fact that he was 20 degrees short of 720.
- 2010 – Pastrana won Moto X Freestyle, landing another double backflip, the first one done during the Freestyle contest. Pastrana also won Moto X Speed & Style, beating silver medalist Nate Adams. Pastrana had problems with his Rally Car during competition, costing him gold at Rally Car Racing and a chance to compete in the new event, Super Rally.
- 2011 – Pastrana launched "Pastranathon"; which included Best Trick, a race at Lucas Oil Raceway in the NASCAR Nationwide Series, and RallyCross at Staples Center in Los Angeles. However, Pastranathon seemed to be done when, in Best Trick, he attempted the TP7 and failed, landing on his right leg. He broke his foot and ankle, and was taken to a local hospital. The injury forced Pastrana to opt out of the NASCAR race, while his team worked to get Pastrana in the RallyCross event by installing a special hand-controlled device for the steering wheel, for which Pastrana had to relearn to drive the car. Pastrana won a qualifying event, then finished 4th in the final after a crash on the last lap.
- 2012 – Pastrana participated in another RallyCross event. For this, he sent a challenge video to Sébastien Loeb, who was at that time the eight-time-consecutive World Rally Championship champion, asking him to race against him in the event. Loeb not only participated, but his team made a new vehicle specifically for the event. Pastrana's effort ended up only to be in vain when he was forced to retire by an accident caused by Andy Scott in the very first heat of the race. Pastrana could only watch Loeb, who would go on to clinch his first gold medal.
- 2015 – Pastrana made his Stadium Super Trucks debut at X Games Austin 2015. Pastrana finished last in his heat race, and was forced to run the last-chance qualifier, finishing second and advancing to the final race; he finished ninth in the final.

=== Rallying ===
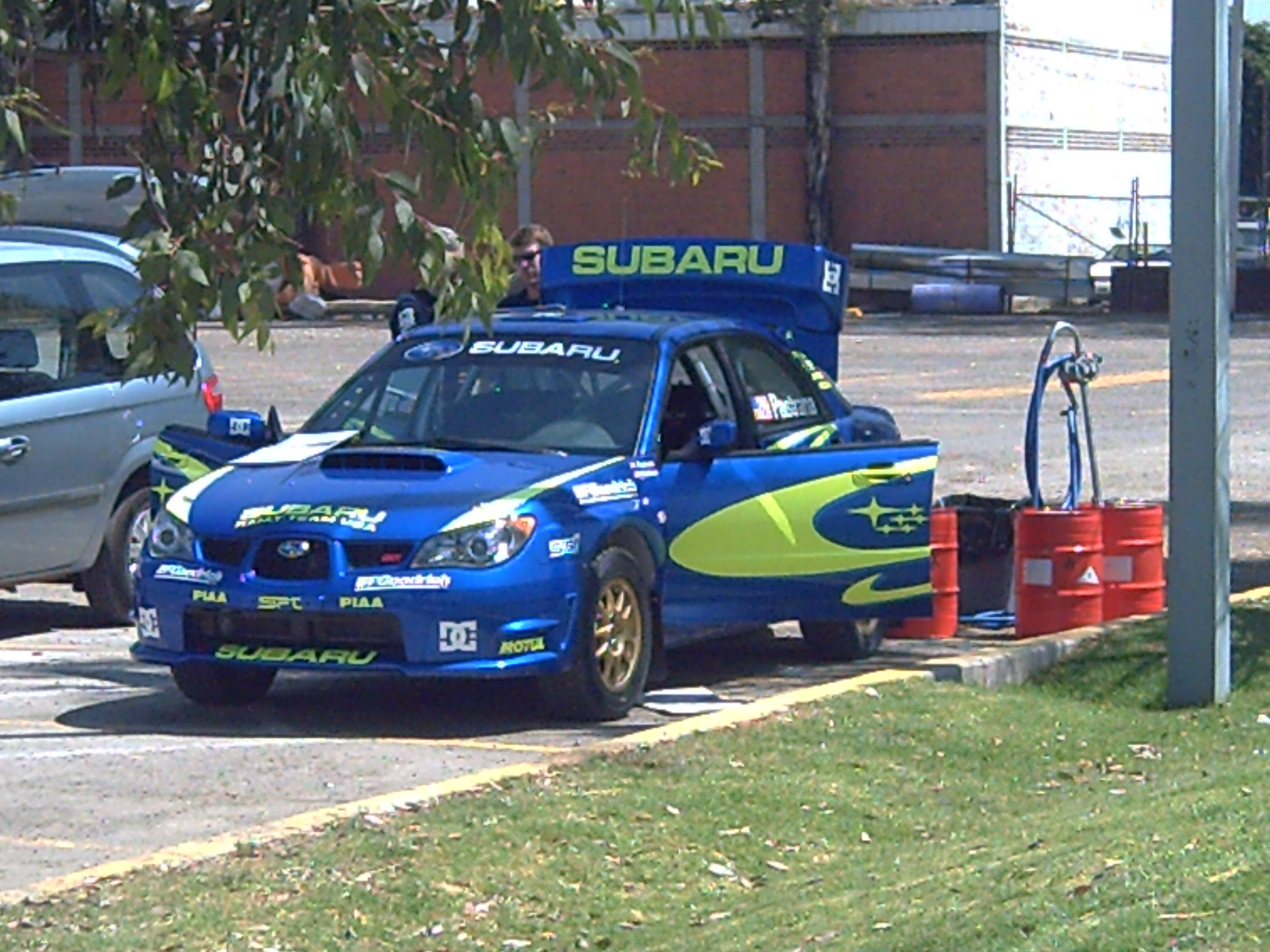
Pastrana's Subaru Impreza WRX STI.

In 2003, Pastrana opened his rallying career at the Race of Champions, and began driving for the Subaru-backed Vermont SportsCar rally team in 2004.

Starting in 2006, Pastrana was signed by Subaru to lead their new Subaru Rally Team USA, paired with veteran co-driver Christian Edstrom. On August 5, 2006, Pastrana won the gold medal in the first rally car competition at the X Games, beating Colin McRae by 0.53 seconds after McRae rolled his car through the last jump. Later that month, Pastrana and Edstrom won their first victory in the Rally America National series at the Ojibwe Forests Rally in Northern Minnesota. The pair would go on to clinch the series overall and open class championship on October 22, 2006, during day one of the Lake Superior Performance Rally, making him the youngest ever American rally champion. That December, Pastrana competed at the 2006 Race of Champions at the Stade de France in Paris. He represented the United States in the Nations' Cup by himself, after injuries forced teammate Jimmie Johnson and his replacement Scott Speed to withdraw.

February 19, 2007, brought news that Pastrana's longtime co-driver Edstrom had announced a sabbatical to concentrate on his career and family. Although former McRae co-driver Derek Ringer competed with Pastrana for the 100 Acre Wood Rally in Salem, Missouri, and Rally America, he did not announce a permanent co-driver.

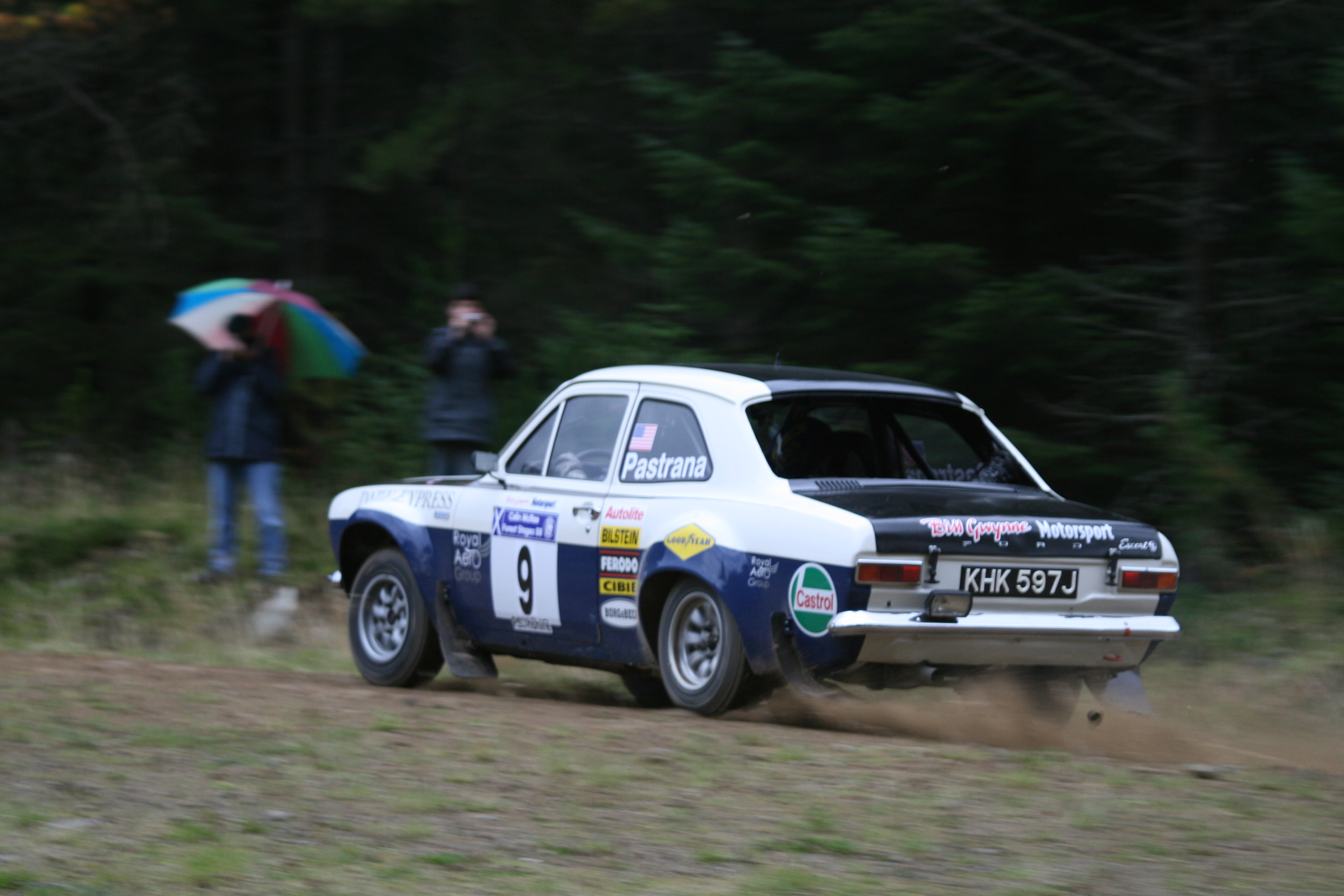
Pastrana driving a classic Ford Escort Mk1 at the 2008 Colin McRae Forest Stages.

In September 2008, Pastrana took part in the Colin McRae Forest Stages Rally, a round of the Scottish Rally Championship centered in Perth in Scotland. Derek Ringer was his co-driver, and they entered the historic Ford Escort RS1600. He was one of a number of celebrity drivers to take part in the event in memory of McRae, who died in 2007.

On August 29, 2009, Pastrana claimed the overall victory at Ojibwe Forests Rally, his fifth of the 2009 Rally America season. The victory sealed his fourth consecutive Rally America driver's title, the most in series history.

In 2011, Pastrana began competing in the Global RallyCross Championship. The next year, he entered a Dodge Dart at five races, but finished only one, with a win at New Hampshire. He also ran part-time with a Dodge Dart in 2013, claiming third-place finish at Las Vegas. Pastrana entered round 2 of the 2018 Americas Rallycross Championship at Austin, finishing fourth.

In 2020, Pastrana announced plans to construct Circuit 199, a multi-purpose racing facility, in Sudlersville, Maryland. However, the project was shelved due to lawsuits filed by local conservation organizations. Later in the year, he created the Nitro Rallycross series as an expansion of the discipline's participation in the Nitro World Games. Ahead of the inaugural season in late 2021, he built a test track on a 150-acre lot that he purchased near his home. He won two races, which helped him become the 2021 champion as he claimed the tiebreaker over Scott Speed.

In 2024, Pastrana bowed out of the Olympus rally to undergo treatment for prior injuries. Later that year, he confirmed his tenth appearance at the upcoming 2025 Race of Champions in Sydney, Australia.

==== International competition ====
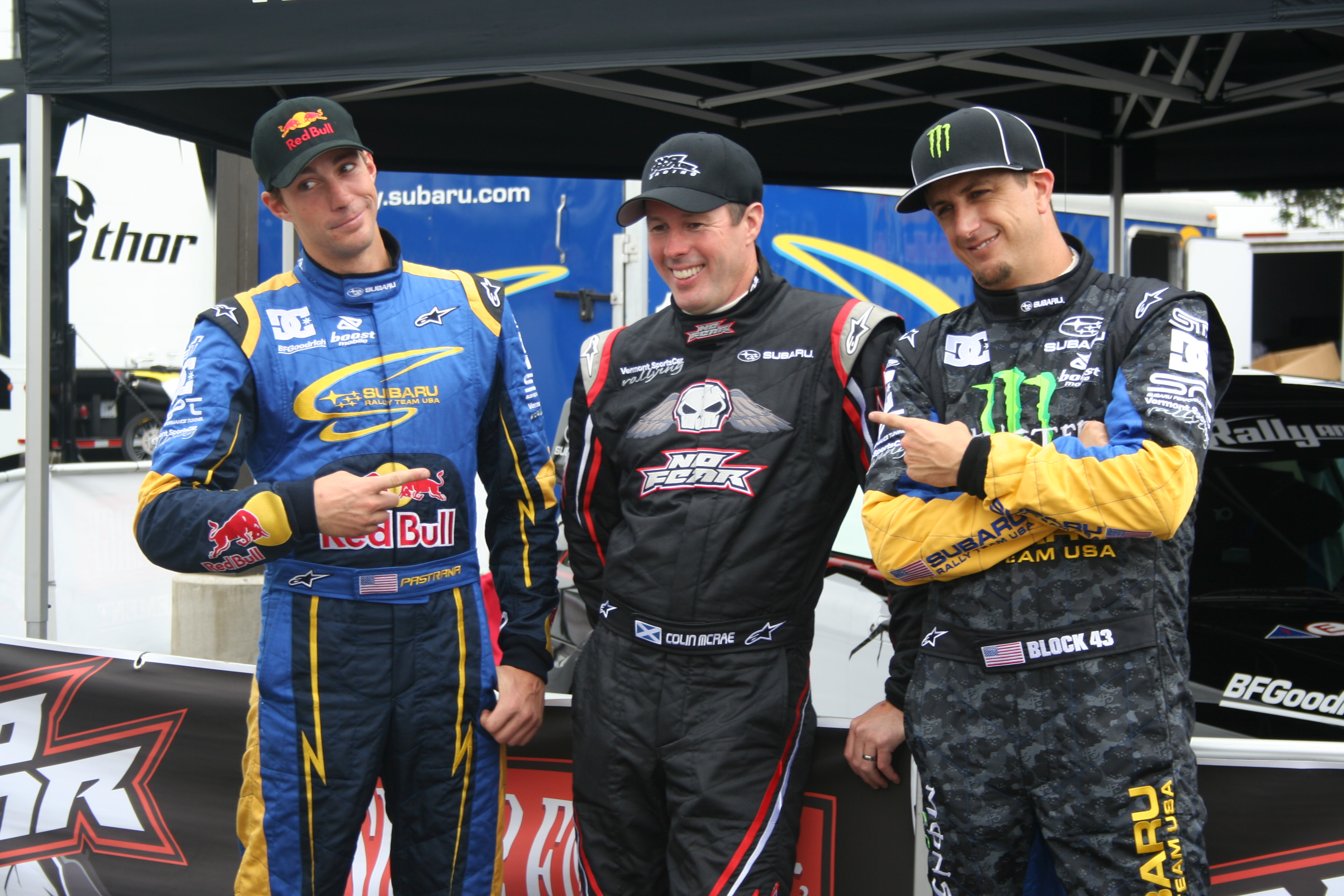
Pastrana, Colin McRae and Ken Block at X Games XIII.

On December 13, 2006, Subaru Rally Team USA announced plans to enter Pastrana in certain World Rally Championship events in 2007, 2008, and 2009.

In the 2007 season, he raced three P-WRC events in the Group N class, driving a Subaru Impreza WRX STI–based rally car. During March 9–11, 2007, Pastrana competed in his first world rally at the 21º Corona Rally México. He finished fifth in the P-WRC (Group N) class (the best in-class finish by an American in a WRC event since John Buffum finished third in the Acropolis Rally in 1988), followed by a tenth place in Rally Argentina and an 11th in Rally GB. Pastrana described his season as having gone "horribly".

Pastrana's 2008 season in the P-WRC was even less successful, with one retirement following a crash on stage one of Rally Argentina and one 13th place on the Acropolis Rally.

=== NASCAR ===
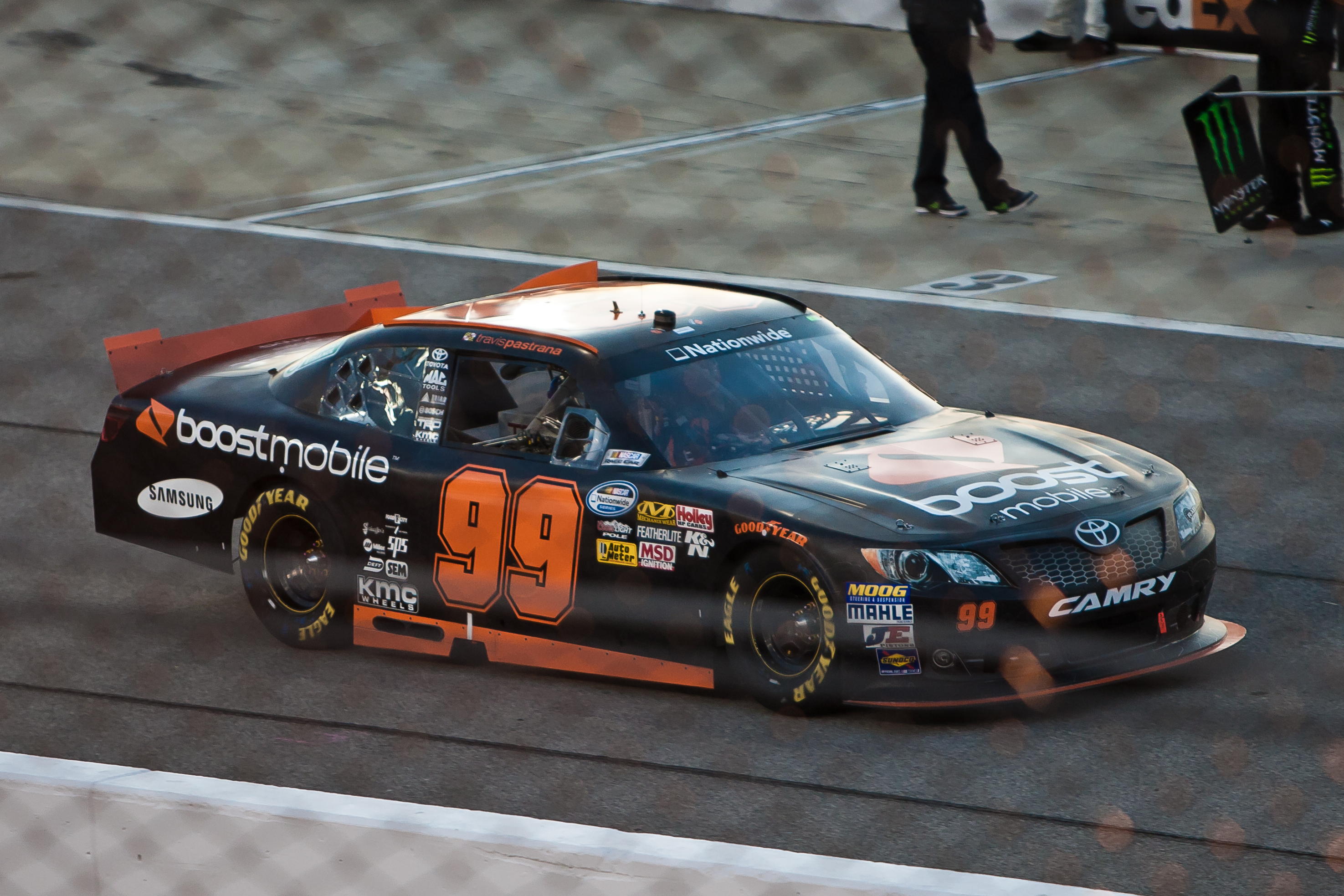
Pastrana's No. 99 at Richmond in April 2012

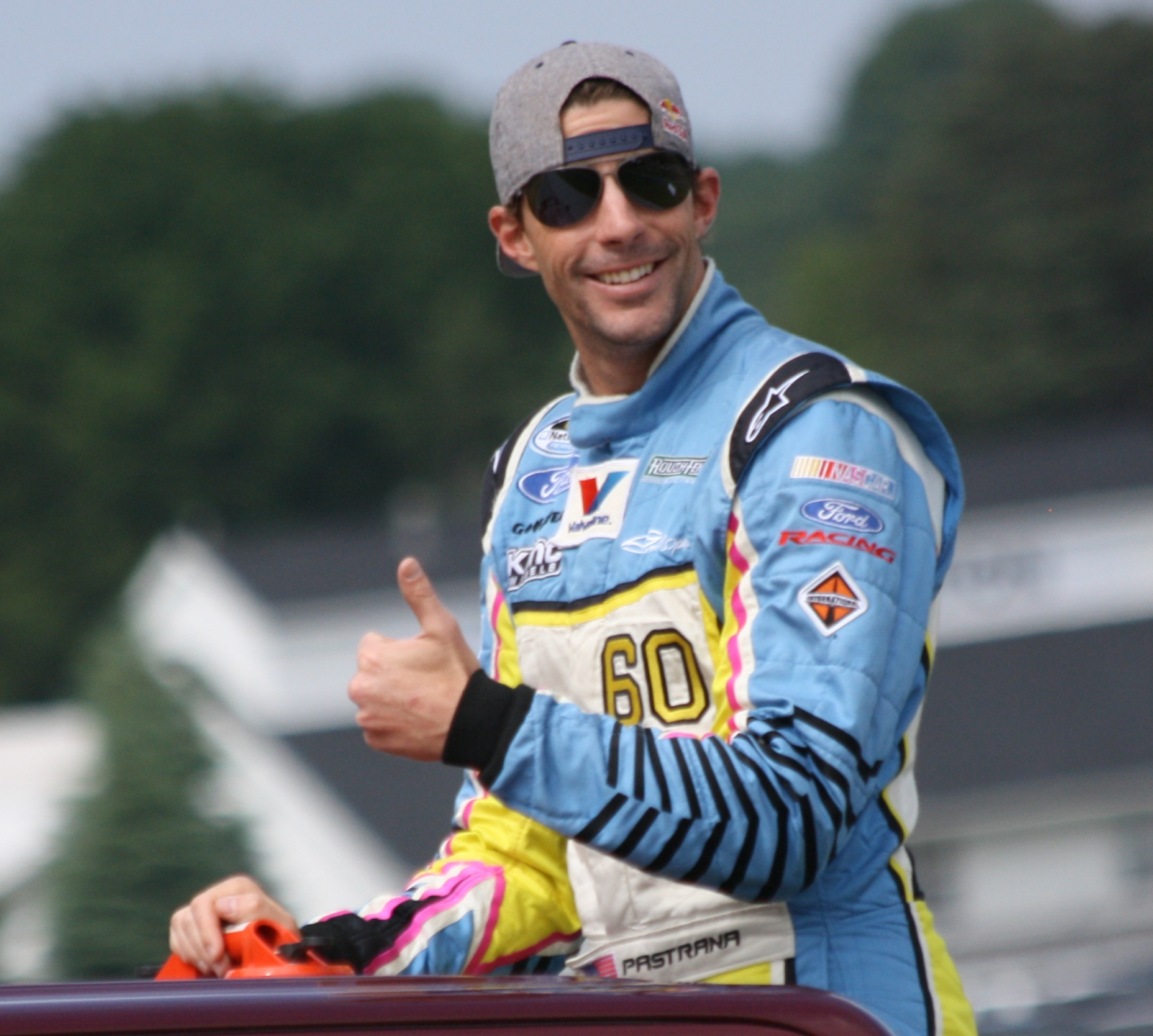
Pastrana during driver intros at Road America in 2013

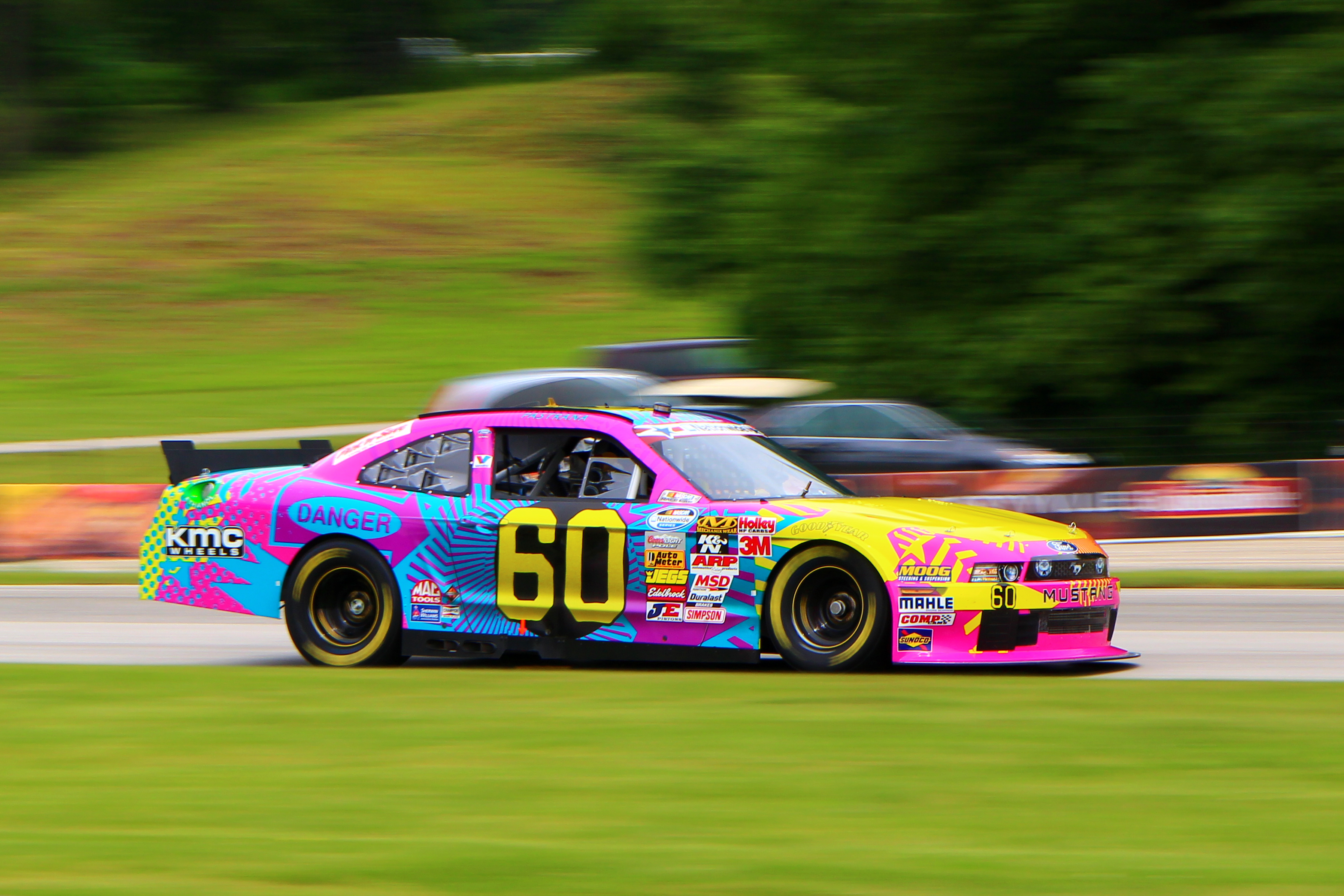
Pastrana's No. 60 at Road America in 2013

Pastrana made his debut in NASCAR competition by driving in the 2011 Toyota All-Star Showdown, finishing sixth. Later in the year, he competed in NASCAR driver Denny Hamlin's Short Track Showdown at Richmond International Raceway, finishing 31st after being involved in a crash on lap two. Pastrana later formed a partnership with Michael Waltrip Racing and Gary and Blake Betchel called Pastrana-Waltrip Racing, and in 2011, ran three K&N Pro Series East starts, with his debut at Richmond in the Blue Ox 100, finishing 33rd. Pastrana's plans to compete in 2011 in the Nationwide Series were cancelled as a result of his injuries at the X-Games in July of that year; as a result, his scheduled race at Indianapolis Raceway Park was officially written off as a withdrawal.

In 2012, Pastrana planned to run a full season in the Pro Series East and select Nationwide Series races. On April 27, 2012, Pastrana made his Nationwide Series debut, finishing 22nd at the Richmond 250. In his first seven races, driving the No. 99 Toyota Camry for RAB Racing in an association with MWR, Pastrana posted a best finish of 13th in the inaugural Indiana 250; at Richmond in September, he drove for NASCAR powerhouse Roush Fenway Racing in the No. 60 Ford Mustang. He also made one start in the Camping World Truck Series that year for ThorSport Racing at Las Vegas Motor Speedway, driving their No. 98 Toyota to a 15th place finish despite a spin early in the race.

In November 2012, Pastrana was revealed to have arranged a full-season ride for 2013 in the Nationwide Series with Roush Fenway Racing. He drove in the team's No. 60 Ford during the 2013 season, posting four top-ten finishes with a best finish of ninth at Richmond International Raceway. The next race, Pastrana won his first career pole position at Talladega Superspeedway, with a lap speed of 176.500 miles per hour (284.049 km/h), but was involved in a late crash. Pastrana ended 2013 with four top tens, a pole and a 14th place points finish, 429 points behind champion Austin Dillon.

On November 11, 2013, Pastrana announced via Facebook that he would be leaving NASCAR at the end of the 2013 season, citing a lack of sponsorship, frustration regarding his performance and a desire to spend time with his family as the reasons for his decision; Pastrana wrote:

"I hate to quit and I hate to fail, but sometimes things work out as they should. I've never been able to figure out the finesse required in pavement racing and that is disappointing, but I'm looking forward to driving more rally and racing more off-road trucks and there will be some announcements on those fronts shortly."

However, Pastrana left open the possibility of running occasional Truck Series events, and expressed a desire to compete in the Daytona 500. On September 23, 2015, Pastrana announced he would make his comeback to NASCAR, signing a one-race deal with NTS Motorsports to race the No. 31 Chevrolet in the Truck Series race at Las Vegas on October 3. After qualifying 17th, Pastrana finished 16th, two laps behind race winner John Wes Townley. He returned to the Truck Series in 2017, driving the No. 45 Chevrolet for Niece Motorsports at Las Vegas.

In 2020, Pastrana returned to NASCAR for the first time in three years, competing for Niece Motorsports again. He drove their No. 40 truck in the second of two races of the doubleheader at Kansas. This was also his first Truck Series start that was not at Las Vegas. On September 17, 2020, it was announced that Pastrana would run the Las Vegas race again with Niece. This was also the first time Pastrana made more than one Truck start in a season.

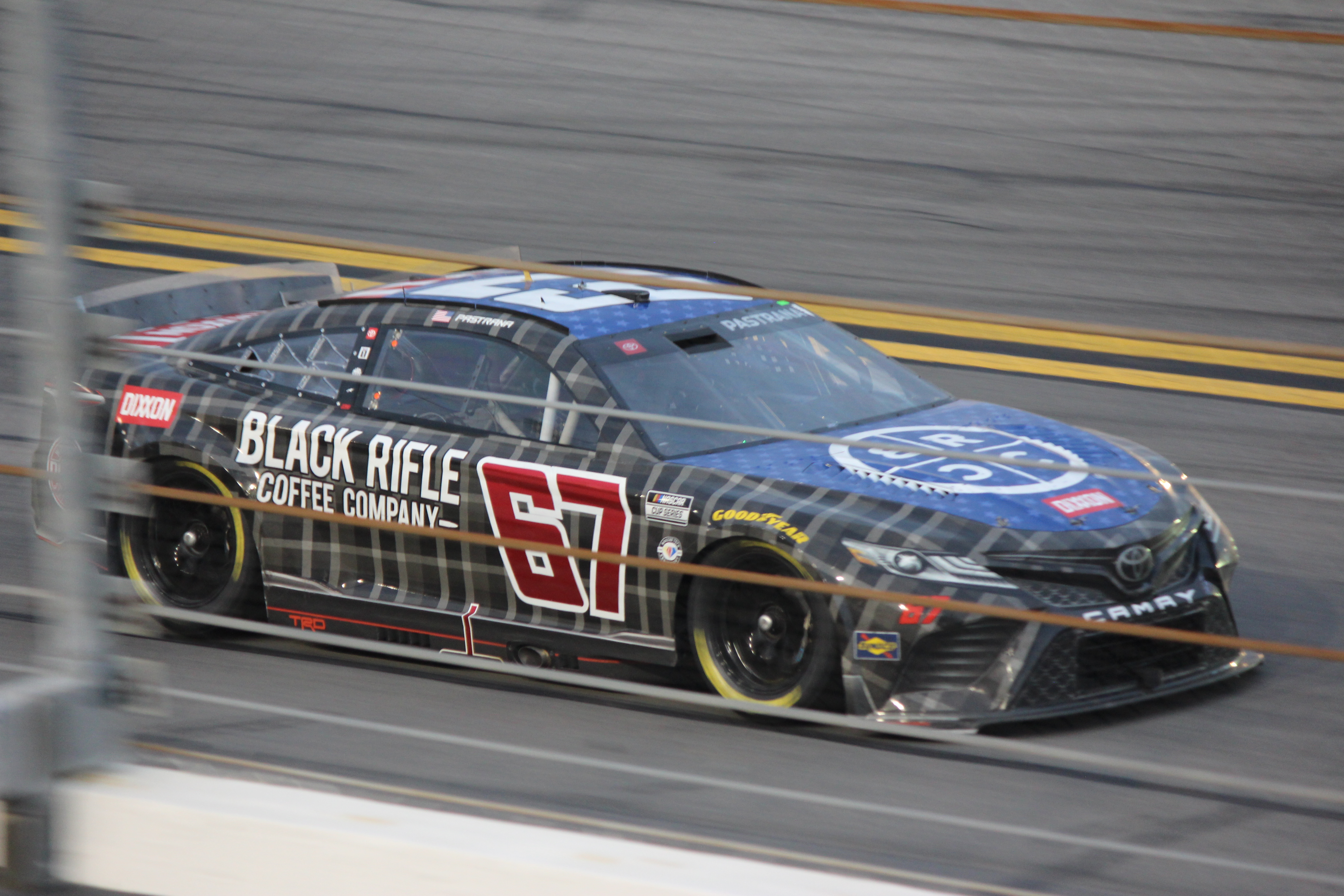
Pastrana at the Daytona 500

On January 13, 2023, NASCAR Cup Series team 23XI Racing tweeted a video teaser announcing that they would field a part-time third car in the 2023 Daytona 500. In it, the driver of it is facing away from the camera and wearing a hat. After a Twitter user found an image of Pastrana wearing the exact same hat, Jordan Bianchi from The Athletic reported that Pastrana would be the driver of the car. On January 17, it was officially announced that Pastrana would attempt to make the Daytona 500 for 23XI Racing, driving the No. 67 Toyota with sponsorship from Black Rifle Coffee Company. On February 14, Pastrana made the entry field by scoring the second fastest lap among the non-chartered teams. During the Daytona 500, Pastrana lead a lap under the first green flag pit cycle by accident. On the final lap, Pastrana was in a position to shoot for a top-five before being turned by Aric Almirola, setting off a multi-car crash that ended the race. Pastrana regrouped and came across the line 11th, completing all 212 laps. After the race, Pastrana was asked about his experience, and he said he accomplished all his goals for the race. Pastrana also said that he would not attempt another NASCAR Cup Series race.

=== Powerboat racing ===
Pastrana expanded his motorsport career into offshore powerboat racing in 2020, joining the Miss GEICO Racing Team to pilot a 47-foot catamaran alongside the British racer Steve Curtis. The driving duties were shared with Brit Lilly, the son to multi-time Offshore World and National Champion Art Lilly. In 2022, he and Curtis secured the Union Internationale Motonautique (UIM) Class 1 World Championship title with the Huski Chocolate Racing Team.

In early 2023, Pastrana announced plans to reduce his offshore racing commitments to focus on family and other racing endeavors, following the deaths of both his team manager, and fellow motorsports athlete Ken Block. Despite this, he continued to participate selectively, including driving for the Pothole Heroes/Alegra Racing team at the Powerboat P1 Sarasota Grand Prix in July 2023, copiloted by John Tomlinson.

=== Other racing ===
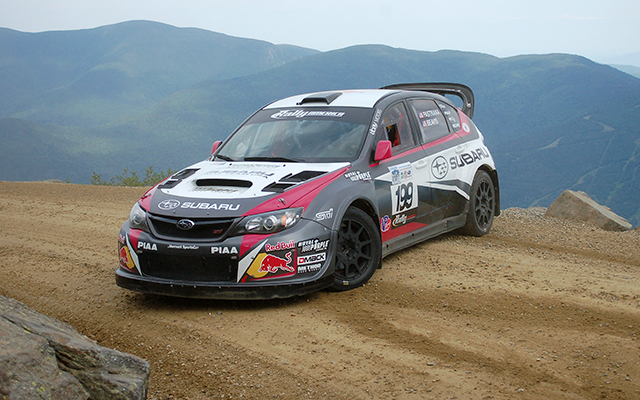
Pastrana at the 2014 Mount Washington Hillclimb

In June 2010, Pastrana entered the Prelude to the Dream charity dirt track race at Eldora Speedway in a No. 199 Subaru. After starting 15th, he finished 23rd.

In September 2010, Pastrana set the world record for fastest ascent of Mount Washington in a car, using his Subaru WRX STi: 6 minutes, 20.47 seconds. In June 2011, David Higgins set a new record for ascent of Mount Washington in a car, at six minutes, 11.54 seconds, using the same model vehicle. Pastrana retook the record in July 2017, driving his Subaru WRX STi up the mountain with a time of five minutes, 44.72 seconds. In August 2021, Pastrana surpassed his July 2017 record by more than 16 seconds with a time of 5 min. 28.67 sec. in his 862 hp "Airslayer" 2020 Subaru WRX STI.

Pastrana competed in the 2012 24 Hours of Daytona for AF Waltrip, with NASCAR driver Michael Waltrip, Michael Waltrip Racing owner Rob Kauffman, and road racing veteran Rui Águas as codrivers. After starting 38th, the team's Ferrari 458 finished 35th overall, 22nd in the GT class.

On October 3, 2014, Pastrana competed in the inaugural Red Bull Straight Rhythm competition, riding in the Open Class on a Suzuki RM-Z 450 with a Honda CR500 engine swap. He dubbed the bike the RM-Zilla. However, Pastrana was eliminated early on in the bracket, and James Stewart Jr. took the overall win.

In February 2024, Legacy Motor Club joined electric off-road racing series Extreme E for the 2024 season with Jimmie Johnson as the lead driver. Pastrana was signed as a substitute for Johnson, who was tied up with 2024 Daytona 500 during the weekend, for the first two rounds of the season to partner Gray Leadbetter. The team finished in sixth in Rounds 1 and 2 at the Desert X-Prix while scoring its first Super Sector in Round 2.

== Nitro Circus ==
In 2009 Nitro Circus, his television show of which he is an executive producer, premiered on MTV. A spinoff of MTV's Jackass, the two shows shared producers, Jeff Tremaine, and were partially created by Jackass frontman Johnny Knoxville. It features Jolene Van Vugt, Erik Roner, Streetbike Tommy, Andy Bell, Jim DeChamp, among others, doing dangerous stunts. Jackass' Johnny Knoxville, Bam Margera, Chris Pontius and Steve-O; BMX freestylers, T. J. Lavin and Mat Hoffman; and actor, Gary Coleman have guest-starred on various episodes. Nitro Circus was also featured in an episode of MTV's Rob Dyrdek's Fantasy Factory and vice versa.

== Other activities ==
Pastrana debuted in Monster Jam on October 16, 2006, driving the "Pastrana 199" monster truck. Mainly on the United States Hot Rod Association (USHRA) circuit, the truck was owned by Live Nation/FELD Motorsports and sponsored by Pastrana. The truck was originally driven by Paul Cohen, then later driven by Chad Tingler, Courtney Jolly, and Cam McQueen. During the 2009 World Finals, the "Pastrana 199" truck changed its name to "Nitro Circus". Pastrana himself competed in the freestyle segment of the event, finishing in a three-way tie for 5th place in a field of 24 trucks. In an episode of Nitro Circus, Pastrana unsuccessfully attempted to backflip the Nitro Circus-themed monster truck. On February 27, 2010, in Jacksonville, Florida, McQueen successfully executed a backflip in the Nitro Circus monster truck during the freestyle competition, making him the first to do so in competition. The truck made its final appearance and was retired after the 2011 Monster Jam season.

On September 26, 2007, Pastrana jumped out of an airplane over Arecibo, Puerto Rico, without a parachute, in a carefully choreographed stunt. He met up in midair with another jumper, then latched himself into a harness to make a safe tandem landing. He "got in a lot of trouble" due to its illegality.

On January 1, 2010, Pastrana officially set a new world record in a ramp-to-ramp car jump. He jumped his Subaru rally car off the Pine Street Pier onto a floating barge anchored in Long Beach's Rainbow Harbor, breaking the existing mark of 171 feet (52 m) and establishing a new world distance record of 269 feet (82 m). To celebrate, after getting out of his car, he performed a gainer from the landing ramp into the harbor below.

=== Evel Knievel tribute jumps ===
Pastrana paid tribute to his role model growing up, legendary daredevil/stuntman Evel Knievel, by breaking a few of his records. On July 8, 2018, in Las Vegas, Nevada, Pastrana safely cleared three record-breaking jumps, which consisted of 52 cars, 16 buses, and a fountain, respectively, for a total of 484 feet (148 m) of jumps in a single night.

The first jump over the cars was at 143 feet (44 m), the second jump over the buses was at 192 feet (59 m), and the third jump over the Caesars Palace Fountain — a jump that Knievel himself was unable to land in 1967, when he crushed his pelvis and his femur — was at 149 feet (45 m), performed with more elevation. These feats were televised live on History.

== Injuries ==
"I don't remember most of the injuries, there have been too many." – Travis Pastrana

Injuries have often taken Pastrana off the circuit for weeks or months at a time. As of 2006, his medical history included: a dislocated spine; torn ACL, PCL, LCL, MCL and meniscus in his left knee; broken tibia and fibula; two surgeries on his left wrist; one on his left thumb; two on his back; one on his right elbow; nine on his left knee; six on his right knee; and one shoulder surgery. According to a 2019 interview, Pastrana has broken more than 90 bones and has suffered more than 25 concussions.

When Pastrana was 14 years old, he was severely injured while competing in a freestyle motocross competition. He came up short on a jump, landing on the top of the front side of the landing ramp and decelerating from 50 mph (80 km/h) to 0 mph (0 km/h) in less than one second. resulting in his spine separating from his pelvis. It also left him in a wheelchair for three months. "I was in and out of consciousness for about three days and had six blood transfusions," said Pastrana. He also added that according to doctors, only three people in the U.S. have ever lived after such an injury. It was a long and difficult recovery, though Pastrana would routinely ride wheelies in his wheelchair around the hospital and therapy areas. While in the wheelchair recovering, he vowed to continue motorcycle jumping.

At the 2005 Race of Champions, he broke his leg while performing at a motocross exhibition but competed in ROC anyway.

In July 2011, he was injured competing at the X Games when his motorcycle did not rotate to the landing position, crushing his ankle and causing a fracture. However, Pastrana was back in his Subaru Impreza and competing in the Rally Cross final where he overshot the corner, forcing himself into the wall; on-board footage shows his leg in plaster being slammed against the wheel well, much to his discomfort.

In 2022, Pastrana was seriously injured when he broke his pelvis base jumping in Fort Lauderdale during filming for an internet series. At the time of the accident, it was reported that he had broken his pelvis "multiple times" in the past. The accident prevented Pastrana from racing for the United States in the 2022 Race of Champions.

== Competition history ==
=== X Games ===
GOLD (11) SILVER (4) BRONZE (2)
Year	X Games	Events	Rank	Medal
1999	Summer X Games V	Moto X Freestyle	1st	Gold medal
2000	Summer X Games VI	Moto X Step Up	8th	
2000	Summer X Games VI	Moto X Freestyle	1st	Gold medal
2001	Summer X Games VII	Moto X Freestyle	1st	Gold medal
2001	Summer X Games VII	Moto X Step Up	2nd	Silver medal
2001	Summer X Games VII	Moto X Big Air	10th	
2003	Summer X Games IX	Moto X Freestyle	1st	Gold medal
2004	Summer X Games X	Moto X Best Trick	3rd	Bronze medal
2004	Summer X Games X	Supermoto	17th	
2004	Summer X Games X	Moto X Freestyle	2nd	Silver medal
2005	Summer X Games XI	Moto X Best Trick	2nd	Silver medal
2005	Summer X Games XI	Moto X Freestyle	1st	Gold medal
2005	Summer X Games XI	Supermoto	8th	
2006	Summer X Games XII	Moto X Best Trick	1st	Gold medal
2006	Summer X Games XII	Rally Car Racing	1st	Gold medal
2006	Summer X Games XII	Supermoto	10th	
2006	Summer X Games XII	Moto X Freestyle	1st	Gold medal
2007	Summer X Games XIII	Moto X Racing		
2007	Summer X Games XIII	Rally Car Racing	3rd	Bronze medal
2008	Summer X Games XIV	Moto X Speed & Style	6th	
2008	Summer X Games XIV	Rally Car Racing	1st	Gold medal
2009	Summer X Games XV	Moto X Best Trick	4th	
2009	Summer X Games XV	Rally Car Racing	2nd	Silver medal
2010	Summer X Games XVI	Moto X Freestyle	1st	Gold medal
2010	Summer X Games XVI	Moto X Speed & Style	1st	Gold medal
2010	Summer X Games XVI	RallyCross		
2011	Summer X Games XVII	Moto X Best Trick	7th	
2011	Summer X Games XVII	RallyCross	4th	
2012	Summer X Games XVIII	RallyCross	16th	
2013	X Games Foz do Iguaçu 2013	RallyCross	7th	
2013	X Games Los Angeles 2013	RallyCross	5th	
2014	X Games Austin 2014	RallyCross	7th	
2015	X Games Austin 2015	RallyCross	13th	

=== Gravity Games ===
Year	GRAVITY GAMES	LOCATION	Events	Rank	Medal
1999	Gravity Games I	Providence, RI	MTX Freestyle	1st	Gold medal
1999	Gravity Games I	Providence, RI	MTX Freestyle Team	1st	Gold medal
2001	Gravity Games III	Providence, RI	MTX Freestyle	1st	Gold medal
2002	Gravity Games IV	Cleveland, OH	MTX Freestyle	1st	Gold medal
2003	Gravity Games V	Cleveland, OH	MTX Freestyle	2nd	Silver medal
2006	Gravity Games VIII	Perth, Western Australia, AUS	MTX Freestyle	1st	Gold medal

=== Rally America results ===
Rally America results
Year	Car	1	2	3	4	5	6	7	8	9	Drivers Championship	Points	Ref
2005	Subaru Impreza WRX STi	Sno*Drift; DNP	Oregon Trail; 2	Susquehannock Trail; 14	Pikes Peak; 6	Maine Forest; DNF	Ojibwe Forests; 3	Colorado Cog; DNF	LSPR; 2		4th	61	
2006	Subaru Impreza WRX STi	Sno*Drift; 2	Rally in the 100 Acre Wood; DNF	Oregon Trail; 2	Susquehannock Trail; 2	Maine Forest; 2	Ojibwe Forests; 1	Colorado Cog; 1	LSPR; 3	Wild West Rally; 1	1st	137	
2007	Subaru Impreza WRX STi	Sno*Drift; 1	Rally in the 100 Acre Wood; 2	Oregon Trail; DNF	Olympus Rally; DNF	Susquehannock Trail; 3	New England Forest Rally; 1	Ojibwe Forests; 1	Rally Colorado; 3	LSPR; 1	1st	130	
2008	Subaru Impreza WRX STi	Sno*Drift; DNF	Rally in the 100 Acre Wood; 2	Olympus Rally; 2	Oregon Trail; 1	Susquehannock Trail; DNF	New England Forest Rally; 3	Ojibwe Forests; 3	Rally Colorado; 1	LSPR; 3	1st	130	
2009	Subaru Impreza WRX STi	Sno*Drift; 1	Rally in the 100 Acre Wood; DNF	Olympus Rally; 1	Oregon Trail; 1	Susquehannock Trail; 2	New England Forest Rally; 1	Ojibwe Forests; 1	Rally Colorado; DNF	LSPR; 1	1st	151	
2010	Subaru Impreza WRX STi	Sno*Drift; 1	Rally in the 100 Acre Wood; DNF	Olympus Rally; 1	Oregon Trail; DNP	Susquehannock Trail; DNP	New England Forest Rally; DNP				3rd	45	

=== Complete WRC results ===
Year	Entrant	Car	1	2	3	4	5	6	7	8	9	10	11	12	13	14	15	16	WDC	Pts
2007	Subaru Rally Team International	Subaru Impreza WRX STi	MON	SWE	NOR	MEX; 15	POR	ARG; 22	ITA	GRE	FIN	GER	NZL	ESP	FRA	JPN	IRE	GBR; 39	NC	0
2008	Subaru Rally Team International	Subaru Impreza WRX STi	MON	SWE	MEX	ARG; Ret	JOR	ITA	GRE; 29	TUR	FIN	GER	NZL	ESP	FRA	JPN	GBR		NC	0

=== Stock car career summary ===
Season	Series	Team	Races	Wins	Top 5	Top 10	Points	Position
2011	NASCAR K&N Pro Series West	Bill McAnally Racing	1	0	0	0	88	87th
2011	NASCAR K&N Pro Series East	Pastrana-Waltrip Racing	3	0	0	0	258	42nd
2012	NASCAR K&N Pro Series East	Pastrana-Waltrip Racing	9	0	1	4	258	17th
2012	NASCAR Camping World Truck Series	ThorSport Racing	1	0	0	0	0	NC†
2012	NASCAR Nationwide Series	RAB Racing	8	0	0	0	204	33rd
2012	NASCAR Nationwide Series	Roush Fenway Racing	1	0	0	0	204	33rd
2013	NASCAR Nationwide Series	Roush Fenway Racing	33	0	0	4	751	14th
2015	NASCAR Camping World Truck Series	NTS Motorsports	1	0	0	0	28	62nd
2017	NASCAR Camping World Truck Series	Niece Motorsports	1	0	0	0	15	67th
2020	NASCAR Gander RV & Outdoors Truck Series	Niece Motorsports	2	0	0	0	31	51st
2023	NASCAR Craftsman Truck Series	Niece Motorsports	1	0	0	0	0	NC†
2023	NASCAR Cup Series	23XI Racing	1	0	0	0	26	37th
2026	NASCAR Craftsman Truck Series	Niece Motorsports	1	0	0	0	38	52nd
2026	NASCAR Craftsman Truck Series	Kaulig Racing	1	0	0	0	38	52nd

^{†} As Pastrana was a guest driver, he was ineligible for championship points.

=== NASCAR ===
(key) (Bold – Pole position awarded by qualifying time. Italics – Pole position earned by points standings or practice time. * – Most laps led.)

==== Cup Series ====
NASCAR Cup Series results
Year	Team	No.	Make	1	2	3	4	5	6	7	8	9	10	11	12	13	14	15	16	17	18	19	20	21	22	23	24	25	26	27	28	29	30	31	32	33	34	35	36	NCSC	Pts	Ref
2023	23XI Racing	67	Toyota	DAY; 11	CAL	LVS	PHO	ATL	COA	RCH	BRD	MAR	TAL	DOV	KAN	DAR	CLT	GTW	SON	NSH	CSC	ATL	NHA	POC	RCH	MCH	IRC	GLN	DAY	DAR	KAN	BRI	TEX	TAL	ROV	LVS	HOM	MAR	PHO	37th	26	

===== Daytona 500 =====
Year	Team	Manufacturer	Start	Finish
2023	23XI Racing	Toyota	40	11

==== Nationwide Series ====
NASCAR Nationwide Series results
Year	Team	No.	Make	1	2	3	4	5	6	7	8	9	10	11	12	13	14	15	16	17	18	19	20	21	22	23	24	25	26	27	28	29	30	31	32	33	NNSC	Pts	Ref
2012	RAB Racing	99	Toyota	DAY	PHO	LVS	BRI	CAL	TEX	RCH; 22	TAL	DAR; 17	IOW; 26	CLT; 24	DOV	MCH	ROA	KEN	DAY	NHA; 31	CHI; 17	IND; 13	IOW	GLN	CGV	BRI	ATL; 26										33rd	204	
2012	Roush Fenway Racing	60	Ford																									RCH; 17	CHI	KEN	DOV	CLT	KAN	TEX	PHO	HOM	33rd	204	
2013	Roush Fenway Racing	60	Ford	DAY; 10	PHO; 28	LVS; 10	BRI; 16	CAL; 13	TEX; 33	RCH; 9	**TAL**; 36	DAR; 28	CLT; 33	DOV; 15	IOW; 32	MCH; 15	ROA; 16	KEN; 15	DAY; 34	NHA; 16	CHI; 18	IND; 10	IOW; 27	GLN; 15	MOH; 31	BRI; 13	ATL; 17	RCH; 20	CHI; 27	KEN; 34	DOV; 22	KAN; 14	CLT; 24	TEX; 31	PHO; 21	HOM; 18	14th	751	

==== Craftsman Truck Series ====
NASCAR Craftsman Truck Series results
Year	Team	No.	Make	1	2	3	4	5	6	7	8	9	10	11	12	13	14	15	16	17	18	19	20	21	22	23	24	25	NCTC	Pts	Ref
2012	ThorSport Racing	98	Toyota	DAY	MAR	CAR	KAN	CLT	DOV	TEX	KEN	IOW	CHI	POC	MCH	BRI	ATL	IOW	KEN	LVS; 15	TAL	MAR	TEX	PHO	HOM				92nd	0^{1}	
2015	NTS Motorsports	31	Chevy	DAY	ATL	MAR	KAN	CLT	DOV	TEX	GTW	IOW	KEN	ELD	POC	MCH	BRI	MSP	CHI	NHA	LVS; 16	TAL	MAR	TEX	PHO	HOM			62nd	28	
2017	Niece Motorsports	45	Chevy	DAY	ATL	MAR	KAN	CLT	DOV	TEX	GTW	IOW	KEN	ELD	POC	MCH	BRI	MSP	CHI	NHA	LVS; 22	TAL	MAR	TEX	PHO	HOM			67th	15	
2020	Niece Motorsports	40	Chevy	DAY	LVS	CLT	ATL	HOM	POC	KEN	TEX	KAN	KAN; 22	MCH	DRC	DOV	GTW	DAR	RCH	BRI									51st	31	
2020	Niece Motorsports	45	Chevy																		LVS; 21	TAL	KAN	TEX	MAR	PHO			51st	31	
2023	Niece Motorsports	41	Chevy	DAY; 13	LVS	ATL	COA	TEX	BRD	MAR	KAN	DAR	NWS	CLT	GTW	NSH	MOH	POC	RCH	IRP	MLW	KAN	BRI	TAL	HOM	PHO			101st	0^{1}	
2026	Niece Motorsports	42	Chevy	DAY; 15	ATL	STP	DAR	CAR	BRI	TEX	GLN	DOV																	52nd	38	
2026	Kaulig Racing	25	Ram										CLT; 22	NSH	MCH	COR	LRP	NWS	IRP	RCH	NHA	BRI	KAN	CLT	PHO	TAL	MAR	HOM	52nd	38	

==== K&N Pro Series East ====
NASCAR K&N Pro Series East results
Year	Team	No.	Make	1	2	3	4	5	6	7	8	9	10	11	12	13	14	NKNPSEC	Pts	Ref
2011	Pastrana-Waltrip Racing	99	Toyota	GRE	SBO	RCH; 33	IOW; 22	BGS	JFC	LGY	NHA; 22	COL	GRE	NHA	DOV			42nd	258	
2012	Pastrana-Waltrip Racing	99	Toyota	BRI; 12	GRE; 20	RCH; 23	IOW; 4	BGS; 14	JFC	LGY; 8	CNB	COL	IOW; 6	NHA; 7	DOV	GRE; 23	CAR	17th	258	

==== K&N Pro Series West ====
NASCAR K&N Pro Series West results
Year	Team	No.	Make	1	2	3	4	5	6	7	8	9	10	11	12	13	14	NKNPSWC	Pts	Ref
2011	Bill McAnally Racing	99	Toyota	PHO; 25	AAS	MMP	IOW	LVS	SON	IRW	EVG	PIR	CNS	MRP	SPO	AAS	PHO	87th	88	

^{*} Season still in progress
^{1} Ineligible for series points

=== Sports car racing ===
==== 24 Hours of Daytona ====
(key) (Races in bold indicate pole position, Results are overall/class)

24 Hours of Daytona results
Year	Class	No	Team	Car	Co-drivers	Laps	Position	Class Pos.
2012	GT	56	(Italy) AF Waltrip	Ferrari 458	(Portugal) Rui Águas (United States) Rob Kauffman (United States) Michael Waltrip	645	35	22

==== Rolex Sports Car Series results ====
Rolex Sports Car Series results
Year	Team	Make	No.	Class	1	2	3	4	5	6	7	8	9	10	11	12	13	Pos	Points
2012	AF Waltrip	Ferrari 458	56	GT	DAY; 35/22	BAR	HOM	NJM	DET	MOH	EKL	GLN	IND	GLN	CGV	LAG	LRP	105th	16

^{*} Season still in progress.
^{1} Ineligible for series championship points.

=== Complete Global RallyCross Championship results ===
==== Supercar ====
Global RallyCross Championship results
Year	Entrant	Car	1	2	3	4	5	6	7	8	9	Position	Points
2011	Subaru Rally Team USA	Subaru Impreza GR WRX STI	IRW1	IRW2	SEA1	SEA2	PIK1	PIK2	LA1	LA2; 4		19th	13
2012	Pastrana Racing	Dodge Dart SRT	CHA; 8	TEX; 15	LA; 16	LOU; 1	LV; 10	LVC				9th	40
2013	Pastrana Racing	Dodge Dart SRT	BRA; 7	MUN1	MUN2	LOU; 7	BRI	IRW; 5	ATL	CHA; 9	LV; 3	10th	56

=== Complete Extreme E results ===
(key)

Year	Team	Car	1	2	3	4	5	6	7	8	9	10	Pos.	Points
2024	Legacy Motor Club	Spark ODYSSEY 21	DES; 1; 6	DES; 2; 6	HYD; 1	HYD; 2	ISL1; 1 C	ISL1; 2 C	ISL2; 1 C	ISL2; 2 C	VAL; 1 C	VAL; 2 C	10th ^{†}	16 ^{†}

^{†} Season abandoned.

== In the media ==
- Pastrana, along with fellow motocross racer Jeremy McGrath, lent his name to the Acclaim-published game Freestyle Motocross: McGrath vs. Pastrana, released in 2000.
- Pastrana and McGrath performed as stunt riders in the 2001 Disney Channel movie Motocrossed.
- Pastrana is featured as a hidden surfer in the 2002 video game Kelly Slater's Pro Surfer.
- Pastrana appears as a playable character in the 2004 video game MTX Mototrax, as well as appearing on the game's box art. The game was originally titled Travis Pastrana's Pro MotoX and MTX: Mototrax featuring Travis Pastrana.
- Pastrana lent his voice to the 2007 game Colin McRae: DiRT as himself, and the in-menu voice. He also features as a driver in 2009's Colin McRae: DiRT 2 for Subaru Rally Team USA.
- Pastrana co-authored a book about his life, The Big Jump: The Tao of Travis Pastrana, with ESPN The Magazine senior writer Alyssa Roenigk, which was published by ESPN Books in 2007.
- A documentary about Pastrana was filmed by ESPN in 2008, titled 199 Lives: The Travis Pastrana Story.
- Pastrana is featured in X Games: The Movie; his work with motocross and rally cars is shown.
- Pastrana alongside Kay Adams served as co-hosts on Impractical Jokers in the Nitro Circus live event at the Prudential Center on November 3, 2016.
- Pastrana served as a judge on the America's Got Talent spin-off AGT: Extreme, which premiered February 21, 2022, on NBC.

== Personal life ==
Pastrana's uncle, Alan Pastrana, played as a quarterback from 1965 to 1968 at the University of Maryland, which Travis Pastrana also attended.

On June 11, 2003, 19-year-old Pastrana was seriously injured when he crashed his Corvette into a tree in Davidsonville, Maryland.

On June 4, 2011, during a live performance of Nitro Circus, he proposed to Lyn-Z Adams Hawkins, a professional skateboarder. On October 29, 2011, Hawkins and Pastrana were married in front of several family and friends in Southern California, near the home of Hawkins. On February 26, 2013, Hawkins and Pastrana announced on their personal Facebook, Instagram, and Twitter pages that they were expecting their first child due in September 2013. Hawkins gave birth to a girl on Labor Day, September 2, 2013. On August 5, 2014, Hawkins announced in her personal page that she and Pastrana were expecting their second child due in February 2015. She gave birth to a girl on February 9, 2015.
