= 199 Lives: The Travis Pastrana Story =

2008 film by Gregg Godfrey

- Directed by: Gregg Godfrey
- Starring: Travis Pastrana
- Edited by: Seth Torok
- Distributed by: Studio 411
- Release date: April 16, 2008
- Country: United States
- Language: English

199 Lives: The Travis Pastrana Story is a 2008 documentary film about the life of off-road racing legend Travis Pastrana by ESPN films.

In fall of 2009, 199 Lives was released on DVD and made available for download via Microsoft's Xbox Live Video Marketplace.
