= 2023 Daytona 500 =

65th Running of the event, held in Daytona Beach, Florida

Race details
- Race 1 of 36 in the 2023 NASCAR Cup Series
- Date: February 19, 2023
- Location: Daytona International Speedway in Daytona Beach, Florida
- Course: Permanent racing facility 2.5 mi (4 km)
- Distance: 212 laps, 530 mi (848 km)
- Scheduled distance: 200 laps, 500 mi (800 km)
- Average speed: 145.283 miles per hour (233.810 km/h)

Pole position
Driver	Alex Bowman	Hendrick Motorsports
- Time: 49.536

Qualifying race winners
Duel 1 Winner	Joey Logano	Team Penske
Duel 2 Winner	Aric Almirola	Stewart-Haas Racing

Most laps led
Driver	Brad Keselowski	RFK Racing
- Laps: 42

Winner
No. 47	Ricky Stenhouse Jr.	JTG Daugherty Racing

Television in the United States
- Network: Fox
- Announcers: Mike Joy, Clint Bowyer, and Tony Stewart
- Nielsen ratings: 8.173 million

Radio in the United States
- Radio: MRN
- Booth announcers: Alex Hayden, Jeff Striegle, and Rusty Wallace
- Turn announcers: Dave Moody (1 & 2), Mike Bagley (Backstretch), and Kyle Rickey (3 & 4)

The 2023 Daytona 500 was a NASCAR Cup Series race and the 65th running of the event. It was held on Sunday, February 19, 2023, at Daytona International Speedway in Daytona Beach, Florida. It was the first race of the 2023 NASCAR Cup Series. Jimmie Johnson returned to the Cup Series for Legacy Motor Club in this race. This was the longest Daytona 500 in history going 530 miles.

Ricky Stenhouse Jr., driving for JTG Daugherty Racing, won his first Daytona 500 and third career race after edging out two-time series champion Joey Logano for the lead in front of a multi-car accident on the final lap.

== Report ==
Daytona International Speedway is a race track in Daytona Beach, Florida that is one of six superspeedways, the others being Auto Club Speedway, Pocono Raceway, Indianapolis Motor Speedway, Michigan International Speedway, and Talladega Superspeedway.

=== Background ===
Daytona International Speedway is one of three superspeedways to hold NASCAR races, the other two being Atlanta Motor Speedway and Talladega Superspeedway. The standard track at Daytona International Speedway is a four-turn superspeedway that is 2.5 miles (4.0 km) long. The track's turns are banked at 31 degrees, while the front stretch, the location of the finish line, is banked at 18 degrees.

==== Entry list ====
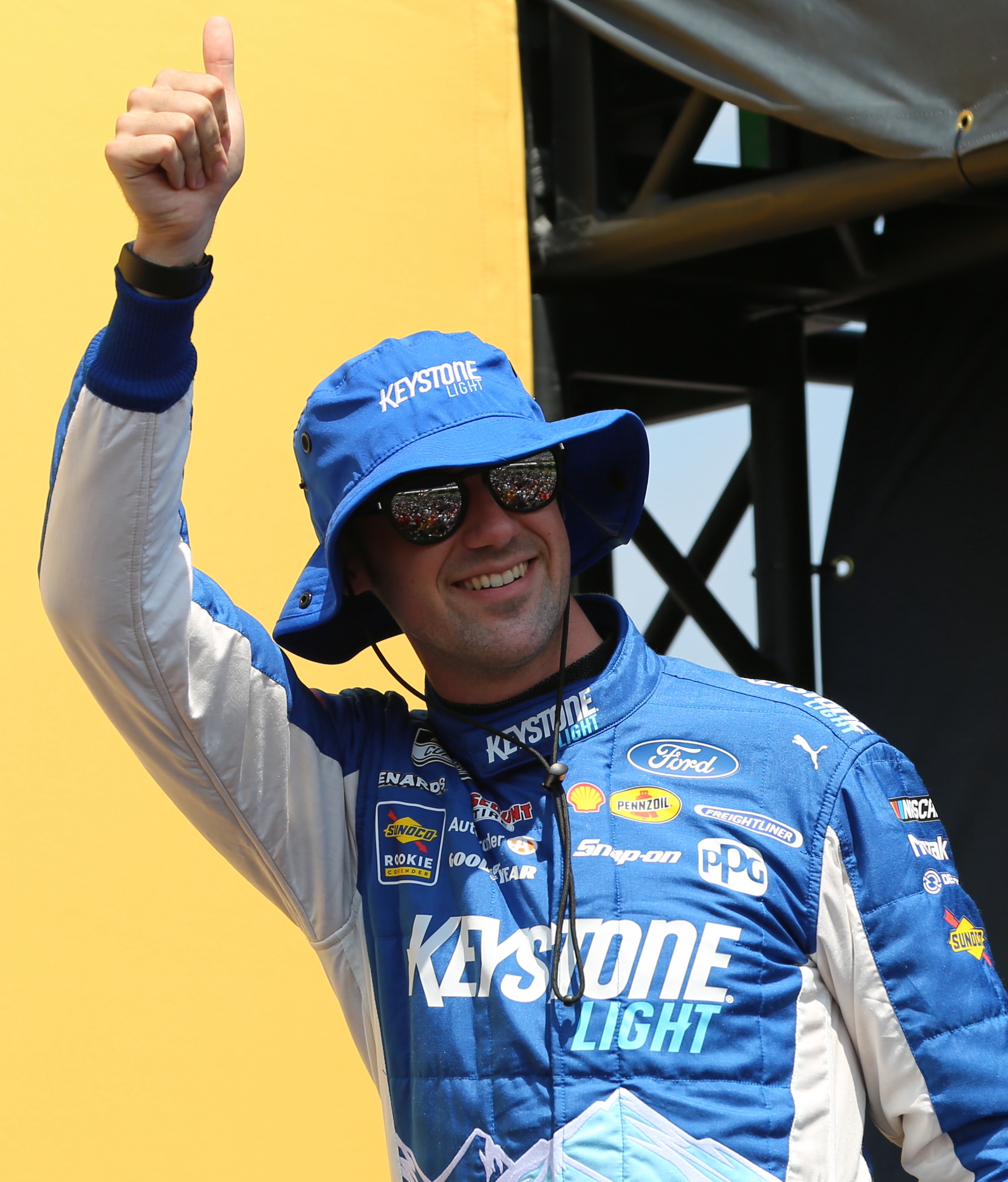
Defending race winner Austin Cindric.

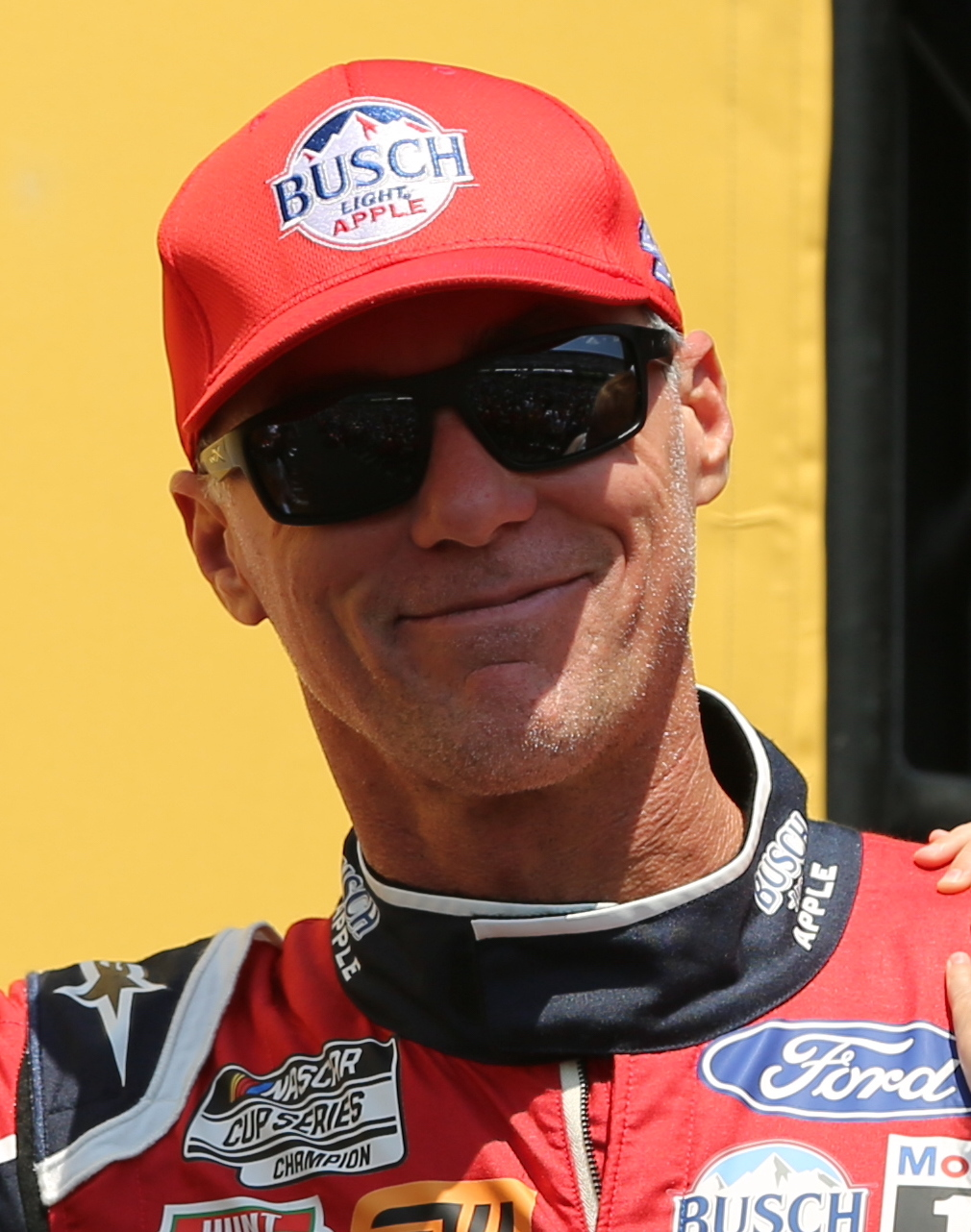
2007 race winner Kevin Harvick had the most prior starts of the field at 21.

- (R) denotes rookie driver.
- (W) denotes former winner.
- (i) denotes driver who is ineligible for series driver points.

No.	Driver	Team	Manufacturer
1	Ross Chastain	Trackhouse Racing	Chevrolet
2	Austin Cindric (W)	Team Penske	Ford
3	Austin Dillon (W)	Richard Childress Racing	Chevrolet
4	Kevin Harvick (W)	Stewart-Haas Racing	Ford
5	Kyle Larson	Hendrick Motorsports	Chevrolet
6	Brad Keselowski	RFK Racing	Ford
7	Corey LaJoie	Spire Motorsports	Chevrolet
8	Kyle Busch	Richard Childress Racing	Chevrolet
9	Chase Elliott	Hendrick Motorsports	Chevrolet
10	Aric Almirola	Stewart-Haas Racing	Ford
11	Denny Hamlin (W)	Joe Gibbs Racing	Toyota
12	Ryan Blaney	Team Penske	Ford
13	Chandler Smith (i)	Kaulig Racing	Chevrolet
14	Chase Briscoe	Stewart-Haas Racing	Ford
15	Riley Herbst (i)	Rick Ware Racing	Ford
16	A. J. Allmendinger	Kaulig Racing	Chevrolet
17	Chris Buescher	RFK Racing	Ford
19	Martin Truex Jr.	Joe Gibbs Racing	Toyota
20	Christopher Bell	Joe Gibbs Racing	Toyota
21	Harrison Burton	Wood Brothers Racing	Ford
22	Joey Logano (W)	Team Penske	Ford
23	Bubba Wallace	23XI Racing	Toyota
24	William Byron	Hendrick Motorsports	Chevrolet
31	Justin Haley	Kaulig Racing	Chevrolet
34	Michael McDowell (W)	Front Row Motorsports	Ford
36	Zane Smith (i)	Front Row Motorsports	Ford
38	Todd Gilliland	Front Row Motorsports	Ford
41	Ryan Preece	Stewart-Haas Racing	Ford
42	Noah Gragson (R)	Legacy Motor Club	Chevrolet
43	Erik Jones	Legacy Motor Club	Chevrolet
45	Tyler Reddick	23XI Racing	Toyota
47	Ricky Stenhouse Jr.	JTG Daugherty Racing	Chevrolet
48	Alex Bowman	Hendrick Motorsports	Chevrolet
50	Conor Daly (i)	The Money Team Racing	Chevrolet
51	Cody Ware	Rick Ware Racing	Ford
54	Ty Gibbs (R)	Joe Gibbs Racing	Toyota
62	Austin Hill (i)	Beard Motorsports	Chevrolet
67	Travis Pastrana	23XI Racing	Toyota
77	Ty Dillon	Spire Motorsports	Chevrolet
78	B. J. McLeod	Live Fast Motorsports	Chevrolet
84	Jimmie Johnson (W)	Legacy Motor Club	Chevrolet
99	Daniel Suárez	Trackhouse Racing	Chevrolet
Official entry list

== Qualifying ==
Alex Bowman scored the pole for the race with a time of 49.536 and a speed of 181.686 mph (292.395 km/h). Kyle Larson earned the outside pole.

Only the top two cars qualify from time trials. The Duels set the lineup for positions 3–38. The first race sets the lineup for cars that qualified in odd-numbered positions on pole qualifying day, while the second race sets the lineup for cars that qualified in even-numbered positions. Only one Open team in each Duel will qualify in this manner. Grid positions 39 and 40 are filled by the two "Open" (teams without a charter) cars that set the fastest times in qualifying, but did not lock in a spot in the Duels.

The fastest two Open team qualifiers were Jimmie Johnson and Travis Pastrana which earned them a spot in the race regardless of the outcome of the Duels.

=== Qualifying results ===
Pos	No.	Driver	Team	Manufacturer	R1	R2
1	48	Alex Bowman	Hendrick Motorsports	Chevrolet	49.717	49.536
2	5	Kyle Larson	Hendrick Motorsports	Chevrolet	49.870	49.708
3	24	William Byron	Hendrick Motorsports	Chevrolet	49.926	49.799
4	10	Aric Almirola	Stewart-Haas Racing	Ford	49.903	49.800
5	22	Joey Logano	Team Penske	Ford	49.881	49.803
6	14	Chase Briscoe	Stewart-Haas Racing	Ford	49.869	49.817
7	12	Ryan Blaney	Team Penske	Ford	49.965	49.985
8	2	Austin Cindric	Team Penske	Ford	49.927	49.996
9	21	Harrison Burton	Wood Brothers Racing	Ford	49.996	50.070
10	8	Kyle Busch	Richard Childress Racing	Chevrolet	49.920	0.000 (Note: Kyle Busch's Round 2 time was disallowed after he went below the yellow line during his qualifying run.)
11	23	Bubba Wallace	23XI Racing	Toyota	49.997	—
12	99	Daniel Suárez	Trackhouse Racing	Chevrolet	50.022	—
13	17	Chris Buescher	RFK Racing	Ford	50.031	—
14	9	Chase Elliott	Hendrick Motorsports	Chevrolet	50.033	—
15	1	Ross Chastain	Trackhouse Racing	Chevrolet	50.038	—
16	41	Ryan Preece	Stewart-Haas Racing	Ford	50.042	—
17	4	Kevin Harvick	Stewart-Haas Racing	Ford	50.088	—
18	6	Brad Keselowski	RFK Racing	Ford	50.091	—
19	54	Ty Gibbs (R)	Joe Gibbs Racing	Toyota	50.107	—
20	45	Tyler Reddick	23XI Racing	Toyota	50.108	—
21	20	Christopher Bell	Joe Gibbs Racing	Toyota	50.140	—
22	19	Martin Truex Jr.	Joe Gibbs Racing	Toyota	50.182	—
23	84	Jimmie Johnson	Legacy Motor Club	Chevrolet	50.202	—
24	34	Michael McDowell	Front Row Motorsports	Ford	50.205	—
25	67	Travis Pastrana	23XI Racing	Toyota	50.208	—
26	11	Denny Hamlin	Joe Gibbs Racing	Toyota	50.236	—
27	43	Erik Jones	Legacy Motor Club	Chevrolet	50.280	—
28	42	Noah Gragson (R)	Legacy Motor Club	Chevrolet	50.296	—
29	36	Zane Smith (i)	Front Row Motorsports	Ford	50.318	—
30	16	A. J. Allmendinger	Kaulig Racing	Chevrolet	50.332	—
31	31	Justin Haley	Kaulig Racing	Chevrolet	50.346	—
32	62	Austin Hill (i)	Beard Motorsports	Chevrolet	50.375	—
33	3	Austin Dillon	Richard Childress Racing	Chevrolet	50.473	—
34	38	Todd Gilliland	Front Row Motorsports	Ford	50.504	—
35	47	Ricky Stenhouse Jr.	JTG Daugherty Racing	Chevrolet	50.583	—
36	78	B. J. McLeod	Live Fast Motorsports	Chevrolet	50.609	—
37	51	Cody Ware	Rick Ware Racing	Ford	50.799	—
38	15	Riley Herbst (i)	Rick Ware Racing	Ford	50.891	—
39	77	Ty Dillon	Spire Motorsports	Chevrolet	51.045	—
40	7	Corey LaJoie	Spire Motorsports	Chevrolet	51.053	—
41	13	Chandler Smith (i)	Kaulig Racing	Chevrolet	51.422	—
42	50	Conor Daly (i)	The Money Team Racing	Chevrolet	0.000	—
Official qualifying results

== Bluegreen Vacations Duel ==
The Bluegreen Vacations Duels are a pair of NASCAR Cup Series races held in conjunction with the Daytona 500 annually in February at Daytona International Speedway. They consist of two races 60 laps and 150 miles (240 km) in length, which serve as heat races that set the lineup for the Daytona 500. Both races sets the lineup for positions 3–38. The first race sets the lineup for cars that qualified in odd–numbered positions on pole qualifying day with exceptions based on open teams. The second race sets the lineup for cars that qualified in even–numbered positions. Only the top finishing open car will transfer from each qualifying race. After qualifying races, the final two positions are determined by fastest times in qualifying of open teams that did not advance.

=== Duel 1 ===
==== Duel 1 results ====
Pos	Grid	No	Driver	Team	Manufacturer	Laps	Points
1	3	22	Joey Logano	Team Penske	Ford	60	10
2	11	20	Christopher Bell	Joe Gibbs Racing	Toyota	60	9
3	4	12	Ryan Blaney	Team Penske	Ford	60	8
4	7	17	Chris Buescher	RFK Racing	Ford	60	7
5	13	34	Michael McDowell	Front Row Motorsports	Ford	60	6
6	9	4	Kevin Harvick	Stewart-Haas Racing	Ford	60	5
7	6	23	Bubba Wallace	23XI Racing	Toyota	60	4
8	15	36	Zane Smith (i)	Front Row Motorsports	Ford	60	3
9	5	21	Harrison Burton	Wood Brothers Racing	Ford	60	2
10	2	24	William Byron	Hendrick Motorsports	Chevrolet	60	1
11	8	1	Ross Chastain	Trackhouse Racing	Chevrolet	60	0
12	14	43	Erik Jones	Legacy Motor Club	Chevrolet	60	0
13	17	3	Austin Dillon	Richard Childress Racing	Chevrolet	60	0
14	12	84	Jimmie Johnson	Legacy Motor Club	Chevrolet	60	0
15	16	16	A. J. Allmendinger	Kaulig Racing	Chevrolet	60	0
16	18	47	Ricky Stenhouse Jr.	JTG Daugherty Racing	Chevrolet	59	0
17	1	48	Alex Bowman	Hendrick Motorsports	Chevrolet	59	0
18	21	13	Chandler Smith (i)	Kaulig Racing	Chevrolet	59	0
19	10	54	Ty Gibbs (R)	Joe Gibbs Racing	Toyota	59	0
20	19	51	Cody Ware	Rick Ware Racing	Ford	59	0
21	20	77	Ty Dillon	Spire Motorsports	Chevrolet	59	0
Official race results

=== Duel 2 ===
==== Duel 2 results ====
Pos	Grid	No	Driver	Team	Manufacturer	Laps	Points
1	2	10	Aric Almirola	Stewart-Haas Racing	Ford	60	10
2	4	2	Austin Cindric	Team Penske	Ford	60	9
3	7	9	Chase Elliott	Hendrick Motorsports	Chevrolet	60	8
4	9	6	Brad Keselowski	RFK Racing	Ford	60	7
5	20	7	Corey LaJoie	Spire Motorsports	Chevrolet	60	6
6	1	5	Kyle Larson	Hendrick Motorsports	Chevrolet	60	5
7	17	38	Todd Gilliland	Front Row Motorsports	Ford	60	4
8	11	19	Martin Truex Jr.	Joe Gibbs Racing	Toyota	60	3
9	13	11	Denny Hamlin	Joe Gibbs Racing	Toyota	60	2
10	8	41	Ryan Preece	Stewart-Haas Racing	Ford	60	1
11	14	42	Noah Gragson (R)	Legacy Motor Club	Chevrolet	60	0
12	6	99	Daniel Suárez	Trackhouse Racing	Chevrolet	60	0
13	10	45	Tyler Reddick	23XI Racing	Toyota	60	0
14	15	31	Justin Haley	Kaulig Racing	Chevrolet	60	0
15	3	14	Chase Briscoe	Stewart-Haas Racing	Ford	60	0
16	18	78	B. J. McLeod	Live Fast Motorsports	Chevrolet	60	0
17	21	50	Conor Daly (i)	The Money Team Racing	Chevrolet	59	0
18	16	62	Austin Hill (i)	Beard Motorsports	Chevrolet	41	0
19	5	8	Kyle Busch	Richard Childress Racing	Chevrolet	40	0
20	19	15	Riley Herbst (i)	Rick Ware Racing	Ford	40	0
21	12	67	Travis Pastrana	23XI Racing	Toyota	40	0
Official race results

=== Starting lineup ===
Pos	No.	Driver	Team	Manufacturer	Notes
1	48	Alex Bowman	Hendrick Motorsports	Chevrolet	Fastest in pole qualifying
2	5	Kyle Larson	Hendrick Motorsports	Chevrolet	Second in pole qualifying
3	22	Joey Logano	Team Penske	Ford	Duel 1 Winner
4	10	Aric Almirola	Stewart-Haas Racing	Ford	Duel 2 Winner
5	20	Christopher Bell	Joe Gibbs Racing	Toyota	Second in Duel 1
6	2	Austin Cindric	Team Penske	Ford	Second in Duel 2
7	12	Ryan Blaney	Team Penske	Ford	Third in Duel 1
8	9	Chase Elliott	Hendrick Motorsports	Chevrolet	Third in Duel 2
9	17	Chris Buescher	RFK Racing	Ford	Fourth in Duel 1
10	6	Brad Keselowski	RFK Racing	Ford	Fourth in Duel 2
11	34	Michael McDowell	Front Row Motorsports	Ford	Fifth in Duel 1
12	7	Corey LaJoie	Spire Motorsports	Chevrolet	Fifth in Duel 2
13	4	Kevin Harvick	Stewart-Haas Racing	Ford	Sixth in Duel 1
14	38	Todd Gilliland	Front Row Motorsports	Ford	Seventh in Duel 2
15	23	Bubba Wallace	23XI Racing	Toyota	Seventh in Duel 1
16	19	Martin Truex Jr.	Joe Gibbs Racing	Toyota	Eighth in Duel 2
17	36	Zane Smith (i)	Front Row Motorsports	Ford	Eighth in Duel 1
18	11	Denny Hamlin	Joe Gibbs Racing	Toyota	Ninth in Duel 2
19	21	Harrison Burton	Wood Brothers Racing	Ford	Ninth in Duel 1
20	41	Ryan Preece	Stewart-Haas Racing	Ford	Tenth in Duel 2
21	24	William Byron	Hendrick Motorsports	Chevrolet	Tenth in Duel 1
22	42	Noah Gragson (R)	Legacy Motor Club	Chevrolet	Eleventh in Duel 2
23	1	Ross Chastain	Trackhouse Racing	Chevrolet	Eleventh in Duel 1
24	99	Daniel Suárez	Trackhouse Racing	Chevrolet	Twelfth in Duel 2
25	43	Erik Jones	Legacy Motor Club	Chevrolet	Twelfth in Duel 1
26	45	Tyler Reddick	23XI Racing	Toyota	Thirteenth in Duel 2
27	3	Austin Dillon	Richard Childress Racing	Chevrolet	Thirteenth in Duel 1
28	31	Justin Haley	Kaulig Racing	Chevrolet	Fourteenth in Duel 2
29	16	A. J. Allmendinger	Kaulig Racing	Chevrolet	Fifteenth in Duel 1
30	14	Chase Briscoe	Stewart-Haas Racing	Ford	Fifteenth in Duel 2
31	47	Ricky Stenhouse Jr.	JTG Daugherty Racing	Chevrolet	Sixteenth in Duel 1
32	78	B. J. McLeod	Live Fast Motorsports	Chevrolet	Sixteenth in Duel 2
33	54	Ty Gibbs (R)	Joe Gibbs Racing	Toyota	Nineteenth in Duel 1
34	50	Conor Daly (i)	The Money Team Racing	Chevrolet	Seventeenth in Duel 2
35	51	Cody Ware	Rick Ware Racing	Ford	20th in Duel 1
36	8	Kyle Busch	Richard Childress Racing	Chevrolet	Nineteenth in Duel 2
37	77	Ty Dillon	Spire Motorsports	Chevrolet	21st in Duel 1
38	15	Riley Herbst (i)	Rick Ware Racing	Ford	20th in Duel 2
39	84	Jimmie Johnson	Legacy Motor Club	Chevrolet	Qualifying Speed
40	67	Travis Pastrana	23XI Racing	Toyota	Qualifying Speed
Did not qualify
41	62	Austin Hill (i)	Beard Motorsports	Chevrolet	
42	13	Chandler Smith (i)	Kaulig Racing	Chevrolet	
Official starting lineup

== Practice ==
=== First practice ===
Jimmie Johnson was the fastest in the first practice session with a time of 46.338 seconds and a speed of 194.225 mph (312.575 km/h).

Pos	No.	Driver	Team	Manufacturer	Time	Speed
1	84	Jimmie Johnson	Legacy Motor Club	Chevrolet	46.338	194.225
2	9	Chase Elliott	Hendrick Motorsports	Chevrolet	46.345	194.196
3	47	Ricky Stenhouse Jr.	JTG Daugherty Racing	Chevrolet	46.348	194.183
Official first practice results

=== Final practice ===
Brad Keselowski was the fastest in the final practice session with a time of 47.071 seconds and a speed of 191.201 mph (307.708 km/h).

Pos	No.	Driver	Team	Manufacturer	Time	Speed
1	6	Brad Keselowski	RFK Racing	Ford	47.071	191.201
2	22	Joey Logano	Team Penske	Ford	47.072	191.196
3	12	Ryan Blaney	Team Penske	Ford	47.076	191.180
Official final practice results

== Race ==
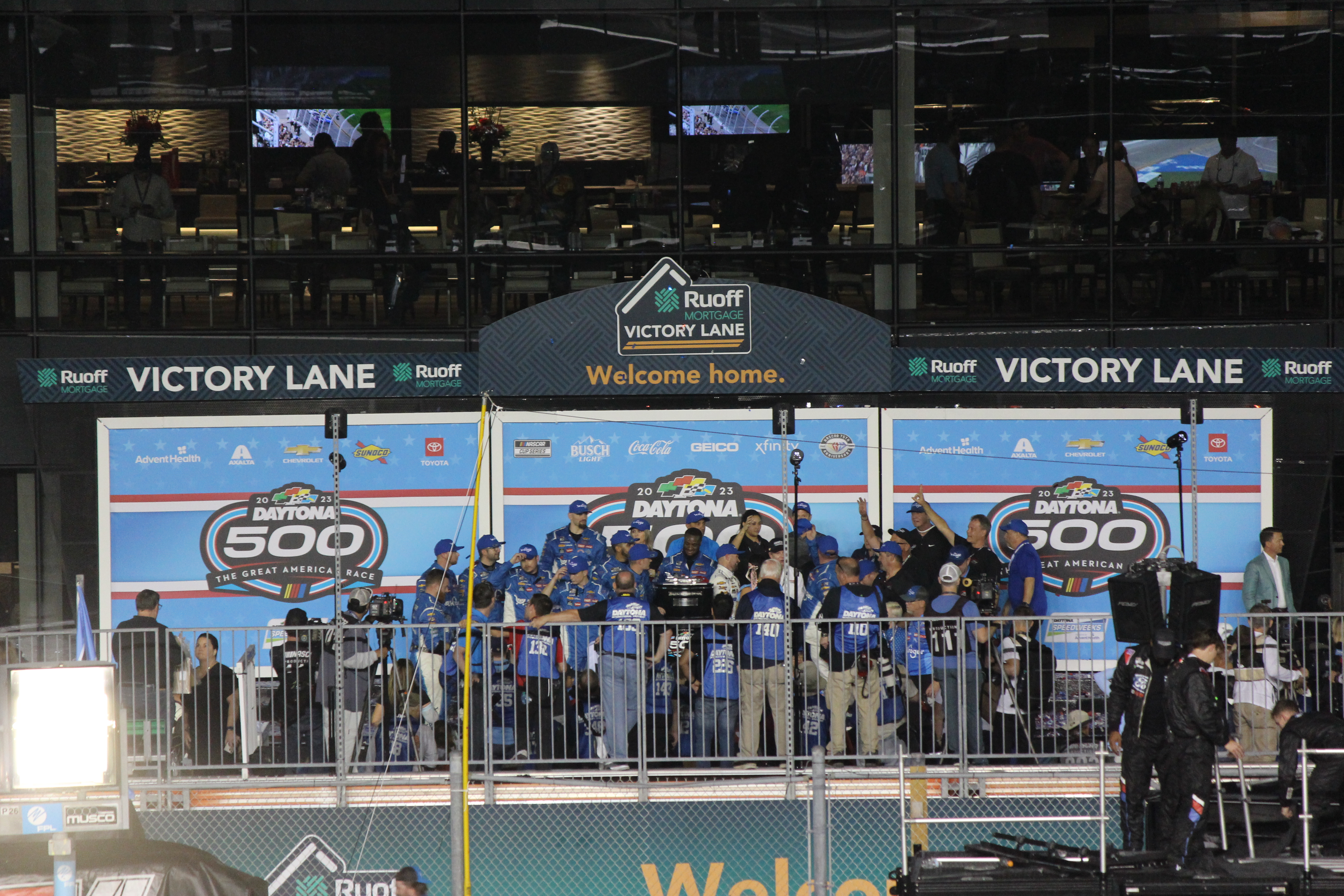
Ricky Stenhouse Jr. in victory lane after the Daytona 500

The race began with Alex Bowman and Kyle Larson on the front row, The next few laps Larson and Bowman exchanged the lead.

10 laps in, the inside line began to show its strength, with Larson, Joey Logano, and Christopher Bell making up the top 3 of the field. A third line emerged with Bubba Wallace, Tyler Reddick and Justin Haley, but quickly faded. Smoke started billowing from Ty Dillon's car on lap 28. His team pushed him to the garage, and discovered an engine problem, making him the first driver to retire from the race.

Between laps 37 and 40, the drivers made their first pit stops. On lap 38 there was a spin by Riley Herbst, however NASCAR did not throw the yellow flag. After the pit cycle, Denny Hamlin took the lead, but was passed by Chase Briscoe on lap 42, as two lines have formed again. On the bottom are Briscoe, Wallace and Aric Almirola, with Hamlin, Bell and Reddick on the top. On lap 55, Wallace had taken the lead but made contact with the backstretch wall after a push from Hamlin and Martin Truex Jr.

On lap 64, two laps from the end of the first stage, A. J. Allmendinger, who was one lap down at the time, blocked and slowed the inside line led by Almirola and Jimmie Johnson, with the intention of getting the free pass at the stage break, leading the top lane, now led by Brad Keselowski and Ryan Preece, to pass Hamlin and Truex. They were followed by Chris Buescher and Kevin Harvick. Keselowski would win the first stage.

The race restarts on lap 72, with Keselowski dropping to the inside to block Preece. Truex and Kyle Busch move to lead the outside line on lap 94, but it has no effect. After another sequence of pit stops, the pack went three wide on lap 112, with Logano and Ryan Blaney leading the race. On lap 117, Harvick bumped Reddick, causing a multi-car incident, the first of many, which would involve almost a dozen cars. Reddick, Erik Jones and Chase Elliott retired from the race, while Blaney received repairs on his right front. The leaders took advantage of the pit stops, with Cindric and Hamlin pitting for two tires while all other teams took four. The race restarted on lap 126, with a group of drivers preferring track position and stage points. Ross Chastain gets down to take the lead from Logano. He begins to block both lines, while Alex Bowman is strong on the outside line with a push from Ricky Stenhouse Jr. Chastain would win the second stage due to a late push from Truex and Logano, in a close finish against Bowman.

During the yellow flag at the end of the second stage, pit stops occurred place, with Chastain getting penalized for going too fast exiting pit lane. Bell was also penalized for passing over equipment, and rookie Noah Gragson was as well for an uncontrolled tire. All three would serve pass-throughs. Wallace stayed out of the pits and would takes the lead of the race at the lap 138 restart. Almirola would overtake him after a push from Buescher, though the yellow flag would come out for debris two laps later, with the right front tire tread coming off Blaney's car in turn two.

Almirola was strong on the inside line on the restart, receiving strong drafting help from Buescher. Wallace tried to stick the middle lane, but wound up losing the draft. On lap 145, Buescher moved up to the outside line with a push from teammate and co-owner Keselowski. They would go on to strongly lead the outside lane as laps go by and the inside line led by Hamlin gains no ground. Wallace's gamble of staying out on the stage break would not pay off, as he pitted for fuel alone with 30 laps to go, and would fall a lap down.

Between laps 176 and 180, drivers began making their final pit stops, with Harrison Burton taking the lead after the cycle. Stenhouse is penalized for speeding, having to make a pass-through on lap 180. With 18 laps to go, the first Big One takes place, with Preece losing control and making a heavy impact on the wall before collecting Harvick, Truex, Johnson, and Chase Briscoe. The race restarts with 14 laps to go, with Burton leading on the outside pushed by Busch, and Logano on the inside with William Byron. Logano would get loose on the straightaway, forcing him up to the outside, losing the draft. A dive-bomb move from Allmendinger would thrust him into the lead until he was overtaken by Keselowski with 10 laps to go.

With laps winding down, both RFK Racing cars of Keselowski and Buscher and the Richard Childress Racing cars of Busch and Austin Dillon remained close each other. With four laps to go, the RCR drivers coordinated with Byron on the back straight to pass Keselowski and Buescher, with Busch taking the lead, looking for his first Daytona 500 victory in his 18th attempt. But on the next lap, Suarez gets a touch from Johnson, sending him spinning at the exit of turn 4, and with this the race went into overtime.

After radio communications on how to take advantage of having his two cars in the first two positions, Richard Childress decided to have Dillon slow the inside line on the restart, to protect Busch, who would immediately switch into that line, in order to command a 1-2 finish for RCR. However, the inside line would lose pace with Logano and Stenhouse passing both cars. On the back straight, Stenhouse, with a push from Larson, passed Logano, and the yellow flag was waved seconds later for another Big One, caused by Byron's touch on Dillon who spun up the track collecting Cindric, Burton, Hamlin, Johnson, Gragson, Todd Gilliland, and Zane Smith.

Both RFK Racing drivers pitted for fuel, in the case that the race could extend into several additional overtimes. Herbst and Almirola also pitted at this time.

The race restarted for a second overtime on lap 210, with Stenhouse leading on the outside and Larson on the inside. Stenhouse grew his lead to a stable amount coming to the white flag, blocking the inside line, leaving Larson without a draft. In turn 2, Almirola bumped Travis Pastrana who lost control and spun, creating the third Big One with Keselowski, Almirola, Busch, Wallace, Allmendinger and Hamlin involved, and the yellow flag was quickly waved, ending the race as the white flag had already flown, with Stenhouse in the lead.

This was confirmed by NASCAR using video replay, confirming that Ricky Stenhouse Jr, driving the No. 47 car for JTG Daugherty Racing, was the winner of the 2023 Daytona 500.

=== Race results ===
==== Stage Results ====
Stage One Laps: 65

Pos	No	Driver	Team	Manufacturer	Points
1	6	Brad Keselowski	RFK Racing	Ford	10
2	41	Ryan Preece	Stewart-Haas Racing	Ford	9
3	17	Chris Buescher	RFK Racing	Ford	8
4	4	Kevin Harvick	Stewart-Haas Racing	Ford	7
5	34	Michael McDowell	Front Row Motorsports	Ford	6
6	54	Ty Gibbs (R)	Joe Gibbs Racing	Toyota	5
7	84	Jimmie Johnson	Legacy Motor Club	Chevrolet	4
8	10	Aric Almirola	Stewart-Haas Racing	Ford	3
9	19	Martin Truex Jr.	Joe Gibbs Racing	Toyota	2
10	38	Todd Gilliland	Front Row Motorsports	Ford	1
Official stage one results

Stage Two Laps: 65

Pos	No	Driver	Team	Manufacturer	Points
1	1	Ross Chastain	Trackhouse Racing	Chevrolet	10
2	48	Alex Bowman	Hendrick Motorsports	Chevrolet	9
3	47	Ricky Stenhouse Jr.	JTG Daugherty Racing	Chevrolet	8
4	22	Joey Logano	Team Penske	Ford	7
5	2	Austin Cindric	Team Penske	Ford	6
6	19	Martin Truex Jr.	Joe Gibbs Racing	Toyota	5
7	24	William Byron	Hendrick Motorsports	Chevrolet	4
8	16	A. J. Allmendinger	Kaulig Racing	Chevrolet	3
9	17	Chris Buescher	RFK Racing	Ford	2
10	20	Christopher Bell	Joe Gibbs Racing	Toyota	1
Official stage two results

=== Final Stage Results ===
Stage Three Laps: 70

Pos	Grid	No	Driver	Team	Manufacturer	Laps	Points
1	31	47	Ricky Stenhouse Jr.	JTG Daugherty Racing	Chevrolet	212	48
2	3	22	Joey Logano	Team Penske	Ford	212	42
3	5	20	Christopher Bell	Joe Gibbs Racing	Toyota	212	35
4	9	17	Chris Buescher	RFK Racing	Ford	212	43
5	1	48	Alex Bowman	Hendrick Motorsports	Chevrolet	212	41
6	29	16	A. J. Allmendinger	Kaulig Racing	Chevrolet	212	34
7	24	99	Daniel Suárez	Trackhouse Racing	Chevrolet	212	30
8	7	12	Ryan Blaney	Team Penske	Ford	212	29
9	23	1	Ross Chastain	Trackhouse Racing	Chevrolet	212	38
10	38	15	Riley Herbst (i)	Rick Ware Racing	Ford	212	0
11	40	67	Travis Pastrana	23XI Racing	Toyota	212	26
12	13	4	Kevin Harvick	Stewart-Haas Racing	Ford	212	32
13	17	36	Zane Smith (i)	Front Row Motorsports	Ford	212	0
14	35	51	Cody Ware	Rick Ware Racing	Ford	212	23
15	16	19	Martin Truex Jr.	Joe Gibbs Racing	Toyota	212	29
16	12	7	Corey LaJoie	Spire Motorsports	Chevrolet	212	21
17	18	11	Denny Hamlin	Joe Gibbs Racing	Toyota	212	20
18	2	5	Kyle Larson	Hendrick Motorsports	Chevrolet	211	19
19	36	8	Kyle Busch	Richard Childress Racing	Chevrolet	211	18
20	15	23	Bubba Wallace	23XI Racing	Toyota	211	17
21	4	10	Aric Almirola	Stewart-Haas Racing	Ford	211	19
22	10	6	Brad Keselowski	RFK Racing	Ford	211	25
23	6	2	Austin Cindric	Team Penske	Ford	210	20
24	22	42	Noah Gragson (R)	Legacy Motor Club	Chevrolet	210	13
25	33	54	Ty Gibbs (R)	Joe Gibbs Racing	Toyota	210	17
26	19	21	Harrison Burton	Wood Brothers Racing	Ford	210	11
27	14	38	Todd Gilliland	Front Row Motorsports	Ford	208	11
28	11	34	Michael McDowell	Front Row Motorsports	Ford	208	15
29	34	50	Conor Daly (i)	The Money Team Racing	Chevrolet	206	0
30	32	78	B. J. McLeod	Live Fast Motorsports	Chevrolet	204	7
31	39	84	Jimmie Johnson	Legacy Motor Club	Chevrolet	203	10
32	28	31	Justin Haley	Kaulig Racing	Chevrolet	203	5
33	27	3	Austin Dillon	Richard Childress Racing	Chevrolet	202	4
34	21	24	William Byron	Hendrick Motorsports	Chevrolet	202	7
35	30	14	Chase Briscoe	Stewart-Haas Racing	Ford	182	2
36	20	41	Ryan Preece	Stewart-Haas Racing	Ford	181	10
37	25	43	Erik Jones	Legacy Motor Club	Chevrolet	118	1
38	8	9	Chase Elliott	Hendrick Motorsports	Chevrolet	118	1
39	26	45	Tyler Reddick	23XI Racing	Toyota	117	1
40	37	77	Ty Dillon	Spire Motorsports	Chevrolet	26	1
Official race results

=== Race statistics ===
- Lead changes: 52 among 21 different drivers
- Cautions/Laps: 8 for 38 laps
- Red flags: 0
- Time of race: 3 hours, 38 minutes and 53 seconds
- Average speed: 145.283 miles per hour (233.810 km/h)

== Media ==
=== Television ===
Since 2001—with the exception of 2002, 2004 and 2006—the Daytona 500 has been carried by Fox in the United States. The booth crew consists of longtime NASCAR lap-by-lap announcer Mike Joy, Clint Bowyer, and three-time NASCAR Cup Series champion and co-owner of Stewart-Haas Racing Tony Stewart. Jamie Little, Regan Smith and Josh Sims handled pit road for the television side. 1992 and 1998 Daytona 500 winning crew chief Larry McReynolds provided insight from the Fox Sports studio in Charlotte.

Fox Television
Booth announcers	Pit reporters	In-race analyst
Lap-by-lap: Mike Joy; Color-commentator: Clint Bowyer; Color-commentator: Tony Stewart	Jamie Little; Regan Smith; Josh Sims	Larry McReynolds

=== Radio ===
The race was broadcast on radio by the Motor Racing Network who has covered the Daytona 500 since 1970—and simulcast on Sirius XM NASCAR Radio. The booth crew consists of Alex Hayden, Jeff Striegle, and 1989 Cup Series champion Rusty Wallace. Longtime turn announcer Dave Moody was the lead turn announcer, calling the race from atop the Sunoco tower outside the exit of turn 2 when the field races through turns 1 and 2. Mike Bagley works the backstretch for the race from a spotter's stand on the inside of the track & Kyle Rickey called the race when the field races through turns 3 and 4 from the Sunoco tower outside the exit of turn 4. On pit road, MRN was operated by Steve Post, Kim Coon, Brienne Pedigo and Dillon Welch.

MRN Radio
Booth announcers	Turn announcers	Pit reporters
Lead announcer: Alex Hayden; Announcer: Jeff Striegle; Announcer: Rusty Wallace	Turns 1 & 2: Dave Moody; Backstretch: Mike Bagley; Turns 3 & 4: Kyle Rickey	Steve Post; Dillon Welch; Brienne Pedigo; Kim Coon

== Standings after the race ==
Drivers' Championship standings

Pos	Driver	Points
1	Joey Logano	52
2	Chris Buescher	50 (–2)
3	Ricky Stenhouse Jr.	48 (–4)
4	Christopher Bell	44 (–8)
5	Alex Bowman	41 (–11)
6	Ross Chastain	38 (–14)
7	Ryan Blaney	37 (–15)
8	Kevin Harvick	37 (–15)
9	A. J. Allmendinger	34 (–18)
10	Martin Truex Jr.	32 (–20)
11	Brad Keselowski	32 (–20)
12	Daniel Suárez	30 (–22)
13	Aric Almirola	29 (–21)
14	Austin Cindric	29 (–21)
15	Corey LaJoie	27 (–23)
16	Travis Pastrana	26 (–24)
Official driver's standings

Manufacturers' Championship standings

Pos	Manufacturer	Points
1	Chevrolet	40
2	Ford	35 (–5)
3	Toyota	34 (–6)

- Note: Only the first 16 positions are included for the driver standings.

== Notes ==
Previous race: 2022 NASCAR Cup Series Championship Race	NASCAR Cup Series; 2023 season	Next race: 2023 Pala Casino 400
