= 2023 Pala Casino 400 =

Second race of the 2023 NASCAR Cup Series

Race details
- Race 2 of 36 in the 2023 NASCAR Cup Series
- Date: February 26, 2023
- Location: Auto Club Speedway in Fontana, California
- Course: Permanent racing facility
- Course length: 3.22 km (2 miles)
- Distance: 200 laps, 400 mi (640 km)

Pole position
Driver	Christopher Bell	Joe Gibbs Racing
- Time: 4.250 (Pandemic Formula)

Most laps led
Driver	Ross Chastain	Trackhouse Racing
- Laps: 91

Winner
No. 8	Kyle Busch	Richard Childress Racing

Television in the United States
- Network: Fox
- Announcers: Mike Joy, Clint Bowyer, and Tony Stewart

Radio in the United States
- Radio: MRN
- Booth announcers: Alex Hayden, Jeff Striegle, and Todd Gordon
- Turn announcers: Dan Hubbard (1 & 2) and Kyle Rickey (3 & 4)

The 2023 Pala Casino 400 was a NASCAR Cup Series race that was held on February 26, 2023, at Auto Club Speedway in Fontana, California. It was contested over 200 laps on the two-mile (3.2 km) D-shaped oval and it was the second race of the 2023 NASCAR Cup Series season. Kyle Busch won the race, earning his first win with Richard Childress Racing. It was the final race on the 2 mile oval, as the track has since closed for reconstruction into a 0.5 mile short track.

== Report ==
=== Background ===
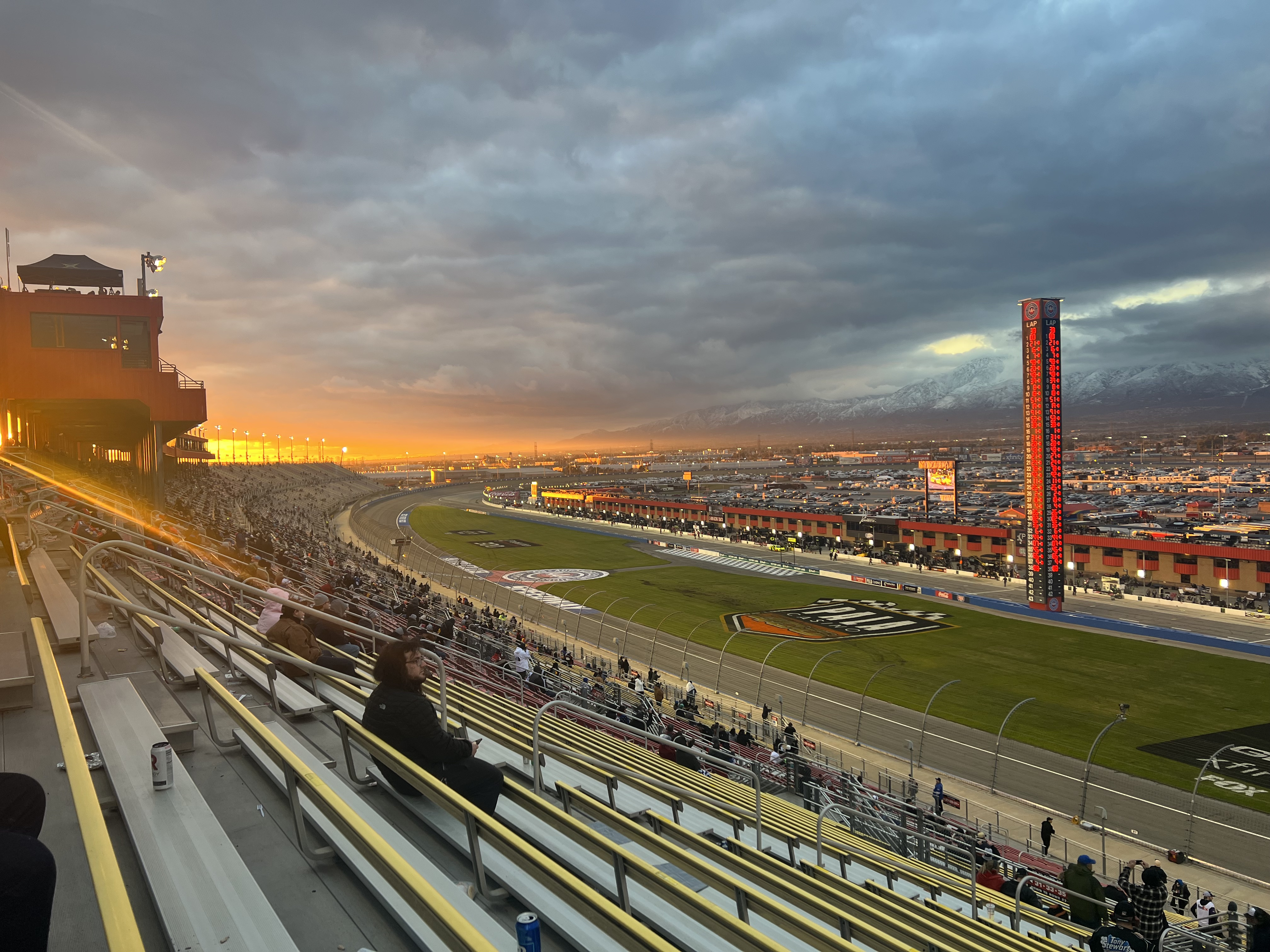
Auto Club Speedway, the track where the race was held.

Auto Club Speedway (previously California Speedway) was a two-mile (3.2 km), low-banked, D-shaped oval superspeedway in Fontana, California which hosted NASCAR racing annually from 1997 to 2023. It was also used for open wheel racing events. The racetrack was located near the former locations of Ontario Motor Speedway and Riverside International Raceway. The track was owned and operated by International Speedway Corporation and was the only track owned by ISC to have its naming rights sold. The speedway was served by the nearby Interstate 10 and Interstate 15 freeways as well as a Metrolink station located behind the backstretch.

==== Entry list ====
- (R) denotes rookie driver.
- (i) denotes driver who is ineligible for series driver points.

No.	Driver	Team	Manufacturer
1	Ross Chastain	Trackhouse Racing	Chevrolet
2	Austin Cindric	Team Penske	Ford
3	Austin Dillon	Richard Childress Racing	Chevrolet
4	Kevin Harvick	Stewart-Haas Racing	Ford
5	Kyle Larson	Hendrick Motorsports	Chevrolet
6	Brad Keselowski	RFK Racing	Ford
7	Corey LaJoie	Spire Motorsports	Chevrolet
8	Kyle Busch	Richard Childress Racing	Chevrolet
9	Chase Elliott	Hendrick Motorsports	Chevrolet
10	Aric Almirola	Stewart-Haas Racing	Ford
11	Denny Hamlin	Joe Gibbs Racing	Toyota
12	Ryan Blaney	Team Penske	Ford
14	Chase Briscoe	Stewart-Haas Racing	Ford
15	J. J. Yeley	Rick Ware Racing	Ford
16	A. J. Allmendinger	Kaulig Racing	Chevrolet
17	Chris Buescher	RFK Racing	Ford
19	Martin Truex Jr.	Joe Gibbs Racing	Toyota
20	Christopher Bell	Joe Gibbs Racing	Toyota
21	Harrison Burton	Wood Brothers Racing	Ford
22	Joey Logano	Team Penske	Ford
23	Bubba Wallace	23XI Racing	Toyota
24	William Byron	Hendrick Motorsports	Chevrolet
31	Justin Haley	Kaulig Racing	Chevrolet
34	Michael McDowell	Front Row Motorsports	Ford
38	Todd Gilliland	Front Row Motorsports	Ford
41	Ryan Preece	Stewart-Haas Racing	Ford
42	Noah Gragson (R)	Legacy Motor Club	Chevrolet
43	Erik Jones	Legacy Motor Club	Chevrolet
45	Tyler Reddick	23XI Racing	Toyota
47	Ricky Stenhouse Jr.	JTG Daugherty Racing	Chevrolet
48	Alex Bowman	Hendrick Motorsports	Chevrolet
51	Cody Ware	Rick Ware Racing	Ford
54	Ty Gibbs (R)	Joe Gibbs Racing	Toyota
77	Ty Dillon	Spire Motorsports	Chevrolet
78	B. J. McLeod	Live Fast Motorsports	Chevrolet
99	Daniel Suárez	Trackhouse Racing	Chevrolet
Official entry list

== Practice ==
Practice was cancelled due to inclement weather.

== Qualifying ==
Qualifying was cancelled due to inclement weather. Christopher Bell was awarded the pole for the race as a result of NASCAR's "pandemic formula" with a score of 4.250.

=== Pandemic Formula ===
Since the August 2020 Daytona Grand Prix, NASCAR has used a formula to determine the starting field for races when qualifying was not held, as was the case for most of the 2020 season and 2021 season, and if inclement weather prevents qualification rounds to be held. Currently, it is used to determine qualifying order and practice order (which is grouped into odd and even based on ranking), and if necessary, determines starting fields in case of cancellations.

The formula is based on the 2023 owner points standings and the results of the previous race on the schedule. The finishing order from the driver counts as 25% of the score, and the entrant (as in car number) finish counts as 25% of the score. 35% of the score is based on the current owner points standings (counting the final result of the race and the top ten bonus points from qualifying races and the top ten drivers on Lap 65 and 130), and 15% of the order is based on the driver's fastest lap ranking from the race. If a driver did not participate, they are scored 41st place in driver finish and fastest lap. If a team used a driver ineligible for Cup Series points, the points earned by the driver will still be awarded to the car owner for purposes of this formula.

=== Starting Lineup ===
Pos	No.	Driver	Team	Manufacturer	Score
1	20	Christopher Bell	Joe Gibbs Racing	Toyota	4.250
2	47	Ricky Stenhouse Jr.	JTG Daugherty Racing	Chevrolet	5.450
3	22	Joey Logano	Team Penske	Ford	6.150
4	48	Alex Bowman	Hendrick Motorsports	Chevrolet	6.350
5	17	Chris Buescher	RFK Racing	Ford	7.650
6	16	A. J. Allmendinger	Kaulig Racing	Chevrolet	8.100
7	99	Daniel Suárez	Trackhouse Racing	Chevrolet	8.600
8	1	Ross Chastain	Trackhouse Racing	Chevrolet	8.850
9	12	Ryan Blaney	Team Penske	Ford	9.450
10	4	Kevin Harvick	Stewart-Haas Racing	Ford	14.200
11	51	Cody Ware	Rick Ware Racing	Ford	14.300
12	7	Corey LaJoie	Spire Motorsports	Chevrolet	15.150
13	11	Denny Hamlin	Joe Gibbs Racing	Toyota	16.300
14	19	Martin Truex Jr.	Joe Gibbs Racing	Toyota	16.700
15	5	Kyle Larson	Hendrick Motorsports	Chevrolet	19.300
16	6	Brad Keselowski	RFK Racing	Ford	19.950
17	10	Aric Almirola	Stewart-Haas Racing	Ford	20.600
18	23	Bubba Wallace	23XI Racing	Toyota	21.000
19	2	Austin Cindric	Team Penske	Ford	21.650
20	42	Noah Gragson (R)	Legacy Motor Club	Chevrolet	22.500
21	8	Kyle Busch	Richard Childress Racing	Chevrolet	22.550
22	15	J. J. Yeley	Rick Ware Racing	Ford	24.150
23	54	Ty Gibbs (R)	Joe Gibbs Racing	Toyota	24.400
24	21	Harrison Burton	Wood Brothers Racing	Ford	25.350
25	38	Todd Gilliland	Front Row Motorsports	Ford	26.350
26	34	Michael McDowell	Front Row Motorsports	Ford	26.400
27	41	Ryan Preece	Stewart-Haas Racing	Ford	28.300
28	3	Austin Dillon	Richard Childress Racing	Chevrolet	29.700
29	31	Justin Haley	Kaulig Racing	Chevrolet	30.950
30	78	B. J. McLeod	Live Fast Motorsports	Chevrolet	31.100
31	14	Chase Briscoe	Stewart-Haas Racing	Ford	31.200
32	24	William Byron	Hendrick Motorsports	Chevrolet	32.150
33	9	Chase Elliott	Hendrick Motorsports	Chevrolet	32.700
34	43	Erik Jones	Legacy Motor Club	Chevrolet	34.200
35	45	Tyler Reddick	23XI Racing	Toyota	36.600
36	77	Ty Dillon	Spire Motorsports	Chevrolet	40.000
Official starting lineup

== Race ==
=== Race results ===
==== Stage Results ====
Stage One Laps: 65

Pos	No	Driver	Team	Manufacturer	Points
1	1	Ross Chastain	Trackhouse Racing	Chevrolet	10
2	12	Ryan Blaney	Team Penske	Ford	9
3	99	Daniel Suárez	Trackhouse Racing	Chevrolet	8
4	48	Alex Bowman	Hendrick Motorsports	Chevrolet	7
5	11	Denny Hamlin	Joe Gibbs Racing	Toyota	6
6	24	William Byron	Hendrick Motorsports	Chevrolet	5
7	22	Joey Logano	Team Penske	Ford	4
8	4	Kevin Harvick	Stewart-Haas Racing	Ford	3
9	19	Martin Truex Jr.	Joe Gibbs Racing	Toyota	2
10	9	Chase Elliott	Hendrick Motorsports	Chevrolet	1
Official stage one results

Stage Two Laps: 65

Pos	No	Driver	Team	Manufacturer	Points
1	1	Ross Chastain	Trackhouse Racing	Chevrolet	10
2	8	Kyle Busch	Richard Childress Racing	Chevrolet	9
3	22	Joey Logano	Team Penske	Ford	8
4	4	Kevin Harvick	Stewart-Haas Racing	Ford	7
5	99	Daniel Suárez	Trackhouse Racing	Chevrolet	6
6	11	Denny Hamlin	Joe Gibbs Racing	Toyota	5
7	9	Chase Elliott	Hendrick Motorsports	Chevrolet	4
8	48	Alex Bowman	Hendrick Motorsports	Chevrolet	3
9	6	Brad Keselowski	RFK Racing	Ford	2
10	7	Corey LaJoie	Spire Motorsports	Chevrolet	1
Official stage two results

=== Final Stage Results ===
Stage Three Laps: 70

Pos	Grid	No	Driver	Team	Manufacturer	Laps	Points
1	21	8	Kyle Busch	Richard Childress Racing	Chevrolet	200	49
2	33	9	Chase Elliott	Hendrick Motorsports	Chevrolet	200	40
3	8	1	Ross Chastain	Trackhouse Racing	Chevrolet	200	54
4	7	99	Daniel Suárez	Trackhouse Racing	Chevrolet	200	47
5	10	4	Kevin Harvick	Stewart-Haas Racing	Ford	200	42
6	13	11	Denny Hamlin	Joe Gibbs Racing	Toyota	200	42
7	16	6	Brad Keselowski	RFK Racing	Ford	200	32
8	4	48	Alex Bowman	Hendrick Motorsports	Chevrolet	200	39
9	28	3	Austin Dillon	Richard Childress Racing	Chevrolet	200	28
10	3	22	Joey Logano	Team Penske	Ford	200	39
11	14	19	Martin Truex Jr.	Joe Gibbs Racing	Toyota	200	28
12	2	47	Ricky Stenhouse Jr.	JTG Daugherty Racing	Chevrolet	200	25
13	5	17	Chris Buescher	RFK Racing	Ford	200	24
14	12	7	Corey LaJoie	Spire Motorsports	Chevrolet	200	24
15	24	21	Harrison Burton	Wood Brothers Racing	Ford	200	22
16	23	54	Ty Gibbs (R)	Joe Gibbs Racing	Toyota	200	21
17	25	38	Todd Gilliland	Front Row Motorsports	Ford	200	20
18	26	34	Michael McDowell	Front Row Motorsports	Ford	200	19
19	34	43	Erik Jones	Legacy Motor Club	Chevrolet	200	18
20	31	14	Chase Briscoe	Stewart-Haas Racing	Ford	200	17
21	29	31	Justin Haley	Kaulig Racing	Chevrolet	199	16
22	20	42	Noah Gragson (R)	Legacy Motor Club	Chevrolet	199	15
23	22	15	J. J. Yeley	Rick Ware Racing	Ford	199	14
24	30	78	B. J. McLeod	Live Fast Motorsports	Chevrolet	199	13
25	32	24	William Byron	Hendrick Motorsports	Chevrolet	198	17
26	9	12	Ryan Blaney	Team Penske	Ford	196	20
27	11	51	Cody Ware	Rick Ware Racing	Ford	195	10
28	19	2	Austin Cindric	Team Penske	Ford	194	9
29	15	5	Kyle Larson	Hendrick Motorsports	Chevrolet	185	8
30	18	23	Bubba Wallace	23XI Racing	Toyota	172	7
31	36	77	Ty Dillon	Spire Motorsports	Chevrolet	140	6
32	1	20	Christopher Bell	Joe Gibbs Racing	Toyota	88	5
33	27	41	Ryan Preece	Stewart-Haas Racing	Ford	87	4
34	35	45	Tyler Reddick	23XI Racing	Toyota	87	3
35	17	10	Aric Almirola	Stewart-Haas Racing	Ford	86	2
36	6	16	A. J. Allmendinger	Kaulig Racing	Chevrolet	75	1
Official race results

=== Race statistics ===
- Lead changes: 28 among 13 different drivers
- Cautions/Laps: 8 for 38 laps
- Red flags: 0
- Time of race: 3 hours, 8 minutes and 5 seconds
- Average speed: 127.603 miles per hour (205.357 km/h)

== Media ==
=== Television ===
The race was the 22nd race Fox Sports covered at the Auto Club Speedway. Mike Joy, Clint Bowyer and three-time NASCAR Cup Series champion, two-time Fontana winner and co-owner of Stewart-Haas Racing Tony Stewart called the race in the booth for Fox. Jamie Little and Regan Smith handled the pit road duties, and Larry McReynolds provided insight from the Fox Sports studio in Charlotte.

Fox
Booth announcers	Pit reporters	In-race analyst
Lap-by-lap: Mike Joy; Color-commentator: Clint Bowyer; Color-commentator: Tony Stewart	Jamie Little; Regan Smith	Larry McReynolds

=== Radio ===
MRN had the radio call for the race, which was also simulcast on Sirius XM NASCAR Radio. Alex Hayden, Jeff Striegle, and 2018 NASCAR Cup Championship crew chief Todd Gordon called the race from the booth when the field raced their way down the front stretch. Dan Hubbard called the race from a billboard outside turn 2 when the field raced their way through turns 1 and 2, and Kyle Rickey called the race from a billboard outside turn 3 when the field raced their way through turns 3 and 4. Steve Post and Jason Toy had the pit road duties for MRN.

MRN
Booth announcers	Turn announcers	Pit reporters
Lead announcer: Alex Hayden; Announcer: Jeff Striegle; Announcer: Todd Gordon	Turns 1 & 2: Dan Hubbard; Turns 3 & 4: Kyle Rickey	Steve Post; Jason Toy

== Standings after the race ==
Drivers' Championship standings

	Pos	Driver	Points
5	1	Ross Chastain	92
1	2	Joey Logano	91 (–1)
2	3	Alex Bowman	80 (–12)
4	4	Kevin Harvick	79 (–13)
7	5	Daniel Suárez	77 (–15)
4	6	Chris Buescher	74 (–18)
4	7	Ricky Stenhouse Jr.	73 (–19)
14	8	Kyle Busch	67 (–25)
10	9	Denny Hamlin	64 (–28)
1	10	Brad Keselowski	64 (–28)
1	11	Martin Truex Jr.	60 (–32)
5	12	Ryan Blaney	57 (–35)
2	13	Corey LaJoie	51 (–41)
15	14	Chase Elliott	49 (–43)
11	15	Christopher Bell	49 (–43)
5	16	Michael McDowell	40 (–52)
Official driver's standings

Manufacturers' Championship standings

Pos	Manufacturer	Points
1	Chevrolet	80
2	Ford	67 (–13)
3	Toyota	65 (–15)

- Note: Only the first 16 positions are included for the driver standings.

Previous race: 2023 Daytona 500	NASCAR Cup Series; 2023 season	Next race: 2023 Pennzoil 400
