= 2021 Petit Le Mans =

Sportscar endurance race in Georgia, US

The Track map of Road Atlanta

The 2021 Petit Le Mans (known as the 2021 MOTUL Petit Le Mans for sponsorship reasons) was the 24th running of the Petit Le Mans, and was held on November 13, 2021. It was the 12th and final race in the 2021 IMSA SportsCar Championship, and the 4th race of the 2021 Michelin Endurance Cup. The race was held at Road Atlanta in Braselton, Georgia. This race was the last ever race for the GTLM Class.

== Background ==
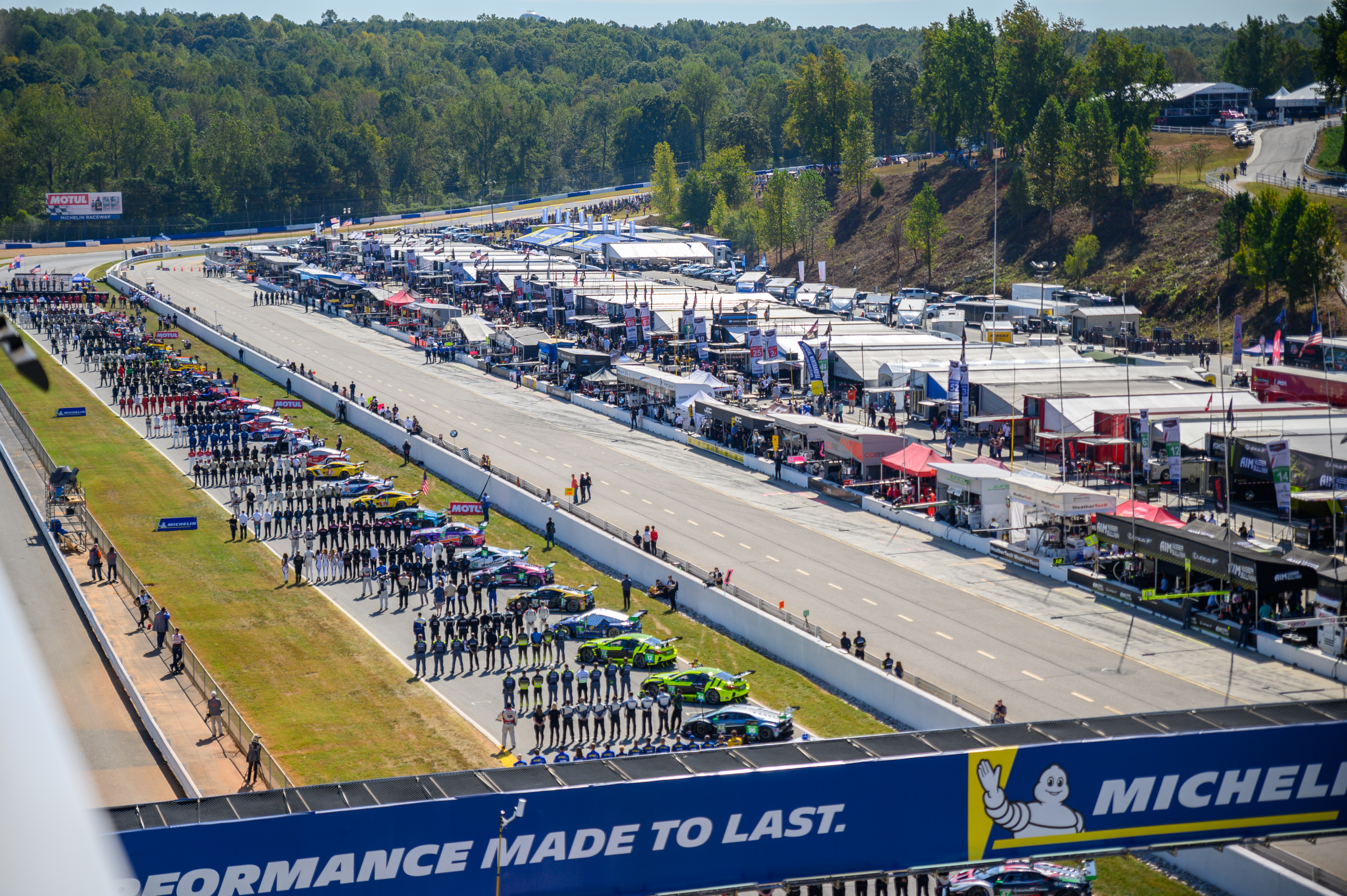
Michelin Raceway Road Atlanta, where the race was held.

International Motor Sports Association's (IMSA) president John Doonan confirmed the race was part of the schedule for the 2021 IMSA SportsCar Championship (IMSA SCC) in September 2020. It was the eighth consecutive year it was part of the IMSA SCC, and 24th Petit Le Mans. The 2021 Petit Le Mans was final of 2021's IMSA sports car endurance races, and the last of four races of the Michelin Endurance Cup (MEC). The race took place at the 12-turn, 2.540-mile (4.088 km) Road Atlanta in Braselton, Georgia.

The 2021 running marked the event's return to the final calendar spot on the schedule following the wholesale schedule changes that resulted from the COVID-19 pandemic in 2020. The 2021 edition underwent a date change of its own, being postponed from its traditional early-October spot to the weekend of November 13th. The event featured support from four of IMSA's supporting series; the Michelin Pilot Challenge, IMSA Prototype Challenge, Porsche Carrera Cup North America, and Mazda MX-5 Cup.

On November 3, 2021, IMSA released the latest technical bulletin outlining Balance of Performance for the event. In GTLM, the Chevrolet Corvette C8.R received a one-liter reduction in fuel capacity, while in GTD the 2021 debut of the McLaren required its addition to the BoP table.

This would be the final race for entry Mazda Motorsports as Mazda was stepping back from all racing activities following the 2021 season with the exception of the Mazda MX-5 Cup. Also making its farewell was the GTLM class which in 2022 would be replaced by the new GTD Pro class.

Before the race, Filipe Albuquerque and Ricky Taylor led the DPi Drivers' Championship with 3071 points, ahead of Pipo Derani and Felipe Nasr in second with 3052 points. In LMP2, Mikkel Jensen and Ben Keating led the Drivers' Championship with 1807 points, ahead of Tristan Nunez and Steven Thomas. With 1800 points, Gar Robinson led the LMP3 Drivers' Championship, 50 points ahead of Jon Bennett and Colin Braun. Antonio García and Jordan Taylor led the GTLM Drivers' Championship with 3269 points, 127 points ahead of Tommy Milner and Nick Tandy. With 2938 points, the GTD Drivers' Championship was led by Zacharie Robichon and Laurens Vanthoor, ahead of Madison Snow and Bryan Sellers. Cadillac, Chevrolet, and Porsche were leading their respective Manufacturers' Championships, while WTR-Konica Minolta Acura, PR1/Mathiasen Motorsports, Riley Motorsports, Corvette Racing, and Pfaff Motorsports each led their own Teams' Championships.

=== Entries ===
A total of 43 cars took part in the event, split across five classes. 7 were entered in DPi, 5 in LMP2, 10 in LMP3, 6 in GTLM, and 15 in GTD.

In DPi, the expected addition of the Endurance Cup effort from Ally Cadillac Racing was present, while Hélio Castroneves replaced Olivier Pla as Meyer Shank Racing's third driver. In LMP2, United Autosports returned to complete their scheduled Endurance Cup campaign. In GTLM the pair of BMW Team RLL M8s returned for the Endurance Cup, WeatherTech Racing also added a second entry, which alongside its own full time entry and the two Corvettes boosted the class to six entries for its last ever race. LMP3 saw its largest grid of the season with ten cars, which included a series debut for FastMD Racing. Returns for United Autosports, Forty7 Motorsports, Jr III Racing (whose lineup included former IndyCar driver Spencer Pigot), and WIN Autosport helped to boost the class to its record-breaking entry number. GTD also featured a number of changes, including the first appearance of the season for the McLaren 720S GT3, fielded by Inception Racing. NTE Sport and Gilbert/Korthoff Motorsports also returned as part of their selective 2021 calendars, as did Alegra Motorsports, who added Mercedes-AMG factor driver Daniel Juncadella to their lineup. Winward Racing also returned for the first time since their class victory at the 24 Hours of Daytona, while the Heart of Racing Team dropped their second entry.

Just hours before the race, Earl Bamber stepped in for Kevin Magnussen in Chip Ganassi Racing's DPi-class entry after Magnussen fell ill.

== Practice ==
There were three practice sessions preceding the start of the race on Saturday, all three one on Thursday. The first session on Thursday morning lasted one hour. The second session on Thursday afternoon lasted 75 minutes. The final session on Thursday evening lasted 90 minutes.

=== Practice 1 ===
The first practice session took place at 9:20 am ET on Thursday and ended with Felipe Nasr topping the charts for Whelen Engineering Racing, with a lap time of 1:09.508, ahead of the No. 01 Cadillac of Renger van der Zande. Gabriel Aubry set the fastest time in LMP2. Colin Braun was fastest in LMP3 with a time of 1:15.916. The GTLM class was topped by the No. 97 WeatherTech Racing Porsche 911 RSR-19 of Frédéric Makowiecki with a time of 1:16.726. Mathieu Jaminet was second in the sister No. 79 WeatherTech Racing entry and Antonio García rounded out the top 3. Bill Auberlen set the fastest time in GTD. The session was red flagged twice. 33 minutes into the session, the No. 55 Mazda RT24-P of Jonathan Bomarito stopped at turn eight due to a mechanical issue. 15 minutes later, Steven Thomas in the No. 11 WIN Autosport entry stopped just before turn ten.

Pos.	Class	No.	Team	Driver	Time	Gap
1	DPi	31	Whelen Engineering Racing	Felipe Nasr	1:09.508	_
2	DPi	01	Cadillac Chip Ganassi Racing	Renger van der Zande	1:09.758	+0.250
3	DPi	60	Meyer Shank Racing with Curb-Agajanian	Dane Cameron	1:10.094	+0.586

=== Practice 2 ===
The second practice session took place at 2:20 pm ET on Thursday and ended with Harry Tincknell topping the charts for Mazda Motorsports, with a lap time of 1:09.356, 0.044 seconds faster than Felipe Nasr's No. 31 Cadillac. Mikkel Jensen set the fastest time in LMP2. Dylan Murry was fastest in LMP3 with a time of 1:16.413. The GTLM class was topped by the No. 4 Corvette Racing Chevrolet Corvette C8.R of Nick Tandy with a time of 1:16.938. Kévin Estre was second fastest in the No. 97 WeatherTech Racing entry and Mathieu Jaminet rounded out the top 3. Robby Foley was fastest in GTD. The session was red flagged three times for on-track incidents. The No. 8 Oreca of John Farano collided with Jan Heylen's Porsche at turn twelve and brought out the first red flag. The No. 36 Andretti Autosport Ligier JS P320 of Oliver Askew stopped on track resulting in the sessions second red flag. The final stoppage came when Jim Cox spun the No. 91 Ligier at turn 10a and got beached.

Pos.	Class	No.	Team	Driver	Time	Gap
1	DPi	55	Mazda Motorsports	Harry Tincknell	1:09.356	_
2	DPi	31	Whelen Engineering Racing	Felipe Nasr	1:09.400	+0.044
3	DPi	5	JDC-Mustang Sampling Racing	Sébastien Bourdais	1:09.571	+0.215

=== Practice 3 ===
The third and final practice session took place at 6:30 pm ET on Thursday and ended with Tristan Vautier topping the charts for JDC-Mustang Sampling Racing, with a lap time of 1:10.796, ahead of The No. 01 Cadillac of Kevin Magnussen. Mikkel Jensen set the fastest time in LMP2. Rasmus Lindh was fastest in LMP3 with a time of 1:16.605. The GTLM class was topped by the No. 97 WeatherTech Racing Porsche 911 RSR-19 of Frédéric Makowiecki with a time of 1:17.253. Mathieu Jaminet was second in the sister No. 79 WeatherTech Racing entry and Jesse Krohn rounded out the top 3. Jack Hawksworth was fastest in GTD.

Pos.	Class	No.	Team	Driver	Time	Gap
1	DPi	5	JDC-Mustang Sampling Racing	Tristan Vautier	1:10.796	_
2	DPi	01	Cadillac Chip Ganassi Racing	Kevin Magnussen	1:10.822	+0.026
3	DPi	55	Mazda Motorsports	Scott Dixon	1:11.427	+0.631

== Qualifying ==
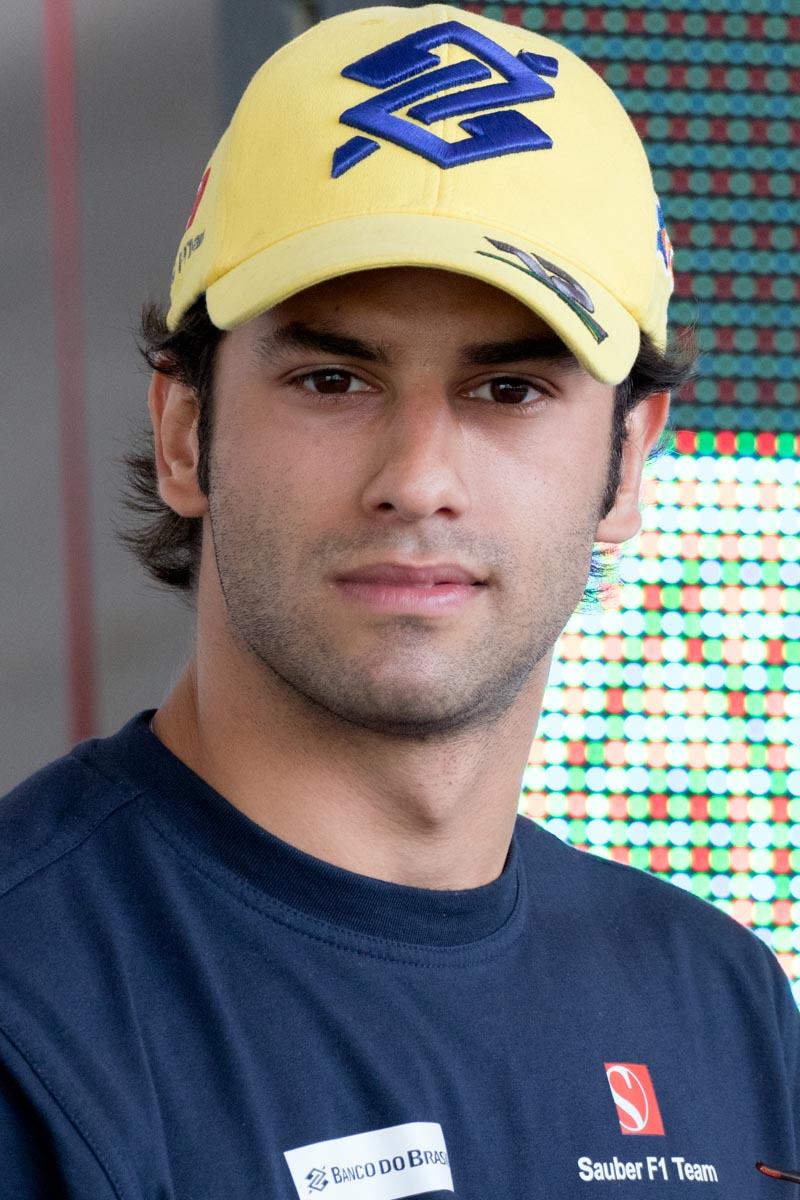
Felipe Nasr (pictured in 2015) helped take the No. 31 Cadillac's fifth pole position of 2021.

Qualifying was broken into four sessions. The first was for cars in GTD class. Madison Snow qualified on pole driving the No. 1 car for Paul Miller Racing, beating Benjamin Hites in the No. 42 NTE Sport entry. Robby Foley was third in the No. 96 BMW followed by Aaron Telitz in the No. 14 Lexus.

The second session was for cars in the GTLM and GTD classes. Jesse Krohn qualified on pole in GTLM driving the No. 24 car for BMW Team RLL, beating Matt Campbell in the No. 79 WeatherTech Racing entry by just over five-tenths of a second. Jack Hawksworth set the fastest time in the GTD points paying session and earned 35 championship points.

The third session was for cars in the LMP3 class. Niklas Krütten qualified on pole for the class driving the No. 2 car for United Autosports, besting Rasmus Lindh in the Performance Tech Motorsports entry.

The final session of qualifying was for cars in the DPi and LMP2 classes. Felipe Nasr took overall pole for the event driving the No. 31 car for Whelen Engineering Racing, beating Harry Tincknell in the Mazda Motorsports entry. Nasr reduced Albuquerque and Taylor's points lead to eight points heading into the race. Ben Keating qualified on pole in LMP2 driving the PR1/Mathiasen Motorsports Oreca.

=== Qualifying results ===
Pole positions in each class are indicated in bold and by ‡.

Pos.	Class	No.	Team	Driver	Time	Gap	Grid
1	**DPi**	**31**	**(United States) Whelen Engineering Racing**	**(Brazil) Felipe Nasr**	**1:08.678**	**_**	1‡
2	DPi	55	(Canada) Mazda Motorsports	(United Kingdom) Harry Tincknell	1:08.693	+0.015	2
3	DPi	5	(United States) JDC-Mustang Sampling Racing	(France) Sébastien Bourdais	1:08.848	+0.170	3
4	DPi	01	(United States) Cadillac Chip Ganassi Racing	(Denmark) Kevin Magnussen	1:08.879	+0.201	7 (Note: The no. 01 Cadillac Chip Ganassi Racing entry was moved to the rear of the DPi classification after the team elected to change starting driver after qualifying.)
5	DPi	60	(United States) Meyer Shank Racing w/ Curb-Agajanian	(United States) Dane Cameron	1:08.920	+0.242	4
6	DPi	48	(United States) Ally Cadillac Racing	(Japan) Kamui Kobayashi	1:09.165	+0.487	5
7	DPi	10	(United States) WTR-Konica Minolta Acura	(Portugal) Filipe Albuquerque	1:09.328	+0.650	6
8	**LMP2**	**52**	**(United States) PR1/Mathiasen Motorsports**	**(United States) Ben Keating**	**1:12.229**	**+3.551**	8‡
9	LMP2	11	(United States) WIN Autosport	(United States) Steven Thomas	1:12.583	+3.905	9
10	LMP2	18	(United States) Era Motorsport	(United States) Dwight Merriman	1:13.070	+4.392	10
11	LMP2	8	(United States) Tower Motorsport By Starworks	(Canada) John Farano	1:14.289	+5.611	11
12	LMP2	22	(United Kingdom) United Autosports	(United States) James McGuire	1:14.814	+6.136	12
13	**GTLM**	**24**	**(United States) BMW Team RLL**	**(Finland) Jesse Krohn**	**1:15.226**	**+6.548**	23‡
14	**LMP3**	**2**	**(United Kingdom) United Autosports**	**(Germany) Niklas Krütten**	**1:15.664**	**+6.986**	13‡
15	GTLM	79	(United States) WeatherTech Racing	(Australia) Matt Campbell	1:15.738	+7.060	24
16	LMP3	38	(United States) Performance Tech Motorsports	(Sweden) Rasmus Lindh	1:15.750	+7.072	14
17	GTLM	3	(United States) Corvette Racing	(Spain) Antonio García	1:15.930	+7.252	25
18	GTLM	97	(United States) WeatherTech Racing	(France) Frederic Makowiecki	1:16.004	+7.326	26
19	GTLM	4	(United States) Corvette Racing	(United Kingdom) Nick Tandy	1:16.051	+7.373	27
20	LMP3	36	(United States) Andretti Autosport	(United States) Jarett Andretti	1:17.122	+8.444	15
21	LMP3	91	(United States) Riley Motorsports	(United States) Jim Cox	1:17.403	+8.725	16
22	LMP3	74	(United States) Riley Motorsports	(United States) Gar Robinson	1:17.535	+8.857	17
23	LMP3	7	(United States) Forty7 Motorsports	(Canada) Stefan Rzadzinski	1:17.793	+9.115	18
24	LMP3	40	(United States) FastMD Racing	(United States) Max Hanratty	1:18.112	+9.434	19
25	LMP3	30	(United States) Jr III Motorsports	(United States) Ari Balogh	1:19.071	+10.393	20
26	**GTD**	**1**	**(United States) Paul Miller Racing**	**(United States) Madison Snow**	**1:19.272**	**+10.594**	29‡
27	GTD	42	(United States) NTE Sport	(Chile) Benjamín Hites	1:19.273	+10.595	30
28	GTD	96	(United States) Turner Motorsport	(United States) Robby Foley	1:19.295	+10.617	31
29	GTD	14	(United States) Vasser Sullivan Racing	(United States) Aaron Telitz	1:19.308	+10.630	43 (Note: The no. 14 Vasser-Sullivan Racing entry was moved to the rear of the GTD classification for violating competition rules regarding the car's ride height.)
30	GTD	12	(United States) Vasser Sullivan Racing	(United States) Frankie Montecalvo	1:19.456	+10.778	32
31	GTD	57	(United States) HTP Winward Motorsport	(United States) Russell Ward	1:19.661	+10.983	33
32	GTD	16	(United States) Wright Motorsports	(United States) Trent Hindman	1:19.722	+11.044	34
33	GTD	9	(Canada) Pfaff Motorsports	(Canada) Zacharie Robichon	1:19.791	+11.113	35
34	GTD	70	(United Kingdom) Inception Racing with Optimum Motorsport	(Denmark) Frederik Schandorff	1:19.800	+11.122	36
35	GTD	28	(United States) Alegra Motorsports	(Canada) Daniel Morad	1:19.846	+11.168	37
36	GTD	19	(Austria) GRT Grasser Racing Team	(Canada) Misha Goikhberg	1:20.068	+11.390	38
37	GTD	88	(United States) Team Hardpoint	(United States) Andrew Davis	1:20.079	+11.401	39
38	GTD	32	(United States) Gilbert Korthoff Motorsports	(United States) Guy Cosmo	1:20.353	+11.675	40
39	GTD	23	(United States) Heart Of Racing Team	(United Kingdom) Ian James	1:20.554	+11.876	42 (Note: The no. 23 Heart of Racing Team entry was moved to the rear of the GTD classification after the team elected to change tires after qualifying.)
40	GTLM	25	(United States) BMW Team RLL	(United States) Connor De Phillippi	1:21.299	+12.621	28
41	GTD	44	(United States) Magnus Racing with Archangel Motorsports	(United States) John Potter	1:21.317	+12.639	41 (Note: The no. 44 Magnus Racing with Archangel Motorsports entry was moved to the rear of the GTD classification after the team elected to change tires after qualifying.)
—	LMP3	54	(United States) CORE Autosport	Did Not Participate			21
—	LMP3	83	(United States) WIN Autosport	No Time Established			22 (Note: The no. 83 WIN Autosport entry was moved to the rear of the LMP3 classification after the team elected to change tires after qualifying.)

== Race ==
=== Post-race ===
Derani and Nasr took the DPi Drivers' Championship with 3407 points. They were 11 points ahead of Filipe Albuquerque and Ricky Taylor. With 2162 points, Jensen and Keating won the LMP2 Drivers' Championship, 136 points ahead of Nunez and Thomas in second. With 2176 points, Robinson won the LMP3 Drivers' Championship, 186 points ahead of Bennett and Braun. Antonio García and Jordan Taylor took the GTLM Drivers' Championship with 3549 points. They were 101 points ahead of Milner and Tandy in second. MacNeil was third with 3356 points and Campbell was fourth with 2084 points. With 3284 points, Robichon and Vanthoor won the GTD Drivers' Championship, 121 points ahead of Sellers and Snow in second. De Angelis and Gunn were third position with 3111 points and Long was fourth with 2943 points. Cadillac, Chevrolet, and Porsche won their respective Manufactures' Championships while Whelen Engineering Racing, PR1/Mathiasen Motorsports, Riley Motorsports, Corvette Racing, and Pfaff Motorsports won their respective Teams' Championships.

=== Results ===
Class winners denoted in bold and with ‡

Pos	Class	No.	Team / Entrant	Drivers	Chassis	Laps	Time/Retired
Pos	Class	No.	Team / Entrant	Drivers	Engine	Laps	Time/Retired
1	**DPi**	**55**	**(Canada) Mazda Motorsports**	**(United States) Jonathan Bomarito (United Kingdom) Oliver Jarvis (United Kingdom) Harry Tincknell**	**Mazda RT24-P**	**410**	**10:00:38.581‡**
1	**DPi**	**55**	**(Canada) Mazda Motorsports**	**(United States) Jonathan Bomarito (United Kingdom) Oliver Jarvis (United Kingdom) Harry Tincknell**	**Mazda MZ-2.0T 2.0 L Turbo I4**	**410**	**10:00:38.581‡**
2	DPi	31	(United States) Whelen Engineering Racing	(United Kingdom) Mike Conway (Brazil) Pipo Derani (Brazil) Felipe Nasr	Cadillac DPi-V.R	410	+3.297
2	DPi	31	(United States) Whelen Engineering Racing	(United Kingdom) Mike Conway (Brazil) Pipo Derani (Brazil) Felipe Nasr	Cadillac 5.5 L V8	410	+3.297
3	DPi	10	(United States) Konica Minolta Acura ARX-05	(Portugal) Filipe Albuquerque (United States) Alexander Rossi (United States) Ricky Taylor	Acura ARX-05	410	+3.702
3	DPi	10	(United States) Konica Minolta Acura ARX-05	(Portugal) Filipe Albuquerque (United States) Alexander Rossi (United States) Ricky Taylor	Acura AR35TT 3.5 L Turbo V6	410	+3.702
4	DPi	48	(United States) Ally Cadillac Racing	(United States) Jimmie Johnson (Japan) Kamui Kobayashi (France) Simon Pagenaud	Cadillac DPi-V.R	410	+30.681
4	DPi	48	(United States) Ally Cadillac Racing	(United States) Jimmie Johnson (Japan) Kamui Kobayashi (France) Simon Pagenaud	Cadillac 5.5 L V8	410	+30.681
5	DPi	01	(United States) Cadillac Chip Ganassi Racing	(New Zealand) Earl Bamber (New Zealand) Scott Dixon (Netherlands) Renger van der Zande	Cadillac DPi-V.R	409	+1 Lap
5	DPi	01	(United States) Cadillac Chip Ganassi Racing	(New Zealand) Earl Bamber (New Zealand) Scott Dixon (Netherlands) Renger van der Zande	Cadillac 5.5 L V8	409	+1 Lap
6	**LMP2**	**8**	**(United Kingdom) Tower Motorsports by Starworks**	**(France) Gabriel Aubry (Canada) John Farano (United States) James French**	**Oreca 07**	**407**	**+3 Laps‡**
6	**LMP2**	**8**	**(United Kingdom) Tower Motorsports by Starworks**	**(France) Gabriel Aubry (Canada) John Farano (United States) James French**	**Gibson Technology GK428 V8**	**407**	**+3 Laps‡**
7	LMP2	52	(United States) PR1/Mathiasen Motorsports	(United States) Scott Huffaker (Denmark) Mikkel Jensen (United States) Ben Keating	Oreca 07	407	+3 Laps
7	LMP2	52	(United States) PR1/Mathiasen Motorsports	(United States) Scott Huffaker (Denmark) Mikkel Jensen (United States) Ben Keating	Gibson Technology GK428 V8	407	+3 Laps
8	LMP2	11	(United States) WIN Autosport	(United States) Thomas Merrill (United States) Tristan Nunez (United States) Steven Thomas	Oreca 07	406	+4 Laps
8	LMP2	11	(United States) WIN Autosport	(United States) Thomas Merrill (United States) Tristan Nunez (United States) Steven Thomas	Gibson Technology GK428 V8	406	+4 Laps
9	LMP2	22	(United Kingdom) United Autosports	(United Kingdom) Wayne Boyd (United States) James McGuire (United Kingdom) Guy Smith	Oreca 07	405	+5 Laps
9	LMP2	22	(United Kingdom) United Autosports	(United Kingdom) Wayne Boyd (United States) James McGuire (United Kingdom) Guy Smith	Gibson Technology GK428 V8	405	+5 Laps
10	DPi	60	(United States) Meyer Shank Racing w/ Curb-Agajanian	(United States) Dane Cameron (Brazil) Hélio Castroneves (Colombia) Juan Pablo Montoya	Acura ARX-05	399	+11 Laps
10	DPi	60	(United States) Meyer Shank Racing w/ Curb-Agajanian	(United States) Dane Cameron (Brazil) Hélio Castroneves (Colombia) Juan Pablo Montoya	Acura AR35TT 3.5 L Turbo V6	399	+11 Laps
11	**LMP3**	**74**	**(United States) Riley Motorsports**	**(Australia) Scott Andrews (Brazil) Felipe Fraga (United States) Gar Robinson**	**Ligier JS P320**	**391**	**+19 Laps‡**
11	**LMP3**	**74**	**(United States) Riley Motorsports**	**(Australia) Scott Andrews (Brazil) Felipe Fraga (United States) Gar Robinson**	**Nissan VK56DE 5.6 L V8**	**391**	**+19 Laps‡**
12	LMP3	30	(United States) Jr III Motorsports	(United States) Ari Balogh (Canada) Garett Grist (United States) Spencer Pigot	Ligier JS P320	390	+20 Laps
12	LMP3	30	(United States) Jr III Motorsports	(United States) Ari Balogh (Canada) Garett Grist (United States) Spencer Pigot	Nissan VK56DE 5.6 L V8	390	+20 Laps
13	**GTLM**	**79**	**(United States) WeatherTech Racing**	**(Australia) Matt Campbell (France) Mathieu Jaminet (United States) Cooper MacNeil**	**Porsche 911 RSR-19**	**390**	**+20 Laps‡**
13	**GTLM**	**79**	**(United States) WeatherTech Racing**	**(Australia) Matt Campbell (France) Mathieu Jaminet (United States) Cooper MacNeil**	**Porsche 4.2 L Flat-6**	**390**	**+20 Laps‡**
14	GTLM	97	(United States) WeatherTech Racing	(Denmark) Michael Christensen (France) Kévin Estre (France) Frédéric Makowiecki	Porsche 911 RSR-19	390	+20 Laps
14	GTLM	97	(United States) WeatherTech Racing	(Denmark) Michael Christensen (France) Kévin Estre (France) Frédéric Makowiecki	Porsche 4.2 L Flat-6	390	+20 Laps
15	GTLM	24	(United States) BMW Team RLL	(United States) John Edwards (Brazil) Augusto Farfus (Finland) Jesse Krohn	BMW M8 GTE	389	+21 Laps
15	GTLM	24	(United States) BMW Team RLL	(United States) John Edwards (Brazil) Augusto Farfus (Finland) Jesse Krohn	BMW S63 4.0 L Turbo V8	389	+21 Laps
16	LMP3	91	(United States) Riley Motorsports	(Netherlands) Jeroen Bleekemolen (United States) Jim Cox (United States) Dylan Murray	Ligier JS P320	387	+23 Laps
16	LMP3	91	(United States) Riley Motorsports	(Netherlands) Jeroen Bleekemolen (United States) Jim Cox (United States) Dylan Murray	Nissan VK56DE 5.6 L V8	387	+23 Laps
17 DNF	GTLM	4	(United States) Corvette Racing	(United States) Tommy Milner (United Kingdom) Alexander Sims (United Kingdom) Nick Tandy	Chevrolet Corvette C8.R	381	Collision damage
17 DNF	GTLM	4	(United States) Corvette Racing	(United States) Tommy Milner (United Kingdom) Alexander Sims (United Kingdom) Nick Tandy	Chevrolet 5.5 L V8	381	Collision damage
18	LMP3	40	(United States) FastMD Racing	(United States) Todd Archer (United States) Max Hanratty (Canada) James Vance	Duqueine M30 - D08	381	+29 Laps
18	LMP3	40	(United States) FastMD Racing	(United States) Todd Archer (United States) Max Hanratty (Canada) James Vance	Nissan VK56DE 5.6 L V8	381	+29 Laps
19	**GTD**	**23**	**(United States) Heart of Racing Team**	**(Canada) Roman De Angelis (United Kingdom) Ross Gunn (United Kingdom) Ian James**	**Aston Martin Vantage AMR GT3**	**378**	**+32 Laps‡**
19	**GTD**	**23**	**(United States) Heart of Racing Team**	**(Canada) Roman De Angelis (United Kingdom) Ross Gunn (United Kingdom) Ian James**	**Aston Martin 4.0 L Turbo V8**	**378**	**+32 Laps‡**
20	GTD	9	(Canada) Pfaff Motorsports	(Germany) Lars Kern (Canada) Zacharie Robichon (Belgium) Laurens Vanthoor	Porsche 911 GT3 R	378	+32 Laps
20	GTD	9	(Canada) Pfaff Motorsports	(Germany) Lars Kern (Canada) Zacharie Robichon (Belgium) Laurens Vanthoor	Porsche 4.0 L Flat-6	378	+32 Laps
21	GTD	12	(United States) Vasser Sullivan Racing	(United States) Robert Megennis (United States) Frankie Montecalvo (United States) Zach Veach	Lexus RC F GT3	377	+33 Laps
21	GTD	12	(United States) Vasser Sullivan Racing	(United States) Robert Megennis (United States) Frankie Montecalvo (United States) Zach Veach	Toyota 2UR 5.0 L V8	377	+33 Laps
22	GTD	28	(United States) Alegra Motorsports	(United States) Michael de Quesada (Spain) Daniel Juncadella (Canada) Daniel Morad	Mercedes-AMG GT3 Evo	377	+33 Laps
22	GTD	28	(United States) Alegra Motorsports	(United States) Michael de Quesada (Spain) Daniel Juncadella (Canada) Daniel Morad	Mercedes-AMG M159 6.2 L V8	377	+33 Laps
23	GTD	16	(United States) Wright Motorsports	(Belgium) Jan Heylen (United States) Trent Hindman (United States) Patrick Long	Porsche 911 GT3 R	376	+34 Laps
23	GTD	16	(United States) Wright Motorsports	(Belgium) Jan Heylen (United States) Trent Hindman (United States) Patrick Long	Porsche 4.0 L Flat-6	376	+34 Laps
24	GTD	44	(United States) Magnus Racing w/ Archangel Motorsports	(United States) Andy Lally (United States) John Potter (United States) Spencer Pumpelly	Acura NSX GT3 Evo	376	+34 Laps
24	GTD	44	(United States) Magnus Racing w/ Archangel Motorsports	(United States) Andy Lally (United States) John Potter (United States) Spencer Pumpelly	Acura 3.5 L Turbo V6	376	+34 Laps
25	GTD	1	(United States) Paul Miller Racing	(United States) Corey Lewis (United States) Bryan Sellers (United States) Madison Snow	Lamborghini Huracán GT3 Evo	365	+45 Laps
25	GTD	1	(United States) Paul Miller Racing	(United States) Corey Lewis (United States) Bryan Sellers (United States) Madison Snow	Lamborghini 5.2 L V10	365	+45 Laps
26	GTD	88	(United States) Team Hardpoint	(United States) Andrew Davis (United States) Rob Ferriol (United Kingdom) Katherine Legge	Porsche 911 GT3 R	359	+51 Laps
26	GTD	88	(United States) Team Hardpoint	(United States) Andrew Davis (United States) Rob Ferriol (United Kingdom) Katherine Legge	Porsche 4.0 L Flat-6	359	+51 Laps
27	LMP3	7	(United States) Forty7 Motorsports	(United States) Mark Kvamme (Peru) Rodrigo Pflucker (Canada) Stefan Rzadzinski	Duqueine M30 - D08	356	+54 Laps
27	LMP3	7	(United States) Forty7 Motorsports	(United States) Mark Kvamme (Peru) Rodrigo Pflucker (Canada) Stefan Rzadzinski	Nissan VK56DE 5.6 L V8	356	+54 Laps
28 DNF	DPi	5	(United States) JDC-Mustang Sampling Racing	(France) Sébastien Bourdais (France) Loïc Duval (France) Tristan Vautier	Cadillac DPi-V.R	341	Gearbox
28 DNF	DPi	5	(United States) JDC-Mustang Sampling Racing	(France) Sébastien Bourdais (France) Loïc Duval (France) Tristan Vautier	Cadillac 5.5 L V8	341	Gearbox
29	LMP3	2	(United Kingdom) United Autosports	(United Kingdom) Tom Gamble (Germany) Niklas Krütten (United Kingdom) Andy Meyrick	Ligier JS P320	308	+102 Laps
29	LMP3	2	(United Kingdom) United Autosports	(United Kingdom) Tom Gamble (Germany) Niklas Krütten (United Kingdom) Andy Meyrick	Nissan VK56DE 5.6 L V8	308	+102 Laps
30	GTD	42	(United States) NTE Sport	(United States) Jaden Conwright (Chile) Benjamín Hites (United States) Don Yount	Audi R8 LMS Evo	286	+124 Laps
30	GTD	42	(United States) NTE Sport	(United States) Jaden Conwright (Chile) Benjamín Hites (United States) Don Yount	Audi 5.2 L V10	286	+124 Laps
31 DNF	LMP3	54	(United States) CORE Autosport	(United States) Jon Bennett (United States) Colin Braun (United States) George Kurtz	Ligier JS P320	285	Fuel pressure
31 DNF	LMP3	54	(United States) CORE Autosport	(United States) Jon Bennett (United States) Colin Braun (United States) George Kurtz	Nissan VK56DE 5.6 L V8	285	Fuel pressure
32 DNF	GTLM	25	(United States) BMW Team RLL	(United States) Connor De Phillippi (Austria) Philipp Eng (Canada) Bruno Spengler	BMW M8 GTE	281	Accident
32 DNF	GTLM	25	(United States) BMW Team RLL	(United States) Connor De Phillippi (Austria) Philipp Eng (Canada) Bruno Spengler	BMW S63 4.0 L Turbo V8	281	Accident
33 DNF	LMP3	83	(United States) WIN Autosport	(United Kingdom) Matthew Bell (United States) Naveen Rao (United Kingdom) Josh Skelton	Duqueine M30 - D08	244	Driveshaft
33 DNF	LMP3	83	(United States) WIN Autosport	(United Kingdom) Matthew Bell (United States) Naveen Rao (United Kingdom) Josh Skelton	Nissan VK56DE 5.6 L V8	244	Driveshaft
34 DNF	LMP3	38	(United States) Performance Tech Motorsports	(United States) Dan Goldburg (Denmark) Malthe Jakobsen (Sweden) Rasmus Lindh	Ligier JS P320	208	Electronics
34 DNF	LMP3	38	(United States) Performance Tech Motorsports	(United States) Dan Goldburg (Denmark) Malthe Jakobsen (Sweden) Rasmus Lindh	Nissan VK56DE 5.6 L V8	208	Electronics
35 DNF	LMP3	36	(United States) Andretti Autosport	(United States) Jarett Andretti (United States) Oliver Askew (Australia) Josh Burdon	Ligier JS P320	153	Mechanical
35 DNF	LMP3	36	(United States) Andretti Autosport	(United States) Jarett Andretti (United States) Oliver Askew (Australia) Josh Burdon	Nissan VK56DE 5.6 L V8	153	Mechanical
36 DNF	GTLM	3	(United States) Corvette Racing	(Netherlands) Nicky Catsburg (Spain) Antonio García (United States) Jordan Taylor	Chevrolet Corvette C8.R	150	Accident
36 DNF	GTLM	3	(United States) Corvette Racing	(Netherlands) Nicky Catsburg (Spain) Antonio García (United States) Jordan Taylor	Chevrolet 5.5 L V8	150	Accident
37 DNF	GTD	96	(United States) Turner Motorsport	(United States) Bill Auberlen (United States) Robby Foley (Australia) Aiden Read	BMW M6 GT3	150	Accident
37 DNF	GTD	96	(United States) Turner Motorsport	(United States) Bill Auberlen (United States) Robby Foley (Australia) Aiden Read	BMW 4.4 L Turbo V8	150	Accident
38 DNF	GTD	57	(United States) HTP Winward Racing	(United Kingdom) Philip Ellis (Germany) Maro Engel (United States) Russell Ward	Mercedes-AMG GT3 Evo	147	Accident
38 DNF	GTD	57	(United States) HTP Winward Racing	(United Kingdom) Philip Ellis (Germany) Maro Engel (United States) Russell Ward	Mercedes-AMG M159 6.2 L V8	147	Accident
39 DNF	GTD	70	(United Kingdom) Inception Racing w/ Optimum Motorsport	(United Kingdom) Ben Barnicoat (United States) Brendan Iribe (Denmark) Frederik Schandorff	McLaren 720S GT3	146	Accident
39 DNF	GTD	70	(United Kingdom) Inception Racing w/ Optimum Motorsport	(United Kingdom) Ben Barnicoat (United States) Brendan Iribe (Denmark) Frederik Schandorff	McLaren M840T 4.0 L Turbo V8	146	Accident
40 DNF	GTD	19	(Austria) GRT Grasser Racing Team	(Italy) Michele Beretta (Canada) Misha Goikhberg (France) Franck Perera	Lamborghini Huracán GT3 Evo	146	Accident
40 DNF	GTD	19	(Austria) GRT Grasser Racing Team	(Italy) Michele Beretta (Canada) Misha Goikhberg (France) Franck Perera	Lamborghini 5.2 L V10	146	Accident
41 DNF	GTD	32	(United States) Gilbert Korthoff Motorsports	(United States) Guy Cosmo (United Kingdom) Stevan McAleer (United States) Mike Skeen	Mercedes-AMG GT3	146	Accident
41 DNF	GTD	32	(United States) Gilbert Korthoff Motorsports	(United States) Guy Cosmo (United Kingdom) Stevan McAleer (United States) Mike Skeen	Mercedes-AMG M159 6.2 L V8	146	Accident
42 DNF	GTD	14	(United States) Vasser Sullivan Racing	(United Kingdom) Jack Hawksworth (United States) Kyle Kirkwood (United States) Aaron Telitz	Lexus RC F GT3	146	Accident
42 DNF	GTD	14	(United States) Vasser Sullivan Racing	(United Kingdom) Jack Hawksworth (United States) Kyle Kirkwood (United States) Aaron Telitz	Toyota 2UR 5.0 L V8	146	Accident
43 DNF	LMP2	18	(United States) Era Motorsport	(United Kingdom) Ryan Dalziel (United States) Dwight Merriman (United Kingdom) Kyle Tilley	Oreca 07	21	Accident
43 DNF	LMP2	18	(United States) Era Motorsport	(United Kingdom) Ryan Dalziel (United States) Dwight Merriman (United Kingdom) Kyle Tilley	Gibson Technology GK428 V8	21	Accident

== Standings after the race ==
DPi Drivers' Championship standings
Pos.	+/–	Driver	Points
1	1	(Brazil) Pipo Derani (Brazil) Felipe Nasr	3407
2	1	(Portugal) Filipe Albuquerque (United States) Ricky Taylor	3396
3		(United Kingdom) Oliver Jarvis (United Kingdom) Harry Tincknell	3264
4		(Netherlands) Renger van der Zande	3163
5		(United States) Dane Cameron	2946

LMP2 Drivers' Championship standings
Pos.	+/–	Driver	Points
1		(Denmark) Mikkel Jensen (United States) Ben Keating	2162
2		(United States) Tristan Nunez (United States) Steven Thomas	2026
3		(France) Gabriel Aubry (Canada) John Farano	2012
4		(United Kingdom) Ryan Dalziel (United States) Dwight Merriman	1620
5		(United States) Scott Huffaker	1057

LMP3 Drivers' Championship standings
Pos.	+/–	Driver	Points
1		(United States) Gar Robinson	2176
2		(United States) Jon Bennett (United States) Colin Braun	1990
3		(United States) Jim Cox (United States) Dylan Murry	1922
4	2	(Brazil) Felipe Fraga	1846
5	1	(Sweden) Rasmus Lindh	1790

GTLM Drivers' Championship standings
Pos.	+/–	Driver	Points
1		(Spain) Antonio García (United States) Jordan Taylor	3549
2		(United States) Tommy Milner (United Kingdom) Nick Tandy	3448
3		(United States) Cooper MacNeil	3356
4		(Australia) Matt Campbell	2084
5		(France) Mathieu Jaminet	1706

GTD Drivers' Championship standings
Pos.	+/–	Driver	Points
1		(Canada) Zacharie Robichon (Belgium) Laurens Vanthoor	3284
2		(United States) Madison Snow (United States) Bryan Sellers	3163
3		(Canada) Roman De Angelis (United Kingdom) Ross Gunn	3111
4		(United States) Patrick Long	2943
5		(United States) Bill Auberlen (United States) Robby Foley	2880

- Note: Only the top five positions are included for all sets of standings.

DPi Teams' Championship standings
Pos.	+/–	Team	Points
1	1	(United States) #31 Whelen Engineering Racing	3407
2	1	(United States) #10 WTR-Konica Minolta Acura	3396
3		(Canada) #55 Mazda Motorsports	3264
4		(United States) #01 Cadillac Chip Ganassi Racing	3163
5		(United States) #60 Meyer Shank Racing w/ Curb-Agajanian	2946

LMP2 Teams' Championship standings
Pos.	+/–	Team	Points
1		(United States) #52 PR1 Mathiasen Motorsports	2162
2		(United States) #11 WIN Autosport	2026
3		(United States) #8 Tower Motorsport	2012
4		(United States) #18 Era Motorsport	1620
5		(United States) #22 United Autosports	920

LMP3 Teams' Championship standings
Pos.	+/–	Team	Points
1		(United States) #74 Riley Motorsports	2176
2		(United States) #54 CORE Autosport	1990
3		(United States) #91 Riley Motorsports	1922
4		(United States) #38 Performance Tech Motorsports	1790
5		(United States) #36 Andretti Autosport	1432

GTLM Teams' Championship standings
Pos.	+/–	Team	Points
1		(United States) #3 Corvette Racing	3549
2		(United States) #4 Corvette Racing	3448
3		(United States) #79 WeatherTech Racing	3356
4		(United States) #24 BMW Team RLL	1336
5		(United States) #25 BMW Team RLL	1251

GTD Teams' Championship standings
Pos.	+/–	Team	Points
1		(Canada) #9 Pfaff Motorsports	3284
2		(United States) #1 Paul Miller Racing	3163
3		(United States) #23 Heart of Racing Team	3111
4		(United States) #16 Wright Motorsports	2943
5		(United States) #96 Turner Motorsport	2880

- Note: Only the top five positions are included for all sets of standings.

DPi Manufacturers' Championship standings
Pos.	+/–	Manufacturer	Points
1		(United States) Cadillac	3666
2		(Japan) Acura	3553
3		(Japan) Mazda	3421

GTLM Manufacturers' Championship standings
Pos.	+/–	Manufacturer	Points
1		(United States) Chevrolet	3715
2		(Germany) Porsche	3546
3		(Germany) BMW	1407
4		(Italy) Ferrari	330

GTD Manufacturers' Championship standings
Pos.	+/–	Manufacturer	Points
1		(Germany) Porsche	3425
2		(Italy) Lamborghini	3290
3		(United Kingdom) Aston Martin	3239
4	1	(Japan) Lexus	3129
5	1	(Germany) BMW	3089

- Note: Only the top five positions are included for all sets of standings.

IMSA SportsCar Championship
Previous race: 2021 GT Challenge at VIR	2021 season	Next race: None
