= 2017 Race of Champions =

Motor racing competition

Layout of 2017 Race of Champions

The 2017 Race of Champions was the 28th running of the event, and took place over 21–22 January 2017 at Marlins Park baseball stadium in Miami. Juan Pablo Montoya took the Championship and became the champion for the first time. Sebastian Vettel, after teammate Pascal Wehrlein was sidelined after a crash, single-handedly won the Nations' Cup for Germany.

== Participants ==
Nations' Cup team	Drivers	2016 series
Colombia	Gabby Chaves	IndyCar Series, WeatherTech SportsCar Championship
Colombia	Juan Pablo Montoya	IndyCar Series
Brazil	Tony Kanaan	IndyCar Series, WeatherTech SportsCar Championship
Brazil	Felipe Massa	Formula One
Germany	Sebastian Vettel	Formula One
Germany	Pascal Wehrlein	Formula One
ROC Factor Latin America	(Brazil) Hélio Castroneves	IndyCar Series
ROC Factor Latin America	(Argentina) Gabriel Glusman (Note: They were elected by the general vote on ROC Facebook.)	none
Nordic	(Denmark) Tom Kristensen	none
Nordic	(Norway) Petter Solberg	World Rallycross Championship
ROC Factor Canada	James Hinchcliffe	IndyCar Series
ROC Factor Canada	Stefan Rzadzinski	Nissan Micra Cup
United Kingdom	Jenson Button	Formula One
United Kingdom	David Coulthard	none
(United States) Team USA IndyCar	Ryan Hunter-Reay	IndyCar Series
(United States) Team USA IndyCar	Alexander Rossi	IndyCar Series
(United States) Team USA NASCAR	Kurt Busch	NASCAR Sprint Cup
(United States) Team USA NASCAR	Kyle Busch	NASCAR Sprint Cup, NASCAR Xfinity Series
(United States) Team USA Rally X	Travis Pastrana	Rally America
(United States) Team USA Rally X	Scott Speed	Global RallyCross Championship, Audi Sport TT Cup

== Nations' Cup ==
There were three groups of uneven size, with a format which ensured North American participation in the final.

The top two teams from Group A (USA/Canada) would progress to Semi-Final A, with the winners of Groups B (Europe) and C (South America) progressing to Semi-Final B; the winners of the two Semi-Finals would face off in the final.

=== Group stage ===
==== Group A ====
Pos.	Team	Wins	Losses	Time
1	(United States) USA IndyCar	4	2	1:15.7969
2	(United States) USA NASCAR	4	2	1:16.2932
3	ROC Factor Canada	3	3	1:17.4019
4	(United States) USA RallyX	1	5	1:15.8272

==== Group B ====
Pos.	Team	Wins	Losses	Time
1	Germany	4	0	
	(United Kingdom) Great Britain			
	Nordic			

==== Group C ====
Pos.	Team	Wins	Losses	Time
1	Colombia	2	2	
	Brazil	2	2	
	ROC Factor Latin America	2	2	

=== Knockout stage ===
Semi-finals
(United States) USA IndyCar	1
(United States) USA NASCAR	2
Germany	2
Colombia	0

Final
(United States) USA NASCAR	0
Germany	2

== Race of Champions ==
=== Group stage ===
==== Group A ====
Pos.	Team	Wins	Losses	Best Time
1	(United States) Travis Pastrana	3	0	0:37.7393
2	(Brazil) Hélio Castroneves	2	1	0:37.2688
3	(Germany) Sebastian Vettel	1	2	0:37.6493
4	(United States) Alexander Rossi	0	3	0:37.7898

==== Group B ====
Pos.	Team	Wins	Losses	Best Time
1	(Colombia) Juan Pablo Montoya	2	1	0:37.3303
2	(Brazil) Felipe Massa	2	1	0:37.6360
3	(Germany) Pascal Wehrlein	1	2	0:36.6564
4	(Norway) Petter Solberg	1	2	0:36.9282

==== Group C ====
Pos.	Team	Wins	Losses	Best Time
1	(United Kingdom) Jenson Button	3	0	0:38.6742
2	(United States) Kyle Busch	2	1	0:38.7193
3	(Brazil) Tony Kanaan	1	2	0:38.6410
4	(Canada) James Hinchcliffe	0	3	0:39.0259

==== Group D ====
Pos.	Team	Wins	Losses	Best Time
1	(United Kingdom) David Coulthard	3	0	0:38.4466
2	(Denmark) Tom Kristensen	2	1	0:38.3756
3	(United States) Kurt Busch	1	2	0:38.4182
4	(United States) Ryan Hunter-Reay	0	3	0:39.8681

=== Knockout stage ===
Quarterfinals
(United States) Travis Pastrana	0
(Colombia) Juan Pablo Montoya	2
(Brazil) Felipe Massa	2
(Brazil) Hélio Castroneves	0
(United Kingdom) Jenson Button	1
(Denmark) Tom Kristensen	2
(United Kingdom) David Coulthard	2
(United States) Kyle Busch	0

Semifinals
(Colombia) Juan Pablo Montoya	2
(Brazil) Felipe Massa	0
(Denmark) Tom Kristensen	2
(United Kingdom) David Coulthard	0

Final
(Colombia) Juan Pablo Montoya	2
(Denmark) Tom Kristensen	0
