= 2024 Porsche Carrera Cup Asia =

One-make sports car racing championship

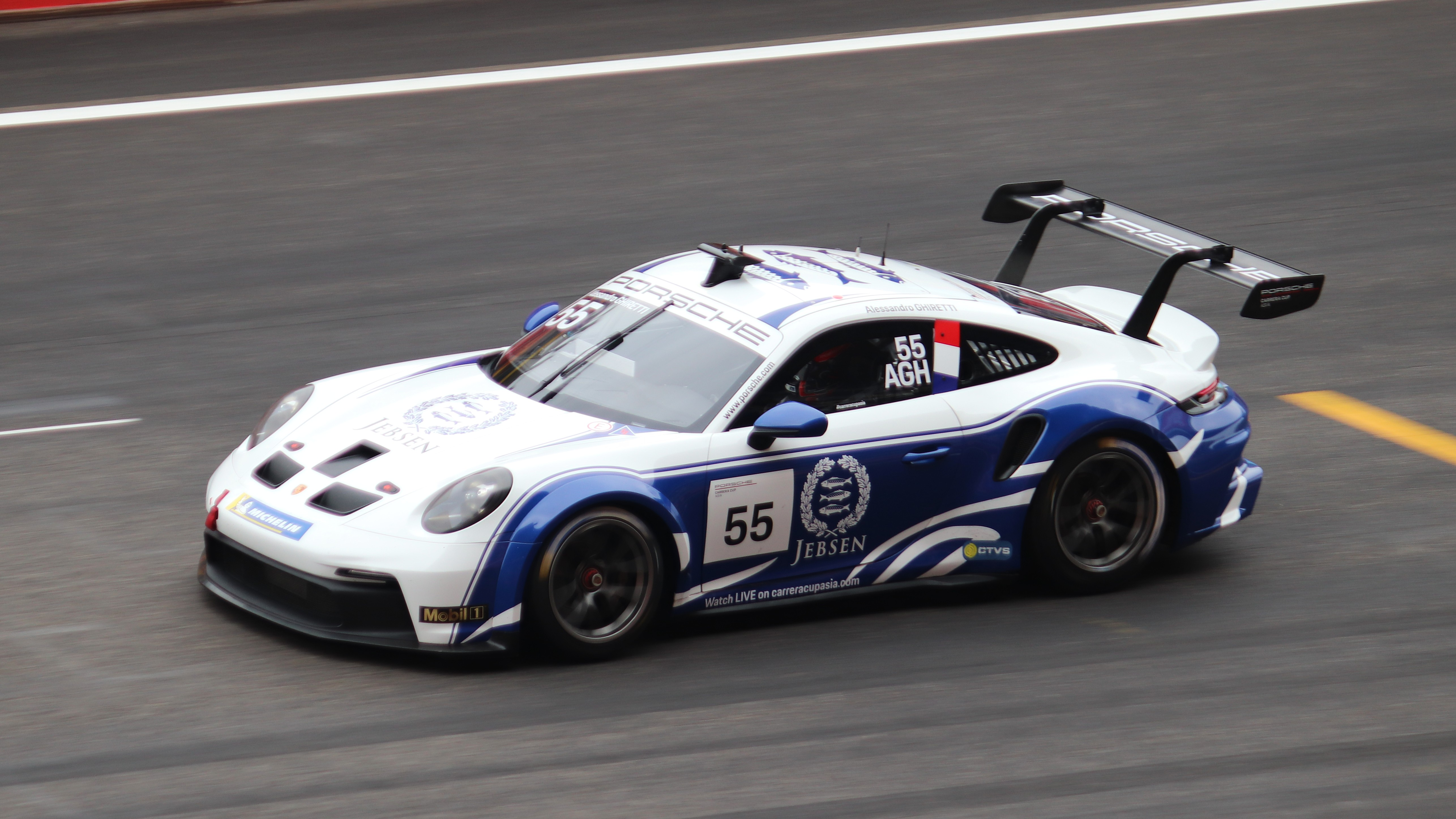
Alessandro Ghiretti won the Drivers' Championship driving for Team Jebsen.

The 2024 Porsche Carrera Cup Asia was the twenty-first season of the Porsche Carrera Cup Asia. The season commenced on 19 April at the Shanghai International Circuit, and concluded at the same venue on 27 October.

== Calendar ==
| Round | Circuit | Date | Supporting |
|---|---|---|---|
| 1 | (China) Shanghai International Circuit, Jiading District | 19–21 April | Formula One World Championship; F4 Chinese Championship |
| 2 | (Japan) Suzuka International Racing Course, Suzuka | 10–12 May | Suzuka Clubman Race |
| 3 | (Thailand) Chang International Circuit, Buriram | 14–15 June | Stand-alone event |
| 4 | (Thailand) Bangsaen Street Circuit, Chonburi | 5–7 July | Bangsaen Grand Prix |
| 5 | (Malaysia) Sepang International Circuit, Sepang | 9–11 August | Thailand Super Series; Malaysia Championship Series |
| 6 | Marina Bay Street Circuit, Singapore | 20–22 September | Formula One World Championship; F1 Academy |
| 7 | (China) Shanghai International Circuit, Jiading District | 25–27 October | Porsche Sports Cup China |

== Entry list ==
| Team | No. | Driver | Class | Rounds |
|---|---|---|---|---|
| (China) Z.SPEED Motorsport | 3 | (Macau) Liu Lic Ka | Am | 7 |
| (China) Z.SPEED Motorsport | 22 | (China) Hu Bo | Am | 1, 7 |
| (China) Z.SPEED Motorsport | 22 | (China) Xu Zhefeng | Am | 2 |
| (China) Z.SPEED Motorsport | 75 | (China) Xu Zhefeng | Am | 3–5 |
| (China) Z.SPEED Motorsport | 321 | (China) Li Xuanyu | PA | All |
| (China) / Team Shanghai Yonda BWT; (China) / Phantom Global Racing; (China) / Phantom Global Racing Luanzhou International Circuit; (China) / Team Betterlife | 5 | (Luxembourg) Dylan Pereira | P | All |
| (China) / Team Shanghai Yonda BWT; (China) / Phantom Global Racing; (China) / Phantom Global Racing Luanzhou International Circuit; (China) / Team Betterlife | 6 | (China) Dylan Yip | P | All |
| (China) / Team Shanghai Yonda BWT; (China) / Phantom Global Racing; (China) / Phantom Global Racing Luanzhou International Circuit; (China) / Team Betterlife | 7 | (China) Bao Jinlong | PA | All |
| (China) / Team Shanghai Yonda BWT; (China) / Phantom Global Racing; (China) / Phantom Global Racing Luanzhou International Circuit; (China) / Team Betterlife | 9 | (China) Li Chao | PA | All |
| (China) / Team Shanghai Yonda BWT; (China) / Phantom Global Racing; (China) / Phantom Global Racing Luanzhou International Circuit; (China) / Team Betterlife | 117 | (Philippines) Cao Qikuan (Note: Cao is a Chinese driver competing under a Filipino license.) | Am | All |
| (China) / Team Shanghai Yonda BWT; (China) / Phantom Global Racing; (China) / Phantom Global Racing Luanzhou International Circuit; (China) / Team Betterlife | 888 | (China) Zhang Yaqi | PA | 1–6 |
| (China) / Team Shanghai Yonda BWT; (China) / Phantom Global Racing; (China) / Phantom Global Racing Luanzhou International Circuit; (China) / Team Betterlife | 888 | (China) Yan Chuang | Am | 7 |
| (Hong Kong) / Modena Motorsports (Note: Car No. 16 entered as Modena Motorsports, and car No. 69 entered as OpenRoad Racing); (Hong Kong) / OpenRoad Racing | 16 | (Hong Kong) John Shen | Am | All |
| (Hong Kong) / Modena Motorsports; (Hong Kong) / OpenRoad Racing | 69 | (Hong Kong) Angelo Negro (Note: Negro is an Italian driver competing under a Hong Kong license.) | PA | 1 |
| (Hong Kong) / Modena Motorsports; (Hong Kong) / OpenRoad Racing | 69 | (Canada) Stefan Rzadzinski | P | 2 |
| (Hong Kong) / Modena Motorsports; (Hong Kong) / OpenRoad Racing | 69 | (Canada) Christian Chia | Am | 3–7 |
| (New Zealand) / Sime Motors Racing (Note: Car No. 84 entered as Team Porsche New Zealand, car No. 17 entered as Sime Darby Racing Team, car and No. 20, 61 & No. 76 entered as EBM Giga Racing.); (New Zealand) / EBM Giga Racing; (New Zealand) / Team Porsche New Zealand | 17 | (Malaysia) Nazim Azman | P | All |
| (New Zealand) / Sime Motors Racing; (New Zealand) / EBM Giga Racing; (New Zealand) / Team Porsche New Zealand | 20 | (China) Lu Wenlong | P | 5 |
| (New Zealand) / Sime Motors Racing; (New Zealand) / EBM Giga Racing; (New Zealand) / Team Porsche New Zealand | 61 | (Australia) Oscar Targett | P | 1 |
| (New Zealand) / Sime Motors Racing; (New Zealand) / EBM Giga Racing; (New Zealand) / Team Porsche New Zealand | 61 | (Malaysia) Adrian D'Silva | Am | 2–7 |
| (New Zealand) / Sime Motors Racing; (New Zealand) / EBM Giga Racing; (New Zealand) / Team Porsche New Zealand | 76 | (Thailand) Munkong Sathienthirakul | Am | All |
| (New Zealand) / Sime Motors Racing; (New Zealand) / EBM Giga Racing; (New Zealand) / Team Porsche New Zealand | 84 | (New Zealand) Zac Stichbury | P | 1, 3 |
| (New Zealand) / Sime Motors Racing; (New Zealand) / EBM Giga Racing; (New Zealand) / Team Porsche New Zealand | 84 | (New Zealand) Marco Giltrap | P | 2, 4–6 |
| (New Zealand) / Sime Motors Racing; (New Zealand) / EBM Giga Racing; (New Zealand) / Team Porsche New Zealand | 84 | (New Zealand) Brock Gilchrist | P | 7 |
| (China) R&B Racing | 18 | (Mozambique) Rodrigo Dias Almeida | P | All |
| (China) R&B Racing | 33 | (China) Zhu Zhiyao | Am | 1–2, 6 |
| (China) R&B Racing | 33 | (Hong Kong) Liu Kai Shun | PA | 4–5 |
| (China) R&B Racing | 33 | (China) Lu Wei | PA | 7 |
| (China) R&B Racing | 33 | (China) Ling Kang | P | 3 |
| (China) R&B Racing | 98 | (China) Ling Kang | P | 1 |
| (China) R&B Racing | 98 | (Macau) Max Yao (Note: Yao and Lu are Chinese drivers competing under a Macanese license.) | Am | 2–6 |
| (China) R&B Racing | 98 | (China) Yang Ruoyu | PA | 7 |
| (China) R&B Racing | 777 | (Macau) Lu Zhiwei | Am | All |
| Trans-China Automotive Racing | 21 | (Netherlands) Francis Tjia | PA | 1–2, 4, 7 |
| Trans-China Automotive Racing | 21 | (China) Li Zhicong | PA | 3 |
| Trans-China Automotive Racing | 21 | (Hong Kong) Harris Lee | Am' | 5 |
| Trans-China Automotive Racing | 21 | (Indonesia) Anderson Tanoto He | Am | 6 |
| Trans-China Automotive Racing | 221 | (Hong Kong) Dominic Tjia | Am | 5 |
| (Hong Kong) Bergwerk Motorsport | 23 | (Hong Kong) Eric Kwong | Am | All |
| (Hong Kong) Team Jebsen | 55 | (France) Alessandro Ghiretti | P | 1–3, 5–7 |
| (Hong Kong) Team Jebsen | 55 | (France) Florian Latorre | P | 4 |
| (China) TORO Racing | 77 | (China) Eric Zang | PA | All |
| (China) TORO Racing | 88 | (Indonesia) Hendrik Jaya Soewadty | Am | All |
| (China) TORO Racing | 99 | (France) Mathys Jaubert | P | 1–3, 5–7 |
| (China) TORO Racing | 99 | (New Zealand) Chris van der Drift | P | 4 |
| (Austria) Porsche Holding | 86 | (Austria) Martin Ragginger | P | All |
| (Hong Kong) Triple Ace Racing | 91 | (Hong Kong) Henry Kwong | Am | All |
| (China) Porsche Own Retail 69 Team | 669 | (China) Han Songting | Am | 7 |
| (China) Porsche Own Retail 69 Team | 969 | (China) Han Songting | Am | 1 |
| (China) Porsche Own Retail 69 Team | 969 | (Chinese Taipei) Jacky Wu | Am | 2–4, 7 |
| (China) Porsche Own Retail 69 Team | 969 | (China) Yang Ke | Am | 5 |
| (China) Porsche Own Retail 69 Team | 969 | (Hong Kong) Simon Chan | Am | 6 |

| Icon | Class |
|---|---|
| P | Pro Cup |
| PA | Pro-Am Cup |
| Am | Am Cup |
| | Guest drivers ineligible to score points |

== Results ==
| Round | | Circuit | Pole position | Fastest lap | Overall winner | Winning team | Pro-Am Winner | Am Winner |
|---|---|---|---|---|---|---|---|---|
| 1 | R1 | (China) Shanghai International Circuit | (Luxembourg) Dylan Pereira | (Luxembourg) Dylan Pereira | (Luxembourg) Dylan Pereira | (China) Team Shanghai Yonda BWT | (China) Bao Jinlong | (Hong Kong) Eric Kwong |
| 1 | R2 | (China) Shanghai International Circuit | | (France) Alessandro Ghiretti | (France) Alessandro Ghiretti | (Hong Kong) Team Jebsen | (China) Bao Jinlong | (Hong Kong) Eric Kwong |
| 2 | R1 | (Japan) Suzuka International Racing Course | (France) Alessandro Ghiretti | (France) Alessandro Ghiretti | (France) Alessandro Ghiretti | (Hong Kong) Team Jebsen | (China) Bao Jinlong | (Hong Kong) Eric Kwong |
| 2 | R2 | (Japan) Suzuka International Racing Course | | (France) Alessandro Ghiretti | (France) Alessandro Ghiretti | (Hong Kong) Team Jebsen | (China) Bao Jinlong | (Hong Kong) Eric Kwong |
| 3 | R1 | (Thailand) Chang International Circuit | (France) Alessandro Ghiretti | (France) Alessandro Ghiretti | (France) Alessandro Ghiretti | (Hong Kong) Team Jebsen | (China) Bao Jinlong | (Thailand) Munkong Sathienthirakul |
| 3 | R2 | (Thailand) Chang International Circuit | | (Luxembourg) Dylan Pereira | (France) Alessandro Ghiretti | (Hong Kong) Team Jebsen | (China) Li Zhicong | (Thailand) Munkong Sathienthirakul |
| 4 | R1 | (Thailand) Bangsaen Street Circuit | (New Zealand) Chris van der Drift | (Austria) Martin Ragginger | (New Zealand) Chris van der Drift | (China) TORO Racing | (China) Bao Jinlong | (Hong Kong) Eric Kwong |
| 4 | R2 | (Thailand) Bangsaen Street Circuit | | (Austria) Martin Ragginger | (France) Florian Latorre | (Hong Kong) Team Jebsen | (China) Bao Jinlong | (Thailand) Munkong Sathienthirakul |
| 5 | R1 | (Malaysia) Sepang International Circuit | (France) Mathys Jaubert | (France) Mathys Jaubert | (France) Mathys Jaubert (Note: Alessandro Ghiretti originally won the race, but later received a 10 second time penalty. Mathys Jaubert, initially classified second, thus inherited the win.) | (China) TORO Racing | (China) Bao Jinlong | (Hong Kong) Eric Kwong |
| 5 | R2 | (Malaysia) Sepang International Circuit | | (France) Mathys Jaubert | (Luxembourg) Dylan Pereira | (China) Team Shanghai Yonda BWT | (Hong Kong) Liu Kai Shun | (Thailand) Munkong Sathienthirakul |
| 5 | R3 | (Malaysia) Sepang International Circuit | | (France) Alessandro Ghiretti | (France) Alessandro Ghiretti | (Hong Kong) Team Jebsen | (Hong Kong) Liu Kai Shun | (Hong Kong) Eric Kwong |
| 6 | R1 | (Singapore) Marina Bay Street Circuit | (France) Mathys Jaubert (Note: Mathys Jaubert set the fastest time in qualifying, but received a 3 place grid penalty pre-race. Dylan Pereira, who set the second fastest time, was promoted to pole position.) | (France) Mathys Jaubert | (Luxembourg) Dylan Pereira | (China) Team Shanghai Yonda BWT | (China) Bao Jinlong | (Hong Kong) Eric Kwong |
| 6 | R2 | (Singapore) Marina Bay Street Circuit | | (France) Alessandro Ghiretti | (Luxembourg) Dylan Pereira | (China) Team Shanghai Yonda BWT | (China) Bao Jinlong | (Thailand) Munkong Sathienthirakul |
| 7 | R1 | (China) Shanghai International Circuit | (Luxembourg) Dylan Pereira | (France) Alessandro Ghiretti | (Luxembourg) Dylan Pereira | (China) Team Shanghai Yonda BWT | (China) Eric Zang | (Hong Kong) Eric Kwong |
| 7 | R2 | (China) Shanghai International Circuit | | (France) Alessandro Ghiretti | (France) Alessandro Ghiretti | (Hong Kong) Team Jebsen | (China) Bao Jinlong | (China) Hu Bo |
| 7 | R3 | (China) Shanghai International Circuit | | (France) Alessandro Ghiretti | (France) Alessandro Ghiretti | (Hong Kong) Team Jebsen | (China) Bao Jinlong | (Hong Kong) Henry Kwong |

== Championship standings ==
=== Scoring system ===
Points were awarded to the top fifteen classified drivers in every race, using the following system:

| Position | 1st | 2nd | 3rd | 4th | 5th | 6th | 7th | 8th | 9th | 10th | 11th | 12th | 13th | 14th | 15th | Pole | FL |
| Points | 25 | 20 | 17 | 14 | 12 | 10 | 9 | 8 | 7 | 6 | 5 | 4 | 3 | 2 | 1 | 1 | 1 |

=== Overall ===
| Pos. | Driver | SIC1 (China) | | SUZ (Japan) | | CHA (Thailand) | | BAN (Thailand) | | SEP (Malaysia) | | | MRN (Singapore) | | SIC2 (China) | | | Points |
| Pos. | Driver | R1 | R2 | R1 | R2 | R1 | R2 | R1 | R2 | R1 | R2 | R3 | R1 | R2 | R1 | R2 | R3 | Points |
|---|---|---|---|---|---|---|---|---|---|---|---|---|---|---|---|---|---|---|
| 1 | (France) Alessandro Ghiretti | 3 | 1 | 1 | 1 | 1 | 1 | | | 12 | 3 | 1 | 4 | 2 | 2 | 1 | 1 | 308 |
| 2 | (Luxembourg) Dylan Pereira | 1 | 6 | 2 | 2 | 3 | 2 | DNS | DNS | 16 | 1 | 6 | 1 | 1 | 1 | 2 | 3 | 268 |
| 3 | (France) Mathys Jaubert | 2 | 2 | 3 | 3 | 2 | 3 | | | 1 | 2 | 2 | 2 | 3 | 9 | 4 | 12 | 249 |
| 4 | (Austria) Martin Ragginger | 5 | 7 | 4 | 4 | 4 | Ret | 3 | 3 | Ret | 4 | 3 | 3 | 4 | 3 | 6 | 4 | 224 |
| 5 | (Mozambique) Rodrigo Dias Almeida | 7 | 4 | 5 | 5 | 6 | 5 | 4 | 4 | 3 | Ret | 14 | 6 | 5 | 6 | 7 | 8 | 188 |
| 6 | (China) Dylan Yip | 10 | 11 | 9 | 7 | 8 | 6 | 6 | 7 | 5 | 10 | 7 | 7 | 8 | 13 | 5 | 6 | 151 |
| 7 | (Malaysia) Nazim Azman | 9 | 8 | Ret | 8 | 5 | 4 | 7 | 24 | 8 | 6 | 4 | 9 | 6 | 5 | 9 | 5 | 150 |
| 8 | (China) Bao Jinlong | 8 | 3 | 6 | 10 | 9 | 14 | 8 | 5 | 4 | 22 | 12 | 8 | 7 | 10 | 8 | 7 | 147 |
| 9 | (New Zealand) Marco Giltrap | | | 7 | 6 | | | 5 | 6 | 2 | 5 | Ret | 5 | 9 | | | | 101 |
| 10 | (Thailand) Munkong Sathienthirakul | Ret | 17 | 11 | 12 | 12 | 8 | 9 | 9 | 11 | 13 | 11 | 17 | 10 | 12 | 14 | 16 | 80 |
| 11 | (Hong Kong) Eric Kwong | 14 | 14 | 10 | 11 | 13 | 12 | 11 | 16 | 10 | 14 | 10 | 13 | 11 | 11 | 20 | 21 | 76 |
| 12 | (China) Li Xuanyu | 13 | 10 | DNS | 24 | Ret | 10 | 10 | 13 | 9 | 11 | 19 | 16 | 12 | 25 | Ret | 9 | 59 |
| 13 | (China) Eric Zang | 12 | 15 | 15 | 20 | 23 | 21 | Ret | 20 | Ret | 8 | 9 | 11 | Ret | 7 | 11 | 19 | 50 |
| 14 | (China) Zhang Yaqi | 17 | 13 | 12 | Ret | 15 | Ret | Ret | 8 | 7 | 9 | Ret | 12 | 14 | | | | 48 |
| 15 | (China) Li Chao | Ret | 12 | 17 | 14 | 17 | 13 | 14 | 14 | Ret | 15 | 25 | 10 | 13 | 15 | Ret | 14 | 44 |
| 16 | (Hong Kong) Henry Kwong | 15 | 17 | 13 | 13 | 16 | 20 | 19 | 11 | 13 | 16 | 13 | 14 | 20 | 17 | 26 | 11 | 43 |
| 17 | (New Zealand) Zac Stichbury | 11 | 6 | | | 11 | 15 | | | | | | | | | | | 29 |
| 18 | (Netherlands) Francis Tjia | Ret | 16 | 14 | 16 | | | DNS | DNS | | | | | | 8 | 15 | 15 | 22 |
| 19 | (Philippines) Cao Qikuan | Ret | 18 | 16 | 17 | 18 | 11 | Ret | 12 | 15 | 21 | 23 | 22 | Ret | 24 | 18 | 20 | 19 |
| 20 | (Macau) Lu Zhiwei | 18 | Ret | 22 | 22 | 14 | 16 | Ret | 21 | Ret | 18 | 16 | 15 | 18 | DNS | 23 | 18 | 12 |
| 21 | (Hong Kong) John Shen | 19 | 23 | 19 | 19 | 24 | 24 | 15 | 15 | 17 | 23 | 27 | Ret | Ret | 19 | 16 | Ret | 11 |
| 22 | (Chinese Taipei) Jacky Wu | | | 21 | 15 | 25 | 19 | Ret | 22 | | | | | | 26 | 13 | Ret | 8 |
| 23 | (Canada) Christian Chia | | | | | 20 | 22 | 18 | 19 | 14 | 19 | 17 | DNS | 17 | 18 | 19 | 23 | 7 |
| 24 | (Indonesia) Hendrik Jaya Soewadty | Ret | 24 | 18 | 26 | 26 | 18 | 16 | 17 | 19 | 25 | 24 | 19 | Ret | 20 | 22 | 17 | 7 |
| 25 | (Macau) Max Yao | | | Ret | 21 | 19 | 25 | 13 | 23 | Ret | 20 | 21 | 18 | 16 | | | | 6 |
| 26 | (Malaysia) Adrian D'Silva | | | 20 | 18 | 21 | 23 | 17 | 25 | 21 | 24 | 15 | 21 | 19 | 21 | 21 | 25 | 5 |
| 27 | (China) Xu Zhefeng | WD | WD | Ret | 23 | 22 | 17 | Ret | 18 | 20 | 27 | 18 | DNS | WD | | | | 2 |
| 28 | (China) Zhu Zhiyao | 21 | 21 | Ret | 25 | | | | | | | | 20 | 15 | | | | 1 |
Guest drivers ineligible to score points
| - | (New Zealand) Chris van der Drift | | | | | | | 1 | 2 | | | | | | | | | - |
| - | (France) Florian Latorre | | | | | | | 2 | 1 | | | | | | | | | - |
| - | (New Zealand) Brock Gilchrist | | | | | | | | | | | | | | 4 | 3 | 2 | - |
| - | (China) Ling Kang | 4 | Ret | | | 7 | 7 | | | | | | | | | | | - |
| - | (China) Lu Wenlong | | | | | | | | | 6 | 12 | 5 | | | | | | - |
| - | (Australia) Oscar Targett | 6 | 5 | | | | | | | | | | | | | | | - |
| - | (Hong Kong) Liu Kai Shun | | | | | | | 12 | 10 | Ret | 7 | 8 | | | | | | - |
| - | (Canada) Stefan Rzadzinski | | | 8 | 9 | | | | | | | | | | | | | - |
| - | (China) Li Zhicong | | | | | 10 | 9 | | | | | | | | | | | - |
| - | (China) Yang Ruoyu | | | | | | | | | | | | | | 16 | 10 | 10 | - |
| - | (China) Hu Bo | Ret | 20 | | | | | | | | | | | | 14 | 12 | 13 | - |
| - | (Hong Kong) Angelo Negro | 16 | Ret | | | | | | | | | | | | | | | - |
| - | (Hong Kong) Harris Lee | | | | | | | | | 18 | 17 | 22 | | | | | | - |
| - | (China) Lu Wei | | | | | | | | | | | | | | 23 | 17 | Ret | - |
| - | (China) Han Songting | 20 | 22 | | | | | | | | | | | | 22 | 24 | 24 | - |
| - | (Hong Kong) Dominic Tjia | | | | | | | | | 23 | 26 | 20 | | | | | | - |
| - | (Hong Kong) Simon Chan | | | | | | | | | | | | 24 | 21 | | | | - |
| - | (China) Yan Chuang | | | | | | | | | | | | | | DNS | 25 | 22 | - |
| - | (China) Yang Ke | | | | | | | | | 22 | 28 | 26 | | | | | | - |
| - | (Indonesia) Anderson Tanoto He | | | | | | | | | | | | 25 | Ret | | | | - |
| - | (Macau) Liu Lic Ka | | | | | | | | | | | | | | 27 | Ret | 26 | - |
| Pos. | Driver | R1 | R2 | R1 | R2 | R1 | R2 | R1 | R2 | R1 | R2 | R3 | R1 | R2 | R1 | R2 | R3 | Points |
| Pos. | Driver | SIC1 (China) | | SUZ (Japan) | | CHA (Thailand) | | BAN (Thailand) | | SEP (Malaysia) | | | MRN (Singapore) | | SIC2 (China) | | | Points |

=== Pro-Am ===
| Pos. | Driver | SIC (China) | | SUZ (Japan) | | CHA (Thailand) | | BAN (Thailand) | | SEP (Malaysia) | | | MRN (Singapore) | | SIC (China) | | | Points |
| Pos. | Driver | R1 | R2 | R1 | R2 | R1 | R2 | R1 | R2 | R1 | R2 | R3 | R1 | R2 | R1 | R2 | R3 | Points |
|---|---|---|---|---|---|---|---|---|---|---|---|---|---|---|---|---|---|---|
| 1 | (China) Bao Jinlong | 1 | 1 | 1 | 1 | 1 | 4 | 1 | 1 | | | | | | | | | 204 |
| 2 | (China) Li Chao | Ret | 3 | 5 | 2 | 4 | 3 | 4 | 5 | | | | | | | | | 117 |
| 3 | (China) Li Xuanyu | 3 | 2 | DNS | 5 | Ret | 2 | 2 | 4 | | | | | | | | | 111 |
| 4 | (China) Eric Zang | 2 | 5 | 4 | 4 | 5 | 5 | Ret | 6 | | | | | | | | | 101 |
| 5 | (China) Zhang Yaqi | 4 | 4 | 2 | Ret | 3 | Ret | Ret | 2 | | | | | | | | | 89 |
| 6 | (Netherlands) Francis Tjia | Ret | 6 | 3 | 3 | | | DNS | DNS | | | | | | | | | 44 |
Guest drivers ineligible to score points
| — | (China) Li Zhicong | | | | | 2 | 1 | | | | | | | | | | | — |
| — | (Hong Kong) Liu Kai Shun | | | | | | | 3 | 3 | | | | | | | | | — |
| Pos. | Driver | R1 | R2 | R1 | R2 | R1 | R2 | R1 | R2 | R1 | R2 | R3 | R1 | R2 | R1 | R2 | R3 | Points |
| Pos. | Driver | SIC (China) | | SUZ (Japan) | | CHA (Thailand) | | BAN (Thailand) | | SEP (Malaysia) | | | MRN (Singapore) | | SIC (China) | | | Points |

=== Am ===
| Pos. | Driver | SIC (China) | | SUZ (Japan) | | CHA (Thailand) | | BAN (Thailand) | | SEP (Malaysia) | | | MRN (Singapore) | | SIC (China) | | | Points |
| Pos. | Driver | R1 | R2 | R1 | R2 | R1 | R2 | R1 | R2 | R1 | R2 | R3 | R1 | R2 | R1 | R2 | R3 | Points |
|---|---|---|---|---|---|---|---|---|---|---|---|---|---|---|---|---|---|---|
| 1 | (Hong Kong) Eric Kwong | 1 | 1 | 1 | 1 | 2 | 3 | 1 | 5 | | | | | | | | | 177 |
| 2 | (Thailand) Munkong Sathienthirakul | Ret | 4 | 2 | 2 | 1 | 1 | 2 | 1 | | | | | | | | | 159 |
| 3 | (Hong Kong) Henry Kwong | 2 | 2 | 3 | 3 | 4 | 8 | 8 | 2 | | | | | | | | | 125 |
| 4 | (Philippines) Cao Qikuan | Ret | 3 | 4 | 5 | 5 | 2 | Ret | 3 | | | | | | | | | 92 |
| 5 | (Hong Kong) John Shen | 4 | 6 | 6 | 7 | 10 | 11 | 4 | 4 | | | | | | | | | 82 |
| 6 | (Macau) Lu Zhiwei | 3 | Ret | 9 | 9 | 3 | 4 | Ret | 9 | | | | | | | | | 69 |
| 7 | (Indonesia) Hendrik Jaya Soewadty | Ret | 7 | 5 | 12 | 12 | 6 | 5 | 6 | | | | | | | | | 61 |
| 8 | (Macau) Max Yao | | | Ret | 8 | 6 | 12 | 3 | 11 | | | | | | | | | 44 |
| 9 | (Malaysia) Adrian D'Silva | | | 7 | 6 | 8 | 10 | 6 | Ret | | | | | | | | | 43 |
| 10 | (Chinese Taipei) Jacky Wu | | | 8 | 4 | 11 | 7 | Ret | 10 | | | | | | | | | 42 |
| 11 | (China) Xu Zhefeng | WD | WD | Ret | 10 | 9 | 5 | Ret | 7 | | | | | | | | | 34 |
| 12 | (Canada) Christian Chia | | | | | 7 | 9 | 7 | 8 | | | | | | | | | 33 |
| 13 | (China) Zhu Zhiyao | 5 | 5 | Ret | 11 | | | | | | | | | | | | | 29 |
| Pos. | Driver | R1 | R2 | R1 | R2 | R1 | R2 | R1 | R2 | R1 | R2 | R3 | R1 | R2 | R1 | R2 | R3 | Points |
| Pos. | Driver | SIC (China) | | SUZ (Japan) | | CHA (Thailand) | | BAN (Thailand) | | SEP (Malaysia) | | | MRN (Singapore) | | SIC (China) | | | Points |

=== Dealer Trophy ===
| Pos. | Team | Pts |
|---|---|---|
| 1 | (Hong Kong) Team Jebsen | 347 |
| 2 | (China) TORO Racing | 290 |
| 3 | (China) Team Shanghai Yonda BWT | 273 |
| 4 | (China) Porsche Holding | 207 |
| 5 | Team Porsche New Zealand | 198 |
| 6 | (Malaysia) Sime Darby Racing Team | 168 |
| 7 | (China) Team Betterlife | 126 |
| 8 | (China) Porsche Own Retail 69 Team | 120 |

== See also ==
- 2024 Porsche Supercup
- 2024 Porsche Carrera Cup France
- 2024 Porsche Carrera Cup Germany
- 2024 Porsche Carrera Cup North America
- 2024 Porsche Carrera Cup Australia
- 2024 Porsche Carrera Cup Japan
