= Mathys Jaubert =

French racing driver (born 2005)

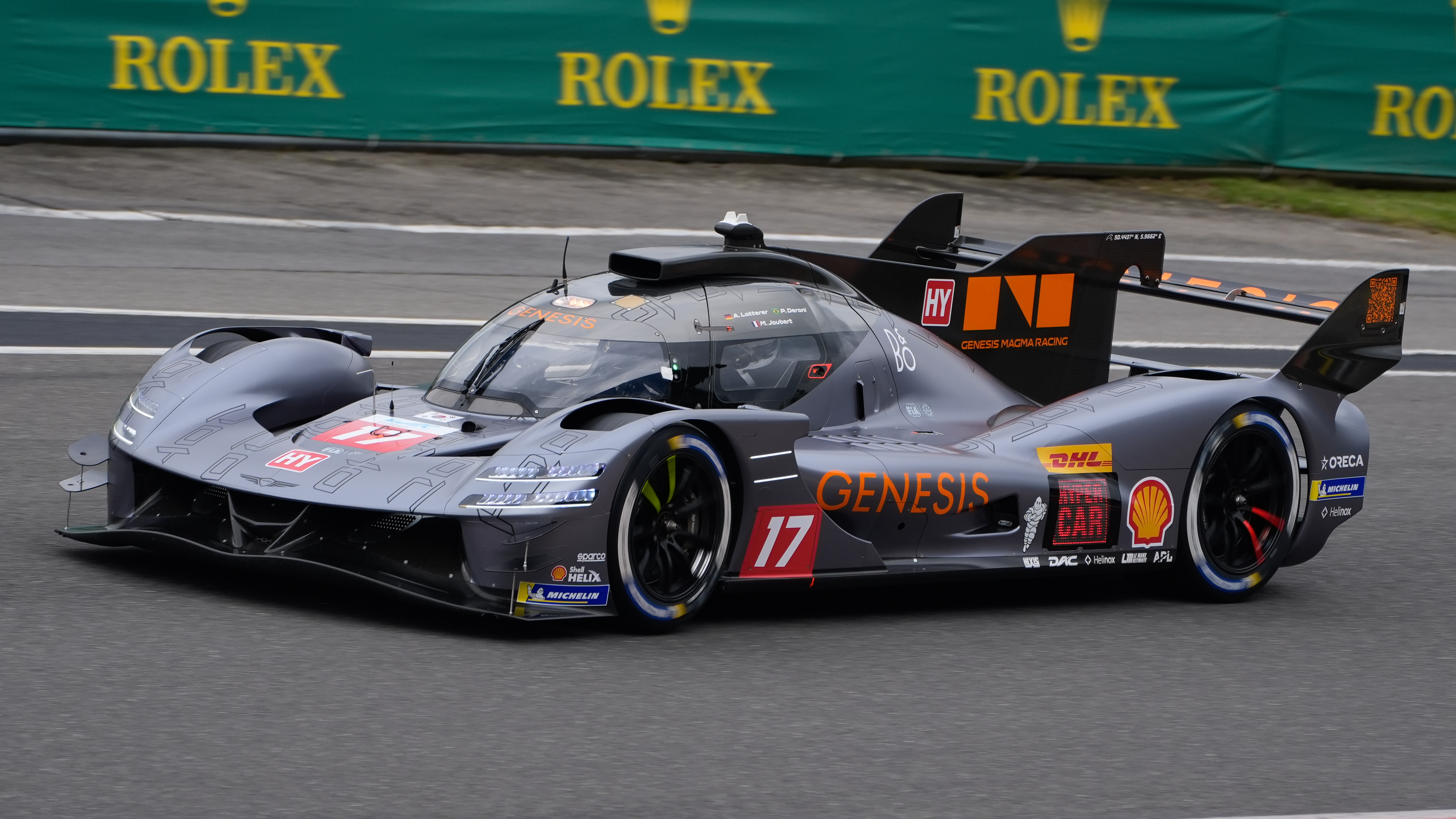
- Jaubert in 2026
- Nationality: (France) French
- Born: 3 March 2005 (age 21) Salon-de-Provence, France

European Le Mans Series career
- Debut season: 2025
- Current team: Kessel Racing
- Categorisation: FIA Silver (until 2026); FIA Gold (2027–)
- Car number: 57
- Former teams: IDEC Sport
- Starts: 12 (12 entries)
- Wins: 4
- Podiums: 6
- Poles: 0
- Fastest laps: 0
- Best finish: 3rd (LMP2) in 2025

Championship titles
- 2022 2022 2021: Ultimate Cup Series – CN; Caterham France – 420R; French Caterham Roadsport Championship

Awards
- 2025: ELMS Rookie of the Year

24 Hours of Le Mans career
- Years: 2025 –
- Teams: Genesis Magma Racing; IDEC Sport
- Best finish: DNF (2025)
- Class wins: 0

Mathys Jaubert (born 3 March 2005 in Salon-de-Provence) is a French racing driver who last competed in the FIA World Endurance Championship for Genesis Magma Racing in Hypercar, and the European Le Mans Series for Kessel Racing in LMGT3.

== Early and GT career ==
Jaubert started karting in 2013, featuring mostly in the French championship, and stepped up to cars upon turning 16. Missing out on a seat in Porsche Carrera Cup France for 2021, Jaubert competed in the French Caterham Roadsport championship that season and the French Caterham 420R championship the following year, winning both titles and being nominated Porsche Carrera Cup France junior ahead of 2023.

Joining TFT Racing for his maiden season in Carrera Cup France, Jaubert scored his first podium of the season in race two at Magny-Cours, and ended the season with a second-place finish in race two at Paul Ricard to finish fourth in points. In 2024, Jaubert joined Martinet by Alméras to compete in both the Porsche Carrera Cup France and Porsche Supercup, along with an overseas campaign for TORO Racing in Porsche Carrera Cup Asia. Scoring a best result of seventh in Supercup at Zandvoort, Jaubert had a much better time in the French championship, taking his first win of the season at Le Castellet before sweeping the Mugello round on his way to runner-up in points behind Alessandro Ghiretti. In Asia, meanwhile, Jaubert achieved one win at Sepang and finished third in points.

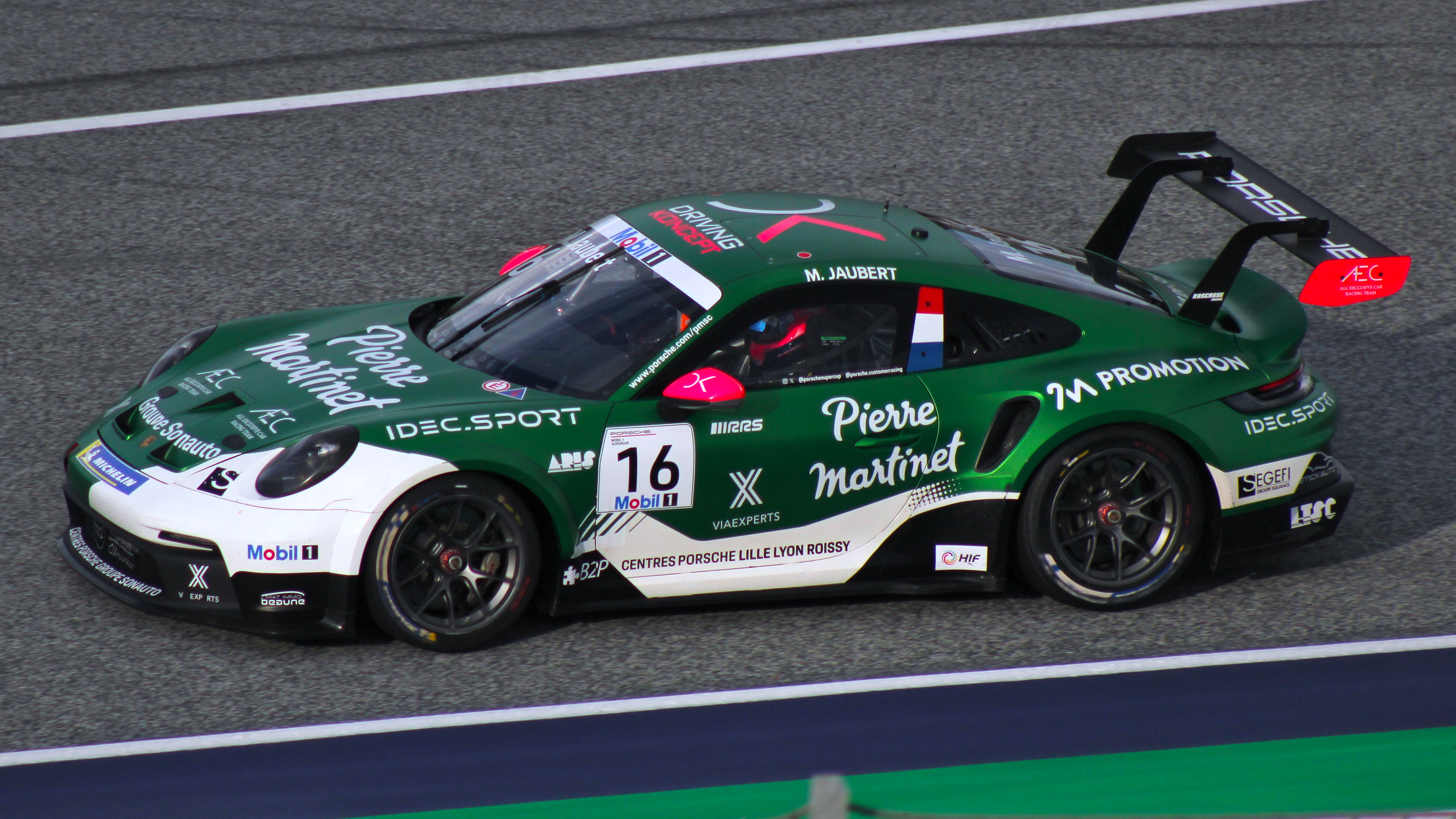
Jaubert driving for Martinet by Alméras at the Red Bull Ring in Porsche Supercup in 2025.

Alongside his ELMS commitments, Jaubert remained in Carrera Cup competition in 2025, returning to Martinet by Alméras to race in Porsche Supercup and Porsche Carrera Cup France. In the former, Jaubert scored a lone win at the Hungaroring and ended the year with a third-place finish at Monza to take eighth in points. In the latter, Jaubert began the year by winning both races at Dijon, before winning at Spa and Valencia to end the season fourth in points.

The following year, Jaubert joined Kessel Racing to race a Ferrari 296 GT3 Evo in the LMGT3 class of the European Le Mans Series alongside Daniel Serra and Takeshi Kimura. In his first full season in LMGT3 machinery, Jaubert finished third at Barcelona, before winning at Le Castellet and later ending the season sixth in points. During 2026, Jaubert also won the 24 Hours of Spa in the Bronze class for Kessel. At the end of the year, Jaubert joined Ferrari customer team CarGuy Racing to race in the GT3 class of the 2026–27 Asian Le Mans Series.

== Prototype career ==
In 2022, alongside his commitments in the French Caterham 420R championship, Jaubert also competed in the Ultimate Cup Series for ANS Motorsport, in which he took five out of six wins en route to the Group CN title. In October 2023, he had his first taste of LMP2 machinery, driving IDEC Sport's Oreca 07 at the European Le Mans Series rookie test at Portimão.

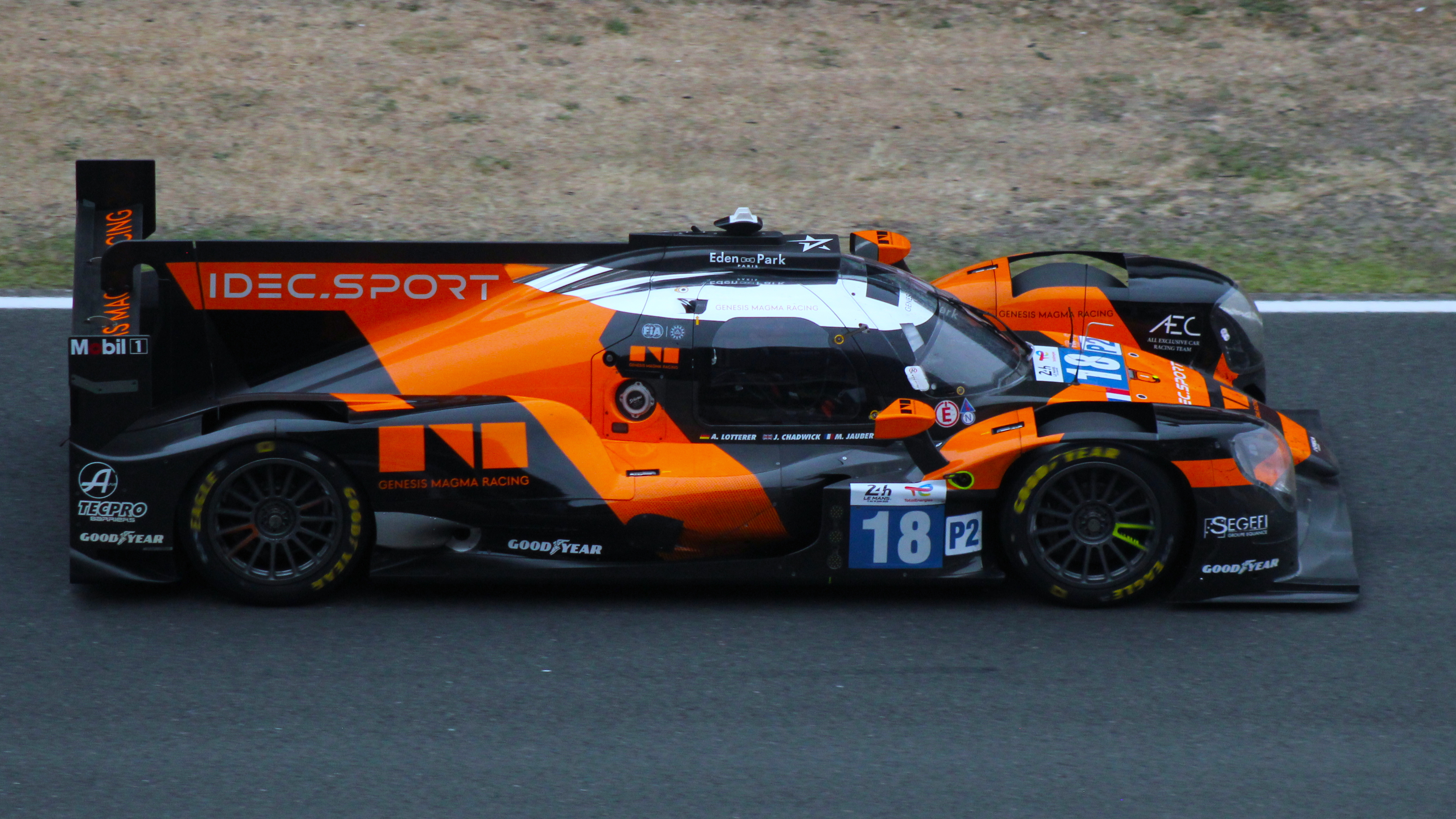
Jaubert drove for IDEC Sport at the 2025 24 Hours of Le Mans, retiring after 206 laps in his first appearance at the event.

In 2025, Jaubert joined IDEC's Genesis Magma Racing-backed car to compete in the LMP2 class of the ELMS alongside Jamie Chadwick and Logan Sargeant (later replaced by Daniel Juncadella). On his debut at Barcelona, Jaubert qualified fifth, ahead of teammate Job van Uitert, before a storming drive on Sunday which earned him the Goodyear Wingfoot Award. Taking over from Juncadella in second, he passed Pipo Derani in traffic and held a commanding lead until a late-charging Matthieu Vaxivière denied him overall victory on the final lap. The trio did still score maximum points, as the race-winning AF Corse squad was an LMP2 Pro-Am entry. Jaubert went one better on home soil the next month, winning the 4 Hours of Le Castellet overall in a wet-to-dry thriller. Jaubert then won at Silverstone and ended the year with a third-place finish at Algarve to secure third in the LMP2 standings, and was named ELMS's Rookie of the Year at the season-ending awards ceremony.

In 2026, Jaubert joined the main Genesis Magma Racing team to debut in the Hypercar class of the FIA World Endurance Championship. In his first season in the WEC, Jaubert took the team's first points in the series at the 6 Hours of Spa-Francorchamps and Lone Star Le Mans, before qualifying on pole for the 6 Hours of Barcelona, as the series' youngest-ever pole sitter at 21 years old.

In late 2026, Jaubert was confirmed to be remaining with Genesis Magma Racing for the following year's FIA World Endurance Championship.

== Karting record ==
=== Karting career summary ===
Season	Series	Team	Position
2013	Championnat Regional Pacac – Mini Kart		7th
2013	Coupe de France – Mini Kart		25th
2014	Coupe de France – Mini Kart	Kartinpro	7th
2014	Rotax Max Challenge France – Mini Kart		19th
2015	Championnat Regional Pacac – Mini		1st
2015	Coupe de France – Mini Kart	Kartinpro	2nd
2015	French Karting Championship – Mini Kart	Kartinpro	2nd
2016	French Karting Championship – Minime	Kartinpro	3rd
2016	Coupe de France – Minime	Kartinpro	2nd
2017	National Series Karting – Cadet	MJ Racing Team	15th
2017	French Karting Championship – Cadet	Team T3M Sport	2nd
2018	French Karting Championship – Junior		4th
2018	Coupe de France – Nationale	Jules Bianchi Competition	13th
2019	National Series Karting – Nationale		30th
2019	Coupe de France – Nationale	T3M Sport	4th
2019	French Karting Championship – Senior	T3M Sport	21st
2019	French Karting Championship – Nationale		18th
2020	National Series Karting – Nationale	T3M Sport	27th
2020	French Karting Championship – Senior	T3M Sport	7th

== Racing record ==
=== Racing career summary ===
Season	Series	Team	Races	Wins	Poles	F/Laps	Podiums	Points	Position
2021	French Caterham Roadsport Championship		12	12	?	?	12	?	**1st**
2022	Caterham France – 420R		14	11	?	?	13	?	**1st**
2022	Ultimate Cup Series – CN	ANS Motorsport	6	5	0	0	5	156	**1st**
2022	Ligier European Series – JS2 R	ANS Motorsport	2	0	0	0	2	36	12th
2022–23	Middle East Trophy – 992 Am	SebLajoux Racing by DUWO Racing	1	0	0	0	0	0	NC
2023	Porsche Carrera Cup France	TFT Racing	11	0	0	0	2	136	4th
2023	24H GT Series – 992 Am	SebLajoux Racing	1	0	0	0	0	0	NC
2023	Endurance Prototype Challenge – NP02	ANS Motorsport	5	1	0	1	3	74.5	6th
2024	Porsche Sprint Challenge Southern Europe	Martinet by Alméras	4	1	1	3	2	66	4th
2024	Porsche Carrera Cup France	Martinet by Alméras	12	3	2	0	9	226	**2nd**
2024	Porsche Supercup	Martinet by Alméras	8	0	0	0	0	41	10th
2024	GT Endurance Cup – Porsche Cup	Martinet by Alméras	1	1	0	0	1	25	11th
2024	Porsche Carrera Cup Asia	TORO Racing	14	1	1	3	11	249	**3rd**
2024	992 Endurance Cup – Am	Seblajoux Racing by DUWO Racing	1	0	1	0	1	—N/a	**3rd**
2024	Endurance Prototype Challenge – NP02	ANS Motorsport	1	0	0	0	0	0	NC
2025	Middle East Trophy – 992	SebLajoux Racing	1	0	0	0	0	0	NC
2025	European Le Mans Series - LMP2	IDEC Sport	6	3	0	0	4	90	**3rd**
2025	Porsche Carrera Cup France	Martinet by Alméras	10	4	5	3	6	173	4th
2025	Porsche Supercup	Martinet by Alméras	6	1	1	0	2	68	8th
2025–26	24H Series Middle East – 992	SebLajoux Racing	1	0	0	0	1	50	NC
2026	FIA World Endurance Championship – Hypercar	Genesis Magma Racing	8	0	1	0	0	11	20th
2026	European Le Mans Series – LMGT3	Kessel Racing	6	1	0	0	2	52	6th
2026	GT World Challenge Europe Endurance Cup	Kessel Racing	1	0	0	0	0	13	20th
2026	GT World Challenge Europe Endurance Cup – Bronze	Kessel Racing	1	1	1	0	1	50	7th
2026	Intercontinental GT Challenge	Kessel Racing	1	0	0	0	0	2	29th
2026–27	Asian Le Mans Series – GT3	CarGuy Racing							
2027	FIA World Endurance Championship – Hypercar	Genesis Magma Racing							

=== Complete Porsche Carrera Cup France results ===
(key) (Races in bold indicate pole position) (Races in italics indicate fastest lap)

Year	Team	1	2	3	4	5	6	7	8	9	10	11	12	Pos	Points
2023	TFT Racing	CAT; 1; 4	CAT; 2; 6	MAG; 1; 4	MAG; 2; 3	LMS; 4	RBR; 1; 6	RBR; 2; 8	MNZ; 1 Ret	MNZ; 2; 4	LEC; 1; 4	LEC; 2; 2		4th	136
2024	Martinet by Alméras	CAT; 1; 2	CAT; 2; 3	LEC; 1; 2	LEC; 2; 1	SPA; 1; 6	SPA; 2; 3	DIJ; 1; 2	DIJ; 2; 3	**MUG**; **1**; 1	**MUG**; **2**; 1	ALG; 1; 4	ALG; 2; 4	2nd	226
2025	Martinet by Alméras	CAT; 1	CAT; 2	DIJ; 1; 1	**DIJ**; **2**; 1	**SPA**; **1**; 2	**SPA**; **2**; 1	MIS; 1; 9	MIS; 2; 5	**VAL**; **1**; 1	**VAL**; **2**; 2	LEC; 1; 14	LEC; 2 Ret	4th	173

^{*}Season still in progress.

=== Complete Endurance Prototype Challenge results ===
(key) (Races in bold indicate pole position; results in italics indicate fastest lap)

Year	Entrant	Class	Chassis	1	2	3	4	5	6	Rank	Points
2023	ANS Motorsport	NP02	Nova Proto NP02	LEC1; 9	NAV; 3	HOC; 3	EST	MAG; 5	LEC2; Ret	6th	74.5
2024	ANS Motorsport	NP02	Nova Proto NP02	LEC1	ALG	HOC	MUG	MAG	LEC2; 10	NC	0

=== Complete Porsche Supercup results ===
(key) (Races in bold indicate pole position) (Races in italics indicate fastest lap)

Year	Team	1	2	3	4	5	6	7	8	Pos.	Points
2024	Martinet by Alméras	IMO; Ret	MON; 10	RBR; 8	SIL; 10	HUN; 8	SPA; Ret	ZAN; 7	MNZ; 15	10th	41
2025	Martinet by Alméras	IMO; Ret	MON; DNS	CAT	RBR; 5	SPA; 6	**HUN**; 1	ZAN; Ret	MNZ; 3	8th	68

^{*} Season still in progress.

=== Complete Porsche Carrera Cup Asia results ===
(key) (Races in bold indicate pole position; races in italics indicate points for the fastest lap of top ten finishers)

Year	Entrant	Class	1	2	3	4	5	6	7	8	9	10	11	12	13	14	15	16	DC	Points
2024	TORO Racing	Pro	SIC; 1; 2	SIC; 2; 2	SUZ; 1; 3	SUZ; 2; 3	CHA; 1; 2	CHA; 2; 3	BAN; 1	BAN; 2	**SEP**; **1**; 1	SEP; 2; 2	SEP; 3; 2	MRN; 1; 2	MRN; 2; 3	SIC; 1; 9	SIC; 2; 4	SIC; 3; 12	3rd	249

=== Complete European Le Mans Series results ===
(key) (Races in bold indicate pole position; results in italics indicate fastest lap)

Year	Entrant	Class	Chassis	Engine	1	2	3	4	5	6	Rank	Points
2025	IDEC Sport	LMP2	Oreca 07	Gibson GK428 4.2 L V8	CAT; 1	LEC; 1	IMO; 11	SPA; 11	SIL; 1	ALG; 3	**3rd**	**90**
2026	Kessel Racing	LMGT3	Ferrari 296 GT3 Evo	Ferrari F163CE 3.0 L Turbo V6	CAT; 3	LEC; 1	IMO; 11	SPA; Ret	SIL; 4	ALG; 13	6th	52

=== Complete 24 Hours of Le Mans results ===
Year	Team	Co-Drivers	Car	Class	Laps	Pos.	Class Pos.
2025	(France) IDEC Sport	(United Kingdom) Jamie Chadwick (Germany) André Lotterer	Oreca 07-Gibson	LMP2	206	DNF	DNF
2026	(South Korea) Genesis Magma Racing	(Brazil) Pipo Derani (Germany) André Lotterer	Genesis GMR-001	Hypercar	263	DNF	DNF

=== Complete FIA World Endurance Championship results ===
(key) (Races in bold indicate pole position; races in italics indicate fastest lap)

Year	Entrant	Class	Chassis	Engine	1	2	3	4	5	6	7	8	Rank	Points
2026	Genesis Magma Racing	Hypercar	Genesis GMR-001	Genesis GM8R 3.2 L Turbo V8	IMO; 15	SPA; 8	LMS; Ret	SÃO; 15	COA; 7	FUJ; 15	**CAT**; 16	MNZ; 13	20th	11

=== Complete GT World Challenge Europe results ===
==== GT World Challenge Europe Endurance Cup ====
(key) (Races in bold indicate pole position) (Races in italics indicate fastest lap)

Year	Team	Car	Class	1	2	3	4	5	6	7	Pos.	Points
2026	Kessel Racing	Ferrari 296 GT3 Evo	Bronze	LEC	MNZ	SPA; 6H; 14	SPA; 12H; 1	**SPA**; **24H**; 10	NÜR	ALG	7th	50
