= 2016 Rally America season =

Seasons
- ← 2015 2017 →

The 2016 Rally America season is the 12th consecutive season of the Rally America series. The Rally America series is currently the premiere stage rally championship in the United States. The season consists of eight events across the country.

== Championship Standings ==
This table represents the current championship standings from the 2016 Rally America season. Competitors that start each event get one point, competitors that finish get another point, and then further points are determined by placing order at the end of the event. 1st place receives 20 points, 2nd place receives 15 points, 3rd place receives 12 points and so on. The table underneath shows how points are distributed.

Pos.	No.	Class	Position In Class	Driver	Car	Sno*Drift	100 Acre Wood	Oregon Trail	Olympus Rally	Susquehannock Trail Performance Rally	New England Forest Rally	Ojibwe Forest Rally	Lake Superior Performance Rally	Total
1	75	Open	1	David Higgins	2016 Subaru WRX STI	DNS 0 Points*	2nd Place 17 Points	1st Place 22 Points	1st Place 22 Points	1st Place 22 Points	DNF 1 Point*	1st Place 22 Points	1st Place 22 Points	127
10	94	National Limited Open	2	Piotr Fetela	1998 Subaru Impreza STi	1st Place 22 Points	DNF 1 Point	DNS 0 Points	DNS 0 Points	DNF 1 Point	DNS 0 Points	11th Place 3 Points	DNF 1 Point	28
2	22	Super Production	1	Troy Miller	2011 Subaru WRX STI	2nd Place 17 Points	6th Place 8 Points	DNF 1 Point*	DNS 0 Points*	3rd Place 14 Points	2nd Place 17 Points	2nd Place 17 Points	5th Place 10 Points	83
19	989	Open	6	Brenten Kelly	2007 Subaru WRX STI	3rd Place 14 Points	DNS 0 Points	DNS 0 Points	DNS 0 Points	DNS 0 Points	DNS 0 Points	DNS 0 Points	DNS 0 Points	14
18	44	Open	4	Henry Krolikowski	2000 Subaru Impreza	4th Place 12 Points	DNF 1 Point	DNS 0 Points	DNS 0 Points	DNS 0 Points	DNS 0 Points	DNS 0 Points	8th Place 5 Points	18
6	90	Super Production	2	Lauchlin O'Sullivan	2009 Subaru WRX STI	5th Place 10 Points	3rd Place 14 Points	DNS 0 Points	2nd Place 17 Points	DNS 0 Points	DNS 0 Points	DNF 1 Point	3rd Place 14 Points	56
8	61	Super Production	3	Agatino Fortunato	2016 Subaru WRX STI	6th Place 8 Points	9th Place 4 Points	11th Place 3 Points	10th Place 3 Points	DNS 0 Points*	4th Place 12 Points	9th Place 4 Points	DNF 1 Point*	34
31	198	Open	8	Arkadiusz Gruszka	2014 Mitsubishi Mirage RS	7th Place 6 Points	DNS 0 Points	DNS 0 Points	DNS 0 Points	DNS 0 Points	DNS 0 Points	DNS 0 Points	DNF 1 Point	7
7	824	2 Wheel Drive	2	Cameron Steely	2012 Ford Fiesta R1	8th Place 5 Points	16th Place 3 Points*	6th Place 8 Points	12th Place 3 Points*	4th Place 12 Points	3rd Place 14 Points	5th Place 10 Points	7th Place 6 Points	55
4	99	2 Wheel Drive	1	Ryan Millen	2015 Toyota Rav4	9th Place 4 Points	DNF 1 Point*	5th Place 10 Points	5th Place 10 Points	5th Place 10 Points	5th Place 10 Points	3rd Place 14 Points	DNF 1 Point*	58
15	735	B Spec	1	Jordan Guitar	2015 Honda Fit	10th Place 3 Points	12th Place 3 Points	14th Place 3 Points*	9th Place 4 Points	DNF 1 Point*	13th Place 3 Points	10th Place 3 Points	14th Place 3 Points	19
13	134	2 Wheel Drive	3	Steve LaRoza	2014 Ford Fiesta ST	11th Place 3 Points	11th Place 3 Points	13th Place 3 Points*	DNF 1 Point*	11th Place 3 Points	8th Place 5 Points	8th Place 5 Points	11th Place 3 Points	22
37	157	Super Production	11	Tomas Solnicky	2008 Subaru WRX STI	12th Place 3 Points	DNS 0 Points	DNS 0 Points	DNS 0 Points	DNS 0 Points	DNS 0 Points	DNS 0 Points	DNS 0 Points	3
16	721	B Spec	2	Keanna Erickson-Chang	2016 Ford Fiesta	13th Place 3 Points	17th Place 3 Points*	16th Place 3 Points*	11th Place 3 Points	13th Place 3 Points	11th Place 3 Points	13th Place 3 Points	15th Place 3 Points	18
23	21	2 Wheel Drive	5	Jason Bailey	2014 Subaru BRZ	14th Place 3 Points	15th Place 3 Points	DNF 1 Point	14th Place 3 Points	DNS 0 Points	DNS 0 Points	DNS 0 Points	DNS 0 Points	10
38	440	Open	10	Jacob Bryant	1997 Subaru Impreza Outback Sport	15th Place 3 Points	DNS 0 Points	DNS 0 Points	DNS 0 Points	DNS 0 Points	DNS 0 Points	DNS 0 Points	DNS 0 Points	3
48	63	National Limited Open	11	Reid Andress	2003 Subaru Impreza WRX	DNF 1 Point	DNS 0 Points	DNS 0 Points	DNS 0 Points	DNS 0 Points	DNS 0 Points	DNS 0 Points	DNS 0 Points	1
49	57	National Limited Open	10	Jake Marsack	2000 Subaru Impreza WRX	DNF 1 Point	DNS 0 Points	DNS 0 Points	DNS 0 Points	DNS 0 Points	DNS 0 Points	DNS 0 Points	DNS 0 Points	1
39	888	National Limited Open	9	Jari Hamalaiene	2009 Mitsubishi Lancer Ralliart	DNF 1 Point	DNF 1 Point	DNS 0 Points	DNF 1 Point	DNS 0 Points	DNS 0 Points	DNS 0 Points	DNS 0 Points	3
50	95	Open	15	Tingwu Song	2006 Mitsubishi Evo 9	DNF 1 Point	DNS 0 Points	DNS 0 Points	DNS 0 Points	DNS 0 Points	DNS 0 Points	DNS 0 Points	DNS 0 Points	1
27	81	Super Production	6	Bucky Lasek	2008 Subaru WRX STI	DNF 1 Point	DNS 0 Points	DNS 0 Points	DNS 0 Points	DNS 0 Points	7th Place 6 Points	DNS 0 Points	DNS 0 Points	7
5	199	Open	2	Travis Pastrana	2016 Subaru WRX STI	DNS 0 Points	1st Place 22 Points	2nd Place 17 Points	DNS 0 Points	DNF 1 Point	DNS 0 Points	DNF 1 Point	2nd Place 17 Points	58
9	56	Super Production	4	Jeff Seehorn	2005 Subaru WRX STI	DNS 0 Points	4th Place 12 Points	9th Place 4 Points	3rd Place 14 Points	DNS 0 Points	DNS 0 Points	DNS 0 Points	DNS 0 Points	30
3	25	National Limited Open	1	Seamus Burke	2006 Mitsubishi Evo 9	DNS 0 Points	5th Place 10 Points	DNS 0 Points	DNS 0 Points	2nd Place 17 Points	1st Place 22 Points	4th Place 12 Points	13th Place 3 Points	64
17	475	National Limited Open	4	Adam Short	2002 Subaru Impreza WRX	DNS 0 Points	7th Place 6 Points	7th Place 6 Points	DNS 0 Points	DNS 0 Points	DNS 0 Points	12th Place 3 Points	10th Place 3 Points	18
11	370	National Limited Open	3	Gary Gill	2007 Subaru WRX STi	DNS 0 Points	8th Place 5 Points	DNS 0 Points	DNS 0 Points	6th Place 8 Points	9th Place 4 Points	7th Place 6 Points	DNF 1 Point	24
14	78	2 Wheel Drive	4	Dave Willingford	2012 Ford Fiesta	DNS 0 Points	10th Place 3 Points	10th Place 3 Points	13th Place 3 Points	8th Place 5 Points	DNF 1 Point*	15th Place 3 Points	12th Place 3 Points	20
24	81	National Limited Open	6	Travis Nease	2004 Subaru WRX STI	DNS 0 Points	13th Place 3 Points	DNF 1 Point	8th Place 5 Points	DNS 0 Points	DNS 0 Points	DNF 1 Point	DNS 0 Points	10
28	59	2 Wheel Drive	6	Marc Feinstein	1991 Porsche 911	DNS 0 Points	14th Place 3 Points	DNS 0 Points	DNS 0 Points	10th Place 3 Points	DNF 1 Point	DNS 0 Points	DNS 0 Points	7
40	491	2 Wheel Drive	12	Jim Stevens	2004 Suzuki Swift	DNS 0 Points	18th Place 3 Points	DNS 0 Points	DNS 0 Points	DNS 0 Points	DNS 0 Points	DNS 0 Points	DNS 0 Points	3
36	360	B Spec	3	Jean-Pierre Rasaiah	2012 Chevy Sonic	DNS 0 Points	19th Place 3 Points	DNS 0 Points	DNS 0 Points	DNS 0 Points	DNS 0 Points	DNS 0 Points	DNF 1 Point	4
51	542	Open	16	Matthew Conte	1991 Subaru Legacy	DNS 0 Points	DNF 1 Point	DNS 0 Points	DNS 0 Points	DNS 0 Points	DNS 0 Points	DNS 0 Points	DNS 0 Points	1
25	5	National Limited Open	5	Nick Roberts	2013 Subaru WRX STi	DNS 0 Points	DNF 1 Point	DNS 0 Points	DNS 0 Points	DNF 1 Point	DNS 0 Points	6th Place 8 Points	DNS 0 Points	10
52	11	2 Wheel Drive	13	Matt Brandenburg	1994 BMW VAC M3	DNS 0 Points	DNF 1 Point	DNS 0 Points	DNS 0 Points	DNS 0 Points	DNS 0 Points	DNS 0 Points	DNS 0 Points	1
53	237	2 Wheel Drive	14	Micah Nickelson	1987 Volkswagen Golf GTI	DNS 0 Points	DNF 1 Point	DNS 0 Points	DNS 0 Points	DNS 0 Points	DNS 0 Points	DNS 0 Points	DNS 0 Points	1
34	648	2 Wheel Drive	8	Anthony Concha	2014 Ford Fiesta ST	DNS 0 Points	DNF 1 Point	17th Place 3 Points	DNS 0 Points	DNF 1 Point	DNS 0 Points	DNS 0 Points	DNS 0 Points	5
54	353	B Spec	5	Rory Gardiner	2007 Toyota Yaris	DNS 0 Points	DNF 1 Point	DNS 0 Points	DNS 0 Points	DNS 0 Points	DNS 0 Points	DNS 0 Points	DNS 0 Points	1
55	42	B Spec	4	Peter Cunningham	2012 Honda Fit	DNS 0 Points	DNF 1 Point	DNS 0 Points	DNS 0 Points	DNS 0 Points	DNS 0 Points	DNS 0 Points	DNS 0 Points	1
20	198	Open	5	Bryan Bouffier	2014 Mitsubishi Mirage	DNS 0 Points	DNS 0 Points	3rd Place 14 Points	DNS 0 Points	DNS 0 Points	DNS 0 Points	DNS 0 Points	DNS 0 Points	14
22	30	Open	7	George Pisek	2006 Mitsubishi Evo 9	DNS 0 Points	DNS 0 Points	4th Place 12 Points	DNS 0 Points	DNS 0 Points	DNS 0 Points	DNS 0 Points	DNS 0 Points	12
21	238	Super Production	5	Matt Binczewski	2004 Subaru WRX STi	DNS 0 Points	DNS 0 Points	8th Place 5 Points	6th Place 8 Points	DNS 0 Points	DNS 0 Points	DNS 0 Points	DNS 0 Points	13
41	39	Super Production	10	Todd McAllister	2015 Subaru WRX	DNS 0 Points	DNS 0 Points	12th Place 3 Points	DNS 0 Points	DNS 0 Points	DNS 0 Points	DNS 0 Points	DNS 0 Points	3
42	19	Super Production	9	Jason Harper	2009 Subaru WRX STI	DNS 0 Points	DNS 0 Points	15th Place 3 Points	DNS 0 Points	DNS 0 Points	DNS 0 Points	DNS 0 Points	DNS 0 Points	3
46	18	Open	11	David Nickel	2008 Subaru WRX STI	DNS 0 Points	DNS 0 Points	DNF 1 Point	DNF 1 Point	DNS 0 Points	DNS 0 Points	DNS 0 Points	DNS 0 Points	2
56	89	Open	14	Wolfgang Hoeck	2002 Mitsubishi Lancer Evolution	DNS 0 Points	DNS 0 Points	DNF 1 Point	DNS 0 Points	DNS 0 Points	DNS 0 Points	DNS 0 Points	DNS 0 Points	1
57	773	2 Wheel Drive	16	Markus Saarinen	2003 Mini Cooper	DNS 0 Points	DNS 0 Points	DNF 1 Point	DNS 0 Points	DNS 0 Points	DNS 0 Points	DNS 0 Points	DNS 0 Points	1
29	310	2 Wheel Drive	7	Andrew Sutherland	1995 Honda Civic	DNS 0 Points	DNS 0 Points	DNF 1 Point	7th Place 6 Points	DNS 0 Points	DNS 0 Points	DNS 0 Points	DNS 0 Points	7
12	505	Open	3	Boris Djordjevic	2009 Mitsubishi Evolution X	DNS 0 Points	DNS 0 Points	DNS 0 Points	4th Place 12 Points	DNS 0 Points	DNS 0 Points	DNS 0 Points	4th Place 12 Points	24
33	121	Open	9	Nathan Usher	2002 Subaru WRX Wagon	DNS 0 Points	DNS 0 Points	DNS 0 Points	DNS 0 Points	7th Place 6 Points	DNS 0 Points	DNS 0 Points	DNS 0 Points	6
30	179	Super Production	7	Dennis Romero	2008 Subaru WRX STI	DNS 0 Points	DNS 0 Points	DNS 0 Points	DNS 0 Points	9th Place 4 Points	10th Place 3 Points	DNS 0 Points	DNS 0 Points	7
43	73	2 Wheel Drive	10	Tommy Passemante	2012 Honda Fit	DNS 0 Points	DNS 0 Points	DNS 0 Points	DNS 0 Points	12th Place 3 Points	DNS 0 Points	DNS 0 Points	DNS 0 Points	3
44	348	2 Wheel Drive	11	John Concha	2014 Ford Fiesta ST	DNS 0 Points	DNS 0 Points	DNS 0 Points	DNS 0 Points	14th Place 3 Points	DNS 0 Points	DNS 0 Points	DNS 0 Points	3
58	656	Open	17	Jack Swayze	1996 Subaru Legacy	DNS 0 Points	DNS 0 Points	DNS 0 Points	DNS 0 Points	DNF 1 Point	DNS 0 Points	DNS 0 Points	DNS 0 Points	1
47	55	Super Production	12	Patrick Brennan	2005 Mitsubishi Evo 9	DNS 0 Points	DNS 0 Points	DNS 0 Points	DNS 0 Points	DNF 1 Point	DNF 1 Point	DNS 0 Points	DNS 0 Points	2
59	930	2 Wheel Drive	17	Colin Robison	2011 Honda CR-Z	DNS 0 Points	DNS 0 Points	DNS 0 Points	DNS 0 Points	DNF 1 Point	DNS 0 Points	DNS 0 Points	DNS 0 Points	1
60	34	Open	12	Martin Egan	2006 Subaru WRX STI	DNS 0 Points	DNS 0 Points	DNS 0 Points	DNS 0 Points	DNF 1 Point	DNS 0 Points	DNS 0 Points	DNS 0 Points	1
61	127	Super Production	13	Alvin Fong	2006 Mitsubishi Evo IX	DNS 0 Points	DNS 0 Points	DNS 0 Points	DNS 0 Points	DNF 1 Point	DNS 0 Points	DNS 0 Points	DNS 0 Points	1
26	195	National Limited Open	7	Jon Fogg	2007 Subaru WRX STI	DNS 0 Points	DNS 0 Points	DNS 0 Points	DNS 0 Points	DNS 0 Points	6th Place 8 Points	DNS 0 Points	DNS 0 Points	8
45	165	National Limited Open	8	Ryan Wilcox	2007 Subaru WRX STI	DNS 0 Points	DNS 0 Points	DNS 0 Points	DNS 0 Points	DNS 0 Points	12th Place 3 Points	DNS 0 Points	DNS 0 Points	3
62	60	Open	13	Gary Donoghue	2003 Mitsubishi Evo 8	DNS 0 Points	DNS 0 Points	DNS 0 Points	DNS 0 Points	DNS 0 Points	DNF 1 Point	DNS 0 Points	DNS 0 Points	1
35	120	2 Wheel Drive	9	Barry McKenna	1978 Ford Escort RS1800	DNS 0 Points	DNS 0 Points	DNS 0 Points	DNS 0 Points	DNS 0 Points	DNF 1 Point	16th Place 3 Points	DNS 0 Points	4
32	47	Super Production	8	Tim Rooney	2015 Subaru WRX STI	DNS 0 Points	DNS 0 Points	DNS 0 Points	DNS 0 Points	DNS 0 Points	DNS 0 Points	14th Place 3 Points	9th Place 4 Points	7
63	457	National Limited Open	12	Sam Albert	2004 Subaru WRX ST	DNS 0 Points	DNS 0 Points	DNS 0 Points	DNS 0 Points	DNS 0 Points	DNS 0 Points	DNF 1 Point	DNS 0 Points	1
64	707	2 Wheel Drive	15	Will Hudson	2012 Ford Fiesta R2	DNS 0 Points	DNS 0 Points	DNS 0 Points	DNS 0 Points	DNS 0 Points	DNS 0 Points	DNF 1 Point	DNS 0 Points	1
65	74	2 Wheel Drive	18	Ramana Lagemann	1991 Porsche 911	DNS 0 Points	DNS 0 Points	DNS 0 Points	DNS 0 Points	DNS 0 Points	DNS 0 Points	DNS 0 Points	DNF 1 Point	1
66	73	B Spec	6	Rick Knoop	2009 Honda Fit	DNS 0 Points	DNS 0 Points	DNS 0 Points	DNS 0 Points	DNS 0 Points	DNS 0 Points	DNS 0 Points	DNF 1 Point	1
67	82	2 Wheel Drive	19	Mike Hurst	1974 Ford Capri	DNS 0 Points	DNS 0 Points	DNS 0 Points	DNS 0 Points	DNS 0 Points	DNS 0 Points	DNS 0 Points	DNF 1 Point	1

*In the above table, where noted, certain events and their points are dropped from the championship total. This is because there are only 6 allowed events in the national championship. This allows competitors that race in all 8 events to drop their two worst scores leaving them with 6 total races.

Position	Points
1st	20
2nd	15
3rd	12
4th	10
5th	8
6th	6
7th	4
8th	3
9th	2
10th-last	1
