= Stefan Rzadzinski =

Canadian racing driver (born 1993)

Stefan Rzadzinski (born January 5, 1993) is a Canadian racing driver from Edmonton, Alberta.

Rzadzinski won several regional karting titles and placed highly in many major American national karting championships from 2002 to 2008. In 2009 and 2010 he raced in the Ontario Formula Ford 1600 championship and placed second both years. He signed on with Davey Hamilton Racing to take a significant step up and make his Firestone Indy Lights debut in the series' 2011 double-header in Rzadzinski's hometown of Edmonton. Rzadzinski finished tenth and thirteenth in the two races, good enough for 37 points and 24th in the championship. He also participated in the 2011 Skip Barber Summer Series where he finished fifth with two wins in sixteen races. In 2012 he signed with JDC MotorSports to race in the Star Mazda Championship. He competed in ten of the seventeen races and finished sixteenth in points with a best finish of sixth in his home race in Edmonton.

In 2014, Rzadzinski ran four races in NASCAR Canadian Tire Series with a best finish of ninth.

In 2017, Rzadzinski won a social media contest which allowed him to compete alongside James Hinchcliffe at the 2017 Race of Champions, where he defeated both 2016 Indy 500 champion Alexander Rossi and former F1 driver Scott Speed in Nations' Cup group stage heats.

Rzadzinski's nickname in the paddock is "Razzle Dazzle".

== Motorsports career results ==
=== American open-wheel racing results ===
(key)

==== Indy Lights ====
Year	Team	1	2	3	4	5	6	7	8	9	10	11	12	13	14	Rank	Points
2011	Davey Hamilton Racing	STP	ALA	LBH	INDY	MIL	IOW	TOR	EDM; 10	EDM; 13	TRO	NHM	BAL	KTY	LVS	24th	37

==== Star Mazda Championship ====
Year	Team	1	2	3	4	5	6	7	8	9	10	11	12	13	14	15	16	17	Rank	Points
2012	JDC MotorSports	STP; 10	STP; 8	BAR; 10	BAR; 8	IND	IOW	TOR; 11	TOR; 12	EDM; 17	EDM; 6	TRO	TRO	BAL; 9	BAL; 11	LAG	LAG	ATL	**16th**	**108**

==== U.S. F2000 National Championship ====
Year	Team	1	2	3	4	5	6	7	8	9	10	11	12	13	14	Rank	Points
2013	JDC MotorSports	SEB; 5	SEB; 9	STP; 3	STP; 11	LOR; 10	TOR; 9	TOR; 27	MOH; 14	MOH; 13	MOH; 11	LAG	LAG	HOU	HOU	**14th**	**110**

=== NASCAR ===
(key) (Bold – Pole position awarded by qualifying time. Italics – Pole position earned by points standings or practice time. * – Most laps led.)

==== Canadian Tire Series ====
NASCAR Canadian Tire Series results
Year	Team	No.	Make	1	2	3	4	5	6	7	8	9	10	11	NCTSC	Pts
2014	Tagliani AutoSport	18	Dodge	MSP; 13	ACD	ICAR					RIS; 14	MSP	BAR	KWA	23rd	129
2014	22 Racing	24	Dodge				EIR; 9	SAS; 11	ASE	CTR					23rd	129

=== IMSA GT3 Cup Challenge Canada ===
Year	Team	1	2	Rank	Points
2018	Speedstar Motorsport	SEB	SEB	8th	48
2018	Speedstar Motorsport	5	9	8th	48
