= 2018 Rally America season =

The 2018 Rally America season was the 14th season of the Rally America series. The championship series began in November 2017 with the Nemadji Trail rally and concluded in October 2018 with the Lake Superior Performance Rally. Rally Wyoming was cancelled twice due to lack of participation.

== Rally Driver Overall National Championship Standings ==
Pos.	No.	Class	Driver	Car	Nemadji Trail	Sno*Drift	100 Acre Wood	Southern Ohio Forest Rally	Rally Colorado	Sno*Drift Summer	Rally Wyoming (Cancelled)	Show-Me Rally	Lake Superior Performance Rally	Total
1	194	Open Light	Dave Brown	2001 Subaru Impreza 2.5 RS	2nd Place 10 Points	1st Place; 30 Points	DNF; 1 Point	3rd Place; 22 Points	13th Place; 11 Points	2nd Place; 10 Points		2nd Place 10 Points	2nd Place 25 Points	119 Points
2	94	Open	Piotr Fetela	2017 Ford Fiesta FRT Proto	DNS 0 Points	DNF; 1 Point	1st Place; 30 Points	1st Place; 30 Points	DNF; 1 Point	1st Place; 12 Points		1st Place 12 Points	10th Place 3 Points	89 Points
3	887	Open Light	Jimmy Pelizzari	2000 Subaru Impreza	DNS 0 Points	4th Place; 20 Points	12th Place; 11 Points	11th Place; 11 Points	DNS; 0 Points	5th Place; 6 Points		DNS 0 Points	8th Place 13 Points	61 Points
4	3	Open Light	Nathan Usher	2002 Subaru WRX Wagon	1st Place 12 Points	DNF; 1 Point	7th Place; 14 Points	6th Place; 16 Points	DNS; 0 Points	3rd Place; 8 Points		DNF 0 Points	28th Place 3 Points	55 Points
4	423	2-Wheel Drive	Michael Hooper	2006 Lexus IS350	DNS 0 Points	DNS; 0 Points	6th Place; 16 Points	5th Place; 18 Points	DNS; 0 Points	DNS; 0 Points		4th Place 7 Points	7th Place 14 Points	55 Points
4	102	Open Light	Arek Bialobrzeski	2006 Subaru Impreza	DNS 0 Points	6th Place; 16 Points	11th Place; 11 Points	9th Place; 12 Points	DNS; 0 Points	DNS; 0 Points		DNS 0 Points	6th Place 16 Points	55 Points
7	25	2-Wheel Drive	Seamus Burke	1977 Ford Escort Mk2	DNS 0 Points	DNS; 0 Points	4th Place; 20 Points	4th Place; 20 Points	DNS; 0 Points	DNS; 0 Points		DNS 0 Points	19th Place 11 Points	51 Points
8	47	Super Production	Timothy Rooney	2015 PMR Motorsports SR009	DNS 0 Points	3rd Place; 22 Points	2nd Place; 25 Points	31st Place; 3 Points	DNS; 0 Points	DNS; 0 Points		DNS 0 Points	DNS 0 Points	50 Points
9	201	2-Wheel Drive	Adam VanDamme	1981 Volkswagen Rabbit	6th Place 5 Points	7th Place; 14 Points	39th Place; 3 Points	24th Place; 11 Points	DNF; 1 Point	DNF; 1 Point		9th Place 3 Points	14th Place 11 Points	49 Points
10	824	Super Production	Cameron Steely	2007 Subaru STi	DNS 0 Points	DNS; 0 Points	3rd Place; 22 Points	2nd Place; 25 Points	DNF; 1 Point	DNS; 0 Points		DNS 0 Points	DNS 0 Points	48 Points
10	76	2-Wheel Drive	Mike Erickson	2002 Mitsubishi Lancer	9th Place 3 Points	8th Place; 13 Points	21st Place; 1 Points	DNS; 0 Points	4th Place; 20 Points	DNF; 1 Point		DNS 0 Points	DNS 0 Points	48 Points
12	360	B-Spec	Doug Gekiere	2012 CHEVY SONIC	DNS 0 Points	20th Place; 11 Points	27th Place; 11 Points	32nd Place; 11 Points	DNS; 0 Points	14th Place; 3 Points		DNS 0 Points	25th Place 11 Points	46 Points
13	72	B-Spec	Keanna Erickson-Chang	2016 Ford Fiesta	DNS 0 Points	9th Place; 12 Points	29th Place; 11 Points	22nd Place; 11 Points	DNS; 0 Points	DNS; 0 Points		DNS 0 Points	19th Place 11 Points	45 Points
14	141	B-Spec	Chris Sladek	2015 Honda Fit	DNS 0 Points	DNS; 0 Points	24th Place; 11 Points	17th Place; 11 Points	15th Place; 3 Points	11th Place; 3 Points		11th Place 3 Points	17th Place 11 Points	42 Points
15	44	Open	Henry Krolikowski	2000 Subaru Impreza	DNS 0 Points	DNS; 0 Points	20th Place; 3 Points	12th Place; 11 Points	DNS; 0 Points	4th Place; 7 Points		DNS 0 Points	5th Place 18 Points	39 Points
16	810	Open	Bradley Hayosh	1998 Subaru Impreza	DNS 0 Points	22nd Place; 11 Points	DNS; 0 Points	44th Place; 11 Points	DNS; 0 Points	20th Place; 3 Points		DNS 0 Points	29th Place 11 Points	36 Points
17	87	Super Production	Mark Williams	2004 Subaru Impreza WRX STI	3rd Place 8 Points	DNS; 0 Points	8th Place; 13 Points	13th Place; 11 Points	DNS; 0 Points	DNS; 0 Points		DNS 0 Points	DNS 0 Points	33 Points
17	908	2-Wheel Drive	Justin Kollien	2013 Ford Fiesta R1	DNS 0 Points	13th Place; 11 Points	DNS; 0 Points	21st Place; 11 Points	DNS; 0 Points	DNS; 0 Points		DNS 0 Points	13th Placece 11 Points	33 Points
19	51	Open Light	Chris Barribeau	2001 Subaru Impreza	7th Place 4 Points	2nd Place; 25 Points	DNF; 1 Point	DNS; 0 Points	DNS; 0 Points	DNF; 1 Point		DNF 0 Points	DNS 0 Points	32 Points
19	198	Open	Arkadiusz Gruszka	2014 Mitsubishi Mirage RS	DNS 0 Points	DNF; 1 Point	5th Place; 10 Points	DNF; 1 Point	DNS; 0 Points	DNS; 0 Points		DNS 0 Points	4th Place 20 Points	32 Points
19	115	Open	Joseph Burke	2006 JRD Lancer Evolution	DNS 0 Points	DNS; 0 Points	DNF; 1 Point	DNF; 1 Point	DNS; 0 Points	DNS; 0 Points		DNS 0 Points	1st Place 30 Points	32 Points
22	777	Open Light	Jon Kramer	1993 Subaru Impreza Heavy Metal Edition	DNS 0 Points	5th Place; 18 Points	DNS; 0 Points	8th Place; 13 Points	DNS; 0 Points	DNS; 0 Points		DNS 0 Points	DNS 0 Points	31 Points
23	495	Open Light	Steve Bis	1999 Subaru Impreza	DNS 0 Points	DNS; 0 Points	DNS; 0 Points	DNS; 0 Points	1st Place; 30 Points	DNS; 0 Points		DNS 0 Points	DNS 0 Points	30 Points
24	474	Open Light	Jeff Hueser	2000 subaru impreza	DNS 0 Points	DNS; 0 Points	30th Place; 11 Points	DNS; 0 Points	12th Place; 3 Points	DNS; 0 Points		10th Place 3 Points	31st Place 11 Points	28 Points
25	515	2-Wheel Drive	Justin Mason	1990 Volvo 240	DNS 0 Points	DNS; 0 Points	19th Place; 11 Points	14th Place; 11 Points	DNS; 0 Points	DNS; 0 Points		8th Place 4 Points	DNS 0 Points	26 Points
25	725	Open Light	Michael Miller	1991 Mitsubishi Galant	DNS 0 Points	DNS; 0 Points	DNF; 1 Point	29th Place; 11 Points	14th Place; 3 Points	DNS; 0 Points		DNS 0 Points	22nd Place 11 Points	26 Points
27	171	Open	Jerry Kendall	2003 Subaru WRX wagon	DNS 0 Points	DNS; 0 Points	DNS; 0 Points	DNS; 0 Points	2nd Place; 25 Points	DNS; 0 Points		DNS 0 Points	DNS 0 Points	25 Points
27	140	2-Wheel Drive	Calvin Cooper	1991 BMW 318is	DNS 0 Points	DNS; 0 Points	41st Place; 11 Points	41st Place; 11 Points	DNS; 0 Points	DNS; 0 Points		18th Place 3 Points	DNF 0 Points	25 Points
29	386	2-Wheel Drive	Brad Morris	1980 Volvo 242	DNS 0 Points	19th Place; 11 Points	17th Place; 11 Points	DNF; 1 Point	DNS; 0 Points	DNS; 0 Points		DNS 0 Points	DNS 0 Points	23 Points
29	610	2-Wheel Drive	Craig Lumsden	2010 Mazda Speed 3	DNS 0 Points	DNS; 0 Points	43rd Place; 11 Points	36th Place; 11 Points	DNF; 1 Point	DNS; 0 Points		DNS 0 Points	DNS 0 Points	23 Points
29	280	2-Wheel Drive	Gregory Healey	1978 Datsun 280Z	DNS 0 Points	DNS; 0 Points	DNS; 0 Points	23rd Place; 11 Points	9th Place; 12 Points	DNS; 0 Points		DNS 0 Points	DNS 0 Points	23 Points
29	660	Open Light	Charles Surdyke	1993 Subaru Impreza L	DNS 0 Points	DNS; 0 Points	10th Place; 11 Points	10th Place; 11 Points	DNS; 0 Points	DNS; 0 Points		DNF 0 Points	DNS 0 Points	23 Points
33	422	2-Wheel Drive	John Barnett	1987 BMW 325is	DNS 0 Points	DNS; 0 Points	38th Place; 11 Points	34th Place; 11 Points	DNS; 0 Points	DNS; 0 Points		DNS 0 Points	DNS 0 Points	22 Points
33	170	Super Production	Nick Balzer	2004 Subaru WRX Wagon	DNS 0 Points	DNS; 0 Points	14th Place; 11 Points	18th Place; 11 Points	DNS; 0 Points	DNS; 0 Points		DNS 0 Points	DNS 0 Points	22 Points
33	67	2-Wheel Drive	Roger Matthews	1992 BMW 325i	DNS 0 Points	DNS; 0 Points	DNS; 0 Points	DNS; 0 Points	3rd Place; 22 Points	DNS; 0 Points		DNS 0 Points	DNS 0 Points	22 Points
33	150	Open	Ivo Draganov	2002 Subaru WRX Wagon	DNS 0 Points	11th Place; 11 Points	DNS; 0 Points	DNS; 0 Points	DNS; 0 Points	DNS; 0 Points		DNS 0 Points	26th Place 11 Points	22 Points
33	927	2-Wheel Drive	Cory Grant	1989 VW Jetta	DNS 0 Points	DNS; 0 Points	37th Place; 11 Points	DNS; 0 Points	DNS; 0 Points	DNS; 0 Points		DNS 0 Points	18th Place 11 Points	22 Points
33	24	B-Spec	Tracey Gardiner	2007 Toyota Yaris	DNS 0 Points	DNS; 0 Points	DNS; 0 Points	DNS; 0 Points	21st Place; 11 Points	DNS; 0 Points		DNS 0 Points	DNS 0 Points	22 Points
33	566	Open	Matt Huuki	Eagle Talon	DNS 0 Points	DNS 0 Points	DNS 0 Points	DNS 0 Points	DNS 0 Points	DNS 0 Points		DNS 0 Points	3rd Place 22 Points	22 Points
40	720	Super Production	Bradley Ames	1994 Subaru Impreza	DNS 0 Points	DNS; 0 Points	DNS; 0 Points	39th Place; 3 Points	5th Place; 18 Points	DNS; 0 Points		DNS 0 Points	DNS 0 Points	21 Points
40	815	Super Production	Zachary Whitebread	2003 Subaru WRX	DNS 0 Points	14th Place; 3 Points	DNS; 0 Point	7th Place; 14 Points	11th Place; 3 Points	DNS; 0 Points		DNS 0 Points	DNS 0 Points	21 Points
42	823	Open Light	Paul Johansen	1990 Audi Coupe Quattro	5th Place 6 Points	DNS; 0 Points	13th Place; 11 Points	DNS; 0 Points	DNS; 0 Points	DNS; 0 Points		DNS 0 Points	DNS 0 Points	20 Points
43	158	2-Wheel Drive	Spencer Sherman	1997 Ford Aspire	DNS 0 Points	DNS; 0 Points	22nd Place; 11 Points	DNS; 0 Points	DNS; 0 Points	DNS; 0 Points		3rd Place 8 Points	DNS 0 Points	19 Points
44	668	Super Production	Jeff Timpe	2002 Subaru WRX	4th Place 7 Points	DNS; 0 Points	16th Place; 11 Points	DNS; 0 Points	DNS; 0 Points	DNS; 0 Points		DNS 0 Points	DNS 0 Points	18 Points
44	122	2-Wheel Drive	Adam Hardin	1996 Volkswagen Jetta	DNS 0 Points	DNS; 0 Points	36th Place; 3 Points	25th Place; 11 Points	DNS; 0 Points	DNS; 0 Points		7th Place 4 Points	DNS 0 Points	18 Points
44	890	Open Light	Ryan Rethy	2000 Subaru Impreza Outback Sport	DNS 0 Points	DNS; 0 Points	15th Place; 11 Points	DNS; 0 Points	DNS; 0 Points	DNS; 0 Points		5th Place 6 Points	DNS 0 Points	18 Points
47	71	2-Wheel Drive	Garrett Griffith	1995 BMW 318i	DNS 0 Points	DNS; 0 Points	32nd Place; 11 Points	DNS; 0 Points	19th Place; 3 Points	DNS; 0 Points		13th Place 3 Points	DNS 0 Points	17 Points
48	727	2-Wheel Drive	Mitchell Bruno-Frederiksen	1996 Subaru Impreza	DNS 0 Points	DNS; 0 Points	DNS; 0 Points	DNS; 0 Points	6th Place; 16 Points	DNS; 0 Points		DNS 0 Points	DNS 0 Points	16 Points
48	661	Open Light	Kevin Young	1993 Subaru impreza	DNS 0 Points	DNS; 0 Points	18th Place; 11 Points	DNS; 0 Points	DNS; 0 Points	DNS; 0 Points		6th Place 5 Points	DNS 0 Points	16 Points
48	881	Open Light	Geoff Weide	1997 Subaru Impreza	DNF 1 Point	DNS; 0 Points	DNF; 1 Point	37th Place; 3 Points	DNS; 0 Points	DNS; 0 Points		DNS 0 Points	12th Place 11 Points	16 Points
48	82	G2	Mike Hurst	1974 Ford Capri	DNS 0 Points	DNS; 0 Points	DNS; 0 Points	DNS; 0 Points	DNS; 0 Points	6th Place; 5 Points		DNS 0 Points	15th Place 11 Points	16 Points
52	511	2-Wheel Drive	Jake Burke	1998 Honda Civic	DNS 0 Points	DNS; 0 Points	35th Place; 11 Points	DNF; 1 Point	DNS; 0 Points	DNS; 0 Points		19th Place; 3 Points	DNS 0 Points	15 Points
52	608	Open	Eric Carlson	1992 Mitsubishi Eclipse EVO 0.5	DNS 0 Points	12th Place; 11 Points	DNS; 0 Points	DNS; 0 Points	DNS; 0 Points	15th Place; 3 Points		DNS 0 Points	DNS 0 Points	15 Points
52	260	Open	Brian Ballinger	2004 Subaru Impreza WRX	DNS 0 Points	DNS; 0 Points	DNS; 0 Points	26th Place; 11 Points	DNS; 0 Points	10th Place; 3 Points		DNS 0 Points	DNF 0 Points	15 Points
52	722	2-Wheel Drive	Steven Olona	2011 Honda CRZ	DNS 0 Points	DNS; 0 Points	DNS; 0 Points	28th Place; 11 Points	DNS; 0 Points	DNS; 0 Points		DNS 0 Points	DNF 0 Points	15 Points
52	50	2-Wheel Drive	Allan Dantes	RX 7	8th Place 4 Points	DNS; 0 Points	DNS; 0 Points	DNS; 0 Points	DNS; 0 Points	DNS; 0 Points		DNS; 0 Points	20th Place 11 Points	15 Points
52	825	Open Light	Tyler Matalas	Subaru Impreza	DNF 1 Point	DNS; 0 Points	DNS; 0 Points	DNS; 0 Points	DNS; 0 Points	DNS; 0 Points		DNS; 0 Points	23rd Place 11 Points	15 Points
58	690	Open Light	Paul Oelrich	2000 Subaru RWX	10th Place 3 Points	10th Place; 11 Points	DNS; 0 Points	DNS; 0 Points	DNS; 0 Points	DNS; 0 Points		DNS 0 Points	DNS 0 Points	14 Points
58	352	2-Wheel Drive	Eliza Coleman	2010 Scion xD	DNS 0 Points	DNS; 0 Points	DNS; 0 Points	DNS; 0 Points	7th Place; 14 Points	DNS; 0 Points		DNS 0 Points	DNS 0 Points	14 Points
58	12	Open	Michael Engle	2004 PMR SR005 Rally	DNS 0 Points	DNS; 0 Points	9th Place; 12 Points	DNS; 0 Points	DNS; 0 Points	DNF; 1 Point		DNS 0 Points	DNS 0 Points	14 Points
58	929	2-Wheel Drive	Alex Berger	1997 Ford Escort ZX2	DNS 0 Points	21st Place; 11 Points	DNS; 0 Points	DNS; 0 Points	DNS; 0 Points	22nd Place; 3 Points		DNS 0 Points	DNS 0 Points	14 Points
58	780	Open Light	Darren Vancour	1993 Subaru Impreza	DNS 0 Points	DNS; 0 Points	28th Place; 11 Points	DNS; 0 Points	DNS; 0 Points	DNS; 0 Points		23rd Place; 3 Points	DNS 0 Points	14 Points
58	907	2-Wheel Drive	Jonas Lajos	1995 BMW 325	DNS 0 Points	DNS; 0 Points	31st Place; 11 Points	DNS; 0 Points	DNS; 0 Points	DNS; 0 Points		16th Place 3 Points	DNS 0 Points	14 Points
58	108	G2	Michael Witt	1990 BMW 325is	DNS 0 Points	DNS; 0 Points	DNS; 0 Points	DNS; 0 Points	DNS; 0 Points	21st Place; 3 Points		DNS 0 Points	16th Place 11 Points	14 Points
65	482	2-Wheel Drive	Gustavo Garrido	1991 Nissan Sentra SE-R	DNS 0 Points	DNF; 1 Point	DNF; 1 Point	20th Place; 11 Points	DNS; 0 Points	DNS; 0 Points		DNS 0 Points	DNS 0 Points	13 Points
65	413	2-Wheel Drive	Zachary Lumsden	2010 Volkswagen MKVI Golf	DNS 0 Points	DNS; 0 Points	DNF; 1 Point	33rd Place; 11 Points	DNF; 1 Point	DNS; 0 Points		DNS 0 Points	DNS 0 Points	13 Points
65	428	Open Light	Tyler Weaver	1993 Subaru Impreza	DNS 0 Points	DNS; 0 Points	DNS; 0 Points	DNS; 0 Points	8th Place; 13 Points	DNS; 0 Points		DNS 0 Points	DNS 0 Points	13 Points
68	477	2-Wheel Drive	Travis Wallick	1976 Volkswagen Golf	DNS 0 Points	16th Place; 11 Points	DNS; 0 Points	DNF; 1 Point	DNS; 0 Points	DNS; 0 Points		DNS 0 Points	DNS 0 Points	12 Points
68	48	2-Wheel Drive	Daniel Yarborough	1987 Volkswagen Golf	DNS 0 Points	DNS; 0 Points	40th Place; 11 Points	DNF; 1 Point	DNS; 0 Points	DNS; 0 Points		DNS 0 Points	DNS 0 Points	12 Points
68	193	2-Wheel Drive	Adam Brock	1989 Toyota Corolla	DNS 0 Points	DNS; 0 Points	DNS; 0 Points	38th Place; 11 Points	DNS; 0 Points	DNS; 0 Points		DNF 0 Points	DNS 0 Points	12 Points
68	564	Open Light	Arin DeMaster	2000 Subaru Impreza	DNS 0 Points	DNS; 0 Points	34th Place; 11 Points	DNS; 0 Points	DNS; 0 Points	DNS; 0 Points		DNS 0 Points	DNS 0 Points	12 Points
72	440	Open Light	Steven Stewart	1997 Subaru Impreza	DNS 0 Points	15th Place; 11 Points	DNS; 0 Points	DNS; 0 Points	DNS; 0 Points	DNS; 0 Points		DNS 0 Points	DNS 0 Points	11 Points
72	930	B-Spec	Colin Robinson	2015 Honda Fit	DNS 0 Points	17th Place; 11 Points	DNS; 0 Points	DNS; 0 Points	DNS; 0 Points	DNS; 0 Points		DNS 0 Points	DNS 0 Points	11 Points
72	180	Open	Michael Waterhouse	1990 Eagle Talon	DNS 0 Points	DNS; 0 Points	23rd Place; 11 Points	DNS; 0 Points	DNS; 0 Points	DNS; 0 Points		DNS 0 Points	DNS 0 Points	11 Points
72	36	B-Spec	Kubo Kordisch	2007 Toyota Yaris	DNS 0 Points	DNS; 0 Points	25th Place; 11 Points	DNS; 0 Points	DNS; 0 Points	DNS; 0 Points		DNS 0 Points	DNS 0 Points	11 Points
72	154	Open Light	Travis Clark	1985 Audi Quattro	DNS 0 Points	DNS; 0 Points	26th Place; 11 Points	DNS; 0 Points	DNS; 0 Points	DNS; 0 Points		DNS 0 Points	DNS 0 Points	11 Points
72	616	Open Light	Hong Cho	2004 Subaru Impreza RS	DNS 0 Points	DNS; 0 Points	33rd Place; 11 Points	DNS; 0 Points	DNS; 0 Points	DNS; 0 Points		DNS 0 Points	DNS 0 Points	11 Points
72	26	Open Light	Martin Spanhel	2004 Subaru Impreza	DNS 0 Points	DNS; 0 Points	DNS; 0 Points	15th Place; 11 Points	DNS; 0 Points	DNS; 0 Points		DNS 0 Points	DNS 0 Points	11 Points
72	234	Open	Jesse Yuvali	1995 Subaru Impreza STI Spec RA	DNS 0 Points	DNS; 0 Points	DNS; 0 Points	16th Place; 11 Points	DNS; 0 Points	DNS; 0 Points		DNS 0 Points	DNS 0 Points	11 Points
72	330	Open Light	Kevin Allen	1995 Subaru Impreza	DNS 0 Points	DNS; 0 Points	DNS; 0 Points	19th Place; 11 Points	DNS; 0 Points	DNS; 0 Points		DNS 0 Points	DNS 0 Points	11 Points
72	11	Open Light	Brian Battocchi	1996 Subaru Impreza Wagon	DNS 0 Points	DNS; 0 Points	DNS; 0 Points	27th Place; 11 Points	DNS; 0 Points	DNS; 0 Points		DNS 0 Points	DNS 0 Points	11 Points
72	303	2-Wheel Drive	Samuel Miller	2013 Ford Fiesta	DNS 0 Points	DNS; 0 Points	DNS; 0 Points	30th Place; 11 Points	DNS; 0 Points	DNS; 0 Points		DNS 0 Points	DNS 0 Points	11 Points
72	421	2-Wheel Drive	Daniel Quiet	1985 Honda CRX	DNS 0 Points	DNS; 0 Points	DNS; 0 Points	DNS; 0 Points	10th Place; 11 Points	DNS; 0 Points		DNS 0 Points	DNS 0 Points	11 Points
72	460	2-Wheel Drive	Ryan McLaughlin	1998 Acura Integra	DNS 0 Points	DNS; 0 Points	DNS; 0 Points	DNS; 0 Points	16th Place; 11 Points	DNS; 0 Points		DNS 0 Points	DNS 0 Points	11 Points
72	429	Super Production	Scott Crouch	2004 Subaru WRX	DNS 0 Points	DNS; 0 Points	DNS; 0 Points	DNS; 0 Points	17th Place; 11 Points	DNS; 0 Points		DNS 0 Points	DNS 0 Points	11 Points
72	54	Open Light	Krishna Gandhi	1995 subaru Impreza	DNS 0 Points	DNS; 0 Points	DNS; 0 Points	DNS; 0 Points	18th Place; 11 Points	DNS; 0 Points		DNS 0 Points	DNS 0 Points	11 Points
72	456	Open Light	Samantha Chiarelli	1994 Subaru Impreza	DNS 0 Points	DNS; 0 Points	DNS; 0 Points	DNS; 0 Points	20th Place; 11 Points	DNS; 0 Points		DNS 0 Points	DNS 0 Points	11 Points
72	45	Super Production	Grzegorz Bugaj	Subaru STI	DNS 0 Points	DNS; 0 Points	DNS; 0 Points	DNS; 0 Points	DNS; 0 Points	DNS; 0 Points		DNS; 0 Points	11th Place 11 Points	11 Points
72	531	2-Wheel Drive	John Kosmatka	Subaru BRZ	DNS 0 Points	DNS; 0 Points	DNS; 0 Points	DNS; 0 Points	DNS; 0 Points	DNS; 0 Points		DNS; 0 Points	21st Place 11 Points	11 Points
72	37	2-Wheel Drive	Billy Mann	Honda Civic	DNS 0 Points	DNS; 0 Points	DNS; 0 Points	DNS; 0 Points	DNS; 0 Points	DNS; 0 Points		DNS; 0 Points	24th Place 11 Points	11 Points
72	513	2-Wheel Drive	Jay Anderson	Toyota Celica	DNS 0 Points	DNS; 0 Points	DNS; 0 Points	DNS; 0 Points	DNS; 0 Points	DNS; 0 Points		DNS; 0 Points	30th Place 11 Points	11 Points
72	348	2-Wheel Drive	John Concha	Ford Focus ST	DNS 0 Points	DNS; 0 Points	DNS; 0 Points	DNS; 0 Points	DNS; 0 Points	DNS; 0 Points		DNS; 0 Points	33rd Place 11 Points	11 Points
72		2-Wheel Drive	Michael Cadwell		DNS 0 Points	DNS; 0 Points	DNS; 0 Points	DNS; 0 Points	DNS; 0 Points	DNS; 0 Points		DNS; 0 Points	34th Place 11 Points	11 Points
94	305	2-Wheel Drive	Santiago Iglesias	2013 Subaru BRZ	DNS 0 Points	DNS; 0 Points	DNF; 1 Point	DNF; 1 Point	DNS; 0 Points	9th Place; 3 Points		DNS 0 Points	32nd Place 3 Points	8 Points
95	666	Open Light	Caner Yildiz	2006 Subaru Impreza	DNS 0 Points	DNS; 0 Points	DNS; 0 Points	DNF; 1 Point	DNS; 0 Points	7th Place; 4 Points		DNS 0 Points	DNS 0 Points	6 Points
95	84	Open	Rob Sackyta	2003 Subaru WRX	DNS 0 Points	DNS; 0 Points	DNS; 0 Points	DNS; 0 Points	DNS; 0 Points	13th Place; 3 Points		DNS 0 Points	27th Place 3 Points	6 Points
97	735	2-Wheel Drive	Jordan Guitar	2017 Honda Civic	11th Place 3 Points	DNF; 1 Point	DNS; 0 Points	DNS; 0 Points	DNS; 0 Points	DNS; 0 Points		DNS 0 Points	DNS 0 Points	4 Points
97	267	Open Light	Dylan Helferich	2000 Subaru Impreza	DNS 0 Points	DNS; 0 Points	DNS; 0 Points	DNF; 1 Point	DNS; 0 Points	16th Place; 3 Points		DNS 0 Points	DNS 0 Points	4 Points
97	216	G2	Michael Ryba	1993 Honda Civic	DNS 0 Points	DNS; 0 Points	DNS; 0 Points	DNS; 0 Points	DNS; 0 Points	8th Place; 4 Points		DNS 0 Points	DNS 0 Points	4 Points
97	314	Open Light	Ty Crawford	1995 Subaru Impreza Outback Sport	DNS 0 Points	DNS; 0 Points	42nd Place; 3 Points	DNS; 0 Points	DNS; 0 Points	DNS; 0 Points		DNF 0 Points	DNS 0 Points	4 Points
97	151	Open Light	Peter Schaefer	2007 Subaru RWX	DNS 0 Points	DNS; 0 Points	DNF; 1 Point	DNS; 0 Points	DNS; 0 Points	DNS; 0 Points		17th Place 3 Points	DNS 0 Points	4 Points
97	918	Open Light	Ankit Patel	2001 Subaru Impreza 2.5RS	DNS 0 Points	DNS; 0 Points	DNF; 1 Point	DNS; 0 Points	DNS; 0 Points	DNS; 0 Points		15th Place 3 Points	DNS 0 Points	4 Points
97	27	Open Light	Tim Michel	1996 Audi A4	DNS 0 Points	DNS; 0 Points	DNS; 0 Points	DNS; 0 Points	DNS; 0 Points	17th Place; 3 Points		DNS 0 Points	DNF 1 Point	4 Points
97	584	2-Wheel Drive	Zachary Rondeau	Honda CRX	DNS 0 Points	DNS; 0 Points	DNS; 0 Points	DNS; 0 Points	DNS; 0 Points	DNS; 0 Points		9th Place 3 Points	DNF 1 Point	4 Points
97	90	Super Production	Erick Nelson	Subaru STI	12th Place 3 points	DNS; 0 Points	DNS; 0 Points	DNS; 0 Points	DNS; 0 Points	DNS; 0 Points		DNS; 0 Points	DNF 1 Point	4 Points
106	221	Open Light	Marianna Langosch	2002 Subaru Impreza	DNS 0 Points	18th Place; 3 Points	DNS; 0 Points	DNS; 0 Points	DNS; 0 Points	DNS; 0 Points		DNS 0 Points	DNS 0 Points	3 Points
106	35	Open	David Yein	1983 Audi Quattro	DNS 0 Points	DNS; 0 Points	DNS; 0 Points	35th Place; 3 Points	DNS; 0 Points	DNS; 0 Points		DNS 0 Points	DNS 0 Points	3 Points
106	462	2-Wheel Drive	Bradley Legris	2016 Toyota iM	DNS 0 Points	DNS; 0 Points	DNS; 0 Points	42nd Place; 3 Points	DNS; 0 Points	DNS; 0 Points		DNS 0 Points	DNS 0 Points	3 Points
106	750	Open Light	Meredith Pritchard	2007 Subaru Impreza	DNS 0 Points	DNS; 0 Points	DNS; 0 Points	43rd Place; 3 Points	DNS; 0 Points	DNS; 0 Points		DNS 0 Points	DNS 0 Points	3 Points
106	55	Super Production	Patrick Brennan	2005 Mitsubishi Evo 9	DNS 0 Points	DNS; 0 Points	DNS; 0 Points	45th Place; 3 Points	DNS; 0 Points	DNS; 0 Points		DNS 0 Points	DNS 0 Points	3 Points
106	70	Open Light	Michael Engle Jr	2000 Subaru Impreza RS	DNS 0 Points	DNS; 0 Points	DNS; 0 Points	40th Place; 3 Points	DNS; 0 Points	DNF; 1 Point		DNS 0 Points	DNS 0 Points	3 Points
106	970	2-Wheel Drive	Matthew Fess	2005 Ford Focus	DNS 0 Points	DNS; 0 Points	DNS; 0 Points	DNS; 0 Points	22nd Place; 3 Points	DNS; 0 Points		DNS 0 Points	DNS 0 Points	3 Points
106	513	G2	Eric Anderson	1983 Toyota Celica	DNS 0 Points	DNS; 0 Points	DNS; 0 Points	DNS; 0 Points	DNS; 0 Points	18th Place; 3 Points		DNS 0 Points	30th Place 11 Points	3 Points
106	369	Open Light	Austan Bever	Subaru Impreza	DNS 0 Points	DNS; 0 Points	DNS; 0 Points	DNS; 0 Points	DNS; 0 Points	DNS; 0 Points		11th Place 3 Points	DNS; 0 Points	3 Points
106	987	2-Wheel Drive	Josiah Shipley	Dodge Neon	DNS 0 Points	DNS; 0 Points	DNS; 0 Points	DNS; 0 Points	DNS; 0 Points	DNS; 0 Points		17th Place 3 Points	DNS; 0 Points	3 Points
106		Open Light	Kendal Clark		DNS 0 Points	DNS; 0 Points	DNS; 0 Points	DNS; 0 Points	DNS; 0 Points	DNS; 0 Points		21st Place 3 Points	DNS; 0 Points	3 Points
117	145	Open	Paulo Ferreira	2006 Mitsubishi Evolution IX	DNS 0 Points	DNS; 0 Points	DNF; 1 Point	DNF; 1 Point	DNS; 0 Points	DNS; 0 Points		DNS 0 Points	DNS 0 Points	2 Points
117	31	Super Production	Jeffrey Reamer	2017 Subaru 31 MTSPTS STI	DNS 0 Points	DNS; 0 Points	DNS; 0 Points	DNF; 1 Point	DNS; 0 Points	DNF; 1 Point		DNS 0 Points	DNS 0 Points	2 Points
117	237	2-Wheel Drive	Micah Nickelson	1987 Volkswagen Golf GTI	DNS 0 Points	DNS; 0 Points	DNF; 1 Point	DNS; 0 Points	DNS; 0 Points	DNS; 0 Points		DNF 0 Points	DNS 0 Points	2 Points
120	406	2-Wheel Drive	Harlan Goerger	Hondah CRX	DNF 1 Point	DNS; 0 Points	DNS; 0 Points	DNS; 0 Points	DNS; 0 Points	DNS; 0 Points		DNS; 0 Points	DNS; 0 Points	1 Point
120	126	2-Wheel Drive	Don Coatsworth		DNF 1 Point	DNS; 0 Points	DNS; 0 Points	DNS; 0 Points	DNS; 0 Points	DNS; 0 Points		DNS; 0 Points	DNS; 0 Points	1 Point
120	181	Open Light	Andrew Goss	2001 subaru impreza	DNS 0 Points	DNF; 1 Point	DNS; 0 Points	DNS; 0 Points	DNS; 0 Points	DNS; 0 Points		DNS 0 Points	DNS 0 Points	1 Point
120	153	2-Wheel Drive	Eric Langbein	1995 BMW 318ti	DNS 0 Points	DNF; 1 Point	DNS; 0 Points	DNS; 0 Points	DNS; 0 Points	DNS; 0 Points		DNS 0 Points	DNS 0 Points	1 Point
120	371	2-Wheel Drive	Artur Stepanov	1992 Volkswagen Jetta	DNS 0 Points	DNF; 1 Point	DNS; 0 Points	DNS; 0 Points	DNS; 0 Points	DNS; 0 Points		DNS 0 Points	DNS 0 Points	1 Point
120	77	2-Wheel Drive	Eric Patysiak	1987 BMW 325is	DNS 0 Points	DNS; 0 Points	DNF; 1 Point	DNS; 0 Points	DNS; 0 Points	DNS; 0 Points		DNS 0 Points	DNS 0 Points	1 Point
120	321	Open Light	Nate Ellis	2000 Subaru 2.5 RS	DNS 0 Points	DNS; 0 Points	DNF; 1 Point	DNS; 0 Points	DNS; 0 Points	DNS; 0 Points		DNS 0 Points	DNS 0 Points	1 Point
120	370	Super Production	Garry Gill	2008 Subaru WRX STi	DNS 0 Points	DNS; 0 Points	DNF; 1 Point	DNS; 0 Points	DNS; 0 Points	DNS; 0 Points		DNS 0 Points	DNS 0 Points	1 Point
120	951	2-Wheel Drive	Robert Pepper	1988 Porsche 944S2	DNS 0 Points	DNS; 0 Points	DNF; 1 Point	DNS; 0 Points	DNS; 0 Points	DNS; 0 Points		DNS 0 Points	DNS 0 Points	1 Point
120	550	Super Production	Justin Pritchard	2014 Subaru STI	DNS 0 Points	DNS; 0 Points	DNF; 1 Point	DNS; 0 Points	DNS; 0 Points	DNS; 0 Points		DNS 0 Points	DNS 0 Points	1 Point
120	28	Open	Eamon Fallon	2009 Mitsubishi Evo X	DNS 0 Points	DNS; 0 Points	DNS; 0 Points	DNF; 1 Point	DNS; 0 Points	DNS; 0 Points		DNS 0 Points	DNS 0 Points	1 Point
120	185	Super Production	Colin Ravenscroft	1991 Toyota Celica Alltrac	DNS 0 Points	DNS; 0 Points	DNS; 0 Points	DNF; 1 Point	DNS; 0 Points	DNS; 0 Points		DNS 0 Points	DNS 0 Points	1 Point
120	420	Open Light	Fabio Costa	2002 Subaru Impreza Wagon	DNS 0 Points	DNS; 0 Points	DNS; 0 Points	DNF; 1 Point	DNS; 0 Points	DNS; 0 Points		DNS 0 Points	DNS 0 Points	1 Point
120	33	2-Wheel Drive	Jason Smith	1999 BMW 328	DNS 0 Points	DNS; 0 Points	DNS; 0 Points	DNF; 1 Point	DNS; 0 Points	DNS; 0 Points		DNS 0 Points	DNS 0 Points	1 Point
120	64	Open	Josh Jacquot	1997 Subaru Impreza	DNS 0 Points	DNS; 0 Points	DNS; 0 Points	DNF; 1 Point	DNS; 0 Points	DNS; 0 Points		DNS 0 Points	DNS 0 Points	1 Point
120	319	2-Wheel Drive	Chris Greenhouse	2001 Dodge Neon SRT4	DNS 0 Points	DNS; 0 Points	DNS; 0 Points	DNF; 1 Point	DNS; 0 Points	DNS; 0 Points		DNS 0 Points	DNS 0 Points	1 Point
120	212	Open	Peter Zlamany	1994 Eagle Talon TSi AWD	DNS 0 Points	DNS; 0 Points	DNS; 0 Points	DNS; 0 Points	DNF; 1 Point	DNS; 0 Points		DNS 0 Points	DNS 0 Points	1 Point
120	595	2-Wheel Drive	Christopher Miller	2003 Ford Focus	DNS 0 Points	DNS; 0 Points	DNS; 0 Points	DNS; 0 Points	DNF; 1 Point	DNS; 0 Points		DNS 0 Points	DNS 0 Points	1 Point
120	650	Open	James Koch	2004 Subaru Impreza WRX	DNS 0 Points	DNS; 0 Points	DNS; 0 Points	DNS; 0 Points	DNF; 1 Point	DNS; 0 Points		DNS 0 Points	DNS 0 Points	1 Point
120	475	Super Production	Adam Short	2002 Subaru Impreza WRX	DNS 0 Points	DNS; 0 Points	DNS; 0 Points	DNS; 0 Points	DNF; 1 Point	DNS; 0 Points		DNS 0 Points	DNS 0 Points	1 Point
120	906	Open Light	Johan Bjorkquist	1992 Eagle Talon TSI	DNS 0 Points	DNS; 0 Points	DNS; 0 Points	DNS; 0 Points	DNF; 1 Point	DNS; 0 Points		DNS 0 Points	DNS 0 Points	1 Point
120	559	Super Production	Eric Genack	1998 Subaru Impreza WRX	DNS 0 Points	DNS; 0 Points	DNS; 0 Points	DNS; 0 Points	DNF; 1 Point	DNS; 0 Points		DNS 0 Points	DNS 0 Points	1 Point
120	161	2-Wheel Drive	Bret Hunter	1990 Honda CRX	DNS 0 Points	DNS; 0 Points	DNS; 0 Points	DNS; 0 Points	DNF; 1 Point	DNS; 0 Points		DNS 0 Points	DNS 0 Points	1 Point
120	156	2-Wheel Drive	David Kern	1995 BMW 318TI	DNS 0 Points	DNS; 0 Points	DNS; 0 Points	DNS; 0 Points	DNF; 1 Point	DNS; 0 Points		DNS 0 Points	DNS 0 Points	1 Point
120	12	Open Light	Steve Gingras	Subaru Impreza	DNS 0 Points	DNS; 0 Points	DNS; 0 Points	DNS; 0 Points	DNS; 0 Points	DNF 1 Point		DNS; 0 Points	DNS; 0 Points	1 Point
120	213	2-Wheel Drive	Stephan Sherry	Ford Focus	DNS 0 Points	DNS; 0 Points	DNS; 0 Points	DNS; 0 Points	DNS; 0 Points	DNS; 0 Points		DNF 1 Point	DNS; 0 Points	1 Point
120	636	Super Production	Samir Kaltak	Subaru WRX	DNS 0 Points	DNS; 0 Points	DNS; 0 Points	DNS; 0 Points	DNS; 0 Points	DNS; 0 Points		DNS; 0 Points	DNF 1 Point	1 Point
120	54	Open Light	Brandon Boyd	Subaru Impreza	DNS 0 Points	DNS; 0 Points	DNS; 0 Points	DNS; 0 Points	DNS; 0 Points	DNS; 0 Points		DNS; 0 Points	DNF 1 Point	1 Point
120	873	2-Wheel Drive	Kyle Cooper	VW Rabbit	DNS 0 Points	DNS; 0 Points	DNS; 0 Points	DNS; 0 Points	DNS; 0 Points	DNS; 0 Points		DNS; 0 Points	DNF 1 Point	1 Point
120	574	Open Light	Brandon Reinhardt	Subaru Impreza	DNS 0 Points	DNS; 0 Points	DNS; 0 Points	DNS; 0 Points	DNS; 0 Points	DNS; 0 Points		DNS; 0 Points	DNF 1 Point	1 Point
120	292	2-Wheel Drive	Matt Coatsworth	Dodge Neon	DNS 0 Points	DNS; 0 Points	DNS; 0 Points	DNS; 0 Points	DNS; 0 Points	DNS; 0 Points		DNS; 0 Points	DNF 1 Point	1 Point
120	174	2-Wheel Drive	Kevin Schmidt	Mazda RX7	DNS 0 Points	DNS; 0 Points	DNS; 0 Points	DNS; 0 Points	DNS; 0 Points	DNS; 0 Points		DNS; 0 Points	DNF 1 Point	1 Point
120	81	Super Production	Travis Nease	Subaru STI	DNS 0 Points	DNS; 0 Points	DNS; 0 Points	DNS; 0 Points	DNS; 0 Points	DNS; 0 Points		DNS; 0 Points	DNF 1 Point	1 Point
120	211	Open Light	Andrew Dustman	Subaru Impreza	DNS 0 Points	DNS; 0 Points	DNS; 0 Points	DNS; 0 Points	DNS; 0 Points	DNS; 0 Points		DNS; 0 Points	DNF 1 Point	1 Point
UTV-1	331	Open	Tadd Rigsby	2018 Canam X3xrc	DNS 0 Points	DNS; 0 Points	DNS; 0 Points	DNS; 0 Points	1st Place; 22 Points	DNS; 0 Points	DNS 0 Points	DNS 0 Points	DNS 0 Points	22 Points
UTV-2	967	Open	Rhys Millen	2017 Polaris rzr turbo	DNS 0 Points	DNS; 0 Points	DNS; 0 Points	DNS; 0 Points	DNF; 1 Point	DNS; 0 Points	DNS 0 Points	DNS 0 Points	DNS 0 Points	1 Point
UTV-2	219	Open	Stephan Verdier	2017 Polaris XPT	DNS 0 Points	DNS; 0 Points	DNS; 0 Points	DNS; 0 Points	DNF; 1 Point	DNS; 0 Points	DNS 0 Points	DNS 0 Points	DNS 0 Points	1 Point
UTV-3	353	Open	Rory Gardiner	2018 CanAm Maverick X3Xrs	DNS 0 Points	DNS; 0 Points	DNS; 0 Points	DNS; 0 Points	DNF; 1 Point	DNS; 0 Points	DNS 0 Points	DNS 0 Points	DNS 0 Points	1 Point
