= X Games VIII =

2002 extreme sports tournament

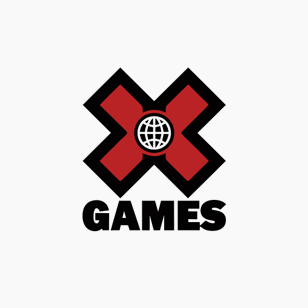
Logo

X Games VIII was an American sporting event that was held in Philadelphia, Pennsylvania in August 2002.

== Description ==
The eighth X Games were held in Philadelphia from August 15 to 19, 2002. The events included Moto X (Big Air, Step Up and Freestyle), Skateboarding (Park, Vert Best Trick, Vert Doubles, Vert, Street and Street Best Trick), BMX (Park, Flatland, Vert, Dirt and Downhill), Wakeboarding (Men and Women), Aggressive Inline (Men's Vert, Men's Park and Women's Park) and Speed Climbing (Men and Women).

== Results ==
=== Moto X - Big Air ===
Place	Athlete	Score
Gold	Mike Metzger	95.00
Silver	Carey Hart	94.67
Bronze	Brian Deegan	90.33
4	Dayne Kinnaird	90.33
5	Nate Adams	90.33
6	Dan Pastor	90.33
7	Ronnie Faisst	89.33
8	Ronnie Renner	89.33
9	Trevor Vines	89.33
10	Mike Jones	87.67
11	Doug Parsons
12	Drake McElroy	87.00
13	Clifford Adoptante	86.67
14	Tommy Clowers	86.33
15	Kris Rourke
16	Benoit Milot
17	Jeff Kargola

=== Moto X - Step Up ===
Place	Athlete	Height
Gold	Tommy Clowers	34'0"
Silver	Mike Metzger	33'0"
Bronze	Brian Deegan	33'0"
4	Jeremy Stenberg	32'0"
5	Ronnie Renner	32'0"
6	Kris Rourke	31'0"
7	Drake McElroy	29'0"
8	Justin Homan	29'0"
9	Jeff Tilton	29'0"
10	Jeremy Carter	29'0"
11	Ronnie Faisst	29'0"

=== Moto X - Freestyle ===
Place	Athlete	Score
Gold	Mike Metzger	98.00
Silver	Kenny Bartram	91.67
Bronze	Drake McElroy	91.33
4	Ronnie Renner	91.33
5	Tommy Clowers	89.33
6	Clifford Adoptante	88.67
7	Dayne Kinnaird	87.33
8	Nate Adams	86.33

=== Skateboarding - Park ===
Place	Athlete	Score
Gold	Rodil de Araujo Jr.	93.00
Silver	Wagner Ramos	92.00
Bronze	Eric Koston	90.75
4	Grady White	89.00
5	Chad Bartie	87.75
6	Austen Seaholm	87.50
7	Dayne Brummet	84.25
8	Rick McCrank	83.50
9	Frank Hirata	83.25
10	Wolnei dos Santos	82.00
11	Kerry Getz	78.75
12	Caine Gayle	77.50
13	Mark Alexander	77.25
14	Darren Kaehne	72.75
15	Rodolfo Ramos	72.50
16	Pat Chanita	72.50
17	Andy MacDonald	72.25
18	Omar Hassan	71.25
19	Carlos de Andrade	69.50
20	Kyle Berard	57.25

=== Skateboarding - Vert Best Trick ===
Place	Athlete	Trick
Gold	Pierre-Luc Gagnon	Heelflip 540 McTwist
Silver	Sandro Dias	Backside 540 Christ Air to Body Jar
Bronze	Tony Hawk	Frontside Fakie to Fakie 540 (360 Varial 540 after time)
4	Bob Burnquist	Bluntslide to fakie on bench (Cab Kickflip after time)
5	Matt Dove	Attempted Ollie Big Spin 540

=== Skateboarding - Vert Doubles ===
Place	Athlete	Score
Gold	Tony Hawk/Andy MacDonald	95.50
Silver	Bob Burnquist/Bucky Lasek	93.50
Bronze	Mike Crum/Rune Glifberg	82.25
4	Hendrix/Alexander	80.50
5	Fritsch/Furlong	78.25
6	Dias/Mateus
7	Dufour/Ringstrom
8	Gagnon/Brown
9	Gentry/Mayer
10	Ueda/Hassan
11	Millar/Horrwarth

=== Skateboarding - Vert ===
Place	Athlete	Score
Gold	Pierre-Luc Gagnon	96.75
Silver	Bob Burnquist	90.00
Bronze	Rune Glifberg	89.50
4	Bucky Lasek	88.50
5	Chris Gentry	88.25
6	Mathias Ringstrom	88.00
7	Andy MacDonald	87.50
8	Anthony Furlong	85.00
9	Jake Brown	84.75
10	Juergen Horrwarth	75.50

=== Skateboarding - Street ===
Place	Athlete	Score
Gold	Rodil de Araujo Jr.	89.6
Silver	Wagner Ramos	83.6
Bronze	Kyle Berard	83
4	Chris Senn	82
5	Mark Alexander	82
6	Ricky Oyola	80
7	Caine Gayle	77.6
8	Kerry Getz	77.3
9	Josh Kalis	70

=== Skateboarding - Street Best Trick ===
Place	Athlete
Gold	Rodil de Araujo Jr.
Silver	Wagner Ramos
Bronze	Dayne Brummet
4	Kyle Berard
5	Chris Senn
6	Josh Kalis
7	Caine Gayle
8	Ricky Oyola
9	Kerry Getz

=== BMX - Park ===
Place	Athlete	Score
Gold	Ryan Nyquist	93.40
Silver	Alistair Whitton	91.80
Bronze	Chad Kagy	91.80
4	Dave Mirra	90.80
5	Gary Young	88.60
6	Jay Miron	88.20
7	Brian Foster	88.00
8	Josh Harrington	87.60
9	Colin Mackay	87.00
10	Bruce Crisman	85.80

=== BMX - Flatland ===
Place	Athlete	Score
Gold	Martti Kuoppa	95.00
Silver	Michael Steingraeber	93.40
Bronze	Phil Dolan	93.00
4	Trevor Meyer	92.00
5	Nathan Penonzek	91.60
6	Stephen Cerra	88.40
7	Alex Jumelin	85.80
8	Matt Wilhelm	85.20
9	Jorge Gomez	83.60
10	Effraim Catlow	83.20

=== BMX - Vert ===
Place	Athlete	Score
Gold	Dave Mirra	94.40
Silver	Mat Hoffman	91.40
Bronze	Simon Tabron	90.80
4	Kevin Robinson	89.60
5	Jay Miron	89.40
6	John Parker	88.00
7	Jimmy Walker	86.80
8	Chad Kagy	86.00
9	Dennis McCoy	84.40
10	Bob Kohl	83.20

=== BMX - Dirt ===
Place	Athlete	Score
Gold	Allan Cooke	90.47
Silver	Ryan Nyquist	89.53
Bronze	Chris Doyle	89.47
4	T.J. Lavin	88.67
5	Colin Mackay	88.13
6	Brian Foster	87.93
7	Scott Wirch	85.53
8	Kris Bennett	84.20
9	Paul Kitner	83.60
10	Mark Kehl	82.93

=== BMX - Downhill ===
Place	Athlete	Score
Gold	Robbie Miranda	47.359
Silver	Kyle Bennett	47.749
Bronze	Robert de Wilde	48.003
4	Wade Boots	49.328
5	Matt Pohlkamp	49.857
6	Jamie Staff	50.663
7	Bubba Harris	57.705
8	Randy Stumpfhauser	60.643
9	Justin Loffredo
10	Brian Schmith

=== Wakeboarding - Men ===
Place	Athlete	Score
Gold	Danny Harf	70.00
Silver	Darin Shapiro	68.00
Bronze	Shaun Murray	63.33
4	Chad Sharpe	60.56
5	Erik Ruck	59.00
6	Brett Eisenhauer	51.44
7	Parks Bonifay	77.6
8	Trevor Hansen	49.67
9	Shane Bonifay
10	Andrew Adkison

=== Wakeboarding - Women ===
Place	Athlete	Score
Gold	Emily Copeland	68.00
Silver	Dallas Friday	65.56
Bronze	Leslie Kent	60.11
4	Melissa Marquardt	55.11
5	Maeghan Major	51.78
6	Buster Lutgert	50.33
7	Megan McNeil	32.56
8	Tara Hamilton	20.89

=== Aggressive Inline - Men's Vert ===
Place	Athlete	Score
Gold	Takeshi Yasutoko	97.00
Silver	Eito Yasutoko	93.75
Bronze	Marc Englehart	89.75
4	Rui Kitamura	85.75
5	Beni Huber	82.50
6	Mike Budnik	80.75
7	Nel Martin	78.00
8	Shane Yost	76.75
9	Matt Lindenmuth	55.75
10	Taig Khris

=== Aggressive Inline - Men's Park ===
Place	Athlete	Score
Gold	Jaren Grob	94.00
Silver	Bruno Löwe	93.00
Bronze	Blake Dennis	84.75
4	Carlos Pianowski	83.00
5	Ian Brown (Inline skater)	80.75
6	Louie Zamora	77.50
7	Mike Budnik	76.50
8	Jason Stinsmen	69.75
9	Aaron Feinberg	68.75
10	Stephane Alfano	61.50

=== Aggressive Inline - Women's Park ===
Place	Athlete	Score
Gold	Martina Svobodova	56.75
Silver	Jenna Downing	47.75
Bronze	Fallon Hefferman	44.75
4	Angela Araujo	41.75

=== Speed Climbing - Men ===
Place	Athlete
Gold	Maxim Stenkovoy
Silver	Alexandre Pechekhonov
Bronze	Serguei Sinitsyn
4	Tomasz Oleksy
5	Nur Rosyid
6	Marco Jubes
7	Hans Florine
8	Aaron Shamy

=== Speed Climbing - Women ===
Place	Athlete
Gold	Tori Allen
Silver	Olga Zakharova
Bronze	Etti Hendrawati
4	Elena Repko
5	Evi Neliwati
6	Maia Piratinskaia
7	Daniela Vargas
8	Zosia Podgorbounskih
