= Ultimate X: The Movie =

- Directed by: Bruce Hendricks
- Written by: Bruce Hendricks
- Produced by: Art Repola
- Starring: Dave Mirra; Mike Metzger; Bucky Lasek; Brian Deegan; Mat Hoffman
- Cinematography: Reed Smoot; Rodney Taylor; C. Mitchell Amundsen
- Edited by: Morgan Griswold
- Production companies: Touchstone Pictures; ESPN Films
- Distributed by: Buena Vista Pictures Distribution
- Release date: May 6, 2002
- Running time: 47 minutes
- Country: United States
- Language: English
- Box office: $4.1 million

Ultimate X: The Movie is a 2002 American sports documentary film written and directed by Bruce Hendricks about the 2001 X Games.

It features athletes including Dave Mirra, Travis Pastrana, Mike Metzger, Bucky Lasek, Brian Deegan, and Mat Hoffman. It also features clips from the actual event in Philly, including the finals between Bob Burnquist, and Bucky Lasek, which Bob won by a first ever score of 98, and the crash of Carey Hart, when he attempted the first ever Moto-X Backflip.

== Songs featured in the movie ==
- "Paranoid" by Black Sabbath
- "No Light" by 3rd Strike
- "Alive" by P.O.D.
- "Learn to Fly" by Foo Fighters
- "In Too Deep" by Sum 41 (heard during the end credits)
- "Who's on Your Side" by Pennywise
- "Heaven is a Halfpipe" by OPM

== Interviewees ==
- Tony Hawk
- Travis Pastrana
- Dave Mirra
- T.J. Lavin
- Bucky Lasek
- Jason Ellis
- Brian Deegan
- Ryan Nyquist
- Bob Burnquist
- Mat Hoffman
- Selema Masekela
- Carey Hart
- Cory "Nasty" Nastazio
- Stephen Murray

== Reception ==
Rotten Tomatoes gives the film a rating of 72% from 54 reviews. The consensus summarizes: "Taking full advantage of the large IMAX screen, Ultimate X is a thrill ride for extreme sports junkies and novices alike." Metacritic, which uses a weighted average, assigned the film a score of 60 out of 100, based on 13 critics, indicating "mixed or average" reviews.
