= Drake McElroy =

American motorcycle racer

Personal information
- Nickname: DMC
- Nationality: American
- Born: August 30 1981 Fernley, NV, USA
- Height: 5 ft 8 in (172 cm)
- Weight: 135 lb (61 kg)
- Spouse: Hilary McElroy
- Children: 3

Sport
- Sport: Freestyle motocross (FMX)
- Events: X Games, Gravity Games, Dew Tour, Vans Triple Crown
- Team: smokingseagulls
Medal record
Summer X Games
Representing United States
Bronze medal – third place	2002 Philadelphia	Moto X Freestyle

Drake McElroy (born on August 30, 1981) is an American X Games competitor. He was Bronze Medal Winner in Moto X Freestyle at X Games VIII, held in Philadelphia, Pennsylvania 15–19 August 2002.

== Trick development ==
McElroy is an inventor of the trick "Dead Body", a straight out Bar Hop over the handlebars.

== Events ==
- 2007 Dew Tour, Salt Lake City, UT: 9th
- 2006 Dew Tour, Orlando, FL: 10th
- 2005 IFMA, Salt Lake City, UT - Freestyle: 3rd
- 2005 LG World Championships FMX, Pomona, CA: 8th
- 2004 Vans Triple Crown - Freestyle: 5th
- 2004 LG World Championships FMX: 3rd
- 2003 & 2002 Gravity Games - Freestyle: 4th
- 2003 Vans Triple Crown, Minneapolis, MN - Freestyle: 3rd
- 2003 IFMA, Sacramento, CA: 1st

== X Games competition history ==
GOLD (0) SILVER (0) BRONZE (1)
YEAR	X GAMES	EVENTS	RANK	MEDAL
2000	Summer X Games VI	Moto X Step Up		
2002	Summer X Games VIII	Moto X Freestyle	3rd	Bronze medal
2002	Summer X Games VIII	Moto X Step Up	7th	
2002	Summer X Games VIII	Moto X Big Air	12th	
2003	Winter X Games VII	Moto X Big Air	9th	
2003	Summer X Games IX	Moto X Freestyle	8th	
2003	Summer X Games IX	Moto X Big Air	7th	
2005	Winter X Games IX	Moto X Best Trick	4th	
2005	Summer X Games XI	Moto X Freestyle	9th	

== Gravity Games ==
YEAR	GRAVITY GAMES	LOCATION	EVENTS	RANK	MEDAL
2002	Gravity Games IV	Cleveland, OH	MTX Freestyle	4th	
2003	Gravity Games V	Cleveland, OH	MTX Freestyle	4th	
