= Dayne Kinnaird =

Australian motocross rider

Personal information
- Nickname: Comb-King
- Nationality: Australian
- Born: 16 July 1982 (age 44) Newcastle, New South Wales, Australia
- Height: 177 cm (5 ft 10 in)
- Weight: 63.5 kg (140 lb)
- Spouse: Lara Nisson Kinnaird

Sport
- Sport: Freestyle motocross (FMX)
- Events: X Games, Red Bull X-Fighters
Medal record
Winter X Games
Representing Australia
Silver medal – second place	2003 Aspen	Moto X Big Air

Dayne Kinnaird (born 16 July 1982) is an Australian Freestyle motocross rider for Zoo York Skateboard Company. Kinnaird has been a competitor for 16 years. He has won several competitions. Kinnaird is also a part of the Metal Mulisha, along with Luke Urek, Jeff Kargola, Jeremy Stenberg and Ronnie Faisst.

== Early life ==
Kinnaird was born in Newcastle, New South Wales, Australia on July 16, 1982.

== Career highlights ==
Kinnaird break his elbow at the 2002 WFA Moto-X Championship in Cleveland, Ohio. In 2005, Kinnaird pulled off his first ever backflip at Jeremy Stenberg's home. In August, Kinnaird had injured his right foot after pulling off the Backflip. In 2022, Kinnaird has returned to FMX but is out of action with a busted neck and back.

== Career ==
Kinnaird has been riding for 18 years, then he has been a pro for three years, and his favorite music is Kotton Mouth Kings. Kinnaird's Sponsor is Honda Australia, also his favorite motocross rider is Chad Reed, a fellow Australian Supercross rider and his goal is to beat him. Kinnaird competed in the Crusty Demons 7 and 8 competitions. However Kinnaird went to Annapolis, Maryland, the home of Travis Pastrana and tried to attempht a "Backflip", but unfortunately he accidentally bend his handlebars on his dirt bike. Kinnaird made his first appearance at the 2002 X Games (X Games VIII), Kinnaird qualified in eighth in the Moto X Freestyle Prelims, but unfortunately he finished in seventh in the finals of Moto X Freestyle event, and in the Moto X Big Air, Kinniard debut a combo trick called "Double McMetz", but he finished in fourth, that means no X Games medals from both Freestyle and Big Air events.

At the 2003 Winter X Games, Kinnaird beat the "Backflip" of Caleb Wyatt with a Freestyle combo trick, and he would finish in second, that mean he was the first international rider to win his first ever Winter X Games medal, the Silver medal. Kinnaird and Luke Urek compete in the 2003 X Games Global Championship, but still Kinnaird has finished in third in the Moto X Freestyle event. At the 2004 Winter X Games, Kinniard qualified in third from the Preliems, then in the finals, he tried to do some bigger combo tricks, but he finished in fourth in the Best Trick event. At the 2005 Winter X Games, Jeremy Stenberg has injured his wrist and thumb in a practice run, so Stenberg is out of the competition, so Kinnaird steps in for Twitch, but he tried to do some combo tricks after injured his right foot, but unfortunately Kinnaird finished in seventh, that mean he didn't qualified for the finals in the event. At the 2006 X Games (X Games XII), a French rider named Remi Bizouard didn't have a dirt bike for the Best Trick event, so Kinnaird gave Bizouard his Yamaha YZ250, after that Bizouard crashed so hard on a "Backflip Heart Attack" and finished in 10th. However Kinniard has a favorite Freestyle combo trick called "McMetz to Superman Seat Grab Indian Air".

== Personal life ==
Kinnaird lives in Lake Elsinore, California.

== Events ==
- 2000 Australian X Games - Moto X Freestyle: 3rd
- 2002 WFA Cleveland, OH - Freestyle: 2nd
- 2002 World IFMXF Champion
- 2003 Red Bull X-Fighters - Freestyle: 3rd (Madrid, Spain)
- 2003 X Games Global Championship- Freestyle Motocross: 3rd

== X Games competition history ==
GOLD (0) SILVER (1) BRONZE (0)
YEAR	X GAMES	EVENTS	RANK	MEDAL
2002	Summer X Games VIII	Moto X Freestyle	7th	
2002	Summer X Games VIII	Moto X Big Air	4th	
2003	Winter X Games VII	Moto X Big Air	2nd	Silver medal
2004	Winter X Games VIII	Moto X Best Trick	4th	
2005	Winter X Games IX	Moto X Best Trick	7th	
