= Tommy Clowers =

American motorcycle racer (born 1972)

Personal information
- Nicknames: Textbook, Tom Cat
- Born: September 2, 1972 (age 54) San Diego, California, U.S.
- Height: 5 ft 5 in (165 cm)
- Weight: 150 lb (68 kg)
- Spouse: Melissa Clowers
- Children: 2

Sport
- Sport: Freestyle motocross (FMX)
- Events: Big Air, Step Up, Freestyle
Medal record
Summer X Games
Representing United States
Gold medal – first place	2000 San Francisco	Moto X Step Up
Gold medal – first place	2001 Philadelphia	Moto X Step Up
Gold medal – first place	2002 Philadelphia	Moto X Step Up
Gold medal – first place	2005 Los Angeles	Moto X Step Up
Silver medal – second place	2000 San Francisco	Moto X Freestyle
Silver medal – second place	2003 Los Angeles	Moto X Step Up
Winter X Games
Silver medal – second place	2001 Vermont	Moto X Big Air
Bronze medal – third place	2002 Aspen	Moto X Big Air
Gravity Games
Bronze medal – third place	2001 Providence	Moto X Freestyle

Tommy Clowers (born September 2, 1972) is an American professional FMX (Freestyle motocross) rider. He also a former professional Supercross rider, and the Undisputed King of Step Up.

== Early life ==
Clowers was born in San Diego, California on September 2, 1972.

== Career highlights ==
From 1991 to 1999, Clowers had competed in 125 class Supercross events, and he was riding the Kawasaki, Yamaha, Honda and Suzuki dirt bikes. In 1999, Clowers snapped his wrist in practice at the X Games (X Games V). In 2000, Clowers has won three Step Up wins. Clowers has broken his collarbone in a Step Up event. Clowers has hold the Guinness World Record in Step Up is 25 ft.

== Career ==
Clowers started riding motocross (Moto X) when he was just eight years old. A few months later, he starting competing. In the ten years that followed, he won 14 amateur racing titles. When turned 18, he also turn pro. Clowers has been a huge name in freestyle since 1990. He holding up the championship belt for winning the WFA World Championship in 2000. “Tomcat” was a leading 125cc Supercross racer in the early-to-mid 1990s. Then he later became one of the original stars of Freestyle Motocross in the early 2000s.

At the 2000 X Games (X Games VI), in San Francisco, California, Clowers is the only motocross rider to clear the Step Up bar on his first attempt from 22 ft to 35 ft, then Clowers achieved the highest jump in Moto X Step Up, 10.67 m (35 ft), and he became the first ever Step Up Champion and X Games Gold medalist, Kris Rourke would win the Silver medal and Brian Deegan would win the Bronze medal. Then Clowers qualified in 2nd from the Moto X Freestyle Prelims, as a result, he finished in second and winning his second Summer X Games medal, the Silver medal in Moto X Freestyle finals (Freestyle motocross). At the 2000 Gravity Games, Clowers qualified in second in the Moto X Freestyle prelims, unfortunately Clowers finished 4th in Moto X Freestyle in Providence, Rhode Island.

At the 2001 Winter X Games V, in Mount Snow, Vermont, Clowers pulled off the "Cat Nac" Indian Air and finished 2nd in the debut of Moto X Big Air event, and winning his first ever Winter X Games medal, which is the Silver medal in the event. At the 2001 X Games (X Games VII), Clowers qualified in 3rd from the Prelims, but as a result, Clowers finished in fourth in Moto X Freestyle finals, which mean he didn't win a X Games medal in the event, in Moto X Step Up, Clowers battled Travis Pastrana for the X Games Step Up Gold medal, as a result, Pastrana would fail in his two attempts to clear 33 ft, then Clowers cleared 33 ft on his first attempt and winning his second Moto X Step Up Gold medal and Pastrana would win his first ever X Games Moto X Step Up medal, the Silver medal, also there was a four-way tie for third place or the Bronze medal, which is Jeremy Stenberg, Kris Rourke, Ronnie Renner and Colin Morrison, and also Clowers would finished in 8th in the debut of Moto X Big Air event. At the 2001 Gravity Games, Clowers would finished in third, as a result, he won a first ever Gravity Games medal, which is the Bronze medal in Moto X Freestyle in Providence, Rhode Island.

At the 2002 Winter X Games VI, in Aspen, Colorado, Clowers pulled off the same trick which is the "Cat Nac" Indian Air and finished in 3rd, and winning his second Winter X Games medal, the Bronze medal in the event. At the 2002 Gravity Games, Clowers qualified in fifth, unfortunately Clowers finished in fifth in Moto X Freestyle finals in Cleveland, Ohio. At the 2002 X Games (X Games VIII), Clowers qualified in fourth from the Moto X Freestyle prelims, then he finished in fifth in Moto X Freestyle finals, which mean he didn't win a X Games medal either, in Moto X Step Up, it was down with three riders Metzger, Deegan and the defending champion, Clowers, as the results, Metzger and Deegan didn't clear 34 ft on their two attempts, so on his first attempt, Clowers hit the bar with the front wheel and also bends one of the poles, on his second attempt, Clowers cleared the bar, but he tap the bar with the front wheel as he went over, as a result, he wins his third straight Moto X Step Up Gold medal, after clearing 34 ft and also beats both Mike Metzger and Brian Deegan, as a result Clowers gets his third Gold medal, Metzger, the Godfather of Freestyle Motocross, he wins his second X Games medal, the Silver medal and Deegan wins his second Moto X Step Up medal, the Bronze medal, and in Moto X Big Air, Clowers would finish in 14th.

Clowers was undefeated in Moto X Step Up for three years in a row in 2000, 2001 and 2002, before a young rookie FMX rider Matt Buyten from Minden, Nevada, and defeated Clowers for the X Games Step Up Gold medal at X Games IX (2003), and Clowers has won his first ever Silver medal in the Step Up event, after failing two attempts to clear 32 ft. At the 2004 X Games (X Games X), this was a dream team of these five riders are Brian Deegan, Mike Metzger, Tommy Clowers, the defending 2003 X Games Moto X Step Up Gold Medalist, Matt Buyten and the 7 Time AMA Supercross Champion, Jeremy McGrath. Clowers failed at two attempts at 30 ft, as a result, he would finished third in Moto X Step Up, Buyten failed at first attempt at 33 ft 6 inch, and be would finished 2nd and McGrath would win his first ever X Games Moto X Step Up Gold medal, after clearing 33 ft 6 inch on his first attempt.

At the 2005 X Games (X Games XI), Clowers was riding the Yamaha YZ250, and he and Buyten went face to face from the 2003 X Games, at his first attempt at 31 ft 6 inch, Clowers clip the bar with back wheel, on his second attempt, he cleared the bar, then Clowers would pull off an amazing come back and beat Buyten after clearing 32 ft on his first attempt, and winning his fourth Moto X Step Up Gold medal. After winning his 4th Moto X Step Up Gold medal at X Games XI, in November of 2005, Clowers was getting ready for his wedding and married to his future wife Melissa.

At the 2006 X Games (X Games XII), Clowers failed to defend his Gold medal, on his first attempt at 21 ft, he hit the Step Up bar with the back wheel, on his second attempt, he hit the bar with back wheel again, unfortunately he would finish in fourth, and Buyten would win his second X Games Moto X Step Up Gold medal, after clearing 23 ft on his first attempt. At the 2007 X Games (X Games XIII), Clowers failed at his two attempts to clear 33 ft, would finish in second in Moto X Step Up, but the winner was Ronnie Renner from Leesburg, Florida. Renner debuted the 4-stroke engine, as in the KTM 450 dirt bike in the Moto X Step Up event. At the 2008 X Games (X Games XIV), Clowers tried to clear 32 ft, but failed in his two attempts, unfortunately he would finish in third, as a result Ricky Carmichael, the ten-time AMA Supercross champion would win his first ever Gold medal in the Moto X Step Up event. At his last X Games, which is in 2011 (X Games XVII), Clowers tried to clear 35 ft 6 inch, but failed at his two attempts, but the record was broken by Brian Deegan, as a result, Clowers would finish in fifth in the Step Up event.

Clowers is now officially retired as FMX rider. He has eight X Games medals overall (six medals in XG, two medals in WX).

== Trick development ==
Clowers pulls off some tricks, first he invented the "Catwalk", the running alongside it in the air, it was named after the skateboarding trick known as the "Airwalk". Next he pulls off the "Cat Nac" named after him, but it's like a "No Footed Nac Nac", but hangs out like a "Superman".

== Personal life ==
Clowers lives in Ramona, California.

== Media appearances ==
- MTX Mototrax (2004)
- The Great Ride Open, seasons 1/2 (2007/08)

== Events ==
- 1999 Vans Triple Crown of Freestyle Motocross: 2nd (Las Vegas, Nevada)
- 2000 Vans Triple Crown of Freestyle Motocross: 4th (Las Vegas, Nevada)
- 2008 Red Bull X-Fighters- Freestyle Motocross (San Salvador, El Salvador)

== X Games competition history ==
GOLD (4) SILVER (3) BRONZE (1)
YEAR	X GAMES	EVENTS	RANK	MEDAL
2000	Summer X Games VI	Moto X Step Up	1st	Gold medal
2000	Summer X Games VI	Moto X Freestyle	2nd	Silver medal
2001	Winter X Games V	Moto X Big Air	2nd	Silver medal
2001	Summer X Games VII	Moto X Freestyle	4th	
2001	Summer X Games VII	Moto X Step Up	1st	Gold medal
2001	Summer X Games VII	Moto X Big Air	8th	
2002	Winter X Games VI	Moto X Big Air	3rd	Bronze medal
2002	Summer X Games VIII	Moto X Freestyle	5th	
2002	Summer X Games VIII	Moto X Step Up	1st	Gold medal
2002	Summer X Games VIII	Moto X Big Air	14th	
2003	Winter X Games VII	Moto X Big Air	10th	
2003	Summer X Games IX	Moto X Step Up	2nd	Silver medal
2004	Winter X Games VIII	Moto X Best Trick		
2004	Summer X Games X	Moto X Step Up	3rd	
2005	Summer X Games XI	Moto X Step Up	1st	Gold medal
2006	Summer X Games XII	Moto X Step Up	4th	
2007	Summer X Games XIII	Moto X Step Up	2nd	
2008	Summer X Games XIV	Moto X Step Up	3rd	
2011	Summer X Games XVII	Moto X Step Up	5th	

== Gravity Games ==
YEAR	GRAVITY GAMES	LOCATION	EVENTS	RANK	MEDAL
2000	Gravity Games II	Providence, RI	MTX Freestyle	4th	
2001	Gravity Games III	Providence, RI	MTX Freestyle	3rd	Bronze medal
2002	Gravity Games IV	Cleveland, OH	MTX Freestyle	5th	
