= Evolution Skateboarding =

2002 video game

- PAL region PS2 cover art
- Developer: Konami Computer Entertainment Osaka
- Publisher: Konami
- Platforms: GameCube, PlayStation 2
- Release: NA: October 10, 2002 (PS2); NA: November 17, 2002 (GC); JP: December 12, 2002; PAL: February 21, 2003
- Genre: Sports
- Modes: Single-player, multiplayer

Evolution Skateboarding is a sports video game released by Konami for the GameCube and PlayStation 2 in 2002. It features several popular skateboarders such as Rick McCrank, Arto Saari, Kerry Getz, and Danny Way. There is also a create-a-skater feature and an unlockable character for every skater the player completes the game with. There are also sets of level-specific songs, such as a metal remix of the Metal Gear Solid theme and a Castlevania theme, after unlocking the Vampire Hunter. Levels are unlocked by completing a specific number of objectives in a current level, such as collecting items like boots and other objects, performing tricks in designated areas of a level, and grinding a certain distance. The Evolution Skateboarding engine was used in the bonus skateboarding mode included in the PlayStation 2 version of Metal Gear Solid 2: Substance in 2003.

== Featured skaters ==
Default skaters

- Arto Saari
- Danny Way
- Colin McKay
- Stevie Williams
- Rick McCrank
- Kerry Getz
- Chris Senn

Unlockable skaters

- Gorilla
- Raiden
- Unknown
- Solid Snake
- Frogger
- Gurlukovich 1
- Vampire Hunter
- Gurlukovich 2
- Gray

== Reception ==
Reception

Aggregate score
Aggregator	Score	
Aggregator	GameCube	PS2
Metacritic	44 / 100	44 / 100

Review scores
Publication	Score	
Publication	GameCube	PS2
Famitsu	31 / 40	31 / 40
Game Informer	N/A	5 / 10
GameRevolution	N/A	C−
GameSpot	N/A	4 / 10
GameSpy	N/A	40%
IGN	4.3 / 10	3 / 10
Nintendo Power	3.3 / 5	N/A
Official U.S. PlayStation Magazine	N/A	2.5/5
PlayStation: The Official Magazine	N/A	6 / 10
X-Play	N/A	2/5

The game received "generally unfavorable reviews" on both platforms, according to the review aggregation website Metacritic. Western reviews of the game mostly considered it as a bland rip-off of the Tony Hawk's series of skating games. In Japan, however, Famitsu gave both console versions each a score of 31 out of 40.

== See also ==
- ESPN X Games Skateboarding, previous skateboarding game by Konami
