= Jay Miron =

Canadian bicycle motocross rider

Personal information
- Full name: Jay Lawrence MacNeil Miron
- Nickname: The Canadian Beast
- Born: October 3, 1970 (age 56) Thunder Bay, Ontario, Canada
- Height: 5 ft 7 in (1.70 m)
- Weight: 170 lb (77 kg)

Cycling career
- Sport: Cycling
- Current team: MacNeil
- Discipline: BMX
- Role: Freestyle rider
- Rider type: Flatland, Vert, Dirt, Street

Professional teams
- –: Bully
- –: GT
- –: Hoffman Bikes
- –: Schwinn
- –: MacNeil Bikes
Medal record
Summer X Games
Representing Canada
Gold medal – first place	1995 Newport	BMX Dirt
Silver medal – second place	1996 Newport	BMX Park
Silver medal – second place	1998 San Diego	BMX Park
Silver medal – second place	1998 San Diego	BMV Vert Doubles
Silver medal – second place	1999 San Francisco	BMX Park
Silver medal – second place	1999 San Francisco	BMX Vert
Silver medal – second place	2001 Philadelphia	BMX Vert
Bronze medal – third place	1995 Newport	BMX Vert
Bronze medal – third place	2001 Philadelphia	BMX Park
Gravity Games
Silver medal – second place	1999 Providence	BMX Vert
Bronze medal – third place	1999 Providence	BMX Park
Bronze medal – third place	2000 Providence	BMX Vert
Bronze medal – third place	2002 Cleveland	BMX Vert

Jay Lawrence McNeil Miron (born October 3, 1970) is a Canadian retired BMX athlete and former owner of MacNeil Bikes. He competed in several X-Games competitions since 1995, compiling nine medals, including the first ever X Games gold medal for Bike Dirt. In addition, Miron is credited with inventing more than 30 tricks, including the double backflip and the 540 tailwhip. During his 17-year-long professional career, Miron won six world championship titles. He retired from professional BMX riding in 2005. He sold MacNeil Bikes in 2010 and left the bicycle industry.

In February 2017, Miron started an Instagram account, announcing he was back in the world. He now designs and builds bespoke furniture from his woodworking studio in Vancouver, Canada.

== X Games competition history ==
GOLD (1) SILVER (6) BRONZE (2)
YEAR	X GAMES	EVENTS	RANK	MEDAL
1995	Extreme Games	BMX Dirt	1st	Gold medal
1995	Extreme Games	BMX Vert	3rd	Bronze medal
1996	Summer X Games II	BMX Street	2nd	Silver medal
1996	Summer X Games II	BMX Dirt	4th	
1998	Summer X Games IV	BMX Street	2nd	Silver medal
1998	Summer X Games IV	BMX Dirt	6th	
1998	Summer X Games IV	BMX Vert	4th	
1998	Summer X Games IV	BMX Vert Doubles	2nd	Silver medal
1999	Summer X Games V	BMX Street	2nd	Silver medal
1999	Summer X Games V	BMX Vert	2nd	Silver medal
2000	Summer X Games VI	BMX Park	9th	
2000	Summer X Games VI	BMX Vert	8th	
2001	Summer X Games VII	BMX Park	3rd	Bronze medal
2001	Summer X Games VII	BMX Vert	2nd	Silver medal
2002	Summer X Games VIII	BMX Park	6th	
2002	Summer X Games VIII	BMX Vert	5th	
2003	Summer X Games IX	BMX Park	18th	
2003	Summer X Games IX	BMX Vert	12th	
2004	Summer X Games X	BMX Vert	10th	
2005	Summer X Games XI	BMX Vert	5th	
2005	Summer X Games XI	BMX Vert Best Trick	4th	
