= Clowers =

Clowers is a surname which means "son of the nailer". Notable people with the surname include:

- Bill Clowers (1898–1978), American baseball player
- Clifton Clowers (1891–1994), American farmer featured in the 1962 song "Wolverton Mountain"
- Tommy Clowers (born 1972), American motorcycle racer

== See also ==
- Clower
