= Jeremy Lusk =

American freestyle motocross racer (1984–2009)

Personal information
- Full name: Jeremy Daniel Lusk
- Nicknames: Pitbull, Big L
- Born: November 26, 1984 San Diego, California, U.S.
- Died: February 10, 2009 (aged 24) San José, Costa Rica

Sport
- Sport: Freestyle motocross (FMX)
- Events: Freestyle Moto-X, Best Trick
Medal record
Summer X Games
Representing United States
Gold medal – first place	2008 Los Angeles	Moto X Freestyle
Silver medal – second place	2008 Los Angeles	Moto X Best Trick

Jeremy Daniel Lusk (November 26, 1984 – February 10, 2009) was an American freestyle motocross racer from San Diego, California. He was part of the riding group Metal Mulisha.

Lusk won gold and silver medals at the 2008 X Games and a bronze helmet in the 2008 Moto X World Championships. He was a born-again Christian.

== Career highlights ==
- 2008 X Games Mexico gold, X Games Moto X Best Trick silver, X Games freestyle Gold
- 2008 X Games: Moto X Best Trick, Silver; Moto X Freestyle, Gold
- 2008 Red Bull X Fighters, 3rd
- 2008 Moto X Freestyle, Bronze
- 2008 AST Dew Tour, 3rd

== Death ==
On February 7, 2009, Lusk crashed while attempting to land an "Indian Air Backflip" (after Carey Hart who initiated it, see "Evolution of the backflip" in freestyle motocross) in the X Knights motocross competition in San José, Costa Rica, he under-rotated the flip, causing his front wheel to strike the landing. Lusk was ejected head-first and sustained catastrophic brain damage. Doctors performed an unsuccessful five-hour surgery at Rafael Ángel Calderón Guardia Hospital in San José in an attempt to save his life. He entered into cardiac and respiratory failure and died on February 10.

After his death, the fourth episode of the television show Nitro Circus was dedicated to Lusk.

At the time of his death, Lusk lived in Temecula, California, with his wife, Lauren.
