= Josh Harrington =

American BMX rider

- Harrington airborne

Personal information
- Born: August 21, 1983 (age 43)

Cycling career
- Sport: Cycling
- Discipline: BMX
- Role: Rider

Josh Harrington (born August 21, 1983) is an American BMX rider, from Greenville, North Carolina.

== Contest history ==
2000
UK Urban Games

4th - Street
4th - Vert

2003
1st - Mobile Skatepark Series
4th - Roots Jam Park
2005
1st - Toronto Metro Jam
1st - Vancouver Metro Jam

1st - Best Trick

1st - Gravity Games

2nd - Street

6th - Orlando Dew Tour Park
6th - X-Games Park
7th - Portland Dew Tour Park
2006
1st - Toronto Metro Jam

1st - Best Trick

5th - Louisville Dew Tour Park
6th - LG Action Sports World Championships Park
8th - Denver Dew Tour Vert
2007
1st - Simpel Session

1st - High Air

4th - Cleveland Dew Tour Park
2008

- 5th - Kingston Metro Jam

2011
7th - Simpel Session
8th - X-Games Street
10th - Vegas Dew Tour Park
