= Caleb Wyatt =

American freestyle motocross rider

Caleb Alan Wyatt (born January 1, 1976) is the first person to perform a successful backflip on a large motorcycle. On April 25, 2002, at the Rogue Valley Motocross track (RVMX), Caleb. A photo of Caleb was taken by the RVMX track owner to document the event.

Caleb Wyatt's first successful backflips were performed over a mulch pile of grass clipping, leaves and bark which was originally intended for the maintenance of the RVMX track. Wyatt constructed a quarter pipe ramp with the take-off completely vertical that launched to a step up.

Caleb has since performed this Freestyle Motocross (FMX) trick hundreds of times around the United States. On January 25, 2004, Caleb became the Moto X Best Trick Gold Medal winner during the 8th Winter X-Games, when he bested the competition with a 90-foot-gap (27 m) no-hander backflip. He won X-games a total of three times.
