= Renton Millar =

Australian skateboarder

Renton Millar (born 30 June 1975) is a professional vertical skateboarder from Melbourne, Australia.

== Career ==
Millar is a professional skateboarder, competition announcer and Head Olympic Skateboarding Judge from Melbourne, Australia.

Millar came to prominence in 2001 when his sponsor Globe Shoes video, Opinion was released, sharing a video part with Ben Pappas (1977–2007), and showcased such innovational technical vert skateboarding tricks as 360 flip crooked grind, nollie flip 5-0 and kick flip nose grind shove it on a vert ramp. Between 2000 and 2003 Millar rode for Think skateboards, having several pro model skateboards. In 2009 Millar released a pro board on XEN skateboards.

Turning pro at the World Cup event "The Munster Monster Mastership" in 1998 in Münster, Germany, he competed in many World Cup events such as the X Games (10th place, 2000 Philadelphia), (13th place, 2011, Los Angeles). Gravity Games (9th place 2000, 10th place 2002), Vans Triple Crown (United States), Mystic Cup (Czech Republic, 2nd place 2002, 2004) and Slam City Jam (Vancouver, Canada). In 2003, Millar was Asian X Games Champion (Kuala Lumpur, Malaysia) and in 2005 was Asian X Silver medalist (Seoul, Korea). In 2006 he again won Silver at Asian X Games (Kuala Lumpur, Malaysia). In 2008 Millar won the CPH pro, in Copenhagen Denmark, and competed in the AST Dew tour: placing 6th in Baltimore and 6th in Cleveland (for an 8th place over end result in the standings). In 2009 Millar won the "Oi" Jam in Rio de Janeiro, Brazil, as well as the Timtribu World Cup in Rome, as well as placed 6th at the World Championships of Skateboarding, in the first stop of the AST Dew tour in Boston. After an 8th-place finish at the Toyota Cup in Salt Lake City Millar ended 10th place overall in the end of year AST Dew Tour Standings. In 2009 Millar also placed 3rd at the ESPN Asian XGames in Shanghai, 4th in the AST China Invitational (Beijing), and also won the Chungcheong Korean Xtreme contest.

Millar ended 2009 as World Cup Vert Points Champion, (taking World Cup Points from Rio de Janeiro, Shanghai, Rome, and Berlin). In 2012 Millar won the first Hurley ABC Contest (Australian Bowlriding Championship), becoming the first inaugarel Australian Bowlriding Champion.

Millar made a guest appearance in Australian soap opera Neighbours in 2002.

He also had his own short show on Fuel TV Australia, called "Bailgun Diary" and has hosted such shows as "Bondi Bowlarama". Millar has also been a long time campaigner for a skatepark to be built on the foreshore of StKilda in Victoria.

Between 2015 and 2018, Millar served as the live MC for Bondi Bowl-a-Rama and acted as the lead announcer for the 2018 X Games in Sydney. He transitioned into commentary and analysis for the 2021 X Games (Vert and Mega Park) held at the Sloan Yard in San Diego.

Millar has extensive experience as a technical official, judging X Games Vert and MegaRamp events in Austin, Texas, as well as multiple stops of the Vans Park Series in Melbourne and Shanghai. In 2018, he began working with World Skate as a park and vert judge, eventually serving as a judge for the Park event at the 2020 Tokyo Olympics (held in 2021).

In 2022, Millar was appointed Head Judge of Park for World Skate. In this capacity, he served as the Head Judge for the 2024 Paris Olympics. In 2026, Millar was awarded the Medal of the Order of Australia (OAM) for his significant service to skateboarding. (https://www.theage.com.au/national/victoria/fifty-years-of-getting-the-church-on-time-and-other-honours-recipients-20260122-p5nwaa.html

== Personal life ==
Renton Millar is separated from Chelsie Millar, and has two children, Bonnie and Max. and has two children.
