= Clower =

Clower is a surname, occupational for a nailer. Notable people with the surname include:

- Jerry Clower (1926–1998), American comedian
- Robert W. Clower (1926–2011), American economist

== See also ==
- Clowers
