= Jeff Kargola =

American freestyle motocross racer (1983–2011)

Personal information
- Nickname: Ox
- Born: November 29, 1983 Laguna Beach, California, U.S.
- Died: April 29, 2011 (aged 27) Baja California, Mexico
- Height: 6 ft 2 in (188 cm)
- Weight: 200 lb (91 kg)

Sport
- Sport: Freestyle motocross (FMX)
- Events: Best Trick, Freestyle, Step Up, Speed & Style
Medal record
Winter X Games
Representing United States
Silver medal – second place	2005 Aspen	Moto X Best Trick

Jeff "Ox" Kargola (November 29, 1983 – April 29, 2011) was an American professional freestyle motocross (FMX) rider. He was a member of the Metal mulisha FMX team.

Kargola's career was highlighted by a silver medal in the Men's Best Trick competition at the 2005 Winter X Games.

Kargola died on April 29, 2011, aged 27, after sustaining a head injury and internal bleeding on the second day of the Desert Assassins' Rip to the Tip motocross event in Baja California, Mexico.

== X Games competition history ==
GOLD (0) SILVER (1) BRONZE (0)
X Games 2010	MTX Speed & Style	10th	
X Games 2010	MTX Step Up	5th	
X Games 2010	MTX Freestyle	11th	
Winter X 2006	MTX Best Trick	9th	
Winter X 2005	MTX Best Trick	2nd	Silver medal
X Games 2004	MTX Best Trick	5th	
Winter X 2004	MTX Best Trick	10th	
X Games 2002	MTX Best Trick	17th	
Winter X 2002	MTX Best Trick	9th	
X Games 2001	MTX Best Trick	16th	
