= Ryan Nyquist =

American bicycle motocross rider

Personal information
- Nickname: "Triple Threat"
- Born: March 6, 1979 (age 47) Los Gatos, California, U.S.
- Height: 5 ft 6 in (168 cm)
- Weight: 160 lb (73 kg)
- Spouse: Ali Schoen Nyquist (m. 2007)
- Children: 3

Sport
- Sport: BMX, Freeride
- Rank: 16 X Games medals, Overall Champion (Dew Tour (dirt) Champion, ABA King of dirt Champion, DK dirt circuit, VANS triple crown of bmx, HSA...) and some other medals. For MTB, he won some medals (Red Bull, FISE, Crankworx...)
- Event(s): X Games, Dew Tour, Red Bull Joyride, Red Bull Dreamline, Crankworx
Medal record
Summer X Games
Representing United States
Gold medal – first place	2000 San Francisco	BMX Dirt
Gold medal – first place	2002 Philadelphia	BMX Park
Gold medal – first place	2003 Los Angeles	BMX Dirt
Gold medal – first place	2003 Los Angeles	BMX Park
Silver medal – second place	1998 San Diego	BMX Dirt
Silver medal – second place	2001 Philadelphia	BMX Dirt
Silver medal – second place	2002 Philadelphia	BMX Dirt
Silver medal – second place	2004 Los Angeles	BMX Park
Silver medal – second place	2006 Los Angeles	BMX Dirt
Silver medal – second place	2012 Los Angeles	BMX Park
Silver medal – second place	2013 Barcelona	BMX Park
Bronze medal – third place	1997 San Diego	BMX Dirt
Bronze medal – third place	1999 San Francisco	BMX Dirt
Bronze medal – third place	2000 San Francisco	BMX Park
Bronze medal – third place	2005 Los Angeles	BMX Park
Bronze medal – third place	2013 Foz do Igauçu	BMX Dirt
Gravity Games
Gold medal – first place	1999 Providence	BMX Dirt
Gold medal – first place	2001 Providence	BMX Park
Gold medal – first place	2003 Cleveland	BMX Dirt
Gold medal – first place	2004 Cleveland	BMX Dirt
Silver medal – second place	1999 Providence	BMX Park
Silver medal – second place	2000 Providence	BMX Park
Silver medal – second place	2002 Cleveland	BMX Park
Silver medal – second place	2003 Cleveland	BMX Park

Ryan Nyquist (born March 6, 1979) is an American professional BMX rider with 16 X Games medals, 39 X Games competition starts and 60 Dew Tour finals appearances (most all-time). Nyquist is considered one of the greatest and diversely skilled BMX riders ever. Nyquist has won numerous gold medals in the X Games Dirt Jumping & Bike Park events. Recently Nyquist has had an interest in freeride mountain biking and has been training in mountain biking as well as BMX. He currently rides for Haro Bikes, Vans Shoes, Rockstar Energy Drink, and The Jiffy Market of Los Gatos.

== Personal life ==
After living in Greenville, North Carolina for a period, Nyquist returned to the San Jose, California area where he lived with his wife and sons for a while. As of 2018, Nyquist lives in Wilmington, NC.

== Career ==
Ryan Nyquist has been a professional BMX rider since 1995 and first competed in the X Games in 1996. Recognised as one of the best contest riders in the history of BMX, he has been a regular top finisher for over fifteen years and is renowned for his groundbreaking barspin variations. In 2006, Nyquist performed in Cirque Rocks, a charity circus held in New Zealand.

In 2015, Nyquist expressed interest in Slopestyle Mountain Biking. By 2016, he trained rigorously to compete in Crankworx, later qualifying for a spot at Red Bull Joyride, where he placed in the top 10 out of 18 riders. He also became the first rider to use pegs on a mountain bike during an event. During his BMX off-season, Nyquist competes in Freeride Slopestyle mountain biking, quickly becoming one of the top competitors. He achieved a bronze medal in the slopestyle mountain bike premier Red Bull Joyride event in 2017 and placed 4th overall in the prestigious FMB Diamond Series that same year.

While Nyquist has focused on mountain biking in recent years, he planned to rededicate himself to park riding, qualifying for the inaugural 2020 Tokyo Summer Olympics. In September 2019, it was announced that he would become the first Head Coach of Team USA’s Olympic BMX Freestyle team.

== X Games competition history ==
GOLD (4) SILVER (7) BRONZE (5)
YEAR	X GAMES	EVENTS	RANK	MEDAL
1997	Summer X Games III	BMX Street	5th	
1997	Summer X Games III	BMX Dirt	3rd	Bronze medal
1998	Summer X Games IV	BMX Street	4th	
1998	Summer X Games IV	BMX Dirt	2nd	Silver medal
1998	Summer X Games IV	BMX Vert Doubles	4th	
1999	Summer X Games V	BMX Street	5th	
1999	Summer X Games V	BMX Dirt	3rd	Bronze medal
1999	Summer X Games V	BMX Vert	9th	
2000	Summer X Games VI	BMX Park	3rd	Bronze medal
2000	Summer X Games VI	BMX Dirt	1st	Gold medal
2001	Summer X Games VII	BMX Park	7th	
2001	Summer X Games VII	BMX Dirt	2nd	Silver medal
2002	Summer X Games VIII	BMX Park	1st	Gold medal
2002	Summer X Games VIII	BMX Dirt	2nd	Silver medal
2003	Summer X Games IX	BMX Park	1st	Gold medal
2003	Summer X Games IX	BMX Dirt	1st	Gold medal
2004	Summer X Games X	BMX Park	2nd	Silver medal
2004	Summer X Games X	BMX Dirt	8th	
2005	Summer X Games XI	BMX Park	3rd	Bronze medal
2005	Summer X Games XI	BMX Dirt	10th	
2006	Summer X Games XII	BMX Dirt	2nd	Silver medal
2007	Summer X Games XIII	BMX Park	6th	
2008	Summer X Games XIV	BMX Park	11th	
2010	Summer X Games XVI	BMX Park	14th	
2011	Summer X Games XVII	BMX Park	10th	
2012	Summer X Games XVIII	BMX Park	2nd	Silver medal
2013	X Games Foz do Iguaçu 2013	BMX Park	7th	
2013	X Games Foz do Iguaçu 2013	BMX Dirt	3rd	Bronze medal
2013	X Games Barcelona 2013	BMX Park	2nd	Silver medal
2013	X Games Munich 2013	BMX Park	7th	
2014	X Games Austin 2014	BMX Park	5th	
2014	X Games Austin 2014	BMX Dirt	10th	
2015	X Games Austin 2015	BMX Park	12th	
2015	X Games Austin 2015	BMX Dirt	5th	
2016	X Games Austin 2016	BMX Dirt	9th	
2016	X Games Austin 2016	BMX Park	5th	
2017	X Games Minneapolis 2017	BMX Dirt	8th	
2018	X Games Minneapolis 2018	BMX Dirt	11th	

== Awards ==
=== 2002 ===
- X Games - BMX Park Champion

=== 2003 ===
- Triple Crown of BMX - Park Champion
- Triple Crown of BMX - Dirt Champion

=== 2004 ===
- ESPY - Best Action Sports

=== 2007 ===
- AST Dew Tour BMX Dirt Dew Cup Champion

=== 2009 ===
- AST Dew Tour BMX Dirt Dew Cup Champion

=== 2012 ===
- Gold Medal - Grand Palais BMX Contest - Red Bull Skyline

=== 2013 ===
- AST Dew Tour BMX Park Dew Cup Champion

=== 2014 ===
- 1st Place - Red Bull Dreamline 2014

=== 2017 ===
- 3rd Place - Red Bull Joyride, Whistler 2017

=== 2018 ===
- 2nd Place - Wipperfürt BMX Contest 2018
- 1st place tie with Pat "the cat" Skate Cary Competition 2018

=== 2024 ===
- Fishbowl Team Win - Team member
- 1st Place - Interior Cake Signage Placement Contest

== Other ==
In 2003, Nyquist played himself on an episode of The Jersey called "The New Kid in Town" where he switches bodies with a boy named Elliott Rifkin (played by Theo Greenway) as he has to spend the afternoon with a new kid at school who has a chip on his shoulder.

Nyquist was featured on MTV Cribs and made a guest appearance as himself on the cartoon Kim Possible.
