= Carey Hart =

American freestyle motocross, motorcycle and off-road truck racer

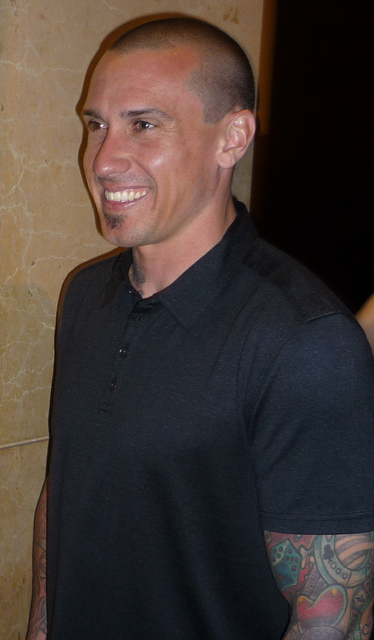
- Hart in 2010
- Born: Carey Jason Phillip Hart; July 17, 1975 (age 51); Seal Beach, California, U.S.
- Occupations: Motorcycle racer, freestyle motocross competitor, off-road racer, businessman
- Years active: 1993–present
- Height: 5 ft 11 in (180 cm)
- Spouse: Pink (m. 2006)
- Children: 2

Medal record

Summer X Games

Representing United States
Silver medal – second place	2002 Philadelphia	Moto X Big Air

Gravity Games
Bronze medal – third place	1999 Providence	Moto X Freestyle

Carey Jason Phillip Hart (born July 17, 1975) is an American off-road truck racer, former professional freestyle motocross competitor, and former motorcycle racer. He was the first motorcyclist to attempt a backflip on a 250cc motorcycle during a competition, and founded Hart & Huntington Tattoo Co.

== Career ==
Hart became a professional motorcyclist at 18 and started competing in the AMA supercross circuit. Two years before, he had sustained two broken femurs, broken tibia and fibula as well as fractured wrists, after he was blind-sided by a tractor working on the track he was riding on, smashing straight into the vehicle. Hart was among the first riders to begin competing in freestyle motocross in 1996. Hart was the first rider to publicly perform BMX trick the "superman seat grab" at IFMA events in 1998–99. He was also the first person to perform the "invert superman" seat grab at the 1999 Gravity Games in Providence, Rhode Island. This trick is now known as the "Hart Attack". In 1999, Hart took home the bronze medal at the Summer Gravity Games and Gold at the Australian X Games.

During the 2000 Gravity Games in Providence, Rhode Island, Hart attempted the first back flip on a 250 cc motorcycle in competition. Hart is credited with the first "attempt" of a backflip as he over-rotated his flip and suffered a hard landing, displacing him off the seat. The year 2000 saw Hart win several FMX competitions and honors including the Silver at the Las Vegas LXD Freeride MotoX and Toyota's Trick of the Week.

At the 2001 X Games in Philadelphia, Hart attempted the backflip again for the best trick competition but suffered a bad crash coming off his bike at the beginning of the rotation. His injuries included several broken bones and ribs along with a bruised tailbone. It was there he met his future wife, singer Pink. In 2002, Hart again picked up the gold medal at the Australian X Games as well as gaining the silver medal in the MotoX Best Trick at the Summer X Games in Los Angeles. The same year, Hart participated in the Tony Hawk's Boom Boom HuckJam tour.

At the 2002 X-Games in Philadelphia, Hart successfully completed the backflip in the best trick competition picking up the silver medal behind Mike Metzger, who landed a no-footed backflip. The same year, Hart participated in the Gumball 3000, an annual British 3,000-mile (4,800 km) international road rally which takes place on public roads. 2003's route was from San Francisco to Miami. He is also featured in the film Gumball 3000; The Movie. The biographical documentary Goodtimes With Carey Hart was also released in 2003. Hart again participated in the Tony Hawk's Boom Boom HuckJam tour, but was seriously injured on the first night, having to bail into the scaffolding to avoid hitting a skater after the mistiming of their jumps. Hart broke both his arms and legs as well as suffering severe blood clotting during surgery. The crash took him out of competition for three years.

In 2004, Hart and John Huntington opened Hart & Huntington Tattoo Company in Las Vegas. A&E network followed Hart and the workings of the shop on the reality show Inked. Hart and Huntington Tattoo Company also launched a clothing line based on the designs of the artists at the store. With H&H's expansion, the clothing line is now based on the tattoo/action sports lifestyle and culture. Soon after the opening of the Las Vegas store, John Huntington sold his 48 percent ownership back to Hart. In 2006, Huntington filed a lawsuit against Carey, alleging he owed large amounts of money for his trademark and likeness. Hart reportedly hired high-profile Las Vegas attorney Gene Porter to resolve the case through mediation, which was ultimately successful.

In 2005 Hart was the host for ABC's Live's X Games FMX coverage and was a cast member on the fifth season of the VH1 reality show The Surreal Life. In 2006, two Hart & Huntington Tattoo Company stores opened in Hawaii and Cabo. Hart again took part in Gumball 3000, which saw the drivers race from London to Los Angeles.

In 2007, Hart formed his first supercross team, the H&H/Rockstar Moto Team, which included him as a team rider, Hart finished 12th in 2007 AMA Supermoto Series. Kenny Watson has been team manager from the beginning. In 2011, Hart welcomed a new title sponsor Dodge Motorsports, which allowed him to enter the Supercross space for the first time. It was also in 2007 that the Hart & Huntington Orlando store was opened in the Universal CityWalk complex.

In July 2008, Hart teamed up with Cory McCormack, Jason Giambi, Benji Madden and Joel Madden to create Las Vegas nightclub "Wasted Space". The club was designed by Hart, McCormack and Zeff Design. Wasted Space was voted Best New Bar in Vegas 2008. Also in 2008, Hart released "Inked: The book" which covered individuals stories behind their tattoos, including Carey's own story and his father's Tom Hart. In late 2008 Hart & Huntington's Cabo store was closed.

In 2009, Hart teamed up with Premiere MotorSports Group (PMG) to launch the Hart and Huntington Off-Road team which is a Short Course Truck Team led by Ryan Busnardo, Nick Kilian and Scot Demmer. Hart became attracted to the sport previously from being a fan of CORR (Championship Off-Road Racing Series) which ended in 2008. Hart and Huntington Off-Road secured over 40 podium finishes. Hart competed in the Lucas Oil Off Road Racing Series driving for the Team in the Unlimited 2 category (known in the past as a PRO 2), finishing 6th in Lucas Oil Off Road Racing Series and was nominated "Rookie of the Year" in LOORR Series.

In April 2009, H&H moved to a bigger store inside the Hard Rock Hotel & Casino in Las Vegas and created the Hart & Huntington Freestyle tour, which toured alongside Pink's arena tour in Australia. In 2010, Hart & Huntington opened a store in Niagara Falls, Canada. In August of the same year, Wasted Space closed to make way for the Hard Rock's new race and sports book. In 2011, Hart was awarded the 1st R.A.D. Lifetime achievement award. and hosted of MTV2's “Burn Out” series. In 2011, H&H Hawaii closed.

Prior to the 2012 X Games, Hart announced his participation of the Moto X Speed & Style event would be his last competition. Hart got to the quarter-finals but was eliminated by Edgar Torronteras.

For 2013, Hart announced the joining forces of Hart's Dodge/Sycuan Casino Racing team with Ricky Carmichael and factory support from Suzuki and Yoshimura research and development forming 'RCH Racing'.

During Hart's career, he has been featured in nationwide ad campaigns for Ford, Dunkin' Donuts, Fox Racing, DVS and Mountain Dew as well as in such print publications as Paper Magazine, Teen People, ESPN The Magazine, Rolling Stone, Prick and, Skinnie, and has been on the covers of numerous motocross and tattoo magazines.

Hart has made cameos in several music videos, including Kid Rock's video "Bawitdaba" wherein he is shown jumping a trailer park, He has appeared in Pink's "Just Like a Pill", "So What", "Raise Your Glass", "Just Give Me a Reason", and "True Love" videos. On the 2000 Australian Warped Tour, he played bass with the band Pennywise.

Hart has also appeared on the Late Show with David Letterman, Inked, MTV's Life of Ryan, Rove Live (Australia), appeared on The Today Show, was a guest in Talkin' 'bout Your Generation and has starred in several films including ESPN/Touchstone Pictures’ IMAX film, Ultimate X, Terrafirma 5, Frenzno Smooth, Flipped Out, Crush: A Transworld Motocross Film, Seth II and several of the "Crusty Demons" series. He also has had cameo appearances in xXx and Charlie's Angels: Full Throttle.

== Personal life ==
Hart was raised in Las Vegas. His parents divorced when he was very young. He and his younger brother, Anthony "Tony" Hart, were raised by their father, construction company owner Tom Hart. He is the oldest of three siblings.

Hart began dating singer Pink after meeting her in Philadelphia, Pennsylvania, at the 2001 X Games. After four years of dating, Pink proposed to Hart in June 2005 via a pit board during one of his races in Mammoth Lakes, California. She held up a sign that read, "Will you marry me?" At first, Hart ignored Pink and completed another lap of the race; it was only when she changed the sign to read, "I'm serious!" that Hart pulled out of the race to pick her up. They married at the Four Seasons resort in Costa Rica on January 7, 2006.

The couple announced in February 2008 that they had separated. In August 2008, during the couple's separation, Carey's brother Tony died due to injuries sustained in a motocross competition. Despite their separation, Pink supported Hart through the loss. Following Tony's death, the Hart family formed the XTRM Hart Foundation for a brief fundraising effort in his memory.

In March 2009, Hart stated he and Pink were "dating". He also said the couple was attempting to work things out, stating, "Sometimes you have to take a couple of steps back to move forward". In April 2009, Pink stated that the couple had gone to marriage counseling and were back together.

In June 2011, Hart and Pink welcomed their first child. Their second child was born in December 2016.

== Career history and achievements ==
- 2012 X Games XVIII: Speed and Style Quarter Finalist
- 2011 Riders Above Dirt: Lifetime Achievement Award
- 2011 X Games XVII: Speed and Style 4th place
- 2011 Dodge Viper Celebrity Challenge
- 2010 Lucas Oil Off Road Racing Series: 18th in Unlimited 2 division
- 2009 Lucas Oil Off Road Racing Series: 6th in Unlimited 2 division
- 2009 Lucas Oil Off Road Racing Series: "Rookie of the Year" nomination
- 2009 Lucas Oil Off Road Racing Series: "Team of the Year"
- 2009 X Games Supermoto: 19th place
- 2008 X Games Supermoto: 17th place
- 2007 AMA Supermoto Championship: 12th place
- 2007 X Games XIII Supermoto: 15th place
- 2007 AMA Supermoto Championship: 10th place
- 2006 Gumball 3000: Participated
- 2006 X Games XII Supermoto: 14th place
- 2006 AMA Supermoto Championship: 21st place
- 2003 Gumball 3000: Participated
- 2002 Australian X Games: Gold Medal
- 2002 X Games VIII / Moto X events: Silver Medal, Best Trick ("Big Air")
- 2001 AMA Supermoto Championship: 7th place
- 2001 Summer X Games VII: 15th place Best Trick ("Big Air")
- 2000 Gravity Games: First-ever backflip attempt on a 250cc motorcycle during a competition
- 2000 Gravity Games: 10th place "Freestyle"
- 2000 Mountain Dew: "Trick of the Week"
- 2000 Freeride Moto-X Championship: 5th place
- 2000 LXD FreeRide Moto-X Championship: Silver Medal
- 1999 Gravity Games: Bronze Medal, "Freestyle"
- 1999 First performed "Invert Superman", later renamed to the "Hart Attack"
- 1999 Vans Triple Crown of Freestyle Motocross (San Francisco): 4th place
- 1999 Vans Triple Crown of Freestyle Motocross (San Diego): 8th place
- 1999 Freestyle MX Challenge by 4 Leaf Entertainment: 4th place
- 1999 Australian X Games: Gold Medal
- 1999 Costa Mesa LXD Freeride MotoX: Gold Medal, ("Best Whip")
- 1999 Costa Mesa LXD Freeride MotoX: Bronze Medal
- 1999 Costa Rican Supercross: Gold Medal
- 1999 LXD Orange County Jump Contest: Bronze Medal
- 1998 Free Air Festival (Las Vegas): Silver Medal

== Filmography ==
=== Film ===
Year	Title	Role	Notes
1996	Crusty Demons of Dirt 2	Himself	
1998	Crusty Demons of Dirt 4: God Bless The Freaks	Himself	
1999	Frenzno Smooth	Himself	
1999	Kid Rock’s 'Bawitdaba'	Himself	Music Video
1999	Terrafirma 5	Himself	
2001	Crusty Demons of Dirt 3	Himself	
2002	Ultimate X: The Movie	Himself	Documentary Film
2002	Pink's 'Just Like A Pill'	Himself	Music Video
2002	XXX	Caddy Passenger	
2003	Crusty Demons of Dirt: Nine Lives	Himself	
2003	Gumball 3000: The Movie	Himself	
2003	Tony Hawk's Boom Boom HuckJam DVD	Himself	
2003	Flipped Out	Himself	Documentary Film
2003	Charlie's Angels: Full Throttle	Himself	Cameo
2003	Goodtimes with Carey Hart	Himself	Documentary Film
2003	Girls of the Games: Ultimate X	Himself	
2003	No Fear: Chapter One	Himself	
2004	Seth II	Himself	
2004	Crush: A Transworld Motocross Film	Himself	
2008	Pink's 'So What'	Himself	Music Video
2010	Pink's 'Raise Your Glass'	Himself	Music Video
2013	Pink's 'Just Give Me a Reason'	Himself	Music Video
2013	Pink's 'True Love'	Himself	Music Video
2016	Pink's 'Just Like Fire (From the Original Motion Picture "Alice Through The Looking Glass")'	Himself	Music Video
2021	Pink’s ‘All I Know So Far’	Himself	Music video

=== Television ===
Year	Title	Role	Notes
2001	Ripley's Believe It or Not!	Himself	SE2 EP1
2003	MTV Cribs	Himself	SE7 EP1
2003	The David Letterman Show	Himself	S10 EP181
2003	Punk'd	Himself	SE1 EP7
2004	M80	Himself	TV series
2005–2006	Inked	Himself	TV series
2005	Surreal Life	Himself	TV series
2005	ABC's Live X Games FMX coverage	Himself	Host/Commentator
2006	101 Guiltiest Guilty Pleasures	Himself	
2006	E! True Hollywood Story	Himself	TV documentary
2006	The Best Damn Sports Show Period	Himself	
2007	Life of Ryan	Himself	TV series
2009	Talkin' 'bout Your Generation	Himself	SE1 EP13
2009	Behind The Music	Himself	TV documentary
2009	Rove Live	Himself	SE10 EP17
2009	Nitro Circus	Himself	SE1 EP3, SE1 EP22
2009	Chelsea Lately	Himself	TV Chat Show
2010	Biography	Himself	TV documentary
2011	MTV2's "Burn Out"	Himself	Host
2011	The Real World	Himself	SE24 EP3
2012	Network A's Ink Rock Moto	Himself	Online Series
2025	Special Forces: World's Toughest Test	Himself	SE3, TV series
