= Vince Byron =

Australian BMX rider (born 1990)

Vince Byrom
Personal information
- Nationality: Australian
- Born: 11 May 1990 (age 36) Australia
- Occupation: BMX rider

Vince Byron (born 11 May 1990) is an Australian BMX rider. He competed at X-Games in Big Air and Vert.

== Contest history ==
Before his X Games success he won two third place at the X Games in 2007 and 2008. He won the gold at T-Mobile Extreme Playgrounds Vert in 2010. It is at Dew Tour where his successes begin, he won some medals (two second place, two third place and one first place). He is a Mega Ramp (or Big Air) specialist. He won a 2nd place and 3rd place in 2011.

Byron has competed in numerous X Games, most recently competing in the 2017 X Games where he took another Gold medal in Vert and Silver medal in Big Air. At the 2015 X Games, Byron won the gold in the BMX Vert, beating nine-time winner Jamie Bestwick. Byron has also won gold four times at the KIA World Extreme Games. He also won the Vert Mission in 2017. At the 2014 event, Byron became the first person to ever land a 540 flair in a vert competition.

X Games Medal Count: 4 Gold, 6 Silver, 4 Bronze
