= Stephen Murray (BMX rider) =

English bicycle motocross rider

Personal information
- Full name: Stephen Murray
- Nationality: British
- Born: 9 January 1980 (age 46) Newcastle, England
- Height: 6 ft 0 in (183 cm)
- Weight: 208 lb (94 kg)
- Spouse: Melissa Murray
- Children: 2 sons
- Website: www.stysrg.com/stephen.html

Sport
- Sport: BMX Dirt
- Disability: Paralysis
Medal record
Representing United Kingdom
Summer X Games
Gold medal – first place	2001 Philadelphia	BMX Dirt
Gravity Games
Gold medal – first place	2001 Providence	BMX Dirt
Gold medal – first place	2002 Cleveland	BMX Dirt
Bronze medal – third place	2004 Cleveland	BMX Dirt
- Updated on 14 December 2016

Stephen Murray (born 9 January 1980) is an English former BMX Dirt rider.

== Biography ==
On Friday 22 June 2007, at the AST Dew Tour BMX Dirt Finals in Baltimore, Murray took a catastrophic fall attempting a double backflip on the final jump in the dirt section. He suffered career-ending injuries to his spinal cord and vertebrae, and became paralyzed below the shoulders. Reports have shown that he can shrug his shoulders, move his toes, his index fingers, and his thumbs.

Murray was a seven-time expert British champion and six-time UK National champion before the age of 16. During his professional BMX career, he was known for his double back flips (the first rider to land in competition), 360 back flips, and turndown back flips. He won the gold medal in BMX Dirt in the Summer 2001 X Games and won gold medals in BMX Dirt at the Gravity Games in back-to-back years (2001 and 2002). He was nominated for ESPN 'BMX rider of the year'.

Since the accident, Murray worked closely with the doctor who treated Christopher Reeve after the actor's accident left him quadriplegic. He now has limited movement in his toes and is also gaining more movements in his hands. He hopes to move to a hand-operated wheelchair in the future.

He is no longer married, but has full custody of his two sons. He resides in Evesham, England.

Murray appeared on the True Geordie Podcast to talk openly about his experience, and the journey of his life. His motivations and dealing with the crash were explored as well.

In 2017, he published a book about his life: Staying Strong: An Immensely Human Story (with John F. McDonald, Lee Martin).

== ESPN ==
- BMX Rider of the Year

== BMX Championships ==
- Seven-time expert British champion
- Six-time UK National champion

== X Games competition history ==
GOLD (1) SILVER (0) BRONZE (0)
YEAR	X GAMES	EVENTS	RANK	MEDAL
2001	Summer X Games VII	BMX Dirt	1st	Gold medal
2002	Summer X Games VIII	BMX Dirt	11th	
2003	Summer X Games IX	BMX Dirt	4th	
2004	Summer X Games X	BMX Dirt	10th	

== Gravity Games ==
YEAR	GRAVITY GAMES	LOCATION	EVENTS	RANK	MEDAL
2001	Gravity Games III	Providence, RI	BMX Dirt	1st	Gold medal
2002	Gravity Games IV	Cleveland, OH	BMX Dirt	1st	Gold medal
2003	Gravity Games V	Cleveland, OH	BMX Dirt	10th	
2004	Gravity Games VI	Cleveland, OH	BMX Dirt	3rd	Bronze medal
