= Martina Svobodová =

Slovak aggressive inline skater (born 1983)

Martina Svobodová (born 25 October 1983 in Bratislava) is a Slovak aggressive inline skater who has received gold and silver medals at the X Games as well as other international [inline skating competitions.

She won the international Winterclash competition 2008 in Mühlhausen, Germany.

== X Games medals ==
- Park-X-Games
  - 2002: 1st Place Women (Gold)
  - 2001: 1st Place Women (Gold)
  - 2000: 2nd Place Women (Silver)

== Winterclash Results ==
- 2008: 1st Place Girls at Winterclash
