= Garrett Reynolds (BMX rider) =

American BMX rider

Personal information
- Born: August 2, 1990 (age 35) Toms River, New Jersey, U.S.

Sport
- Country: United States
- Sport: Freestyle BMX, Dirt jumping
- Rank: 2 X-games medals / Numerous FISE (Red Bull events, Vans Pro Cup....)
- Event(s): X Games, Dew Tour

Garrett Reynolds (born August 2, 1990) is an American BMX Dirt and Freestyle rider from Gold Coast.

Reynolds debuted at the X Games 2007 BMX Park 4th the first rookie to score a BMX Park medal since Brazilian Diogo Canina in 2006.

In 2007, Reynolds took gold at X Games Brazil, X Games Mexico and X Games Dubai, finishing fourth in the X Games 13 street contest.

== Career highlights ==
- X Games 2007 BMX Park 4th
- X Games 2008 BMX Street 1st
- X Games 2009 BMX Park 11th
- X Games 2009 BMX Street 1st
- X Games 2009 BMX Park 11th
- X Games 2010 BMX Street 1st
- X Games 2010 BMX Park 13th
- X Games 2011 BMX Park 6th
- X Games 2011 BMX Street 1st
- X Games Los Angeles 2012 BMX Street 1st
- X Games Barcelona 2013 BMX Street 1st
- X Games Los Angeles 2013 BMX Street 2nd
- X Games Austin 2014 BMX Street 1st
- World of X Real BMX 2016 BMX Real BMX 1st
- X Games Minneapolis 2017 BMX Street 1st
- X Games Minneapolis 2017 BMX Street 1st
- X Games Minneapolis 2018 BMX Street 2nd
- X Games Sydney 2018 BMX Street 3rd
- X Games Shanghai 2019 BMX Street 1st
- X Games Minneapolis 2019 BMX Street 1st
- World of X Real BMX 2020 BMX Real BMX 1st
