= Bruce Hendricks =

American film director and film producer

Bruce Hendricks is an American film director and film producer. In 1985, Hendricks joined the Walt Disney Company as an associate producer and production manager. Remaining with the company, in 1999 Hendricks was named the President of Physical Production. There he oversaw the production of over 250 motion pictures, developing projects including the Pirates of the Caribbean franchise and National Treasure. He left Disney in 2011 as the company planned to scale back physical features.

In 2021, he optioned the rights to “Lunatic at Large”, an unmade film by the late director Stanley Kubrick.

Hendricks currently serves on the committee for the Nicholl Fellowships in Screenwriting.

== Filmography ==
Director

- Ultimate X: The Movie (2002)
- Hannah Montana & Miley Cyrus: Best of Both Worlds Concert (2008)
- Jonas Brothers: The 3D Concert Experience (2009)

Executive producer

- Pearl Harbor (2001)
- Pirates of the Caribbean: The Curse of the Black Pearl (2003)
- Pirates of the Caribbean: Dead Man's Chest (2006)
- Pirates of the Caribbean: At World's End (2007)
- Hannah Montana & Miley Cyrus: Best of Both Worlds Concert (2008)
