= Kerry Getz =

American professional skateboarder (born 1975)

Personal information
- Nickname: Hockey Temper
- Born: June 10, 1975 (age 49)
- Years active: 1998–present
- Height: 5 ft 8 in (173 cm)
- Children: 6

Sport
- Country: United States
- Sport: Skateboarding

Kerry Getz (born June 10, 1975) is an American professional skateboarder.

== Biography ==
Getz has been skateboarding since the age of nine. Alongside Fred Gall, Tim O'Conner and Rob Pluhowski, Getz was one of the original team members of the Habitat brand that was originally conceived as an offshoot of the Alien Workshop skateboard company. However, in the announcement of Habitat's move to the Tum Yeto distribution company, Getz's name does not appear in the team list.

Getz is known for his anger issues towards his skateboarding, earning him the nickname "Hockey Temper". A montage of his outbursts appears in the introduction to his Skate More video part for the DVS Shoes company.

As of December 2014, Getz's sponsors are Habitat Skateboards, Nocturnal Skateshop, and MOB Griptape.

Getz owns a skateboard shop in Philadelphia called Nocturnal Skateshop.

=== Contest history ===
Getz medaled in the 2000 and 2001 X Games and received a gold medal in the first street skateboarding X-Games event. Getz also placed 1st in the Tampa Pro 2000 and the VANs Triple Crown Finals.

== Filmography ==
=== Videos ===
- 411VM: Issue 27
- 411VM: Brazilian Vacation
- 411VM: Around The World
- Bootleg: Side B Re-Mix
- DVS: Skate More
- Habitat: Mosaic
- Habitat: Inhabitants
- Alien Workshop: Photosynthesis
- Toy Machine: Jump off a Building
- Tum Yeto: CKY
- Minghags: The Movie (cameo as guest at Sorority party)

=== Films ===
- Jump Off a Building (1998)
- CKY video series: CKY, CKY2K, CKY3, CKY4 (1999–2002)
- Extremedays (2001)
- Bam Margera Presents: Where the #$%& Is Santa? (2008)
- The Hexylvania Picture Show (2009)
- Minghags (2009)
- Jackass 3D (2010)
- Jackass 3.5 (2011)
- The Brandon Novak Story (TBA) (documentary)

=== Television ===
- Gigantic Skate Park Tour: Summer 2002 (2002)
- Viva La Bam (2 episodes, 2004–2005)
- CKY: The Greatest Hits (2014)
