= Ricky Oyola =

American skateboarder

Ricky Oyola is a regular-footed professional skateboarder from Philadelphia, PA.

== Early life ==
Oyola was born in Pemberton, NJ. and grew up in Medford, NJ. He received his first skateboard in 1985 as a birthday gift, a Town & Country Zoner. Before he moved to Philadelphia, Oyola would drive into West Philadelphia, park at Roger Browne's house and spend the days skating with him.

== Skateboarding ==
Oyola is credited with popularizing the skate scene in Philadelphia, Pennsylvania, alongside Browne, Matt Reason, and Sergei Trudnowski. Oyola is recognized for his distinctive east-coast street skate style. He was known in his early days to sport an afro and other hairstyles involving long hair. His part in Dan Wolfe's 1996 skate video Eastern Exposure 3, showcased Oyola's creativity, versatility, and speed, exposing his skating to a larger audience.

=== Skate video parts ===
Skate Videos	Year
Devastation – Z Products	1991
Spitfire	1993
Real Life – Sub Zero	1994
#10 – 411VM	1995
Eastern Exposure #3	1996
7 Year Glitch – New Deal	2002
Static II	2004
Via – Traffic Skateboards	2006
Black and Blue – Vox Footwear	2007
Tokyo Transfer – Traffic Skateboards	2009

=== Sponsors ===
Oyola's first official sponsor was Z-Products who noticed Oyola's skating while he was on a two month trip to California. Oyola has held numerous sponsors over his career including companies he founded or helped influence (Illuminati and Silverstar) and long-established companies: Kastel, Zoo York, New Deal, Nicotine, Spitfire, Airwalk, Duffs, Memphis, Vox, Krux trucks, Division Wheel Company, as well as; Vision Street Wear and Converse.

==== Traffic Skateboards ====
After leaving New Deal skateboards in 2003, Oyola founded his own company Traffic Skateboards. Staying true to its name, the initial Traffic team was composed of East Coast street skaters including Shaun Williams, Rich Adler, Jack Sabback, Bobby Puleo, and others. Oyola currently skates for Traffic skateboards and Autobahn Wheels. He has a pro model shoe on Vox footwear named after him, however since he left the team the shoe has been renamed the Vox Philly.
