= Chris Senn =

American skateboarder (born 1972)

Chris Senn (born December 11, 1972, in Costa Mesa, California, grew up in Grass Valley, California) is an American professional skateboarder, known for his aggressive and spontaneous style. Current and past sponsors include Powell Skateboards Channel one Adrenalin Skateboards Blood Wizard Emerica, Ace, Type-S, Paradox, Kamanu Charters and Toy Machine Skateboards. Notable accomplishments include three X-Games gold medals being ranked 2nd in the World in 2002 behind Rodil de Araujo, Jr, being voted Thrasher Skateboard Magazine Skater Of the Year in 1995 and being a two-time world champion.

Senn currently resides in Kona on the Big Island of Hawaii and enjoys skating on his private miniramp featured in an Element video: Elementality Volume 1.

Senn is also a painter, drawing artist and tattoo artist. His sons, Anakin and Julian carry on the Senn name and all three ride for Blood Wizard Skateboards out of San Francisco.
