= Mike Metzger =

American motorcycle racer

Personal information
- Full name: Michael Metzger
- Nickname: The Godfather
- Nationality: American
- Born: November 19, 1975 (age 50) Huntington Beach, California, U.S.
- Height: 5 ft 10 in (178 cm)
- Weight: 160 lb (73 kg)
- Spouse: Mandi Metzger
- Children: 2

Sport
- Sport: Freestyle motocross (FMX), Freeride Mountain biking
- Events: X Games, Gravity Games, Red Bull X-Fighters, Dew Tour
Medal record
Summer X Games
Representing United States
Gold medal – first place	2002 Philadelphia	Moto X Freestyle
Gold medal – first place	2002 Philadelphia	Moto X Big Air
Silver medal – second place	2002 Philadelphia	Moto X Step Up
Winter X Games
Gold medal – first place	2003 Aspen	Moto X Big Air
Silver medal – second place	2004 Aspen	Moto X Best Trick
Gravity Games
Silver medal – second place	2000 Providence	Moto X Freestyle
Silver medal – second place	2002 Cleveland	Moto X Freestyle

Michael Metzger (born November 19, 1975) is an American freestyle motocross rider. Metzger has been riding motorcycles for 27 years of his life, but he began his focus on Freestyle in the late 1990s.

== Early life ==
Metzger was born in Huntington Beach, California on November 19, 1975.

== Career ==
In the 2002 X Games, Metzger won the Freestyle and Big Air events and got second place in Step Up, earning him an estimated $100,000 in three days. In 2003 he also got first place in Big Air at Winter X Games. On August 7, 2003, Metzger debut the "McNasty", a "Backflip Heelclicker" at the Disney's California Adventure, unfortunately he crashed on it and has a concussion and an injured wrist, which mean he did not compete at the 2003 X Games (X Games IX). On January 21, 2005, Metzger recuperating from his terrible crash and injury in Geneva, Switzerland, nine days ago. Metzger lost one of his testicles when he failed to land a "Backflip Nac-Nac", and he spent six days in the hospital there. On May 4, 2006, at 9:26, Metzger completed "The Impossible Jump", doing a world record backflip over the fountains in front of Caesars Palace, Las Vegas, seen live on ESPN. He is the first person to complete a backflip over the fountains, and only the second person to ever successfully land that jump. The others to attempt the jump over Caesars Palace's fountains include Evel Knievel, Gary Wells, and Robbie Knievel, of which only Robbie landed successfully. He also set the record for distance, landing 125 feet from the takeoff ramp. Metzger recently has been doing freeride.

Commonly known as "The Godfather of Freestyle Motocross", Metzger was one of the first riders to begin doing basic tricks such as heel clickers and can cans. His acrobatic accomplishments include being the first person to complete back-to-back-flips (two flips on two consecutive jumps) at the X Games. As a result of his popularity, he also appeared in Freekstyle, a 2002 motocross racing game for the PlayStation 2, Game Boy Advance, and GameCube, and his image is on the cover. He invented the heel clicker (Frezno Smooth).

Metzger has appeared numerous times on the Discovery Channel's extreme sport show Stunt Junkies. In the last episode he appeared in, he was seriously injured; while attempting to execute a jump with a back-flip between two barges, he overshot the landing ramp and suffered a compression fracture of the L4 vertebra in his lower back.

Metzger invented the "McMetz", a trick in which the rider puts both feet over the handlebars in midair, then sweeps them backward towards his arms, takes his hands off the bars to allow the legs by, then remounts the bike after floating detached from it for a split second.

== Personal life ==
Metzger lives in Lake Elsinore, California.

== Events ==
- 1999 Vans Triple Crown of Freestyle Motocross: 1st
- 2002 Red Bull X-Fighters - Freestyle: 3rd (Madrid, Spain)
- 2005 Dew Tour - Freestyle: 10th

== X Games competition history ==
GOLD (3) SILVER (2) BRONZE (0)
YEAR	X GAMES	EVENTS	RANK	MEDAL
2001	Summer X Games VII	Moto X Freestyle	9th	
2001	Summer X Games VII	Moto X Big Air	13th	
2002	Summer X Games VIII	Moto X Freestyle	1st	Gold medal
2002	Summer X Games VIII	Moto X Step Up	2nd	Silver medal
2002	Summer X Games VIII	Moto X Big Air	1st	Gold medal
2003	Winter X Games VII	Moto X Big Air	1st	Gold medal
2004	Winter X Games VIII	Moto X Best Trick	2nd	Silver medal
2004	Summer X Games X	Moto X Best Trick	9th	
2004	Summer X Games X	Moto X Step Up	5th	
2004	Summer X Games X	Moto X Freestyle	7th	
2004	Summer X Games X	MTX Supermoto	8th	
2006	Winter X Games X	Moto X Best Trick	6th	
2010	Summer X Games XVI	Moto X Speed & Style	8th	

== Gravity Games ==
YEAR	GRAVITY GAMES	LOCATION	EVENTS	RANK	MEDAL
2000	Gravity Games II	Providence, RI	MTX Freestyle	2nd	Silver medal
2001	Gravity Games III	Providence, RI	MTX Freestyle	5th	
2002	Gravity Games IV	Cleveland, OH	MTX Freestyle	2nd	Silver medal
