= Freestyle motocross =

Variation on the sport of motocross

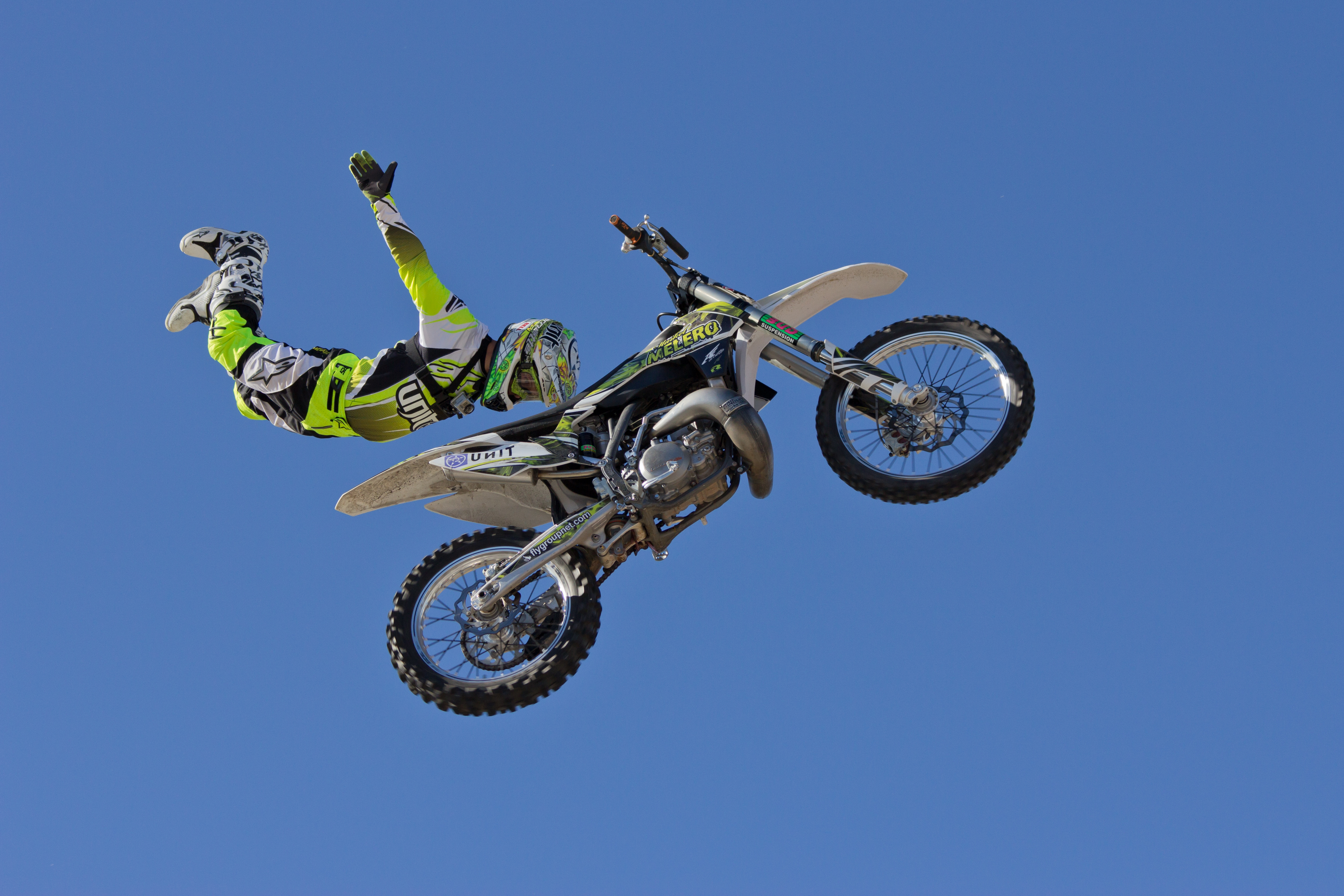
Freestyle rider at an exhibition in Spain

Freestyle motocross (also known as FMX) is a variation on the sport of motocross in which motorcycle riders attempt to impress judges with jumps and stunts.

The two main types of freestyle events are:

- Big air (also known as "best trick"), is an event in which each rider performs two jumps, usually covering more than 75 ft (22.8 m) from a dirt-covered ramp.Judges evaluates style, trick difficulty, and originality, assigning scores on a 100-point scale. The rider with the highest score wins.
- Freestyle motocross is the older of the two events. Riders perform two routines, each lasting between 90 seconds and 14 minutes, on a course with multiple jumps of varying lengths and angles that typically cover one to two acres (.4 to .8 hectares). Judges assigns scores on a100-point scale based on trick difficulty, variation, and overall performance.

Notable freestyle motocross events include Red Bull X-Fighters, NIGHT of the JUMPs, the X Games, Gravity Games, Big-X, Moto-X Freestyle National Championship, and Dew Action Sports Tour. Freeriding is the original form of freestyle motocross which started in the hills of southern California; due to professional racers such as Jeremy McGrath and Phil Lawrence "play riding" in the hills of reche canyon. It has no structure, and is traditionally done on public land. Riders form natural jumps and drop-offs to execute their tricks on. Some freeriders prefer to jump on sand dunes. In many ways, freeriding requires more skill and mental ability. Notable freeriding locations include Ocotillo Wells, Glamis Dunes and Beaumont in California, and Caineville, in Utah.

== Evolution of the backflip ==
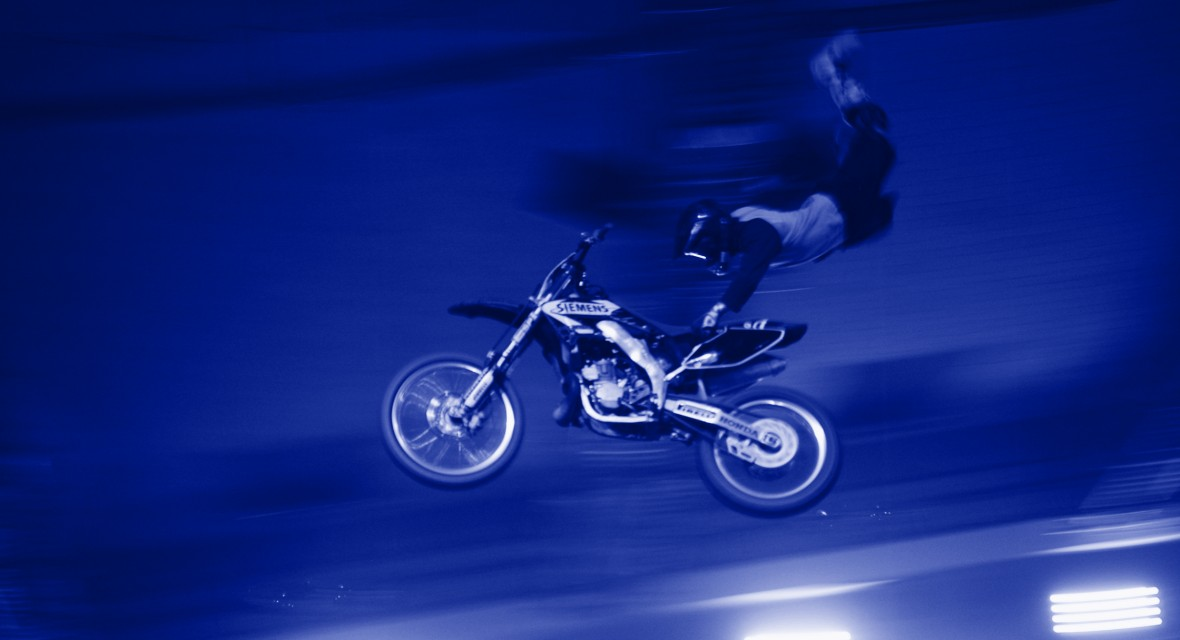
A One-Handed Hart Attack performed by Ailo Gaup

The backflip was once considered all but impossible, the "holy grail of FMX". Freestyle riders began contemplating it after the 1998 film "Children of a Metal God" showed riders attempting the trick into water. Also it had been done many times on BMX bikes, and FMX riders were using tricks from BMX riders, such as when Travis Pastrana performed an Indian Air, originally from Mat Hoffman, a BMXer.

In 1991, Jose Yanez became the first person to backflip a motocross bike. He practiced for it by flipping his motorcycle into the Salt River, just as he had done with his BMX bike. He would kill the engine on his 80cc motorcycle just before he hit the water to prevent damage to the bike. Yanez performed the world's first ramp-to-ramp motocross backflip on an 80cc motorcycle in October 1991 on an 8' tall box jump he built himself in Pagosa Springs, Colorado. Jose's next motocross backflip attempt, this time for The National Enquirer, resulted in a crash that kept Jose off motorcycles and bicycles for two years due to an injured knee.

In 1993, Bob Kohl was the second person to perform the backflip on a motocross bike. The bike was a 1993 Honda Cr80. He was a professional BMX rider who had performed the trick regularly on a bicycle. He continued to exhibit the trick until a crash in 1995 left him with serious injuries.

In 2000, Carey Hart attempted the first backflip on a full-size motocross bike off a modified dirt landing ramp at the Gravity Games 2000. The landing was less than perfect, and Hart crashed immediately after. But Freestyle Motocross was forever changed. Many people started to attempt it, such as Travis Pastrana, who attempted the backflip off a Step Up jump at Summer X Games Freestyle. He bailed off mid-flight, breaking his foot. The trick was still not attempted on a normal FMX setup, off a ramp-to-dirt setup. Hart attempted the backflip again at Summer X Games in 2001, during the Moto X Best Trick competition, but bailed off the bike 45 feet (14 m) in the air, seriously injuring himself.

In 2002, Caleb Wyatt was the first person to land a backflip on a large motorcycle, on April 25, 2002, at the Rogue Valley Motocross track (RVMX). This backflip was performed over a mulch pile of grass clippings, leaves, and bark collected during maintenance of the RVMX track. Wyatt constructed a quarter-pipe ramp with the take-off completely vertical shoved into the pile of mulch.

2002 brought the backflip to X Games glory. Travis Pastrana and Mike Metzger were both capable doing flips off ramps. Kenny Bartram was still learning flips, doing them off the backsides of dirt landings, much like Hart in the 2000 Gravity Games. The unthinkable had become reality; a backflip was now common in freestyle competition. Mike Metzger had achieved a back-to-back backflip, which won him Freestyle Gold at Summer X Games 8. When the Gravity Games came along, riders were doing variations in their backflips, wowing the crowd and the judges, who didn't know how to score the riders.

In 2003, regular tricks were being used in backflips such as 'No Footers', 'HeelClickers', and 'One Handed' Backflips.

2003–2005: These years saw the development of variations including cliffhangers, cordovas etc. As well as the disputed 360s which some consider only off-axis flips. The backflip was perfected over large distances including over 100 feet (30 m). In 2005 at the very first Dew Tour in Louisville, Kentucky, Travis Pastrana landed four backflips in a row. At the Denver Dew Tour in 2006, Kenny Bartram was the first to pull a one-handed takeoff backflip. In 2009 while filming for "Nitro Circus", Pastrana completed a 120 feet (37 m) backflip as part of a larger crossover jump, flipping over a number of riders below in the process.

2006 brought footage of Travis Pastrana completing a double backflip on an uphill/sand setup on his popular "Nitro Circus" Freestyle Motocross movies. On August 4, 2006, at X Games 12 in Los Angeles, he became the first rider to land a double backflip in competition. Having landed another trick that many had considered impossible, he vowed never to do it again.

2007 saw Scott Murray perform double backflips onto a large piece of foam placed over the end of a foam pit. Later that year, Murray attempted the double backflip at X Games but crashed upon landing. He landed the trick at a Supercross event in Italy.

At the 2008 Summer X games Jim Dechamp tried a front flip and crashed, breaking his back. Three months later during Nitro Circus season 1 on MTV, Dechamp landed the front flip during the Guinness World Record episode.

In early 2009, Metal Mulisha rider Jeremy Lusk attempted a Hart Attack Indian Air Backflip. He under-rotated, and crashed, hitting his head on the landing. On February 10, he was pronounced dead due to head and spinal cord injuries.

At X Games 17, Jackson Strong nailed the first front flip on a dirt bike during the best trick competition.

In early 2015, Nitro Circus rider Josh Sheehan landed the first triple backflip, yet another trick deemed impossible by many, on a custom ramp/dirt setup at Travis Pastrana's "Pastranaland" complex in Maryland. He had previously practiced the trick onto a large air cushion at the Maryland complex, using the same custom ramp built for the stunt.

At the Nitro World Games in 2016, Greg Duffy landed the first double front flip.

== Equipment ==
=== Rider gear ===
FMX riders typically use much of the same riding gear as MX racers. This includes a helmet, goggles, gloves, boots, jersey, neck brace, chest protector, and MX pants. They may supplement this with elbow and knee pads. Riders may also choose to wear 'body armour' to protect the chest and legs when performing the most dangerous of tricks, as did Travis Pastrana when performing his double backflips.

=== Motorcycle modifications ===
Riders use modified motocross bikes with aftermarket parts to lower weight and improve performance. Riders will often shave down the seat foam to give a wider range of motion and better grip on the seat. Steering stabilizers are also common and help keep the front tire running straight when tricks requiring the rider to let go of the handlebars are performed. Many riders will also shorten the width of the handlebars, to make it easier to put the legs on the bars, like such tricks as the 'heelclicker' or 'rodeo'. Excess cables, such as brakes and clutch cables are usually redirected away from the bars, to avoid riders getting their boots caught on the bike. The engine and mechanical details of an FMX bike are fairly stock, not needing the fine-tuning of a racing bike. Riders may also choose to have 'lever' on their handlebars to help then when performing 'Kiss Of Death Backflips.' A 'lever' is usually a metal plate or pipe coming off the handlebars, and going in front of the riders wrist or lower arm to stop the rider from rotating during the flips, but letting the bike continue to move. Bikes have aftermarket performance pipes that give more power. The bike must have very strong suspension and very high-quality tires.

=== Non-bike or rider equipment ===
- One major component of Freestyle Motocross is the foam pit. These vary in size but are usually a rectangular box filled with shredded or cubed foam. The FMX rider will jump from a ramp, practising one of the more dangerous or prototype tricks, and execute a safe landing into the safe foam regardless of the actual landing position.
- Ramps are usually made out of metal, as this keeps the 'lips' of the ramp consistent.
- The landing ramp is normally constructed from dirt. If the event has limited resources, landings ramps may be built on trucks or trailers. When freeriding, however, the rider jumps from dirt to dirt.

== Notable riders ==
- Mike Cinqmars
- Nate Adams
- Kenny Bartram
- Brian Deegan
- Caleb ‘SoBe Z’ Nicks
- Seth Enslow
- Ronnie Faisst
- Carey Hart
- Taka Higashino
- Axell Hodges
- Mike "Mad Mike" Jones
- Andreu Lacondeguy
- Kyle Loza
- Jeremy Lusk
- Robbie Maddison
- Mike Metzger
- Clinton Moore
- Thomas Pagès
- Travis Pastrana
- Colby Raha
- Mat Rebeaud
- Ethen Roberts
- Levi Sherwood
- Cam Sinclair
- Jeremy "Twitch" Stenberg
- Blake Williams
