= Gravity Games =

Multi-sport competition

The Gravity Games was a multi-sport competition originating in Providence, Rhode Island that was broken down into Winter (only held in 2000) and Summer (held from 1999 to 2006) adaptations. The competition featured a variety of extreme sports such as aggressive inline skating, skateboarding, freestyle motocross, BMX freestyle and snowboarding.

The Gravity Games were jointly owned through a strategic partnership between Primedia, Octagon and NBC Sports.

The summer Gravity Games were last held in Perth in Australia in December 2006.

Only one game based on the license, Gravity Games Bike: Street Vert Dirt was released in North America on June 28, 2002 for the PlayStation 2 and on September 4, 2002 for the Xbox and was developed and published by Midway.

== Locations ==
=== Summer ===
- 1999 – Providence, Rhode Island
- 2000 – Providence, Rhode Island
- 2001 – Providence, Rhode Island
- 2002 – Cleveland, Ohio
- 2003 – Cleveland, Ohio
- 2004 – Cleveland, Ohio
- 2005 – Woodward & Philadelphia, Pennsylvania
- 2006 – Perth, Western Australia, Australia

=== Winter ===
- 2000 – Mammoth Mountain, California

== Events ==
=== Summer ===
Skateboarding

- Vert
- Street
- Downhill

BMX

- Vert
- Street
- Dirt

Freestyle Moto-X

Street Luge

Surfing

Wakeboarding

=== Winter ===
Snowboarding

- Park
- Mountain
- Superpipe
- Big Air
- Boarder X

Snowmobile

- Racing
- Freestyle

Skiing

- Superpipe
- Park
- Skier X
- Big Air
- Mountain

== History ==
1999 Gravity Games I (Providence, Rhode Island)

- Jamie Bestwick took the gold medal in BMX Vert. In the same event, after Simon Tabron crashed during his run, he went back on his bike and landed a 900 (skateboarding).
- Biker Sherlock took the silver in Downhill Skateboarding while Lee Dansie claimed the gold.
- In Freestyle Motocross, Travis Pastrana takes home the gold. During his two runs, Pastrana landed tricks such as a Cliffhanger, a Lazy Boy and a Rodeo Air.
- Dave Mirra won the gold medal in BMX Street.

2000 Gravity Games II (Providence, Rhode Island)

- Carey Hart crashed while attempting to land the first backflip on a dirt bike but did not sustain any injuries.
- Brian Deegan won the gold medal in Freestyle Motocross.

2000 Winter Gravity Games I (Mammoth Mountain, California)

- Despite a heavy snowfall, the gold medal in Snowboarding Superpipe went to Ross Powers. Mammoth Mountain native Tommy Czeschin took the silver. In Women’s Superpipe, Shannon Dunn won the gold.
- Shaun Palmer took home the gold medal in Boarder X. Later he switched to skis and won gold in Skier X.

2001 Gravity Games III (Providence, Rhode Island)

- This was the last year of Gravity Games competition in Rhode Island.
- Travis Pastrana returns to the Gravity Games and won his third gold medal in Freestyle Motocross.

2002 Gravity Games IV (Cleveland, Ohio)

- In Freestyle Motocross, both Travis Pastrana and Mike Metzger pulled off backflips during their runs.

2003 Gravity Games V (Cleveland, Ohio)

- Nate Adams won the gold medal in freestyle motocross. In the same event, Travis Pastrana crashed while attempting to do a Seatgrab Backflip.

2004 Gravity Games VI (Cleveland, Ohio)

- The 2004 Gravity Games were broadcast on NBCSN then known as Outdoor Life Network.

2005 Gravity Games VII (Woodward & Philadelphia, Pennsylvania)

- Ryan Guettler won BMX Dirt with one of the highest scores ever in dirt, a 97.00. Luke Parslow came in second, and Joey Marks came in third.
- In BMX Vert, Kevin Robinson (BMX rider) tried to land a double flair but bailed upon landing. He would successfully land the trick one year later at X Games XII in Los Angeles.

== See also ==
- Dew Tour
- X Games
