= X Games =

Extreme sports tournament

- Sport: Action sports
- Founded: April 12, 1994; 32 years ago
- First season: 1995
- Owners: 1995–2022: ESPN; 2022–present: MSP Sports Capital
- Broadcasters: ESPN; ESPN2; ABC
- Website: XGames.com

Notes
- Major events (2024); X Games Aspen; X Games Ventura; X Games Japan

The X Games are a series of action sports events founded by ESPN Inc. and aired on ESPN networks and ABC. In late 2022, ESPN sold the long-running property to MSP Sports Capital, a private equity firm co-founded by Jahm Najafi and Jeff Moorad, though the event is still aired on ESPN and ABC despite the ownership change with additional coverage being aired on the Roku Channel.

The X Games have been held all over the world and typically include sports such as skateboarding, BMX, freestyle motocross, skiing and snowboarding. Participants compete to win bronze, silver, and gold medals, in addition to prize money. X Games events also feature music and culture elements like live music performances, athlete autograph sessions, and interactive, family-friendly exhibitions.

The inaugural X Games were held during the summer of 1995 in Providence and Newport in Rhode Island. The competition often features new tricks such as Tony Hawk's 900 in skateboarding, Shaun White's Double McTwist 1260 in snowboard, Dave Mirra's double backflip in BMX, Travis Pastrana's double backflip in freestyle motocross, Heath Frisby's first snowmobile frontflip, Chuck Carothers's first body varial in freestyle motocross, Henrik Harlaut's first nose-butter triple cork in Ski Big Air, Gus Kenworthy's first switch triple rodeo in a ski slopestyle competition and Torstein Horgmo's first landed triple cork in a snowboard competition.

The X Games gained media exposure due to their big name sponsors, top-tier athletes, and consistent fan attendance. As the Journal of Sport Management (2006) explains, Generation X and Millennials are the two demographics most highly valued by marketers. This creates a broad approach on marketing towards that certain demographic, which is why the X Games marketing and economic outlook is so "out of the box". According to a 2008 report by ESPN, in 1997, the Winter X Games inaugural year, 38,000 spectators attended the four-day event. In 1998, the attendance dropped to 25,000 spectators. But just two years later, a record attendance of 83,500 people attended the Winter X Games East Coast debut.

As part of the X Games, there have been performances by various rock bands over the years, as well as a DJ being on-site at all events. The X Games have made it a point since its founding to stage an eco-friendly event. Such measures include using biodiesel fuel in their vehicles and organizing recycling campaigns.

== Winter X Games ==
Variation of X Games logo, used for Winter X Games

The first Winter X Games took place at Snow Summit ski resort in Big Bear Lake, California, in 1997. Overseeing The Sports Network's coverage of the inaugural 1997 Winter X Games, producer Paul Graham felt that despite low ratings at the time, "extreme sport is a statement", that it "[rebelled] against the sporting status quo", and "it's new and fresh and young".

The following two years, X Games was held at Crested Butte Mountain Resort in Colorado. The two years following that, Mount Snow, Vermont, hosted X Games. The X Games Aspen 2002 was the first time an X Games event was televised live and also had coverage by ESPN's flagship news program, SportsCenter. Viewership across the three networks that carried coverage of the event – ABC Sports, ESPN, and ESPN2 – exceeded 2001's household average by 30% according to Nielsen Media Research. The event also reached record highs in several demographic categories. To accommodate the first-time live coverage, nighttime competitions were added, resulting in record attendance for the Aspen/Snowmass venue in Colorado.

2002 was the first time X Games was held in Aspen at Buttermilk Mountain. X Games has been held in Aspen every winter since 2002. Also in 2002, ESPN announced the establishment of the X Games Global Championship. The Global Championship featured two distinct venues hosting competitions in summer and winter action sports simultaneously. It consisted of six teams of the world's top athletes, grouped together by their region of origin, to compete in the four-day event. The winter sports were held in Whistler Blackcomb Resort in British Columbia, and the events included snowboarding and skiing.

During X Games Aspen 2015, ESPN used camera drones to capture aerial views of the athlete's runs. This was a first for ESPN.

== Global expansion ==
X Games Asia have been held annually since 1998.

In May 2003, the X Games held the Global Championships, a special event where athletes from five continents competed across 11 disciplines. The event was held in two locations: the Alamodome in San Antonio, Texas, and Whistler, British Columbia. The final team results, in order, were the United States, Europe, Australia, Asia, and South America.

In May 2011, ESPN held a bid to select three host cities in addition to Los Angeles, Aspen, and Tignes, France, to form a six-event calendar for the next three years beginning in 2013. In May 2012, the selected cities were announced: Barcelona, Spain; Munich, Germany; and Foz do Iguaçu, Brazil. The two European cities have hosted the Summer Olympic Games in the past, whereas Brazil has provided several X Games competitors. Since 2010, Winter X Games Europe has been held in Tignes and also began holding events in Norway in 2016. An event in Sydney, Australia was held in 2018 and winter and summer events were also planned for 2019 and 2020 in China and a return trip to Norway in 2020.

X Games Chiba, the first edition to take place in Japan, was introduced in 2022.

== X Games League ==
In 2026, the X Games League (XGL) was launched to transform X Games into a year-round global league and introduced city-based teams. The inaugural X Games clubs represented Los Angeles, New York City, São Paulo and Tokyo. The innagural XGL draft was held in March 2026. Each X Games Club featured 10 athletes, five men and five women, selected through the draft to compete together during season. Forty athletes were selected from a pool of more than 180 who opted into the draft. The team with the highest cumulative score across the season will be crowned the X Games League champion. This event made its debut in June 2026 at the X Games in Sacramento, California. XC New York won the inaugural summer XGL championship with 2,640 points, while Mizuho Hasegawa finished the season with 680 points and was named MVP.

== Events ==
=== Current Summer ===
BMX Freestyle

- BMX Park
- BMX Park Best Trick
- BMX Street
- BMX Dirt
- BMX Dirt Best Trick

Esports

- MLG Call of Duty
- RLCS Rocket League
- MLG Counter Strike: Global Offensive

Moto X

- Moto X Best Whip
- Moto X Best Trick

Real Video Series

- Real Street
- Real BMX
- Real Moto
- Real MTB
- Real Women

Skateboarding

- Skateboard Vert
- Skateboard Vert Best Trick
- Skateboard Park
- Skateboard Park Best Trick
- Skateboard Street
- Skateboard Street Best Trick

=== Current Winter ===
==== Skiing ====
- Ski Big Air
- Men's Ski Slopestyle
- Women's Ski Slopestyle
- Men's Ski Superpipe
- Women's Ski Superpipe
- Knuckle Huck

==== Snowboarding ====
- Snowboard Big Air
- Women's Snowboard Slopestyle
- Men's Snowboard Slopestyle
- Men's Snowboard Superpipe
- Women's Snowboard Superpipe
- Knuckle Huck

==== Snowmobiling ====
- Freestyle Snowmobiling
- Speed and Style Snowmobiling

==== Real Video Series ====
- Real Snow
- Real Snow Backcountry
- Real Ski Backcountry

=== Past Summer ===
Aggressive inline skating

- Vert Skating
- Vert Skating Triples
- Vert Skating Best Trick
- Street Skating
- Park Skating

BMX

- BMX Big Air
- BMX Flatland
- BMX Downhill
- BMX Vert
- BMX Vert Doubles
- BMX Vert Best Trick

Mountain Bike

- Mountain Bike Slopestyle
- Mountain Bike Trials
- Mountain Bike Slalom
- Mountain Bike Giant Slalom
- Red Bull Phenom MTB

Pumptrack

- BMX
- Mountain Bike

Moto X

- Moto X Step Up
- Men's Moto X Racing
- Women's Moto X Racing
- Moto X Speed and Style
- Moto X Adaptive Racing
- Men's Moto X Endurocross
- Women's Moto X Endurocross
- Moto X SuperMoto
- Moto X Flat Track
- Moto X Hooligan Flat Track
- Moto X Doubles (Note: intended to be a medal event at X Games Sydney 2018 but was replaced by a demo due to thunderstorms))
- Moto X Freestyle
- Moto X 110
- Moto X Quarterpipe

Rally & Off-Road Truck

- Rallycross Lites Racing
- Rallycross SuperCar Racing
- Rally Super Special
- Gymkhana Grid
- Stadium Super Trucks

Skateboarding

- Skateboard Big Air
- Skateboard Big Air Rail Jam
- Downhill Skateboarding
- Skateboard Vert Doubles
- Women's Skateboard Vert
- Skateboard Game of SK8
- SLS Select Series
- Street League Skateboarding
- Skatercross

Red Bull Phenom

- Skateboard Street
- BMX Street

Surfing

- Surf
- SRF The Game (East vs West)
- Real Surf
- Big Wave

Other

- Climbing
- Street luge
- X-venture race
- Windsurfing
- Wakeboarding
- Skysurfing
- Bungee jumping
- Barefoot Waterski Jumping

=== Past Winter ===
- Super Modified Snow Shovel Racing
- Snow Mountain Bike Racing
- Skiboarding
- Skicross
- Ice climbing
- Ultracross
- Snowskating
- Hillcross
- Snowmobile Best Trick
- Men's Skier X
- Women's Skier X
- Mono Skier X
- Men's Snowboard X
- Women's Snowboard X
- Snocross
- Snocross Adaptive
- Snow BikeCross
- Snow Bike Best Trick

== Editions ==
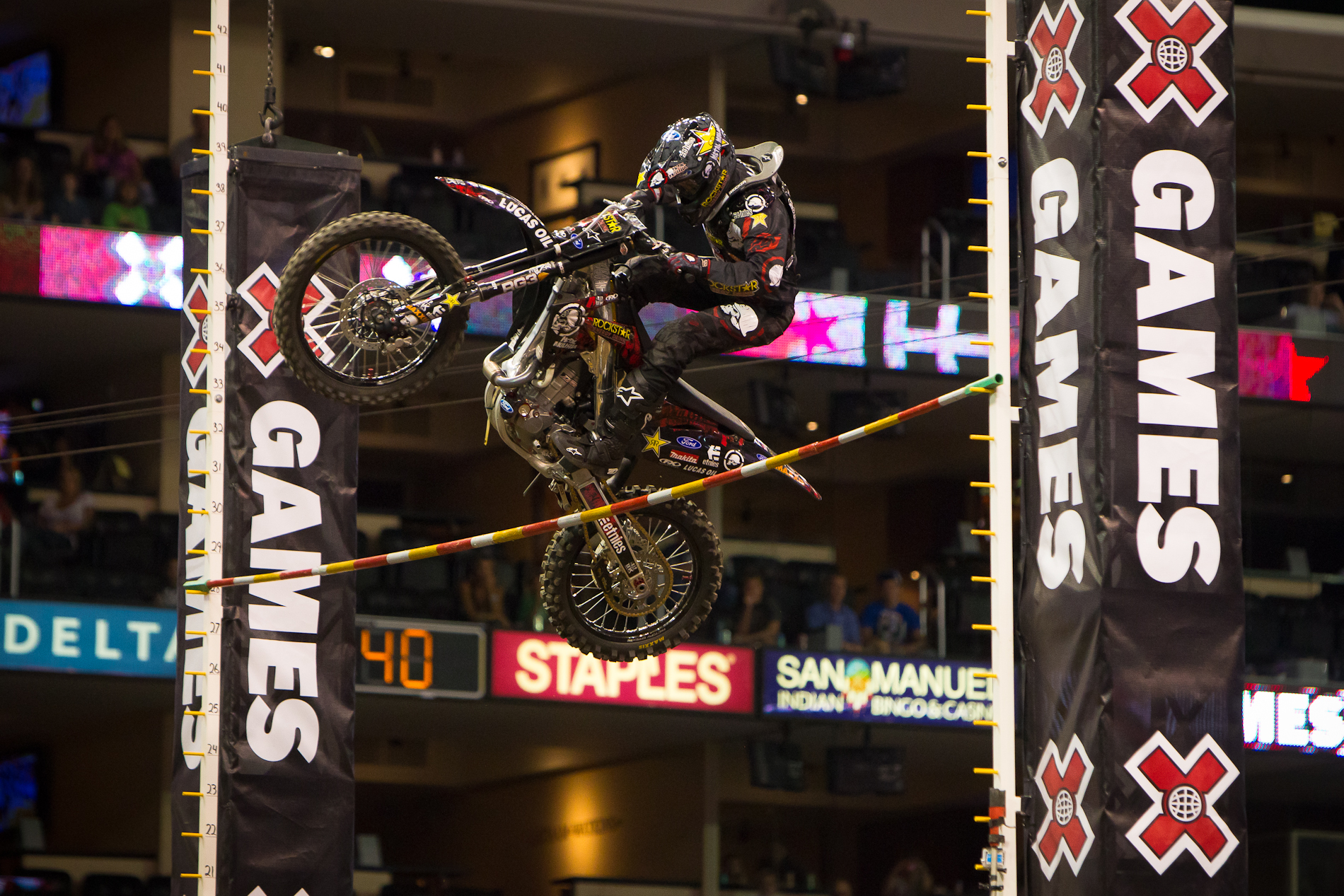
Brian Deegan at X Games 17 in Los Angeles competing in the Moto X Step Up event.

Summarized from ESPN.com

=== Summer X Games ===
- 1995: Extreme Games – Newport, Rhode Island & Providence, Rhode Island (June 24-July 1, 1995)
  - Chris Senn wins the gold medal in Skateboard Street beating Tony Hawk who took the silver and Willy Santos who won Bronze.
  - Justin Seers wins the gold medal in Barefoot Water Ski Jumping.
  - After injuring his right leg during qualifying, Bob Pereyra wins the gold in Street Luge.
  - Jay Miron takes the gold in BMX Dirt.
  - Tony Hawk takes the gold in Skateboard Vert after Neal Hendrix bails on his final run.
  - Mat Hoffman takes his first gold medal in BMX Vert.
  - Robert "Fig" Naughton wins gold in Dual Downhill Mountain bike.
  - Cheri Elliott wins gold in Dual Downhill Mountain bike.
- 1996: X Games II – Providence & Newport (June 24-30, 1996)
  - Dave Mirra wins his first gold medal in BMX Street.
  - Rodil de Araujo Jr. takes the gold in Skateboard Street.
  - Joey Garcia takes the gold medal in BMX Dirt.
  - Mat Hoffman takes his second gold medal in BMX Vert.
- 1997: X Games III – Mission Beach, San Diego, California (June 20–28, 1997)
  - T.J. Lavin takes the gold medal in BMX Dirt, edging out Brian Foster and Ryan Nyquist.
  - Dave Mirra takes his second gold medal in BMX Street.
  - In the debut of Skateboard Vert Doubles, Tony Hawk and Andy Macdonald teamed up and took home the gold.
  - Snowboarding Big-Air makes its debut at the Summer X Games with Peter Line taking the gold for the men and Tina Dixon taking the gold for the women.
  - In Skateboard Vert, Tony Hawk took home the gold with the first of his many history-making moments at the X Games: the "Perfect Run". His score was a 97.50.
  - Chris Senn takes home his second gold medal in Skateboard Street.
  - Trevor Meyer takes the gold in the debut of Flatland BMX.
- 1998: X Games IV – San Diego (June 1998)
  - The team of Dennis McCoy and Dave Mirra take the gold in BMX Vert Doubles.
  - Brian Foster edges out Ryan Nyquist and Joey Garcia to take gold in BMX Dirt.
  - Dave Mirra takes his third gold medal in BMX Street.
  - Trevor Meyer claims his second gold medal in Flatland BMX.
  - Tony Hawk and Andy MacDonald take home their second gold medal in Skateboard Vert Doubles.
  - Rodil de Araujo Jr. takes his second gold medal in Skateboard Street after missing the '97 games with an injury.
- 1999: X Games V – Pier 30 & 32, San Francisco (June 25 – July 3, 1999)
  - Dennis Derammelaere takes the gold in Dual Street Luge.
  - Dave Mirra wins his fourth gold medal in BMX Street.
  - Andy MacDonald and Tony Hawk claim their third gold medal in Skateboard Vert Doubles.
  - First professional sporting event (full event) broadcast live on the Internet.
  - After eleven failed attempts, skateboarder Tony Hawk finally landed a 900-degree spin (the 900).
  - Travis Pastrana won the first-ever Moto X Freestyle event at the X Games, after dislocating his spine the previous spring. He also scored the highest run ever (99.00 points).
- 2000: X Games VI – Pier 30 & 32, San Francisco, California (August 17–22, 2000)
  - Dave Mirra won BMX Park, landing the first-ever double backflip in competition.
  - Jamie Bestwick won the gold medal in BMX Vert, ending Dave Mirra's BMX Vert winning streak, Mirra takes the silver medal, and Mat Hoffman with the bronze medal.
  - Dennis Derammelaere wins gold in the inaugural 'King of the Hill' Street Luge event.
  - The name of the street event for BMX and Skateboarding is changed to Skateboard Park and Bike Stunt Park.
  - Eric Koston wins his first-ever X Games gold medal in Skateboard Park.
  - Bob Burnquist wins the gold medal in Skateboard Vert Best Trick with a Fakie 5–0 Kickflip out on the grind bar.
  - Travis Pastrana wins his second gold medal in Moto X Freestyle. He also attempted to pull off a backflip but bailed out and broke his foot upon landing.
  - Tommy Clowers won the gold medal in the first-ever Moto X Step Up event at a record-breaking height of 35 feet, Kris Rourke takes home the silver medal and Brian Deegan gets the bronze medal, after that Tommy Clowers wins the silver medal in Moto X Freestyle.
  - Bucky Lasek scored a 98.50 in Skateboard Vert, the highest in X Games history.
- 2001: X Games VII – South Philadelphia Sports Complex, Philadelphia (August 17–22, 2001)
  - Bob Burnquist managed an almost perfect Skateboard Vert run with a score of 98.00. This run is considered by many to be the best run ever in the history of skateboard vert, as Burnquist landed several tricks that had never been done before. Tony Hawk, who was commentating, nearly lost his voice while screaming in disbelief. Bucky Lasek, who dropped to 2nd place following Bob's run, celebrated with Bob on the bottom of the vert ramp.
  - Taïg Khris won the In-line Vert event, with the first double backflip in Inline skating history.
  - Stephen Murray lands the first double backflip in Bike Stunt Dirt and wins the gold medal with Ryan Nyquist taking the Silver and T.J. Lavin with the Bronze.
  - X Games VII filmed for ESPN's Ultimate X: The Movie.
  - Travis Pastrana wins his third gold medal in Moto X Freestyle.
  - Dennis Derammelaere wins his third gold medal and defends his Street Luge 'King of the Hill' status.
  - Tommy Clowers wins his second gold in Moto X Step Up, while Travis Pastrana takes the silver.
  - Kenny Bartram took gold in the first-ever Moto X Big Air/Best Trick.
  - Carey Hart is hospitalized after falling off his bike mid-air attempting a backflip.
  - Danny Harf landed a 900-degree spin in wakeboarding.
  - Bruce Crisman beats Dave Mirra in BMX Park.
- 2002: X Games VIII – First Union Center, Philadelphia, Pennsylvania (August 15–19, 2002)
  - Mat Hoffman landed the first no handed 900-degree spin on a BMX.
  - Mike Metzger landed the first backflip in X Games history. He also pulled off two consecutive flips; one of them over an 80-foot gap, in a competition run for the victory. He became the first person to win the event other than Travis Pastrana.
  - Mike Metzger wins his first gold of the competition in the Moto X Big Air/Best Trick with a Backflip No Footed.
  - Carey Hart takes home the silver, finally landing a backflip.
  - A three-peat of gold and silver medals occurred in the skateboard events with Rodil de Araujo Jr. and his fellow Brazilian street skater Wagner Ramos took 1st and 2nd in Skateboard Street, Street Best Trick and Skateboard Park.
  - Pierre-Luc Gagnon won gold in Skateboard Vert Best Trick by landing a Heelflip McTwist.
  - Tommy Clowers wins his third gold in Moto X Step Up, while Mike Metzger takes the silver and Brian Deegan takes the bronze.
- 2003: X Games IX – Staples Center & LA Coliseum, Los Angeles (August 14–17, 2003)
  - Matt Buyten wins gold in Moto X Step Up, ending Tommy Clowers' winning streak in Step Up, but Tommy Clowers takes the silver and Ronnie Renner takes the bronze.
  - Travis Pastrana returns to reclaim his fourth gold medal in Moto X Freestyle.
  - Brian Deegan landed the first-ever 360 in Moto X Freestyle, earning him the bronze in Freestyle and gold in Best Trick.
  - Danny Harf wins the gold medal in Wakeboarding.
  - Jamie Bestwick takes the gold in BMX Vert, his first since 2000.
  - Ryan Sheckler became the youngest X Games gold medalist ever at the age of 13 in Skateboard Park.
  - Bob Burnquist and Bucky Lasek take the gold medal in Skateboard Vert Doubles.
  - Tony Hawk wins gold in Skateboard Vert Best Trick by landing the 900 (skateboarding)
  - In Skateboard Street, Chad Muska wins the gold medal.
- 2004: X Games X – Staples Center, Home Depot Center, Long Beach Marine Stadium, Los Angeles (August 5–8, 2004)
  - Nate Adams won and became the first person to defeat Travis Pastrana in the Moto X Freestyle event at the X Games.
  - Danny Way wins the inaugural Skateboard Big Air.
  - Jeremy McGrath made his first appearance at the X Games, winning gold in Moto X Step Up and bronze in Supermoto.
  - Chuck Carothers wins Moto X Best Trick with the first body varial done at X Games.
- 2005: X Games XI – Staples Center, Los Angeles (August 4–7, 2005)
  - Removal of inline skating from competition following pressure from the skateboarding industry.
  - Shaun White failed to land the 1080 in Skate Best Trick after 29 attempts.
  - Jamie Bestwick landed the first-ever double tailwhip flair in the BMX Vert Best Trick event.
  - Tommy Clowers won his fourth gold medal in Moto X Step Up, after beating his rival Matt Buyten.
  - Travis Pastrana won his fifth medal in Moto X Freestyle and became the most decorated athlete in motocross.
  - ESPN signed a contract to keep the X Games in Los Angeles through 2009.
- 2006: X Games 12 – Staples Center, Home Depot Center & Long Beach Marine Stadium, Los Angeles (August 3–6, 2006)
  - Travis Pastrana landed the world's first double backflip on a dirt bike, and won Moto X Best Trick with a score of 98.60, the highest current score in best trick. He also claims gold in the Moto X Freestyle event.
  - Kevin Robinson landed the double flair for the first time.
  - Travis Pastrana won the inaugural X Games Rally, beating the former World Rally Champion, Colin McRae by .52 seconds after the latter rolled his car with two corners to go at the Home Depot Center. It is his third gold of the event.
  - Chad Kagy landed the first flatwhip double tailwhip 540.
  - Skateboarder Nyjah Huston became the youngest athlete to compete in X Games at 11 years old.
- 2007: X Games 13 – Staples Center, Home Depot Center & Long Beach Marine Stadium, Los Angeles (August 2–5, 2007)
  - Adam Jones became the fourth person to win the Moto X Freestyle event at the X Games.
  - Kyle Loza won on his first gold medal in the Moto X Best Trick competition in his first appearance by performing the "Volt".
  - Shaun White won the gold medal in skateboard vert beating Pierre Luc-Gagnon (aka PLG) and Bucky Lasek.
  - Jake Brown was hurt after landing the first 720 in Big Air competition. He fell from 40'+ and landed on his backside and back on the flat. The force of the fall knocked his shoes off. After 8 minutes laying motionless, he walked away with help. He suffered a fractured wrist, bruised lung and liver, whiplash, ruptured spleen and a concussion.
  - Ricky Carmichael won the first-ever motocross racing circuit.
  - Mat Hoffman returned to competition in BMX Big Air.
  - Simon Tabron made an X Games first, doing back-to-back 900s in BMX Vert.
- 2008: X Games XIV – Los Angeles (July 31 – August 3, 2008)
  - Danny Way clipped his shins on the lip of the quarterpipe after a 20+ foot freefall during the Big Air competition, which the commentators refer to as the "second worst fall ever at the X Games" (the first being Jake Brown's the year before). After spending a few minutes with paramedics, Way limped back to the ramp and went on to nail the trick he had fallen on, coming in second place, behind Bob Burnquist who scored a 96.00.
  - Ryan Sheckler won gold in Skateboard Street, his second gold medal at the X Games.
  - Jeremy Lusk won a gold medal in the Moto X Freestyle event.
  - Kyle Loza won his second gold medal in the Moto X Best Trick competition in two appearances by performing a never-before-seen move named the "Electric Doom".
  - The Games were filmed for X Games 3D: The Movie.
  - Skateboarder Andy Macdonald won his 15th X Games medal, surpassing Tony Hawk as the all-time leader in skateboarding medals.
  - Rally racer Travis Pastrana reclaimed the gold medal by defeating Tanner Foust in the Rally X final.
  - Jim DeChamp fell while attempting the first-ever frontflip on a motocross bike.
  - Tarah Gieger of Puerto Rico won the gold medal in the first-ever women's supercross race.
- 2009: X Games 15 – Los Angeles (July 30 – August 2, 2009)
  - Skateboarder Jake Brown won his first gold medal in the Big Air competition.
  - Danny Way won the inaugural Big Air Rail Jam, a contest which he created.
  - Paul Rodriguez won Skateboard Street.
  - Ohio's Anthony Napolitan landed the first-ever double front flip on a bicycle.
  - Blake Williams became the first non-American rider to win FMX gold.
  - Kyle Loza became the first person to three-peat gold Moto X Best Trick in controversial fashion by using the same trick he used to win in 2008, the "Electric Doom", especially after the judges had said that "innovation" would win the gold that year.
  - Ricky Carmichael fell and hurt himself on Moto X Step Up. Due to the circumstances, dual gold medals were awarded to Carmichael and to Ronnie Renner.
  - Jamie Bestwick wins BMX Vert for the third time.
  - Pierre-Luc Gagnon won gold in Skateboard Vert for the second consecutive year.
  - In his first X Games appearance, the retired IndyCar champion Kenny Brack won Rally X gold over the defending gold medalist Travis Pastrana. In a TV first, co-drivers Jen Horsey and Chrissie Beavis commentate live inside the racecars.
  - Ashley Fiolek, 18, won the Women's Motocross Super X, becoming the Games' first deaf medalist.
- 2010: X Games 16 – Staples Center, Los Angeles Memorial Coliseum & L.A. Live, Los Angeles (July 29 – August 1, 2010)
  - Travis Pastrana competed in four events after pulling out of Best Trick at the last minute. He came back to freestyle after a 3-year break and took gold, pulling yet another double backflip, the first in Moto X freestyle competition. He had troubles in Rally, costing him gold in Rally Racing and the chance to compete in Super Rally, but came back on the bike and won his first gold in Moto X Speed & Style, beating Nate Adams
  - Ashley Fiolek won the Women's Motocross Super X for the second year running, becoming the only rider to do so.
  - Matt Buyten won gold in Moto X Step Up, beating the former champion, Ronnie Renner.
  - Jamie Bestwick became the first person to 4-peat with a win in BMX Vert.
  - Pierre-Luc Gagnon became the first athlete to win in Skateboard Vert three times, beating the silver medalist, Shaun White.
  - Garrett Reynolds (BMX rider) became the first athlete to win BMX Street three times.
  - Cam Sinclair made what some call the greatest comeback in action sports history, winning his first X Games gold medal in Best Trick by pulling a double backflip, the trick that bit him hard in Red Bull X-Fighters only 8 months before, leaving him in a coma for seven days, and having him retrain his body, learning how to walk and, eventually, to ride again.
  - Ryan Sheckler won the X Games gold medal in Skateboard Street seeking redemption after his X Games XV mishap.
- 2011: X Games 17 – Los Angeles (July 28–31, 2011)
  - Nate Adams wins his second gold medal in Moto X Freestyle.
  - Shaun White earned his second gold medal in Skateboard Vert, breaking Pierre Luc Gagnon's 3-year winning streak.
  - Liam Doran took gold on his debut in the Rally Car Racing event after beating Marcus Grönholm in the final.
  - Nyjah Huston came first in the Men's Skateboard Street, his first X Games gold medal since his participation in the event at the X Games XIV.
  - Travis Pastrana fell while attempting a rodeo 720, or as he called it "The Toilet Paper Roll", in Moto X Best Trick, breaking bones in his foot and ankle. Despite the injury, he competed in RallyCross three days later using hand controls mounted to the steering wheel.
  - Jackson Strong landed the first frontflip on a dirt bike during Moto X Best Trick, claiming the gold.
- 2012: X Games 18 – Los Angeles (June 28 – July 1, 2012)
  - Bob Burnquist won his fourth Big Air gold medal, and his ninth total gold medals.
  - Ronnie Renner won the gold medal in Moto X Step Up, breaking the previous record height of 37' by 10' making it the highest ever at the X Games with 47'.
  - Jamie Bestwick 6-peats with a win in BMX Vert.
  - Garrett Reynolds (BMX rider) 5-peats in BMX Street, the only competitor to win BMX Street in its 5-year history at X Games.
  - Sébastien Loeb (Citroën DS3), by then eight consecutive times World Rally Championship winner since 2004, claimed gold on his debut in the X Games' RallyCross event. He dominated silver medalist and WRC rival Ken Block by about 10 seconds after Block's Ford Fiesta was hampered by a tire puncture during the second half of the main final.
  - Jagger Eaton becomes the youngest person to compete in the X Games.
- 2013: X Games Foz do Iguaçu, Brazil
  - Jake Brown lands the first ollie 720 in Skateboard Big Air, earning the bronze.
  - Mitchie Brusco lands the first body varial 900 in Skateboard Big Air.
  - Bob Burnquist wins his 3rd consecutive gold medal in Skateboard Big Air earning his 23rd X Games medal, and landing the 1st "Lien Air Rodeo Flip 720".
  - Jamie Bestwick wins his 7th consecutive gold medal in BMX Vert.
  - Bryce Hudson wins Moto X Step Up as an X Games rookie.
  - Laia Sanz wins Women's Moto X Enduro X as a rookie, defeating 2-time defending gold medalist Maria Forsberg.
- 2013: X Games Barcelona
  - Mitchie Brusco landed the first 1080 in Skateboard Big Air, earning the silver. He also became the youngest Skateboard Vert medalist (16), earning the bronze.
  - Bob Burnquist won his 4th consecutive gold medal in Skateboard Big Air, earning his 24th X Games medal.
  - Alana Smith won silver in Women's Skateboard Park, becoming the youngest X Games medalist (12).
  - Jamie Bestwick won his 8th consecutive gold medal in BMX Vert.
  - Chad Kagy lands the first frontflip flair in competition during BMX Vert.
  - Zack Warden landed a bike-flip backflip to late tailwhip during BMX Big Air, and took his second straight gold.
- 2013: X Games Munich
  - Bob Burnquist won his 5th consecutive gold medal in Skateboard Big Air, earning a record 25th medal, landing the 1st switch ollie 540.
  - Brett Rheeder, won the first gold medal in the inaugural Slopestyle-freeride Mountain bike event.
  - Chris Cole won his first Street League contest, en route to winning his third X Games gold medal.
- 2013: X Games Los Angeles 2013
  - Elliot Sloan won his first gold medal in Skateboard Big Air, defeating Bob Burnquist, who earned his 26th X Games medal (bronze). Tom Schaar took the silver.
  - Vicki Golden won her third consecutive gold medal in Women's Moto X Racing, defeating Meghan Rutledge, after Rutledge crashed across the gap. She also became the 1st woman to compete in a freestyle moto X competition, earning bronze in Best Whip.
  - Vince Byron landed the first 540 double tail whip in BMX Big Air, earning the silver. Morgan Wade took the gold.
- 2014: X Games Austin 2014
  - Former Formula One and NASCAR driver Scott Speed wins the Gold in RallyCross Supercars and Mitchell DeJong took it in RallyCross Lites.
  - Jamie Bestwick won his ninth straight gold medal in BMX Vert. One of the tricks Bestwick pulled was a front flip flair (front flip with a 180 degree rotation).
  - Newcomer Jimmy Wilkins won the gold medal in Skateboard Vert. This was Wilkins first pro competition.
- 2015: X Games Austin 2015
  - Colton Satterfield becomes the second person to land a double flair in competition and the first to land it on the Big Air ramp. With this, he took his second straight gold in BMX Big Air.
  - Thomas Pages won the first-ever Moto X Quarterpipe competition, landing a bike-flip and scoring a 95.
  - Vince Byron landed the first 540 flair on a vert ramp during the BMX Vert contest and took the gold, defeating nine-time defending champion Jamie Bestwick.
  - Nicki Minaj and Metallica performed in front of massive crowds.
- 2016: X Games Austin 2016
  - Jackson Strong landed a frontflip in Moto X Best Trick and took the gold. Strong had just returned from the hospital after he crash-landed on a double backflip during the Quarterpipe competition about an hour before.
  - Jamie Bestwick won his tenth gold medal in BMX Vert, landing an Alley-oop 540 Tailwhip (which had not been done before).
  - Scotty Cranmer broke his back when his BMX bike malfunctioned while attempting a backflip double tail whip in BMX Park.
- 2017: X Games Minneapolis 2017
  - Bob Burnquist announced his retirement from the X Games, having competed every year since the first X Games in 1995.
- 2018: X Games Norway 2018
  - Leticia Bufoni won first place in 2018
- 2018: X Games Minneapolis 2018
  - Mitchie Brusco lands his second 1080 and earns his first X Games gold medal.
- 2019: X Games Minneapolis 2019
  - X Fest held at U.S. Bank Stadium, coupled with Skateboard and BMX Vert events and live musical performances at The Armory.
  - Mitchie Brusco lands the first 1260 in Skateboard Big Air, earning a silver medal.
  - Kokona Hiraki becomes the youngest ever X Games medalist in history, at 10 years of age, earning a silver medal in Women's Skateboard Park.
  - Skateboarder Gui Khury became the youngest competitor at an X Games and became the youngest person to complete a 900 at an X Games.
- 2020: X Games Minneapolis 2020
  - X Games Minneapolis 2020 was canceled due to the COVID-19 pandemic.
- 2021: X Games Southern California 2021
  - First Summer X Games to be held at professional training facilities, without an in-person audience, both due to the COVID-19 pandemic and close proximity to the 2020 Summer Olympics.
  - Events are held at 3 separate facility venues in Riverside, Ramona, and Vista
  - Gui Khury lands the first 1080 in a skateboard vert competition, winning best trick.
- 2022: X Games Japan Chiba 2022 (Spring)
  - X Games reinstates Flatland BMX competition after 19 years.
  - Women's Skateboard Street: Andrea Benitez, Momiji Nishiya, Rayssa Leal, Funa Nakayama, Aori Nishimura, Pamela Rosa, Keet Oldenbeuving ...
  - Women's Skateboard Park: Sakura Yosozumi, Cocona Hiraki, Bryce Wettstein, Dora Varella, Amelia Brodka, Yndiara Asp, Mami Tezuka, Minna Stess ...
  - Men's Skateboard Street: Felipe Gustavo, Yuto Horigome, Nyjah Huston, Kelvin Hoefler, Jagger Eaton, Zion Wright, Shane O'Neill, Sora Shirai ...
  - Men's Skateboard Park: Zion Wright, Keegan Palmer, Jagger Eaton, Liam Pace, Kensuke Sasaoka, Kieran Woolley, Luiz Francisco ...
  - Skateboard Vert: Gui Khury, Mitchie Brusco, Moto Shibata, Clay Kreiner, Jimmy Wilkins, Elliot Sloan ...
- 2022: X Games Southern California 2022 (Summer)
  - Second Summer X Games to be held at professional or private training facilities, without an in-person audience. The decision was made in 2021 due to COVID-19 protocols, but also due to positive response from athletes, who enjoyed the relaxed "backyard" format.
  - Events were held at 3 separate facility venues, one in Ramona, and two in Vista: The CA Training Facility skatepark, and Elliot Sloan's backyard vert and megaramp setup, nicknamed "The Sloanyard".
  - ESPN confirmed that moving forward, all future summer X-Games events will be in-person events open to public audiences once again.
- 2023: X Games Japan Chiba 2023 (Spring)
  - Tony Hawk has announced he will be competing once again in Skateboard Vert Best Trick.
- 2023: X Games California 2023 (Summer)
  - Competitions taking place between July 16–23, 2023 across multiple venues in Los Angeles, San Diego, and Ventura.
    - Select preliminary events (along with all event finals) will be open to the public.
    - Event finals will be taking place at Ventura County Fairgrounds.
  - First Summer X Games event in the USA since 2019 to be in-person attendance events open to the public.
  - The Tony Hawk's Vert Alert competition (taking place in Salt Lake City, UT on June 23–24, 2023) will serve as a qualifier for the skateboard vert competitions.
- 2024: X Games California 2024
  - Competitions took place in the Ventura County Fairgrounds, near downtown Ventura.
  - Skateboarder Mia Kretzer became the youngest competitor at an X Games and the youngest X Games gold medalist at the age of 9.
- 2025: X Games Salt Lake City 2025
  - The first Summer X Games event to be held in Utah.
  - First X Games to feature the updated branding to their current logo.

=== Winter X Games ===
- 1997: Winter X Games 1, Big Bear Lake, California (January 30 – February 2, 1997)
  - 38,000 in attendance
  - Cheri Elliott wins gold in Snow Mountain Biking Women's Dual Speed
- 1998: Winter X Games 2, Crested Butte, Colorado
  - 25,000 in attendance
- 1999: Winter X Games 3, Crested Butte, Colorado
  - 30,000 in attendance
- 2000: Winter X Games 4, Mount Snow, Vermont (February 3–6, 2000)
  - 83,500 in attendance
- 2001: Winter X Games 5, Mount Snow, Vermont
  - 85,100 in attendance
- 2002: Winter X Games 6, Aspen, Colorado (February 1–5, 2002)
- 2003: Winter X Games 7, Aspen, Colorado (January 30 – February 5, 2003)
  - C.R. Johnson wins bronze in Ski Superpipe.
- 2004: Winter X Games 8, Aspen, Colorado (January 22–25, 2004)
- 2005: Winter X Games 9, Aspen, Colorado (January 29 – February 1, 2005)
- 2006: Winter X Games 10, Aspen, Colorado (January 28–31, 2006)
  - Jeaux Hall landed the 1080 in the half-pipe contest after 17 attempts.
  - ESPN signed a contract with the Aspen Skiing Company to keep the Winter X Games in Colorado through 2012
- 2007: Winter X Games 11, Aspen, Colorado (January 25–28, 2007)
  - Peter Olenick landed the first double-flip (The Whiskey Flip) in halfpipe competition history, starting a revolution and setting a new standard in superpipe tricks.
- 2008: Winter X Games 12, Aspen, Colorado (January 24–27, 2008)
- 2009: Winter X Games 13, Aspen, Colorado (January 22–25, 2009)
  - Levi LaVallee attempted the first double backflip on a snowmobile.
  - Shaun White won the first back-to-back golds in Snowboard Superpipe.
- 2010: Winter X Games 14, Aspen, Colorado (January 28–31, 2010)
  - Eero Ettala won the gold medal in Men's Snowboard Slopestyle. He reached the finals with a staggering 93.33 points. The runner-up, Eric Willett, reached only 86.33 points.
- 2011: Winter X Games 15, Aspen, Colorado (January 27–30, 2011)
  - Kelly Clark landed the first 1080 by a woman in competition, in Women's Superpipe.
  - Torstein Horgmo landed the first triple cork in competition, in Men's Snowboard Big Air.
  - Shaun White became the first to four peat in Snowboard Superpipe in X Games history.
  - Sebastian Toutant wins gold as a rookie.
  - During the Snowmobile Best Trick, the brothers Colten and Caleb Moore successfully landed a two-man backflip but were disqualified because judges ruled the event as an individual sport. Daniel Bodin later took gold for the event.
- 2012: Winter X Games 16, Aspen, Colorado (January 26–29, 2012)
  - Games dedicated to the renowned freestyle skier Sarah Burke, who died on January 19, 2012.
  - Shaun White won Snowboard Superpipe for the fifth year in a row all while posting a perfect 100 for the first time in the history of either the winter or summer X Games.
  - Heath Frisby landed the first-ever front flip of a snowmobile, in Snowmobile Best Trick.
- 2013: Winter X Games 17, Aspen, Colorado (January 24–27, 2013) Mark McMorris gets a 98.00 which is the highest score in men snowboard slope style event.
  - Tucker Hibbert became the first Winter X Games athlete to six-peat in any event with his sixth gold medal in Snowmobile SnoCross.
  - Shaun White won Snowboard Superpipe for the sixth year in a row and in the process shatters the height record out of a halfpipe with a 24'1" or 7.3m backside method air.
  - Elena Hight became the first snowboarder, male or female, to land a double backside alley-oop rodeo during a halfpipe competition.
  - The first triple corks were landed in the Ski Big Air competition. Henrik Harlaut earned a perfect score with his nose butter triple cork 1620.
  - American snowmobiler Caleb Moore became the first X Games participant to die from injuries sustained at the event. He died on January 31, 2013, from complications of injuries suffered in a crash on January 24.
- 2013: X Games Tignes, France
  - Iouri Podladtchikov lands the 1st cab double cork 1440 in Men's Snowboard Superpipe.
- 2014: Winter X Games 18, Aspen, Colorado (January 23–26, 2014)
  - Tucker Hibbert became the first Winter X Games athlete to seven-peat in any event with his seventh consecutive gold medal in Snowmobile SnoCross.
  - Max Parrot wins double gold in both Men's Snowboard Slopestyle and Snowboard Big Air.
  - Yuki Kadono attempts to land the first switch bs triple cork 1620 in Snowboard Big Air.
  - Max Parrot attempts to land the first cab triple cork 1620 in Snowboard Big Air.
- 2015: Winter X Games 19, Aspen, Colorado (January 22–25, 2015)
- 2016: Winter X Games 20, Aspen, Colorado (January 28–31, 2016)
  - Max Parrot lands the first cab triple cork 1800 in Snowboard Big Air.
- 2016: X Games Oslo , Norway (February 24–28, 2016)
  - Chloe Kim scores a record 98.00 in Women's Snowboard Superpipe.
- 2017: Winter X Games 21, Aspen, Colorado (January 26–29, 2017)
  - Marcus Kleveland lands the first quadruple cork in competition history in Snowboard Big Air.
- 2018: Winter X Games 22, Aspen, Colorado (January 25–28, 2018)
  - Mark McMorris earns a bronze in men's snowboard slope style 11 months after waking from a coma.
- 2019: Winter X Games 23, Aspen, Colorado (January 24–27, 2019)
  - Men's Ski and Snowboard "Knuckle Huck" added to the X Games for the first time.
  - Kelly Sildaru scores 99.00 out of 100 on her third run in Women's Ski Slopestyle — the highest score ever awarded in an X Games slopestyle event for ski or snowboard
- 2020: Winter X Games 24, Aspen, Colorado (January 23–26, 2020)
  - Colby Stevenson earns gold in both Ski Knuckle Huck and Ski Slopestyle as an X Games rookie.
- 2020: Winter X Games Norway, Hafjell (March 7–8, 2020)
  - Mark McMorris earns 19th career medal with a gold in Snowboard Big Air to surpass Shaun White's longstanding record for male athlete with most winter medals at X Games.
- 2020: X Games Chongli 2020
  - X Games Chongli 2020 was cancelled due to the COVID-19 pandemic.
- 2021: Winter X Games 25, Aspen, Colorado (January 29–31, 2021)
  - This year's Winter X Games was held without in-person audience due to the COVID-19 pandemic. Athletes like Mark McMorris and Birk Ruud did not compete due to positive COVID-19 tests.
  - Eileen Gu earns bronze in Ski Big Air and gold in both Ski Superpipe and Ski Slopestyle as an X Games rookie.
- 2022: Winter X Games 26, Aspen, Colorado (January 21–23, 2022)
  - Alex Hall lands the first 2160 in Men's Ski Big Air.
  - Kelly Sildaru earns Ski Superpipe gold and claims the record for most X Games medals won by a teenager (10). She had previously shared the record with Shaun White and Nyjah Huston.
- 2023: Winter X Games 27, Aspen, Colorado (January 27–30, 2023)
  - Mark McMorris earns 22th career medal with a gold in Snowboard Slopestyle to surpass Jamie Anderson's record for most winter medals at X Games.
- 2024: Winter X Games 28, Aspen, Colorado (January 26-28, 2024)
  - Women's Ski and Snowboard "Knuckle Huck" added to the X Games for the first time.
  - Four live head-to-head SLVSH battles takes place as part of X Games.
  - Chloe Kim becomes first female snowboarder to land a 1260 in pipe contest.
- 2025: Winter X Games 29, Aspen, Colorado (January 23-25, 2025)
  - Hiroto Ogiwara lands the first Snowboard 2340 in Men's Snowboard Big Air.
  - Miro Tabanelli lands the first Ski 2340 in Men's Ski Big Air.
  - Italian siblings, Flora and Miro Tabanelli, both win gold in their respective Big Air events – marking the first time in X Games history that siblings win gold in the same discipline.
  - Zoi Sadowski-Synnott becomes first female snowboarder to land a triple cork 1440 in slopesyle competition.
- 2026: Winter X Games 30, Aspen, Colorado (January 23-25, 2026)
  - Scotty James earns his fifth Snowboard Superpipe gold medal in a row. His seventh in eight years. His gold medal means he is now tied with Shaun White and Chloe Kim – all three got eight Snowboard Superpipe gold medals.
  - Luca Harrington earns back-to-back Ski Slopestyle gold and back-to-back Ski Big Air silver.

== Host ==
Year	Summer	Winter	Global X Games	Asia	Middle East	Europe	North America	South America	Oceania	Asia (Winter)	Europe (Winter)
1995	(United States) Newport, Rhode Island										
1996	(United States) Newport, Rhode Island										
1997	(United States) San Diego, California	(United States) Big Bear Lake, California									
1998	(United States) San Diego, California	(United States) Crested Butte, Colorado		(Thailand) Phuket							
1999	(United States) San Francisco, California	(United States) Crested Butte, Colorado		(Thailand) Phuket							
2000	(United States) San Francisco, California	(United States) Mount Snow, Vermont		(Thailand) Phuket							
2001	(United States) Philadelphia, Pennsylvania	(United States) Mount Snow, Vermont		(Thailand) Phuket		(Spain) Barcelona					
2002	(United States) Philadelphia	(United States) Aspen, Colorado		(Malaysia) Kuala Lumpur		(Spain) Barcelona		(Brazil) Rio de Janeiro			
2003	(United States) Los Angeles, California	(United States) Aspen	(United States) San Antonio, Texas (Canada) Whistler, British Columbia	(Malaysia) Kuala Lumpur		(Spain) Barcelona		(Brazil) Rio de Janeiro			
2004	(United States) Los Angeles	(United States) Aspen		(Malaysia) Kuala Lumpur		(Spain) Barcelona		(Brazil) Rio de Janeiro			
2005	(United States) Los Angeles	(United States) Aspen		(South Korea) Seoul	(United Arab Emirates) Dubai						
2006	(United States) Los Angeles	(United States) Aspen		(Malaysia) Kuala Lumpur	(United Arab Emirates) Dubai						
2007	(United States) Los Angeles	(United States) Aspen		(China) Shanghai	(United Arab Emirates) Dubai		Mexico City				
2008	(United States) Los Angeles	(United States) Aspen		(China) Shanghai	(United Arab Emirates) Dubai		Mexico City	(Brazil) São Paulo			
2009	(United States) Los Angeles	(United States) Aspen		(China) Shanghai							
2010	(United States) Los Angeles	(United States) Aspen		(China) Shanghai							(France) Tignes
2011	(United States) Los Angeles	(United States) Aspen		(China) Shanghai							(France) Tignes
2012	(United States) Los Angeles	(United States) Aspen		(China) Shanghai							(France) Tignes
2013	(United States) Los Angeles	(United States) Aspen		(China) Shanghai		(Spain) Barcelona (Germany) Munich		(Brazil) Foz do Iguaçu			(France) Tignes
2014	(United States) Austin, Texas	(United States) Aspen		(China) Shanghai							
2015	(United States) Austin	(United States) Aspen		(China) Shanghai							
2016	(United States) Austin	(United States) Aspen				(Norway) Oslo					(Norway) Oslo
2017	(United States) Minneapolis, Minnesota	(United States) Aspen									(Norway) Hafjell
2018	(United States) Minneapolis	(United States) Aspen				(Norway) Oslo			(Australia) Sydney		(Norway) Oslo
2019	(United States) Minneapolis	(United States) Aspen		(China) Shanghai		(Norway) Oslo					(Norway) Oslo
2020	(United States) ~~Minneapolis~~	(United States) Aspen								(China) ~~Chongli~~	(Norway) Hafjell
2021	(United States) Southern California	(United States) Aspen									
2022	(United States) Ventura, California	(United States) Aspen		(Japan) Chiba							
2023	(United States) Ventura	(United States) Aspen		(Japan) Chiba							
2024	(United States) Ventura	(United States) Aspen		(Japan) Chiba							
2025	(United States) Salt Lake City, Utah	(United States) Aspen		(Japan) Osaka			(United States) ~~Sacramento~~				
2026		(United States) Aspen									

X Games League

Year	Summer			Winter		
2026	(United States) Sacramento	(Japan) Chiba	(United States) New Orleans			
2027	TBD	TBD	TBD	(United States) Aspen	(Canada) Calgary	(Finland) Ruka

== Movies ==
Two movies were filmed at the X Games. Ultimate X: The Movie was filmed at the 2001 X Games in Philadelphia, Pennsylvania and X Games 3D: The Movie was filmed at the 2008 X Games and Winter X Games in Los Angeles, California and Aspen, Colorado.
