= Tom Pagès =

French freestyle motocross rider

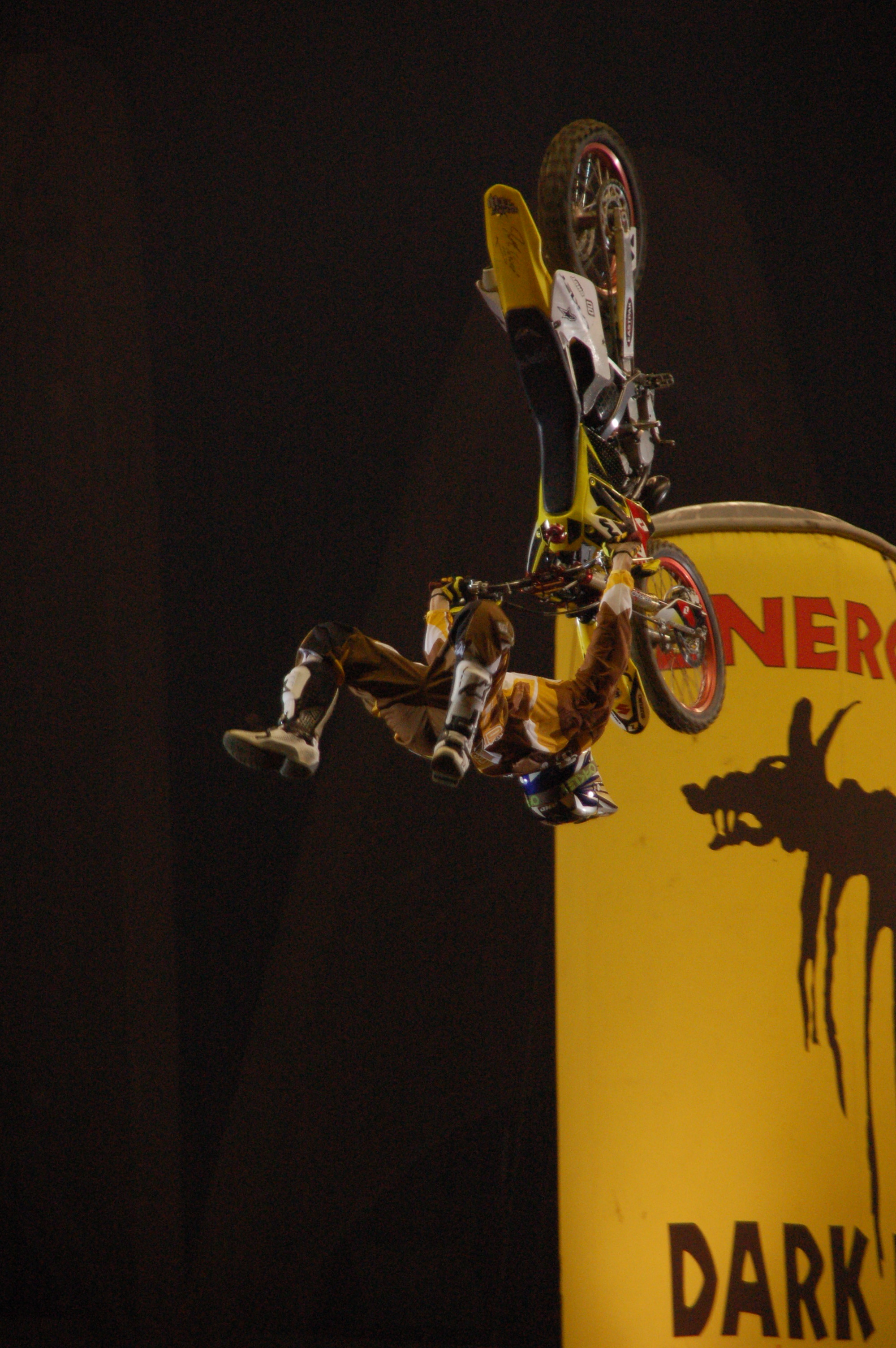
- Pagès performing in 2007

Personal information
- Full name: Thomas Pagès
- Nickname: DJ Pagès T
- Born: 25 March 1985 (age 41) Nantes, France
- Occupation: Freestyle motocross rider
- Years active: 2005–present
- Height: 5 ft 8 in (1.73 m)
- Weight: 65 kg (143 lb)
- Other interests: BMX, golf, spud guns, skydive, rallying

Sport
- Country: France
- Sport: Motocross; Freestyle motocross
- Events: X Games; Masters of Dirt; Red Bull X-Fighters; Nitro Circus live
- Team: DC Moto Team
Medal record
Summer X Games
Gold medal – first place	2015 Austin	Toyota Moto X QuarterPipe
- Updated on 14 June 2015

Thomas Pagès (born 25 March 1985) is a French freestyle motocross rider famous for his unique tricks and his style that has mostly excluded backflips for the past few years. The biggest achievements of his career were becoming the champion of the 2013 Red Bull X-Fighters world tour and winning the gold medal at X Games Austin 2015 in the Toyota Moto X QuarterPipe competition for his Bike Flip.

== Biography ==
=== Early life ===
Pagès was born on 25 March 1985 in Nantes, France, to parents Geneviève and Olivier as the youngest of three brothers. In the 1990s his parents purchased and renovated a house in the French countryside where they had plenty of space to experiment with all sorts of sports. He rode his first real motorcycle when he was 15 years old, stating that he had his first motorcycle of sorts with 19 months.

=== Early career and hiatus (2005–2009) ===
Together with his brother Charles, Pagès started with BMX racing where they suffered their first fractures of collarbones and knees along with some broken teeth. They soon went on to ride their BMXs in dirt and in order to achieve even higher jumps then switched to motor bikes. They had ridden motocross bikes on tracks before, but only built their first ramp in 2005. Pagès rode at his first freestyle show very soon after his first attempts at La Bosse de Bretagne in July 2005, though he states that his best memories stem from Bercy in 2006. He and his brother had only really been racing on their motocross bikes before receiving their invitation for the event, but showed up on the day being able to perform all the tricks of that time, including the backflip.

In November 2007, Pagès became the first person to land a Double Grab Backflip on dirt, which he repeated at MXWC in April 2008, where he came in second in the Best Trick competition. The same year, he and his brother were the first riders to catch frontflips on film and he then went on to be the first person to ever attempt a frontflip in a Freestyle Motocross competition at the Red Bull X-Fighters tour stop in Fort Worth, Texas in June 2009, but backed out in mid-air resulting in a crash from which he stood up immediately.

Later in 2009, Pagès got frustrated with the face of the competition and the constant need to perform backflips, ultimately resulting in him quitting Freestyle Motocross and even selling his bike. In a documentary that was released by Red Bull in 2014, Tom said that he had developed depression during that time and it took the help of a renowned sports psychologist to overcome it and to get back onto a bike.

Pagès' psychologist was also the person who suggested that he stop backflipping and instead focus on the tricks which he enjoyed performing. While objecting at first, Pagès further thought about the idea and ultimately decided to give it a try by performing so-called “new age tricks” that hardly any or no other riders were performing at that time, developing his own tricks and by going back to the roots of Freestyle Motocross with whips and classical right-side-up tricks.

=== Return to freestyle motocross (2010) ===
One of the first tricks, Pagès mastered was the Volt body varial which he first performed in a competition at Bercy motocross 2010. Having been under the impression that he had to better his brother's performance, Charles attempted a frontflip which he over-rotated, resulting in a crash that mostly affected his head. Tom later said that his brother had a cut under his eye that had blood rushing out of it. Charles was in coma for a week and had to learn daily tasks, such as writing, completely from scratch as his motor functions were strongly limited. Part of that was him going to circus school where he redeveloped his athletic abilities. As of 2012, Charles is back riding his bike, but not yet in a competition.

As Tom was the only source for financial income for the brothers, who had a house together in South France, near Hossegor, he went back to riding shows and demos and worked more intensely on a comeback to competition.

=== Return to Red Bull X-Fighters (2012) ===
Despite being invited from time to time, Pagès never returned to Red Bull X-Fighters until he was certain that he could be successful on the circuit, which was finally the case in 2012, when he came back for the second tour stop of the year in Glen Helen, California.

Upon his return to Freestyle Motocross competitions, Pagès still refused to do any upside down tricks like backflips, but instead focussed on bringing in his new tricks, like the Volt body varial, the 540 Flair or his very own Special Flip, and on the execution and extension in existing tricks. He became a runner up at his first event in Glen Helen, coming in fourth in Madrid and finally winning his first ever Red Bull X-Fighters event in Munich, Germany. That season he went on to battle Levi Sherwood in the closest ever final of Red Bull X-Fighters in Sydney, Australia, with both riders going into the last tour stop sharing first place in the world tour. He crashed twice on his final run, doing the Volt and attempting the first backflip, an Indy Flip, since 2009 which he jumped with the wrong gear, in a head-to-head competition against Sherwood, who went on to win the final and the 2012 Red Bull X-Fighters world tour.

=== 2013 ===
Only a few days before the start of the 2013 season, Japan’s rider Eigo Sato, who was a good friend of Pagès’, died after crashing a backflip in training, leaving behind wife and children. Pagès, along with several other riders, started an initiative to collect money to support his family. He later changed the designs of his bikes, jersey and helmets in memory of his deceased friend.

Pagès won the first event of the 2013 Red Bull X-Fighters world tour in Mexico City, Mexico in a final against Dany Torres of Spain, wearing a signed jersey of Sato's.

At the next tour stop in Dubai, Pagès was re-beaten by Sherwood in the semi-finals after crashing an Indian Air backflip, who then lost in the finals against Torres. He was the runner up in Glen Helen, where the finals had to be cancelled due to high winds and the qualifying results were announced as being final. During the qualifying, which was not broadcast, he showed a variation of the 540 Flair, combining it with a Superman. At the fourth tour stop in Osaka, Japan, where he instead showed a 540 Flair Indian Air variation, he was again the runner up, losing this time to hometown hero Taka Higashino, while the judges’ decision was heavily debated.

The day of the event in Madrid on 19 July, it was announced that the last tour stop in Pretoria, South Africa had to be cancelled as the safety of riders, staff and audience could not be guaranteed. After Josh Sheehan, his quarter-final opponent, had to pull out due to a fractured collarbone and ankle, which he suffered in a crash at the end of his second qualifying run, it was clear that Pagès had won the 2013 Red Bull X-Fighters world tour as he would at least come in third place and therefore had more points than any other rider could have achieved. Even though he didn't even have to compete to win the world tour, he went on to win his semi-final against fellow Frenchman David Rinaldo and the final against Taka Higashino. At this event, the fans finally got the see the Superman variation of the Flair while it is said that he also did a Kiss of Death Flair during the qualifying, which would be an even further stretched-out version of the Flair Superman. Also during the qualifying as well in both his semi-final and final runs, he successfully landed Cliffhanger backflips, finally breaking the curse of his former attempts. To the astonishment of both the crowd and the commentators, he announced in an on-air interview after his victory that he had not pulled out every trick during the 2013 season.

=== 2014 ===
For the 2014 season, Pagès changed his appearance, this time wearing a bright multi-coloured jersey and pants along with a new helmet design, both of which re-featured parts to remember Eigo Sato. Sato's signature is featured on the new helmet while a "R.I.P. Eigo Sato" design is placed next to his own name on the back of his jersey. On another helmet that he introduced later in the year, Sato's counterfeit is featured as the main design element on top of the helmet.

The 2014 Red Bull X-Fighters world tour did not start off as comfortable as 2013 did for Pagès. On leaving the ramp to perform his Volt body varial during his quarter-final run, a head-to-head competition against Adam Jones, the bike slightly leaned forward, making it impossible to complete the trick, resulting in a Dead Sailor (a jump without a trick). Later in the same run he crashed on his 540 Flair Superman variation and only put in a few more jumps for the audience, being out of contention to advance to the semi-finals anyway. Having come in third in the qualifying he still secured fifth place and therefore 45 points for the overall ranking. According to Pagès this was the result of him not being able to train as much as he'd liked to because of France's rainy weather. The event commentators also said that during a chat with Pagès earlier in the week, he'd said that he had to change the way he executes most of his tricks because the bike loses power in the high altitude of Mexico City. This was especially apparent in moves like the Flair where he would usually use the bike's power to start off the rotation, whereas with less power he had to use much more muscle force to induce the 540 degree twist of the bike. It is noteworthy that among the top three riders that night, only tour stop winner Levi Sherwood was riding a 250ccm bike (KTM SX 250), though it is known that he makes many alterations so the power is closer to that of a 350ccm bike. Second-placed Josh Sheehan rides a Honda CRF 450 and Dany Torres in 3rd rides a KTM SX 350.

The next event, which took place in Osaka, Japan, went even worse for Pagès. After riding in practises and the qualifying, he had to decide that he couldn't ride for safety's sake as the dirt was not good enough to perform tricks as dangerous as the 540 Flair, let alone the much talked about Bike Flip. Pagès had originally come to Japan with his only goal being to perform the Bike Flip. Because of his qualifying result he was still ranked ninth in the Osaka final results, which granted him 20 points for the overall rankings.

The first success of the season then came at the third tour stop in Madrid, Spain. Pagès managed to land the Bike Flip in all three rounds, which saw him beat Josh Sheehan in the final, despite Sheehan's flawless performance including a Double Backflip, to achieve his first victory of the season and gain 100 points. The final is considered to have been the greatest and closest ever event final in Red Bull X-Fighters history, with both riders putting down perfect runs including futuristic tricks.

The last two events of the season in Munich, Germany and Pretoria, South Africa both ended with a quarter-final exit after Pagès crashed at both events in his first run. In Munich he crashed on his second trick already, the Bike Flip, as he pushed the bike too far away from him. He was lucky to remain uninjured as the bike crashed down on him. However, it was damaged beyond immediate repair and Pagès was unable to continue his run, therefore losing the round to Germany's Luc Ackermann, a then 17-year-old FMX talent.

At the final event, which was also the 50th Red Bull X-Fighters event, he managed to bring in several tricks before crashing an initially landed Flair Tsunami. He didn't manage the full 540 degree rotation, instead landing at about 450 degrees, which resulted in him running out of space and the bike dropping down the edge of the landing hill where it got stuck in between the dirt and the quarter pipe. As he came in first and second respectively in the qualifying in those two events, he still ended up in fifth place at both events and secured 45 points each.

Pagès ended up in fourth place in the final overall rankings behind new world tour champion Josh Sheehan, Levi Sherwood and Dany Torres with 235 points.

=== 2015 ===
For the 2015 season, Pagès debuted a new bike, that he designed together with Yamaha. Everything about it was designed to be ultra-light, reaching a total weight of only 100 kg, while it also has increased power. However, while that bike clearly offers advantages for Freestyle Motocross, the new design also makes it harder to handle, as it is easier moved off course in mid-air.

Pagès started the 2015 Red Bull X-Fighters season with a quarter-final victory against Adam Jones before then losing to eventual winner Clinton Moore in the semi-finals of the Mexico City event on 6 March. It is notable that he did not show either the Bike Flip, which he debuted at the 2014 Madrid tour stop, nor his newest trick, the Alley-Oop Flair, that he announced to the public in a YouTube video on 25 February 2015, while Moore threw down a Volt, a near-perfect flatspin 540 Flair and the Bundy, a trick he invented himself and which is roughly comparable to Kyle Loza’s Electric Doom.

The next big event of Pagès' 2015 was X Games Austin 2015 where he won his first ever X Games gold medal in the Toyota Moto X QuarterPipe competition. He initially planned on doing first the Bike Flip and then the Alley-Oop Flair, but after crashing on the Bike Flip on his first try, he gave it another shot which he landed with little difficulties and received a total of 95.33 points.

At the second X-Fighters event of the year at the Dionysos Marble Quarry in Athens, Greece, Pagès put down a near-perfect quarter-final run, including the Bike Flip, the Alley-Oop Flair and a Flair off of a dirt jump, to beat last year's tour champion Josh Sheehan. In his semi-final bout against David Rinaldo, he initially landed the Alley-Oop Flair, his first jump of the run, before falling down in the slippery dirt. He got back onto his bike and still went on to beat Rinaldo in four categories, only losing the execution point, in a world's first. Never before had a rider won in head-to-head competition in Red Bull X-Fighters after a crash. However, yet another Bike Flip crash cost him the final in which his opponent was again Clinton Moore, who took home his second consecutive victory.

Pagès' first victory of the 2015 season then came in Madrid, where he bagged his third consecutive win in this venue, also a record that no rider had accomplished before him. He beat Australian rider Rob Adelberg in the quarter-finals, before re-defeating his fellow Frenchman in the semis. Crashes from Josh Sheehan and Clinton Moore meant that Levi Sherwood went on to be his final opponent, having lain down perfect runs before that, but falling victim to the soft dirt on the quarter pipe landing where he fell after a masterful showcase of his Superman transfer flip. With that, Pagès only had to lay down a good run, but upped his game by adding a Bike Flip to his already impressive arsenal of tricks of the night, and finishing off with his signature Tsunami Indy. In all three rounds, Pagès has not been beaten in one single category.

Pagès first victory was soon to be followed by a second at the fourth and penultimate stop of that year's Red Bull X-Fighters world tour in Pretoria, South Africa, Both took place in front of the Union Buildings. Pagès put down three near-perfect runs after winning qualifying the day prior to beat David Rinaldo in the quarter-finals, Josh Sheehan in the semi-finals and then finally Clinton Moore to take the win. With that victory he took first place in they overall rankings alongside Clinton Moore, who will head into the last tour stop with 280 points each.

== Trivia ==
Pagès’ role models in Freestyle Motocross are Travis Pastrana, André Villa and Manu Troux.

Pagès' favorite movie is Scarface while his favourite actor is Jim Carrey.

Pagès' favorite trick is his Tsunami Indy, while he is proudest of his Double Grab backflip, the Volt and the Special Flip.

Pagès is currently riding a Yamaha YZ250, which has been specifically altered for his purpose, and also enjoys riding a Yamaha YZF-R6 on race tracks.

Pagès' sponsors include Red Bull, Alpinestars, DC Shoes, Oakley, Yamaha, RiderZone.net, Yamalube, KS Tools, Moto Club of Pecquencourt, CTI, GPR Stabilizer, Dra¹gon tek, Spy, Bell, Bihr racing, Akrapovïc and Kutvek Graphics.

On 7 February 2014, a 52-minute documentary on Pagès' life premiered in a movie theatre in France. It was later aired on French television and was announced to be available in several languages later that year. It was broadcast in Germany and Austria before the Munich event on Servus TV on 19 July 2014, and was also available to watch on Red Bull TV for a month.

== Achievements ==
=== 2012 ===
- 1st place at Red Bull X-Fighters 2012 in Munich
- 2012 Red Bull X-Fighters world tour runner up

=== 2013 ===
- 1st place at Red Bull X-Fighters 2013 in Mexico City
- 1st place at Red Bull X-Fighters 2013 in Madrid
- 2013 Red Bull X-Fighters world tour Champion

=== 2014 ===
- 1st place at Red Bull

=== 2015 ===
- Gold medal at X Games Austin 2015 in Toyota Moto X QuarterPipe for the Bike Flip
- 1st place at Red Bull X-Fighters 2015 in Madrid
- 1st place at Red Bull X-Fighters 2015 in Pretoria

== Awards ==
- FMX Awards “Best International Freestyle Motocross Rider” 2012
- FMX Awards “Best European Freestyle Motocross Rider” 2012
