= Crusty Demons =

Group of daredevil freestyle motorcyclists

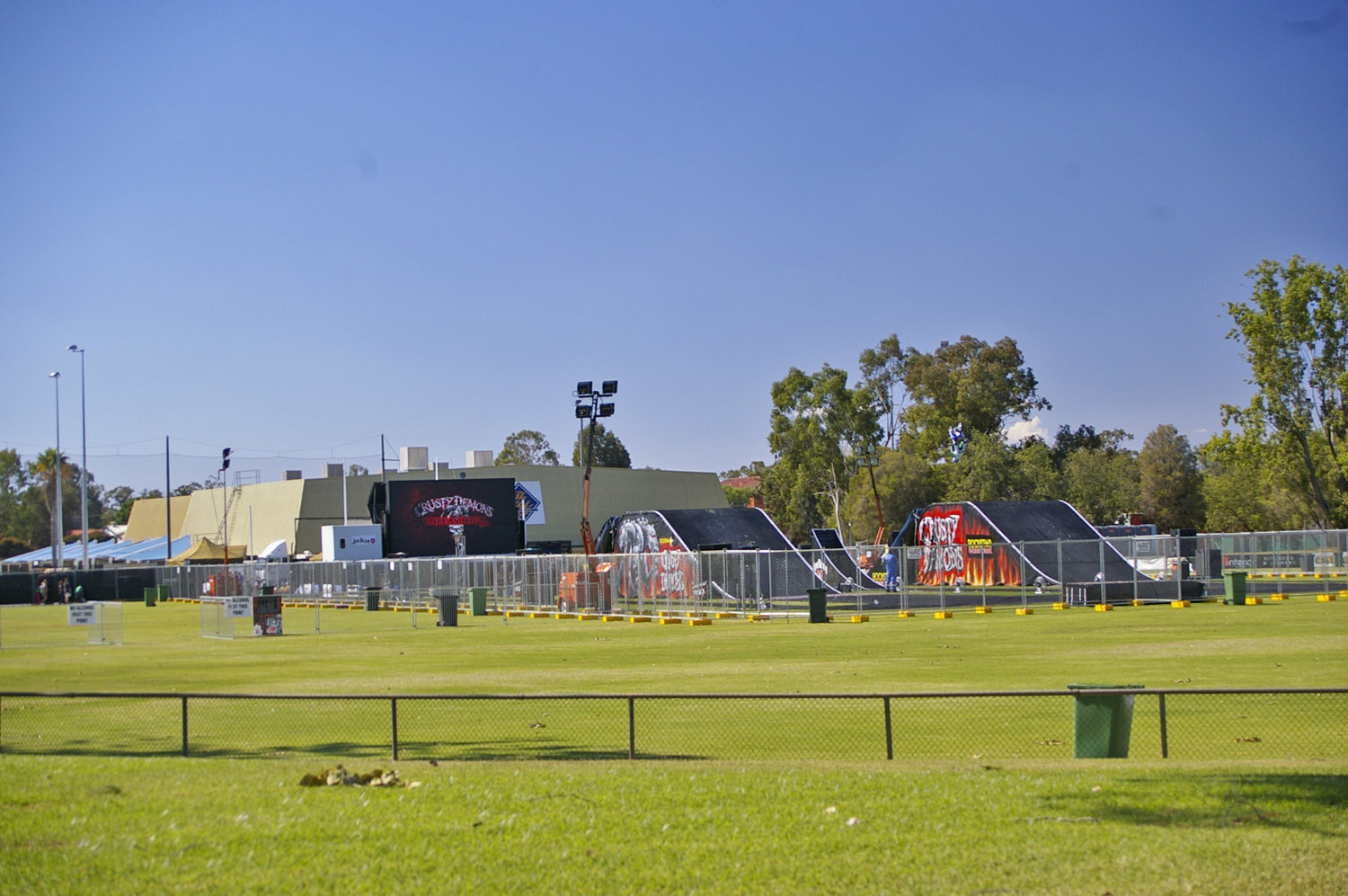
Crusty Demons Regional Australia Tour in Wagga Wagga, Australia

The Crusty Demons are a group of daredevil freestyle motorcyclists from the United States, Australia, New Zealand, and Europe. They originated in 1994 with the filming of Crusty Demons of Dirt by Fleshwound Films editor Scotty Avalos. Since then, they have been the subject of about 20 videos, and in 2007, the video game Crusty Demons was released to the public. Together the members of Crusty Demons have set 11 world records in their careers.

== Background ==
The origins of the group can be traced to 1994, when filmmakers Jon Freeman and Dana Nicholson had been accumulating footage to showcase a behind the scenes expose of the lifestyle of an American pro motocross rider in action, featuring 145 ft plus jumps, 45 ft high in the air soaring over sand dunes, mountains, houses, buses and anything else secure and steep enough to hold the weight of bike and rider. The end result was Fleshwound Films and the first video "Crusty Demons of Dirt". Crusty Demons of Dirt 2 premiered in 1996, followed by Crusty Demons of Dirt 3 in 1997.

Freestyle motocross pioneer Lofty (a.k.a. Brian Jordan) went to Fleshwound Films with the idea of staging a freestyle motocross competition. Four months later the first competition was held in Las Vegas.

Fleshwound Films also produced Fleshwound Film merchandise, which inspired their creation of the official Crusty clothing brand, Flesh gear (a freestyle ride gear and lifestyle clothing).

== Riders ==
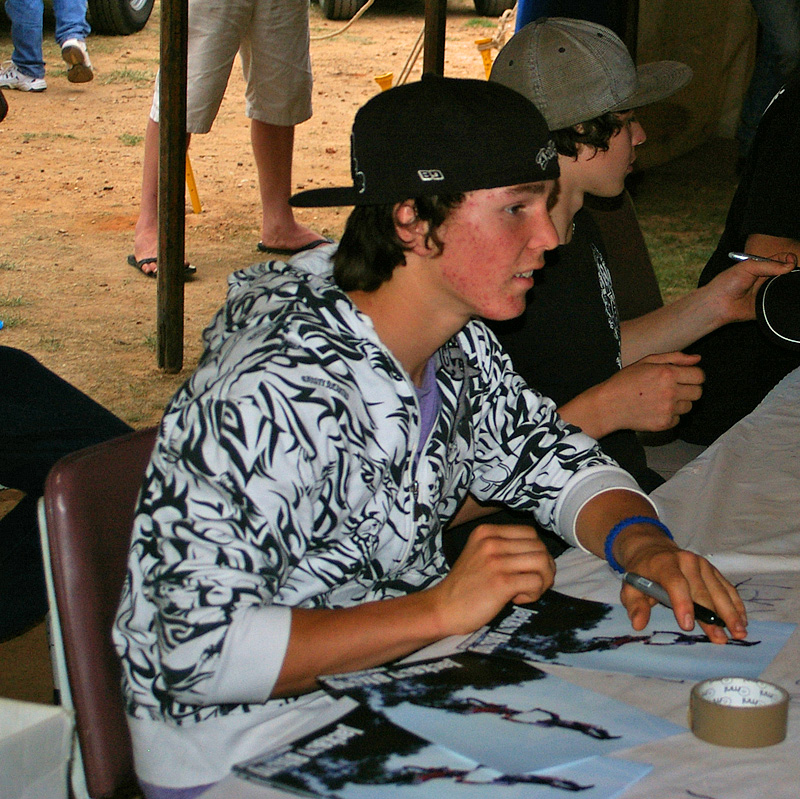
Jackson "Jacko" Strong

- Joey Flora
- Justin "Buster" Karogla
- Dana Nicholson
- Scotty Avalos
- Dan Pastor
- Brian Deegan
- Jackson Strong
- Jordan lewis
- Mike Metzger
- Jeff Emig
- Tommy "Tomcat" Clowers
- Ryan Hughes
- Larry "Link" Linkogle
- Brian Manley
- Jeremy McGrath
- Nate Adams (Destroyer)
- Jeremy Stenberg (Twitch)
- "Mad" Mike Jones
- Adam Jones
- Mike Mason
- Jim McNeil
- Seth Enslow
- Trigger Gumm
- Jon Guetter (Big G)
- Derek Guetter (Little G)
- Garry-Owen McKinnon (MACKA)
- Jimmy Blaze (Blaze)
- Justin Hoyer
- Matt Schubring (Schuie)
- Robbie Maddison (Maddo)
- Brad O'Neal
- Steve Mini
- Jackson Strong (Jacko)
- Joel Balchin
- Luke Smith (Smithy)
- Cam Sinclair (Sincs)
- James Chiasson (Bubba)
- Clifford Adopdante
- Tony Hill (TMan)
- Levi (Leverage)
- Erik Harlowe
- Mary Perkins
- Michael Norris (Chuck)
- Marcus Lewis (Mad Dewg Marcus)
- Trevor Porter (Legend) (World Number 2)
- Daniel Grant (Champion) (World Number 3)
- Alex Tubbah Noonan
- Scott Murray
- Victor Chhin
- Liam Buttigieg
- Kirstty Slama
- Travis Pastrana
- Ronnie Faisst
- Les Engle
- Carey Hart
- T. Mort

European riders:

- Mike Broeker
- León Carlos Toledano Macías
- Maikel Melero
- Gabriel "Gabi" Villada
- Kristian Linné
- Kai Haase
- Victor Marcusson
- Vanni Oddera
- Darek Klopot
- Vivian Gantner
- Cassandra Lundin 'Cassie / Stuntergirl'

=== Prominent riders ===
Nate Adams is currently ranked the number one freestyle motocross athlete in the world and Trigger Gumm held the world record for the longest jump on a motorcycle, until it was broken by Australian Robbie Maddison on December 31, 2007. Gumm was a four-time Guinness Book World Record holder for longest distance jump, breaking the record in Australia in May 2005 when he launched his Service Honda 500 cc motorcycle 277.5 feet. He also has the record for height in jumping, going vertical at 80 feet high. Seth Enslow who is also a member of the Crusty Demons set the record for the longest jump on a Harley-Davidson in March 2010 in Australia. Also Jeff Emig was a major rider in the Crusty Demons of Dirt, winning four world champion titles.

== DVD list ==
- Crusty Demons of Dirt (1995)
- Crusty Demons of Dirt 2: Twisted Metal (1996)
- Crusty Demons of Dirt 3: Aerial Assault (1997)
- Crusty Demons of Dirt 4: God Bless the Freaks (1998)
- Crusty Demons of Dirt 5: The Metal Millennium (1999)
- Crusty Demons of Dirt 6: The Next Level (2000)
- Crusty Demons of Dirt 7: The 7th Mission (2001)
- Crusty Demons of Dirt 8: The Eighth Dimension (2002)
- Crusty Demons of Dirt 9: Nine Lives (2003)
- Crusty Demons of Dirt 10: A Decade of Dirt (2004)
- Crusty Demons of Dirt 11: Chaotic Chronicle (2005)
- Crusty Demons of Dirt 12: The Dirty Dozen (2006)
- Crusty Demons of Dirt 13: Unleash Hell (2007)
- Crusty Demons of Dirt 14: A Bloodthirsty Saga (2008)
- Crusty Demons of Dirt 15: Blood Sweat & Fears (2010)
- Crusty Demons of Dirt 16: Outback Attack (2012)
- Crusty Demons of Dirt 17: World of Insanity (2013)
- Crusty Demons of Dirt 18: Twenty Years of Fears (2015)
- Crusty Demons of Dirt: Josh Anderson Dirt to Dust (2003)(TV Series)
- Crusty Demons of Dirt: Global Assault Tour (2004)
- Crusty Demons of Dirt: Night of World Records (2007)
- Crusty Demons of Dirt: Night of World Records II (2008)

== Records ==
The Crusty Demons have set the following world records:

- Longest Wheelie on a BMX - 255 feet, set by Trevor Porter
- Longest jump on a 250 cc motorcycle - 255.4 feet, set by Larry Linkogle
- Longest jump on a 125 cc motorcycle - 221 feet, set by Robbie Maddison
- Longest jump with a trick on a 250 cc motorcycle - 246 feet, set by Robbie Maddison
- Longest jump on a quad bike - 176 feet 11 inches by Jon Guetter
- Longest jump on a pro mini bike - 104 feet 7 inches by Brent Brady
- First ever backflip on a PW 50 - Daniel Grant
- Heaviest weight lifted while swallowing a sword - 22.4 kg by Chayne Hultgren
- Most swords swallowed at once - 17 by Chayne Hultgren, known as the Space Cowboy
- Longest ramp to ramp backflip - 129 feet 7 inches by Cam Sinclair
- Longest jump on a motorcycle - 351 feet by Robbie Maddison
