= X Games XVI =

2010 sporting event in Los Angeles

X Games Los Angeles 2010
- Venue: Staples Center; L.A. Live; Los Angeles Memorial Coliseum
- Location: Los Angeles, California
- Date: July 29-August 1

X Games XVI was an action sporting event which took place from July 29 – August 1, 2010 in Los Angeles, California at the Staples Center, L.A. Live and the Los Angeles Memorial Coliseum. The games featured the sports of Motocross, skateboarding, BMX, and rallying.

== Results ==
=== Motocross ===
Event	Gold		Silver		Bronze	
Moto X Adaptive	Mike Schultz	5:56.564	Todd Thompson	5:58.119	Beau Meier	6:05.787
Moto X Super X	Josh Grant	13:08.835	Justin Brayton	13:14.247	Josh Hansen	13:15.431
Women's Moto X Super X	Ashley Fiolek	6:37.142	Tarah Gieger	6:43.741	Sara Price	6:46.211
Moto X Freestyle	Travis Pastrana	80	Levi Sherwood	79	Nate Adams	71
Moto X Step Up	Matt Buyten	33'6"	Ronnie Renner	32'6"	Todd Potter	30'6"
Moto X Best Whip*	Todd Potter	54%	Jarryd McNeil	19%	Jeremy Stenberg	11%
Moto X Best Trick	Cam Sinclair	94.33	Robbie Maddison	93.66	Taka Higashino	90.66
Moto X Speed & Style	Travis Pastrana	93.97	Nate Adams	89.33	Jeremy Stenberg / Ronnie Faisst	

*Competition decided by fan text message voting.

=== Skateboarding ===
Event	Gold		Silver		Bronze	
Skateboard Big Air	Jake Brown	93.66	Bob Burnquist	93.00	Rob Lorifice	87.66
Women's Skateboard Vert	Gaby Ponce		Lyn-z Adams Hawkins		Karen Jonz	
Skateboard Vert	Pierre-Luc Gagnon	93	Shaun White	85	Andy Macdonald	79
Skateboard Vert Am	Italo Penarrubia	90	Sam Bosworth	76	Jono Schwan	70
Skateboard Vert Best Trick	Pierre-Luc Gagnon	14.33	Colin McKay	13.33	Bob Burnquist	11.33
Skateboard Street	Ryan Sheckler	92.66	Nyjah Huston	91.33	Ryan Decenzo	90.00
Women's Skateboard Street	Alexis Sablone	86.00	Leticia Bufoni	85.66	Marisa Dal Santo	83.00
Skateboard Park Legends	Christian Hosoi	86	Chris Miller	74	Steve Caballero	64
Game of SK8*	Tommy Sandoval		Sierra Fellers		Nick Trapasso	
Skateboard Park	Pedro Barros	86	Andy Macdonald	81	Kevin Kowalski	78

*Finalists determined by a best-video contest.

=== BMX ===
Event	Gold		Silver		Bronze	
BMX Freestyle Vert	Jamie Bestwick	90	Steve McCann	80	Simon Tabron	80
BMX Freestyle Park	Daniel Dhers	79	Dennis Enarson	76	Gary Young	69
BMX Freestyle Big Air	Chad Kagy	91.66	Steve McCann	89.33	Andy Buckworth	86.33
BMX Freestyle Street	Garrett Reynolds	96.33	Dennis Enarson	90.00	Brian Kachinsky	88.00

=== Rallying ===
Event	Gold	Silver	Bronze
Rally Car Racing	Tanner Foust	Brian Deegan	Andrew Comrie-Picard / Antoine L'Estage
Rally Car Super Rally	Tanner Foust	Brian Deegan	Samuel Hubinette

== Highlights ==
- Deaf rider Ashley Fiolek wins her second consecutive gold medal in Women's Moto X Super X.
- Travis Pastrana completes a Double Backflip and wins the gold medal in Freestyle Moto X after a three-year hiatus from the event.
- Cam Sinclair completes a Double Backflip and wins the gold medal in Moto X Best Trick, coming back from a devastating accident which left him in a coma for 7 days.
- Three time defending Moto X Best Trick gold medalist Kyle Loza withdraws from the competition with an injury.
- Paris Rosen crashes while attempting to complete a Front Flip in Moto X Best Trick and has to be carried away on a stretcher.
- Jake Brown and Bob Burnquist each attempt to complete the first 900 in a Skateboard Big Air competition. Both fail, and Brown wins his second consecutive gold medal.
- Pierre-Luc Gagnon wins his third consecutive gold medal in Skateboard Vert.
- 15-year-old Nyjah Huston wins the silver medal in Skateboard Street.
- 15-year-old Pedro Barros beats out 37-year-old Andy Macdonald for the gold medal in Skateboard Park. 14-year-old Curren Caples places 4th.
- Jamie Bestwick wins his fourth consecutive gold medal in BMX Freestyle Vert.
- Garrett Reynolds wins his third consecutive gold medal in BMX Freestyle Street.
- In the elimination round of BMX Freestyle Street, Sean Burns jumps out of the arena, dropping down the concrete below.
- Travis Pastrana crashes in the quarterfinal round of Rally Car Racing, eliminating him from the competition and forcing him to withdraw from Rally Car Super Rally.
