= American Freestyle Motocross Association =

American charitable organization

The American Freestyle Motocross Association (AFMXA) is a non-profit organization that represents the interests of America’s Freestyle Motocross industry, serving to formally organize the sport and support its continued growth and exposure.

The AFMXA was founded in early 2009 in memory of Jeremy Lusk, an American freestyle rider, X Games gold medalist and Metal mulisha team member who died after a crash during a competition in Costa Rica.

== Objectives ==
The AFMXA is aimed to organize, protect, and develop the sport in a collective and collaborative manner by improving rider safety, preparation and education through programs and services that will assist athletes in improving their skills and experience in the sport.

A Safer Environment The AFMXA is dedicated to increasing awareness of medical treatment, emergency response planning and training at events worldwide; encouraging neck braces for riders; reporting on standards for suitable weather conditions and proper ramp landings at events; ensuring trained on-site and on-call medical assistance; and preparing safety policies and emergency response plans. Supported by recreational riders, corporate partners and action sports companies around the globe, the AFMXA works to create a unified voice at all sanctioned and non-sanctioned freestyle motocross events, parks, facilities and demonstrations, calling for more education and better preparation in order to provide a safer environment for athletes.

Athlete Recognition In addition to providing guidelines for safer practices, the AFMXA hosts an annual awards ceremony to recognize top athletes and companies for their accomplishments and influence on the sport.

== Membership ==
Membership for the AFMXA is categorized into three levels; public, professional and corporate. Professional riders currently supported by the services provided by AFMXA include Brian “The General” Deegan, Blake "Bilko" Williams, Jeremy “Twitch” Stenberg, and Nate Adams. Corporate supporters: Kendall Mowery, Denny Ray Creech Jr.

== Advisory board ==
The AFMXA’s advisory board consists of prominent figures in the action sports and medical industries. Current board members include Metal Mulisha founder and the most decorated Freestyle Motocross rider in X Games history, Brian Deegan; CEO of La Jolla Group, Toby Bost; ESPN’s Lizz Leach; Transworld’s Marc Fiore; Ryan Hagy; Cameron Steele; Dr. Pete Katsyiannis; and Dr. Gus Gialamas. Metal Mulisha Rider Ronnie Faisst is the official spokesperson for the Association.

== Lusk Legacy Foundation ==
The Lusk Legacy Foundation ("LLF"), founded shortly after Jeremy Lusk’s death, has been named the official charitable organization for the AFMXA. The LLF is dedicated to improving overall safety in the sport at both the professional and recreational levels by protecting the livelihoods of the riders and their families in the event of severe injury and/or death, and provides them with legal, medical and financial consultation and representation.
