= X Games Minneapolis 2017 =

Action sporting event in July 13-16, 2017

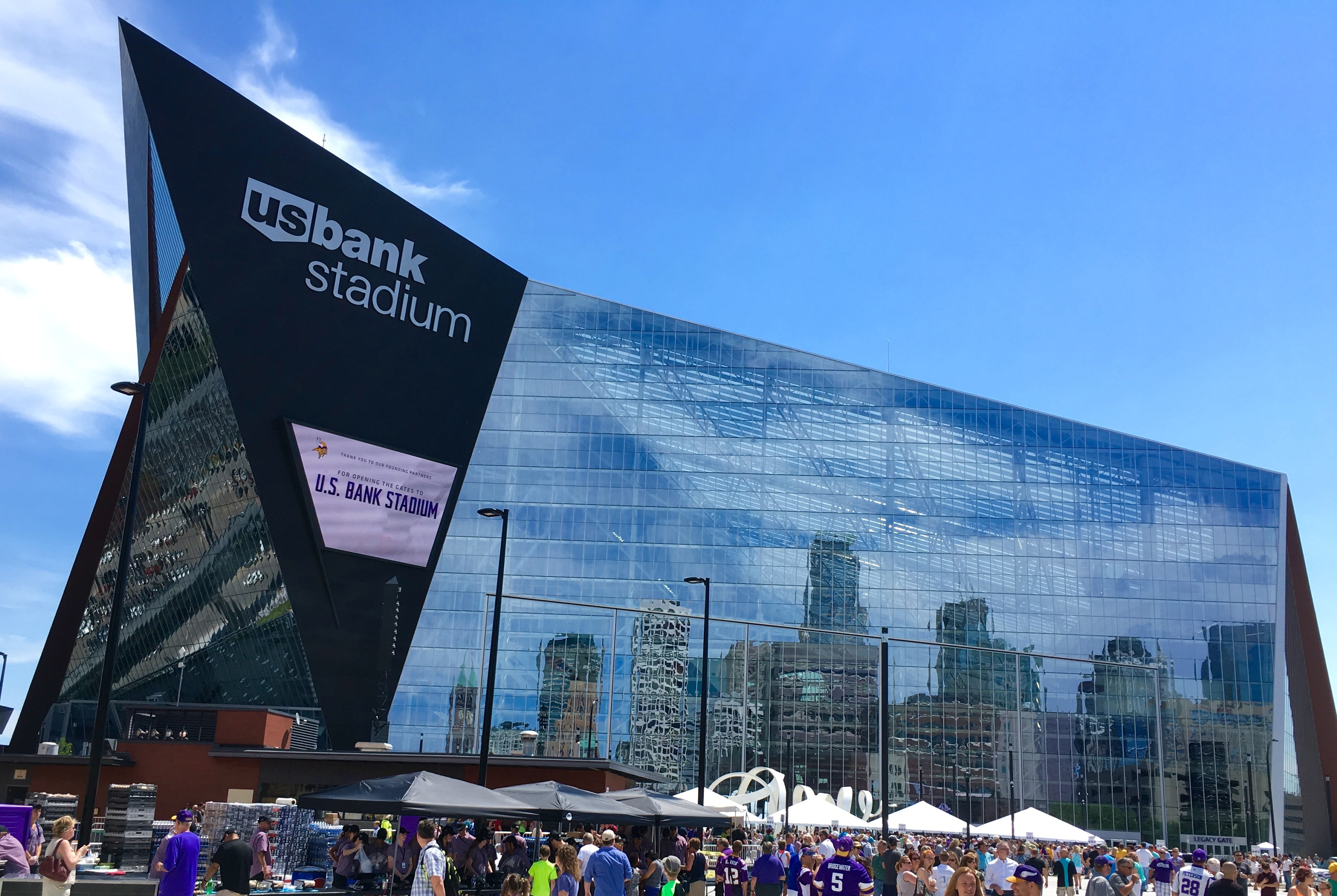
- Venue: U.S. Bank Stadium
- Location: Minneapolis, Minnesota
- Date: July 13–16

X Games Minneapolis 2017 is an action sporting event that took place July 13–16, 2017, at U.S. Bank Stadium in downtown Minneapolis, Minnesota.

This Summer X Games was the first held in the Midwest and the first of two X Games events to be held in the state of Minnesota with another planned for the following summer in 2018. The games were televised by ESPN and ABC.

== Bids ==
After the three-year agreement with Circuit of the Americas, ESPN opened up a bid process to any US city that meet the event requirements to host the 2017 and 2018 Summer X Games.

Minneapolis beat out several other cities including Fort Lauderdale, Florida (BB&T Center), Providence, Rhode Island, and Long Island, New York, after Austin, Texas served as the host the past three games.

Detroit, Michigan was seen a front-runner for these games as they were a past runner-up, however they did not submit a bid due to a scheduling issue with Ford Field and Joe Louis Arena.

Other cities that had interest included Charlotte, North Carolina at Charlotte Motor Speedway in Concord, North Carolina and Chicago, Illinois.

== Day by day ==
=== Thursday ===
The games began on Thursday, July 13, 2017. Three final events were held this day. Starting off was the BMX Vert Final, where Australian Vince Byron won gold, edging out the United Kingdom's Jamie Bestwick. The second final of the day, the Skateboard Vert Final, ended with Moto Shibata winning the gold, becoming the first Japanese competitor to win a gold medal at the X Games. In the final event of the day, American Sammy Halbert won the Harley-Davidson Flat Track event.

=== Friday ===
On Friday, July 14, four event finals were held. The first final was the BMX Street Final, which concluded with American Garrett Reynolds capturing the gold. Following that final came the Women's Skateboard Street Final, where fifteen year old Japanese skateboarder Aori Nishimura obtained the gold medal. The final events continued with the BMX Big Air Final, which resulted in American James Foster receiving gold. The day concluded with the Moto X Freestyle final, which saw New Zealand's Levi Sherwood capture his first gold medal at the X Games.

=== Saturday ===
Saturday, July 15, was the biggest day for final events with eight being held. Starting off the day was the BMX Dirt Final, where American Colton Walker claimed gold. Next up was the Moto X Step Up Final which ended with Australian Jarryd McNeil taking home the gold. In the third final event of the day, American Elliot Sloan won gold at the Skateboard Big Air Final. The fourth event of the day was the Skateboard Street Amateur Final. Seventeen year old American Jagger Eaton won the gold. The fifth final event of the day was the Men's Skateboard Street Final, which ended with Kelvin Hoefler of Brazil obtaining the gold. The Women's Skateboard Park Final followed, with thirteen year old American Brighton Zeuner winning gold, and becoming the youngest person ever to win gold at the X Games. The second to last event final of the day was the Moto X Best Whip Final. In this event, American Destin Cantrell won the gold. The final event, the Moto X Best Trick Final, resulted in New Zealander Levi Sherwood winning gold.

=== Sunday ===
Sunday, July 16, was the final day of the X Games, with four event finals left. The first final was the BMX Dirt Final, where American Colton Walker received the gold. At the second final, the Skatepark Skate Final, American Alex Sorgente won the gold. Australian Kyle Baldock won the "gold pedal" at the BMX Best Trick event. The final event of the X Games was the Moto X Quarterpipe High Air Final. In this final, American Colby Raha won the gold followed by American Tyler Bereman receiving the silver medal.

== Results ==
=== Medal count ===
FINAL

* Host nation (United States)

Rank	Nation	Gold	Silver	Bronze	Total
1	United States (USA)*	11	11	13	35
2	Australia (AUS)	5	7	3	15
3	Japan (JPN)	2	0	0	2
3	New Zealand (NZL)	2	0	0	2
5	Brazil (BRA)	1	0	1	2
6	Great Britain (GBR)	0	1	0	1
7	Italy (ITA)	0	0	2	2
8	Chile (CHI)	0	0	1	1
8	Czech Republic (CZE)	0	0	1	1
Totals (9 entries)		21	19	21	61

=== Skateboard ===
Event	Gold		Silver		Bronze	
Skateboard Vert	Moto Shibata (JPN)	90.00	Jimmy Wilkins (USA)	89.00	Mitchie Brusco (USA)	88.66
Women's Skateboard Street	Aori Nishimura (JPN)	87.66	Samarria Brevard (USA)	84.66	Letícia Bufoni (BRA)	82.00
Skateboard Big Air	Elliot Sloan (USA)	94.00	Tom Schaar (USA)	91.66	Clay Kreiner (USA)	88.00
Skateboard Street Amateurs	Jagger Eaton (USA)	91.66	Zach Saraceno (USA)	72.00	Alex Midler (USA)	68.66
Men's Skateboard Street	Kelvin Hoefler (BRA)	92.33	Alec Majerus (USA)	88.66	Nyjah Huston (USA)	88.00
Women's Skateboard Park	Brighton Zeuner (USA)	88.66	Jordyn Barratt (USA)	86.66	Poppy Olsen (AUS)	83.66
Men's Skateboard Park	Alex Sorgente (USA)	88.33	Tom Schaar (USA)	86.00	Cory Juneau (USA)	82.33

=== BMX ===
Event	Gold		Silver		Bronze	
BMX Vert	Vince Byron (AUS)	93.00	Jamie Bestwick (UK)	92.66	Coco Zurita (CHI)	88.00
BMX Street	Garrett Reynolds (USA)	89.33	Devon Smillie (USA)	87.00	Simone Barraco (ITA)	85.66
BMX Big Air	James Foster (USA)	94.33	Vince Byron (AUS)	92.33	Kurtis Downs (USA)	88.33
BMX Park	Kevin Peraza (USA)	90.33	Logan Martin (AUS)	87.33	Daniel Sandoval (USA)	87.00
BMX Dirt	Colton Walker (USA)	93.00	Logan Martin (AUS)	91.33	Kyle Baldock (AUS)	88.66
BMX Park Best Trick	Kyle Baldock (AUS)	93.66	Logan Martin (AUS)	92.66	Pat Casey (USA)	92.00

=== Moto X ===
Event	Gold		Silver		Bronze	
X Games Harley-Davidson Flat-Track Racing	Sammy Halbert (USA)	6:26.085	Jared Mees (USA)	6:38.857	Brad Baker (USA)	6:41.828
Moto X Freestyle	Levi Sherwood (NZL)	92.33	Josh Sheehan (AUS)	90.66	Clinton Moore (AUS)	90.00
Moto X Step Up	Jarryd McNeil (AUS)	44.00	Bryce Hudson (USA)	43.00	Libor Podmol (CZE); Ronnie Renner (USA); Massimo Bianconcini (ITA)	39.00
Moto X Best Whip	Destin Cantrell (USA)	44.00	Jarryd McNeil (AUS)	25.00	Tyler Bereman (USA)	17.00
Moto X Best Trick	Levi Sherwood (NZL)	92.33	Jackson Strong (AUS)	91.00	Clinton Moore (USA)	88.00
Moto X Quarterpipe High Air	Colby Raha (USA)	355.00	Tyler Bereman (USA)	341.00	Brian McCarty (USA)	234.00
