= Robbie Maddison =

Australian motorcycle racer (born 1981)

Robert William Maddison
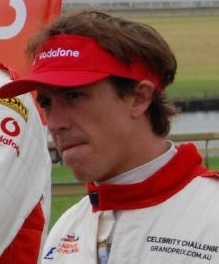
- Maddison at the 2008 Australian Grand Prix Celebrity Challenge
- Born: 14 July 1981 (age 45); Caringbah, Sydney, Australia
- Other names: Robbie Maddison, Maddo
- Occupation: Motorbike rider
- Known for: World record length motorcycle jump, surfing on a dirt bike
- Website: www.robbiemaddison.com

Robert William Maddison (born 14 July 1981) is an Australian motorbike stunt performer. Nicknamed 'Maddo', he is from the town of Kiama, New South Wales.

== Background ==
Born in Caringbah, Maddison grew up in Kiama Downs, and developed his passion for riding by competing in national motocross and supercross events. He completed Year 10 at Kiama High School and took up an electrical apprenticeship. Maddison continued learning freestyle motocross (FMX) tricks and after becoming proficient in the skills he entered his first amateur event, and won both the amateur and professional events at Bacchus Marsh, Victoria.

== Early career ==
In early 2004, Maddison won Gold at the X Games held at Australia's Wonderland after completing 13 back flips.

In May 2005, the Crusty Demons motorcycle stunt group gave Maddison the opportunity to break two world records on his motorbike:

- 125 cc (cubic centimetres of engine displacement) Distance Guinness world record: 221 feet (67 m)
- 250 cc Distance world record with a trick – 246 feet (75 m) 'superman seat grab'.

== Career ==
After this, Maddison went on to win numerous international FMX events around the world and has been recognized as one of the best FMX riders of all time. Maddo's motto: "Face your fears – live your dreams"

On 31 December 2007, (on the 40th anniversary of Evel Knievel jumping the fountains at Caesars Palace), and live on the ESPN cable TV network, Maddison broke the World motorcycle jumping record, travelling 98.34m on a motorbike. He repeated the event immediately afterward, successfully landing the jump, as his fiancée Amy looked on. His second attempt, however, did not go as far as the first jump; he was not injured in either jump.

On 29 March 2008, Maddison broke his own world record twice during the Crusty Demons Night of world Records show in Melbourne, Australia. During his first jump he travelled 316 feet (96.32 m) and landed on the safety zone nearly hitting the front of the landing ramp. On his second attempt Maddison broke the world record by travelling 342 feet 7 inches (104.42 m). This time he landed hard on his back tyre and was not satisfied by the jump, so he decided to jump once more. On his third jump he again broke the world record, this time with 106.98m (350.98 feet) into a perfect landing.

On 1 January 2009, live on ESPN, Maddison and his Yamaha YZ 250 motorbike successfully jumped 96 feet (29 m) up onto the Arc de Triomphe in front of Paris Las Vegas and then descended an 80-foot (24 m) drop off the monument safely to ground level. Maddison said after the jump that he may have broken his hand and had a gash to the bone in the webbing of his left hand.

On 30 May 2009, Maddison indicated he was more than just a stuntman by defeating the world's best freestyle riders at the Calgary, AB, Canada stop of the Red Bull X-Fighters competition. His victory in the Head-to-Head competition meant he had to progress through three rounds, defeating multiple X Games medallist Nate Adams (USA) in the first, defending series champion Mat Rebeaud (SUI) in the semi-final round and then 30-year-old series veteran Eigo Sato (JPN) in the final.

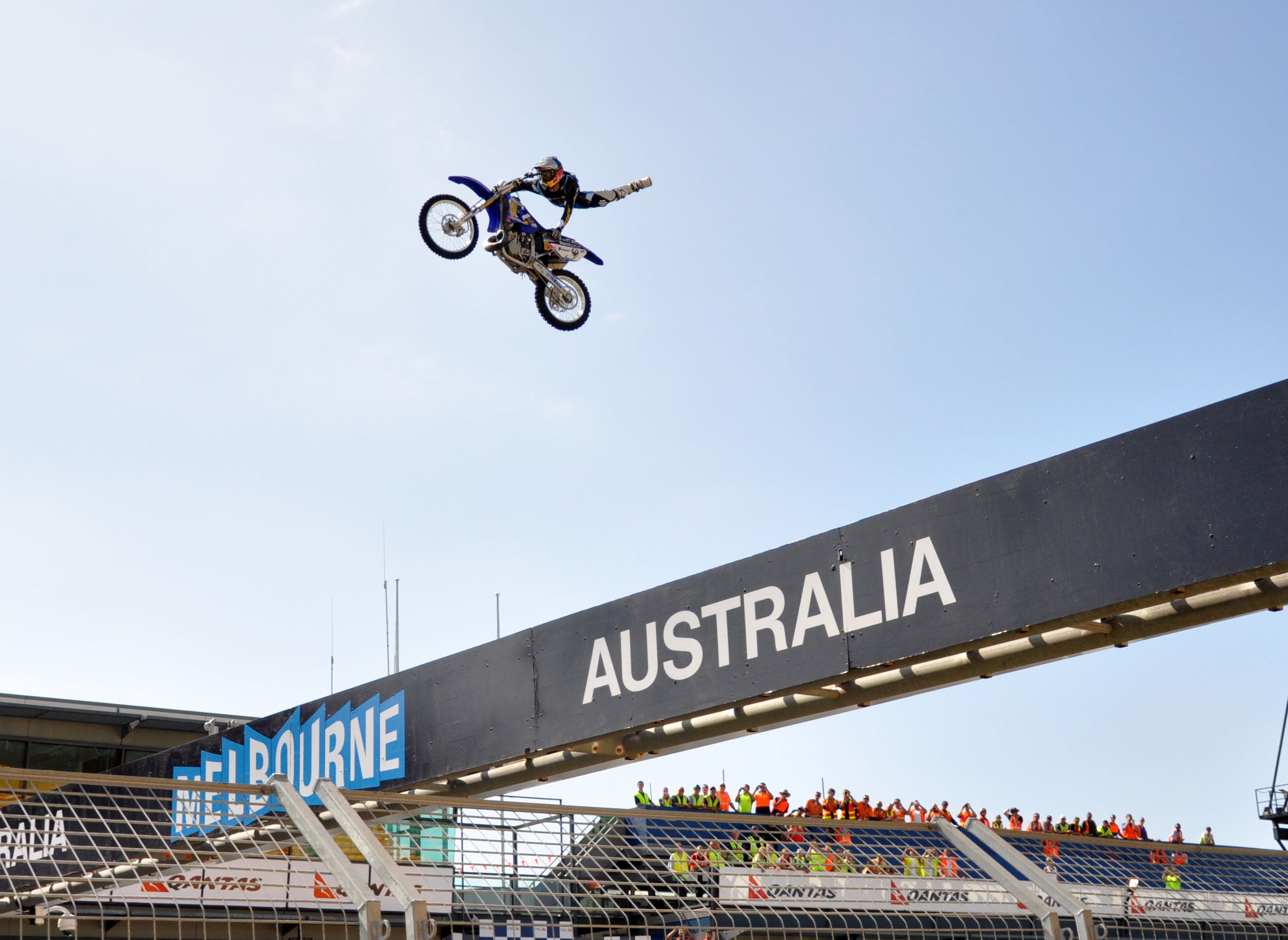
Maddison jumping the start gantry at the 2010 Australian Grand Prix

On 13 July 2009, Maddison jumped Tower Bridge in London, with a backflip, whilst the drawbridge was open by 25 feet.

The following weekend, Maddison went on to the Red Bull X-Fighters championship in Madrid, winning the best trick contest with a brand new trick, an 'under flip one hander to side saddle lander'.

In March 2010, Maddison become the first person to jump the start gantry at the Formula One in Melbourne, Australia.

On 7 April 2010, Maddison performed a motocross jump over the Corinth Canal in Greece. That made him the first FMX rider who accomplished to cross over the canal on his motorbike. He took off with a speed of 120 km/h and jumped over more than 80m. About the jump, Maddison said: "Jumping across the Corinth Canal became a challenge I just could not resist. This jump involved the highest consequences I have faced so far. I believe that sometimes you have to take risks in life to become wiser and facing a challenge like this will help get me ready for the next aim I will face in the future. I am thrilled about managing to pull it off, as you know there is only one opportunity to get it right!"

On 31 December 2011, Maddison attempted to jump 400 feet across San Diego Bay as part of Red Bull New Year No Limits, in a tandem jump with American snowmobile racer Levi LaVallee. After landing over 391 ft in practice, he landed shy of the 400 feet goal on the night due to the fog, damp conditions and reduced traction, landing 378 ft, 9 inches.

Maddison went to Istanbul early in 2012 to be the motorbike stunt double for James Bond actor Daniel Craig in the Bond movie Skyfall. He went on to receive a Screen Actors Guild Award for best stunt ensemble for Skyfall. In 2013 he went on to win the Taurus World Stunt Awards for "best stunt with a vehicle."

In April 2015, Maddison successfully rode a modified dirt motorbike on a wave near Teahupoo in Tahiti, after two years of preparation for the event.

In 2016, Maddison developed a special edition snow bike in cooperation with YETI SnowMX, the 2017 'Special Edition Robbie Maddison YETI SnowMX snowbike'.

In 2017, Maddison appeared in the movie XXX: Return of Xander Cage, performing as a stunt double for actor Vin Diesel as he rode a motorbike on the ocean.

On 4 February 2017, Maddison claimed on his Facebook page that, "I set a new world record yesterday on distance ridden on the water", showing photos of his distance of 19.8 miles in a time of 31.29 at a top speed of 45 mph happening on 3 February 2017.

== Sponsors and partnerships ==
Maddison's sponsors include Red Bull, Skullcandy, Swatch, Dunlop Sport, DC Shoe Company, Arnette, KMC, KTM, mophie, Parts Unlimited, Crusty.com, Stompgrip, Cernics, FMF Racing, VP racing fuels, Amerigas, Acerbis, Works Connection, Hammerhead, Pro Taper and Sony Action Cam. He also has a partnership with YETI SnowMX and C3 Powersports for a 2017 'Special Edition Robbie Maddison YETI SnowMX snowbike'.
