= Red Bull X-Fighters =

Former freestyle motocross motorbike stunt competition

- Sport: Freestyle Motocross
- Founded: 2001
- First season: 2001
- Folded: 2017
- Owner: Red Bull GmbH
- Singles entrants: 12
- Country: Spain
- Venue: Las Ventas
- Confederation: Europe
- Last champion: Levi Sherwood (9th title)
- Most titles: Levi Sherwood (9 titles)
- Sponsor: Red Bull GmbH
- Website: RedBullX-Fighters.com

Red Bull X-Fighters was a freestyle motocross stunt competition organized by Red Bull from 2001 to 2017. During its years of operation, it staged 50 events on six continents in bullrings, famous locations, and sites.

Competing riders went head-to-head in a series of knockout rounds. Their jumps and routines were judged by a panel that awarded points based on eight criteria: execution, energy, excitement and entertainment, among others.

== History ==
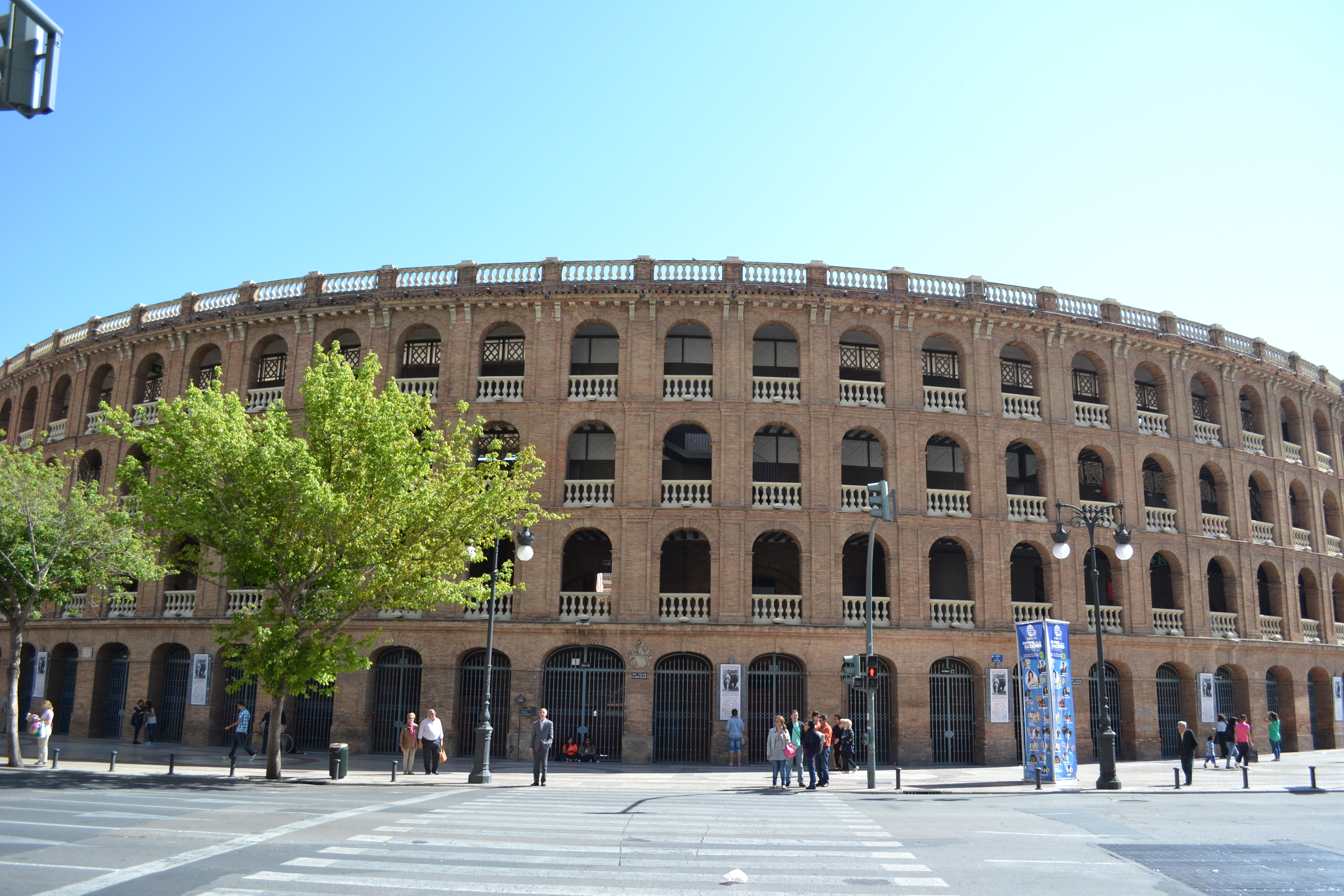
X-Fighters inaugural venue, the Plaza de Toros de Valencia

=== X-Fighters: 2001–2006 ===
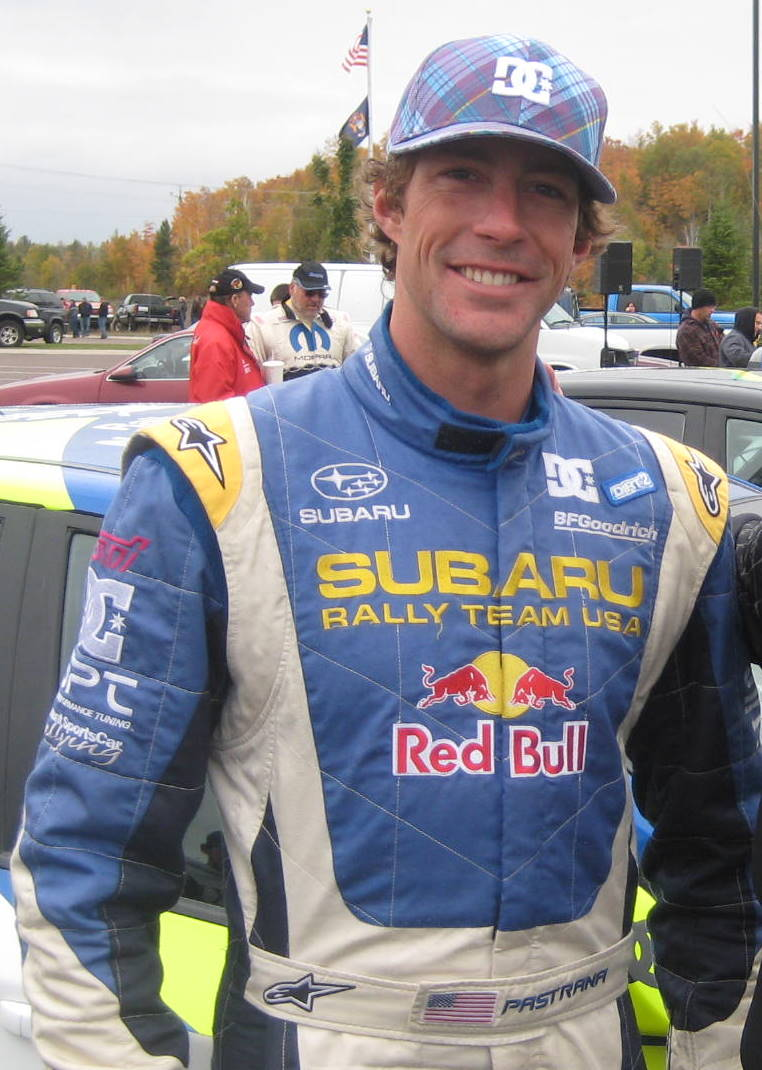
Madrid 2004 & 2006 champion, Travis Pastrana

X-Fighters was founded in 2001, with the Plaza de Toros de Valencia in Spain being the first venue to host the competition. A 12,000 person crowd was recorded with American Mike Jones taking the win in the inaugural event, Spaniard Edgar Torronteras coming second and French rider Xavier Fabre coming third. Red Bull X-Fighters returned for a second time in 2002 at Madrid's Las Ventas, with about 20,000 people in attendance. Edgar Torronteras, who came in second in the previous edition, won the event and took the trophy that season.

Two events were hosted in 2003, with Valencia and Madrid staging competitions in their bullrings. At Las Ventas in Madrid, a new rider was added to the competition, 18-year-old Nate Adams from the US, who performed the first ever back flip at the event.

The riders then returned to compete in the bull ring of Madrid for the only X-Fighters event of 2004. Riders regularly performed back flips along with new combinations of back flips. Travis Pastrana joined the X-Fighters event and took first. Nate Adams came second after going in head-to-head battles for the majority of the event. The following year, after success in Spain, X-Fighters staged its first event outside of Europe. Growing in popularity, the 2005 event took place in front of a crowd of 40,000 at the biggest bullring in the world, the Plaza de Toros México in Mexico City. Ronnie Renner won this edition of the event. After Mexico, Madrid hosted yet another event in the same year, won by Nate Adams. In 2006, Mexico City and Madrid again hosted the event, with the Mexican event being won by Swiss rider Mat Rebeaud and the Madrid event being won by Travis Pastrana.

=== World Tour: 2007–2015 ===
In 2007, X-Fighters started their World Tour series as they moved into exclusive bullring locations in new arenas. The tenth competition took place in Mexico City. For the next stop of the World Tour, X-Fighters built a custom arena near Slane Castle in Ireland. Travis Pastrana came first in the event after tackling a wet course due to rainfall. After Ireland, the world tour returned to Madrid. Pastrana rode to his second consecutive win that season.

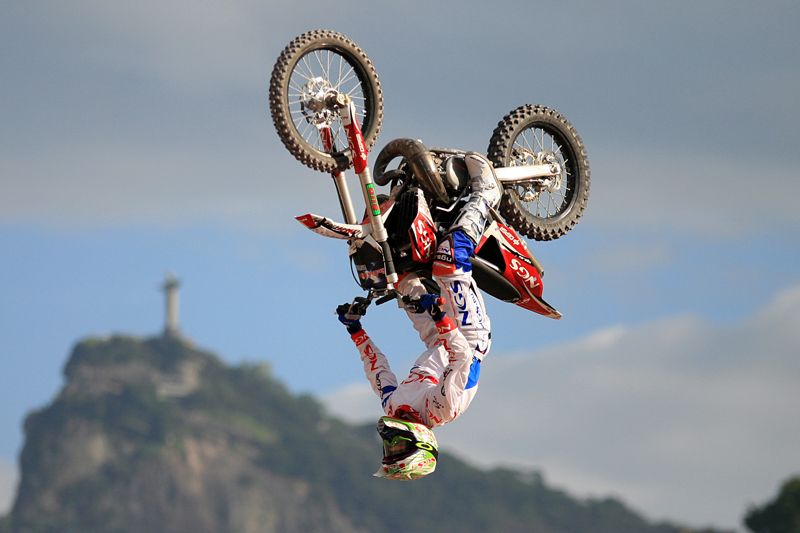
Dany Torres at the Rio de Janeiro event

2008 increased the lineup of stops from three in 2007 to six. The first event took place in Mexico, after which the tour traveled to the Sambadrome in Rio de Janeiro before taking place in Texas. The European Leg of the tour included events in Spain, Germany and Poland. The first event was in Plaza de Toros México. A 17-year-old from New Zealand, Levi Sherwood, made his debut. After a closely fought contest in Calgary, Canada, the tour returned to Texas. The course built in Fort Worth was one of the biggest courses created. Cam Sinclair successfully performed the double back flip, becoming the first rider to perform it in a competition. Moving on to the next event in Madrid, Sinclair again attempted the double back flip, but suffered a crash and sustained severe injuries along with extensive internal bleeding. With Sinclair in recovery, the 2009 tour ended with Red Bull X-Fighters twenty-third event and a first for London with the finale at Battersea Power Station.

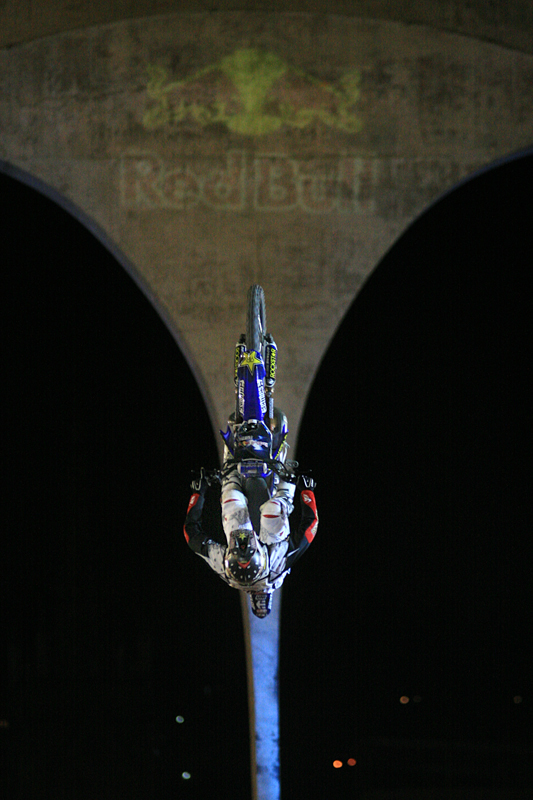
Jeremy Stenberg at an X-Fighters event

In 2010, Red Bull X-Fighters were granted permission to stage an event in Moscow's Red Square right beside the Kremlin, using it as their backdrop. Along with this another event took place in the Giza Plateau in Egypt with the Great Sphinx of Giza in the background. Red Bull X-Fighters then returned to Madrid, with Australian Robbie Maddison pulling off a body varial. A first ever seen trick in the competition, Maddison went on to win the event of the year. At the next event in London, Maddison bailed in an attempt at the volt badly, ending his season. After the UK stop, X-Fighters wrapped up its twenty-ninth event by rounding off the 2010 tour in Italy where Nate Adams achieved another first to add to his Red Bull X-Fighters career. Being the first rider to claim a second title for a second consecutive year.

2011 brought up its 30th event on Jumeirah Beach in Dubai. The tour then staged round two of the championship in front of the Monumental Axis in the Brazilian capital, Brasília. In front of a crowd of over 100,000 people, was the biggest FMX attended event in the history of the sport. Following the events in Rome, Madrid, and Poznań, the tour ended in a grand finale on Cockatoo Island in the heart of Sydney Harbour, Australia. Competing in front of his home crowd for the first time was Australia's Josh Sheehan. He secured the last win of 2011. But the tour title that year belonged to Dany Torres. In 2012, the Red Bull X-Fighters tour started in Dubai. In Glen Helen, Red Bull created the biggest course ever constructed. After the huge course, the tour moved to Europe in Madrid where New Zealander Levi Sherwood secured victory and extended his lead in the overall standings. Next up was Munich's Olympic Stadium. The leading man was Tom Pagès. The tour was set for a close finale on Cockatoo Island in Australia. He saw Jackson Strong perform X-Fighters first front flip and did it again one handed. But it came down to the overall current first and second place riders to meet in the final for a chance to win the World Tour title. It was Sherwood who beat Pagès after he performed the tricks and style to take the 2012 title.

=== Grand Slam: 2016–present ===
After eight years of the Red Bull X-Fighters World Tour, 2016 concentrated on one season highlight event at the Plaza de Toros de Las Ventas in Madrid on June 24. The Red Bull X-Fighters stop in Madrid marked the 15th straight year that the bullring hosted the event of Freestyle Motocross, where riders from all across the world came to perform. France's Tom Pagès became the first rider in history to win Madrid three consecutive times with his victory in 2015 in front of 23,000 spectators. Travis Pastrana of the USA had also won Madrid three times but not consecutively while Spanish rider Dany Torres had won twice.

It was Tom Pagès who set records with a fourth straight Red Bull X-Fighters win in Madrid, the home of freestyle motocross that celebrated its 15th anniversary. At the Las Ventas bullring Pagès performed his new Front Flip Flair, the first time ever the trick was performed in competition. In a three-way battle, Clinton Moore, the 2015 World Tour champion, came in second place after his Bundy jump was recorded to be 14 meters high by a new Intel device. Josh Sheehan took third place despite landing his signature double back flip. Levi Sherwood of New Zealand finished fourth at the FMX extravaganza in the Spanish capital.

2017 would begin with Las Ventas hosting an X-Fighters contest. Levi Sherwood took 1st place with Josh Sheehan taking 2nd and Taka Higashino coming in 3rd. 2017 would end up being the final year of Red Bull X-Fighters.

== Format ==
=== Event ===
Each event consists of multiple days, with riders having opportunities to train. The first day includes a briefing, followed by qualification on the second day and competition on the third day. During qualification, riders complete a single 90-second qualifying run in their designated start order. Any rider who misses the qualifying session is assigned the last-place position. If multiple riders miss the session, their placement is determined by the previous year's Tour ranking, with the lowest-ranked rider placed last. In the absence of a Tour ranking, a draw is held to determine the riders' ranks for qualifying purposes. The results of the qualification will define the three groups of four riders that will compete in the Cuadrillas Elimination.

The Cuadrillas Elimination is where each group of four riders will spin a roulette of tricks one time (old-school tricks that are barely shown in competition). All riders have to pull out this trick within their 50-second run. The best two riders of each group qualify for the semi-final. At the completion of each rider's run, the judges award a score. When all riders in this round have completed a scored run, the scores are announced and the top scored rider advances through to the semi-final. Six riders are then qualified in pairs and battle head-to-head in the semi-final, in which there is no mandatory trick. Each rider takes his own run with a predetermined time limit (75 seconds). The lower seeded rider in each pair rides first. Time starts when the rider takes his first jump. After each run, the rider goes to a predesignated position to watch his replays on the big screen. The second rider in the pair, who is not riding, will wait at the Hot Spot, remove his helmet and watch the other rider's run. After the second rider's run, both wait at a predesignated position for the judges' decision of which of the two will proceed to the final round. The winner from each battle would advance to the final.

The final consists of three winners from the semi-final that meet in a head-to-head run-off. Each rider takes his own run with a predetermined time limit (75 seconds). The rider from the semi-final A will ride first followed by the winner of the semi-final B and C. Time will start when the rider takes his first jump. After the 75 seconds, each rider can perform a Bonus Trick which is not affected by the time limit. After each run, the rider goes to a predesignated position to watch his replay on the big screen. The second and third riders, who are not riding, will wait at the Hot Spot, remove their helmet and watch the other riders run. After the third rider's run, all three wait at a predesignated position for the judges' decision of whom of the three will be celebrated as the winner of the Red Bull X-Fighters competition. Overall the riders can win five helmets. If there is a tie (e.g. two riders win two helmets and one rider 1 helmet) the Bonus Tricks decides on the winner.

=== Judging ===
Judging in all rounds consists of five judges, each one judging the overall impression based on the following criteria:

- Variety
- Execution
- Form and flow
- Use of course
- Challenge
- Energy
- Excitement
- Entertainment

There are two separate judging systems for the Red Bull X-Fighters competition. Round one judging panel comprises five judges, plus one Head Judge. These judges award each rider a score from 1-100 points. The final score is represented as a number from 0–100 based on an average of all five judges' scores (From a total of 0 - 500 ÷ 5 judges). In the semi-finals and final, each judge awards each of the riders in the heat a score on a scale of 1–100 points. The rider with the highest score from a single judge wins that judge's vote. The rider who gets three or more judges' votes out of five wins the match-up. The Head Judge is solely responsible for indicating when time expires on a run. If, in the mind of the Head Judge, a rider is considered to be 'on approach' to a jump when the time clock reaches zero, then that jump (or series of jumps in a double-double or 6-pack) is counted in the rider's final score. The Head Judge also has the ability to change any single score or group of scores and makes the final decision in any tiebreaker situations. Should two or more riders in Round one have a scoring tie out of 100 points, then the high and low scores for each rider are eliminated and the remaining three scores averaged to give a score of 100 points. Should this method still result in a tie then the highest single score breaks the tie(s). In the event that none of these methods breaks the tie(s), then the Head Judge breaks the tie(s).

== Venues ==
Overall there have been 25 different locations that have hosted an X-Fighters event. Below is the list of former and current venues, along with their location and the number of times taken part.

Plaza de Toros de Valencia	Las Ventas	Plaza de Toros México	Slane Castle	10th-Anniversary Stadium
Valencia, Spain	Madrid, Spain	Mexico City, Mexico	Slane, Ireland	Warsaw, Poland
II	XV	IX	I	I
Steinbruch Oetelshofen	Fort Worth Stockyards	Sambadrome Marquês de Sapucaí	Battersea Power Station	Stampede Park
Wuppertal, Germany	Texas, United States	Rio de Janeiro, Brazil	London, United Kingdom	Calgary, Canada
I	II	I	II	I
Red Square	Giza Plateau	Stadio Olimpico	Jumeirah Beach	Monumental Axis
Moscow, Russia	Cairo, Egypt	Rome, Italy	Dubai, United Arab Emirates	Brasília, Brazil
I	I	II	II	I
Stadion Miejski	Cockatoo Island	Glen Helen Raceway	Yedikule Fortress	Olympiastadion
Poznań, Poland	Sydney, Australia	California, United States	Istanbul, Turkey	Munich, Germany
I	II	II	0 (revoked permission)	II
Mohammed bin Rashid Boulevard	Osaka Castle	Union Buildings	Dionysos Marble Quarry	Corniche
Dubai, United Arab Emirates	Osaka, Japan	Pretoria, South Africa	Athens, Greece	Abu Dhabi, United Arab Emirates
I	II	III	I	I

== Results and statistics ==
=== Records ===
Record	Rider	T
Most starts	(Spain) Dany Torres	48
Most head to heads	(Spain) Dany Torres	69
Most head to heads won	(Spain) Dany Torres	41
Most head to heads lost	(Spain) Dany Torres	28
Most quarterfinals	(Spain) Dany Torres	33
Most semi-finals	(Spain) Dany Torres	21
Most finals	(New Zealand) Levi Sherwood	12
Most wins	(New Zealand) Levi Sherwood	8
Most top three appearances	(Spain) Dany Torres	20
Most World Tour wins	(United States) Nate Adams	2
Most World Tour top three appearances	(Spain) Dany Torres	7
Total points earned	(Spain) Dany Torres	2340
Most points in a single season	(Switzerland) Mat Rebeaud	465

Dany Torres of Spain is the all-time top points holder on the World Tour, with 7 wins and 1 title. Torres also holds the following records; Most starts, Most head to heads, Most head to heads won, Most head to heads lost, Most quarterfinals, Most semi-finals, Most top three appearances and Most World Tour top three appearances. He is the most successful rider to hold a total of 9 X-Fighters records. New Zealander Levi Sherwood holds two (Most finals and Most wins), with Nate Adams and Mat Rebeaud both holding one each.

=== World Tour champions ===
Year	Rider	P
2007	(United States) Travis Pastrana	250
2008	(Switzerland) Mat Rebeaud	465
2009	(United States) Nate Adams	325
2010	(United States) Nate Adams	370
2011	(Spain) Dany Torres	390
2012	(New Zealand) Levi Sherwood	335
2013	(France) Thomas Pagès	360
2014	(Australia) Josh Sheehan	360
2015	(Australia) Clinton Moore	380
2016	(France) Thomas Pagès	12

In all, 86 top riders have competed in at least one X-Fighters event. Of these, eight riders have won the World Tour. With two titles, American Nate Adams is the most successful World Tour rider. Adams (2009 and 2010) is also the only rider to have won two consecutive titles.

=== Wall of Fame ===
- 1 (United States) Mike Jones
- 2 (United States) Nate Adams
- 3 (United States) Travis Pastrana
- 4 (Switzerland) Mat Rebeaud
- 5 (Australia) Robbie Maddison
- 6 (Spain) Dany Torres
- 7 (New Zealand) Levi Sherwood
- 8 (Japan) Eigo Satō
- 9 (France) Thomas Pagès
- 10 (Australia) Josh Sheehan

Red Bull X-Fighters released their very own Wall of Fame in a video about the history of the competition. There also is a Hall of Fame. There are only 9 Freestyle Motocross riders in the sport's most exclusive club. It is reserved only for the winners of Madrid, the most important FMX stop each year since the inaugural event in 2002. The Hall of Fame in Madrid features plaques hanging on the walls with the names, Spanish nicknames, and portraits of each year's winner, framed in the style of famous bullfighters who have also graced the grounds of the Las Ventas bullring. The Hall of Fame starts with Edgar Torronteras (2002, "E.T."), Kenny Bartram (2003, "El Cowboy"), Travis Pastrana (2004/06/07, "El Prodigioso"), Nate Adams (2005, "El Destroyer"), Mat Rebeaud (2008, "Air Mat"), Dany Torres (2009/11, "El Pajarillo"), Robbie Maddison (2010, "Mad Dog"), Levi Sherwood (2012/17 "El Chico de Goma") and Thomas Pagès (2013/14/15/16, "Mr Flair").

== Race results ==
Location	Venue	Event	Year	(gold) Champion	(silver) Second	(bronze) Third	Riders	Ref.
Valencia	Plaza de Toros de Valencia	I	2001	Mike Jones (USA)	Edgar Torronteras (ESP)	Xavier Fabre (FRA)		
Madrid	Las Ventas	I	2002	Edgar Torronteras (ESP)	Mike Jones (USA)	Mike Metzger (USA)		
Valencia	Plaza de Toros de Valencia	II	2003	Kenny Bartram (USA)	Nate Adams (USA)	Nick Franklin (NZL)		
Madrid	Las Ventas	II	2003	Kenny Bartram (USA)	Nate Adams (USA)	Dayne Kinnaird (AUS)		
Madrid	Las Ventas	III	2004	Travis Pastrana (USA)	Nate Adams (USA)	Ronnie Renner (USA)		
Mexico City	Plaza de Toros México	I	2005	Ronnie Renner (USA)	Jeremy Stenberg (USA)	Kenny Bartram (USA)		
Madrid	Las Ventas	IV	2005	Nate Adams (USA)	Jeremy Stenberg (USA)	Mat Rebeaud (SWI)		
Mexico City	Plaza de Toros México	II	2006	Mat Rebeaud (SWI)	Ronnie Renner (USA)	Travis Pastrana (USA)		
Madrid	Las Ventas	V	2006	Travis Pastrana (USA)	Nate Adams (USA)	Mat Rebeaud (SWI)		
Moscow	Red Square	–	2007	Event cancelled			–	
Madrid	Las Ventas	VI	2007	Travis Pastrana (USA)	Mat Rebeaud (SWI)	Nate Adams (USA)	10	
Dublin	Slane Castle	I	2007	Travis Pastrana (USA)	Mat Rebeaud (SWI)	Dany Torres (ESP)	10	
Mexico City	Plaza de Toros México	III	2007	Dany Torres (ESP)	Nate Adams (USA)	Robbie Maddison (AUS)	10	
Warsaw	10th-Anniversary Stadium	I	2008	Dany Torres (ESP)	Robbie Maddison (AUS)	Mat Rebeaud (SWI)	4	
Wuppertal	Steinbruch Oetelshofen	I	2008	Mat Rebeaud (SWI)	Jeremy Lusk (USA)	Dany Torres (ESP)	10	
Madrid	Las Ventas	VII	2008	Mat Rebeaud (SWI)	André Villa (NOR)	Robbie Maddison (AUS)	10	
Texas	Fort Worth Stockyards	I	2008	Mat Rebeaud (SWI)	Jeremy Stenberg (USA)	Jeremy Lusk (USA)	10	
Rio de Janeiro	Sambadrome Marquês de Sapucaí	I	2008	Jeremy Stenberg (USA)	Mat Rebeaud (SWI)	Robbie Maddison (AUS)	10	
Mexico City	Plaza de Toros México	IV	2008	Mat Rebeaud (SWI)	Dany Torres (ESP)	Jeremy Lusk (USA)	10	
Mexico City	Plaza de Toros México	V	2009	Levi Sherwood (NZL)	Eigo Satō (JPN)	Mat Rebeaud (SWI)	10	
Calgary	Stampede Park	I	2009	Robbie Maddison (AUS)	Eigo Satō (JPN)	Mat Rebeaud (SWI)	10	
Texas	Fort Worth Stockyards	II	2009	Nate Adams (USA)	Mat Rebeaud (SWI)	Cam Sinclair (AUS)	10	
Madrid	Las Ventas	VIII	2009	Dany Torres (ESP)	Nate Adams (USA)	Robbie Maddison (AUS)	10	
London	Battersea Power Station	I	2009	Nate Adams (USA)	Levi Sherwood (NZL)	Dany Torres (ESP)	10	
Mexico City	Plaza de Toros México	VIII	2014	Levi Sherwood (NZL)	Josh Sheehan (AUS)	Dany Torres (ESP)	12	
Osaka	Osaka Castle	II	2014	Levi Sherwood (NZL)	Rémi Bizouard (FRA)	Dany Torres (ESP)	12	
Madrid	Las Ventas	XIII	2014	Thomas Pagès (FRA)	Josh Sheehan (AUS)	Levi Sherwood (NZL)	12	
Munich	Olympiastadion	II	2014	Josh Sheehan (AUS)	Taka Higashino (JPN)	Levi Sherwood (NZL)	12	
Pretoria	Union Buildings	II	2014	Josh Sheehan (AUS)	Dany Torres (ESP)	Adam Jones (USA)	12	
Madrid	Las Ventas	XV	2016	Thomas Pagès (FRA)	Clinton Moore (AUS)	Josh Sheehan (AUS)	12	
Madrid	Las Ventas	XVI	2017	Levi Sherwood (NZL)	Josh Sheehan (AUS)	Taka Higashino (JPN)	12	

=== World Tours ===
2007–2015
Year	#	Mexico City VI	Cairo I	Moscow I	Madrid IX	London II	Rome I
2010	1st place, gold medalist(s)	André Villa (NOR)	Adam Jones (USA)	Levi Sherwood (NZL)	Robbie Maddison (AUS)	Levi Sherwood (NZL)	Dany Torres (ESP)
2010	2nd place, silver medalist(s)	Nate Adams (USA)	André Villa (NOR)	Nate Adams (USA)	Mat Rebeaud (SWI)	Nate Adams (USA)	Adam Jones (USA)
2010	3rd place, bronze medalist(s)	Robbie Maddison (AUS)	Nate Adams (USA)	André Villa (NOR)	André Villa (NOR)	Dany Torres (ESP)	Nate Adams (USA)
		Dubai I	Brasília I	Rome II	Madrid X	Poznań I	Sydney I
2011	1st place, gold medalist(s)	Dany Torres (ESP)	Nate Adams (USA)	Nate Adams (USA)	Dany Torres (ESP)	Nate Adams (USA)	Josh Sheehan (AUS)
2011	2nd place, silver medalist(s)	André Villa (NOR)	Robbie Maddison (AUS)	André Villa (NOR)	Blake Williams (AUS)	Dany Torres (ESP)	Levi Sherwood (NZL)
2011	3rd place, bronze medalist(s)	Nate Adams (USA)	André Villa (NOR)	Josh Sheehan (AUS)	Josh Sheehan (AUS)	Eigo Satō (JPN)	Dany Torres (ESP)
		Dubai II	California I	Madrid XI	Munich I	Sydney II	Istanbul (cancelled)
2012	1st place, gold medalist(s)	Levi Sherwood (NZL)	Todd Potter (USA)	Levi Sherwood (NZL)	Thomas Pagès (FRA)	Levi Sherwood (NZL)	–
2012	2nd place, silver medalist(s)	Rob Adelberg (AUS)	Thomas Pagès (FRA)	Dany Torres (ESP)	Dany Torres (ESP)	Thomas Pagès (FRA)	–
2012	3rd place, bronze medalist(s)	Javier Villegas (CHI)	Wes Agee (USA)	Maikel Melero (ESP)	Eigo Satō (JPN)	Josh Sheehan (AUS)	–
		Mexico City VII	Dubai III	California II	Osaka I	Madrid XII	Pretoria (cancelled)
2013	1st place, gold medalist(s)	Thomas Pagès (FRA)	Dany Torres (ESP)	Rob Adelberg (AUS)	Taka Higashino (JPN)	Thomas Pagès (FRA)	–
2013	2nd place, silver medalist(s)	Dany Torres (ESP)	Levi Sherwood (NZL)	Thomas Pagès (FRA)	Thomas Pagès (FRA)	Taka Higashino (JPN)	–
2013	3rd place, bronze medalist(s)	Levi Sherwood (NZL)	Thomas Pagès (FRA)	Taka Higashino (JPN)	Adam Jones (USA)	Javier Villegas (CHI)	–

== Medal table ==
Rank	Nation	Gold	Silver	Bronze	Total
1	United States (USA)	17	16	13	46
2	Spain (ESP)	8	6	8	22
3	Australia (AUS)	7	6	10	23
4	New Zealand (NZL)	7	3	5	15
5	Switzerland (SUI)	5	5	5	15
6	France (FRA)	3	5	1	9
7	Japan (JPN)	1	4	3	8
Totals (7 entries)		48	45	45	138
