= Kenny Bartram =

American motocross rider

Personal information
- Nickname: The Cowboy
- Born: August 23, 1978 (age 48) Stillwater, Oklahoma, U.S.
- Height: 6 ft 0 in (183 cm)
- Weight: 166 lb (75 kg)

Sport
- Sport: Freestyle motocross (FMX)
- Events: X Games, Gravity Games, Dew Tour, Red Bull X-Fighters
Medal record
Summer X Games
Representing United States
Gold medal – first place	2001 Philadelphia	Moto X Big Air
Silver medal – second place	2002 Philadelphia	Moto X Freestyle
Silver medal – second place	2005 Los Angeles	Moto X Freestyle
Bronze medal – third place	2003 Los Angeles	Moto X Big Air
Gravity Games
Gold medal – first place	1999 Providence	Moto X Freestyle Team
Bronze medal – third place	2000 Providence	Moto X Freestyle
Bronze medal – third place	2002 Cleveland	Moto X Freestyle

Kenny Bartram (born August 23, 1978) is an American professional freestyle motocross rider (FMX). Bartram is from Stillwater, Oklahoma, and is nicknamed "The Cowboy." Bartram usually wears orange in competition reflecting the colors of nearby Oklahoma State University. Before his career in FMX, he won many Oklahoma State Series MX Races. Out of all other riders, he currently has the most wins with 57 in all. Bartam has also suffered plenty of injuries, including 22 broken bones, 7 knocked out teeth, a steel plate in the jaw, and a damaged blood vessel in the brain. Bartram is contracted with KTM.

== Early life ==
Bartram was born in Stillwater, Oklahoma on August 23, 1978.

== Career ==
From 1996 to 2000, Bartram has competed in the 125 Class of Supercross, and he also been riding Suzuki, KTM and Yamaha dirt bikes. Bartram's favorite music is Country music, and also he is a professional Supercrosser, a Motocross rider and an icon. In 1999, at the Gravity Games I, in Providence, Rhode Island, Bartram along with his best friend Travis Pastrana, performed together in the Moto X Freestyle Team. They won their first ever Gravity Games Gold medal together.

At the 2000 X Games (X Games VI), in San Francisco, California, Bartram made his first X Games appearance in Moto X Freestyle. He finished in 15th, and did not qualify for the Freestyle finals. At the 2000 Gravity Games, Bartram qualified in fourth from the Moto X Freestyle. He would go on to finish in third place, thereby winning his first ever Gravity Games Bronze medal while riding the Yamaha YZ125.

At the 2001 Winter X Games V, in Mount Snow, Vermont, Bartram competed in the debut of Moto X Big Air event on snow while riding the Yamaha YZ250F. He finished fifth on his debut in the event. In May 2001, Bartram switched from the 125 dirt bikes to the KTM 250 SX two-stroke, which is a heavy dirt bike. At the 2001 X Games (X Games VII), Bartram performed a "Shaolin to Sterlizer" and finished first. As a result, he won his first ever Moto X Big Air event and also won an X Games Gold medal. At the 2001 Gravity Games, Bartram qualified in second in Moto X Freestyle prelims, but only finished seventh in the Moto X Freestyle finals.

At the 2002 Winter X Games VI, in Aspen, Colorado, Bartram has the silliest beard ever, but he failed to repeat his 2001 Summer X Games Moto X Big Air Gold medal, and he finished sixth in the Moto X Big Air event. In the 2002 Gravity Games in Cleveland, Ohio, he qualified in 3rd from the Moto X Freestyle prelims, and in the finals, Bartram finished in third place, and took home his second Gravity Games Bronze medal in the Moto X Freestyle event. At the 2002 X Games (X Games VIII), Bartram qualified in second from the Moto X Freestyle prelims, yet in the finals of Moto X Freestyle, Bartram tried to pull off the "Backflip" off of a dirt kicker and broke his ankle. Still, he finished in second in the Moto X Freestyle finals and won the Silver medal.

After fully recovering from his ankle injury from X Games VIII, at the 2003 X Games Global Championship, Bartram along with his teammate Nate Adams performed "Backflips" and won the Gold medal in Moto X Freestyle for Team USA.

At the 2003 X Games (X Games IX), Bartram made his Moto X Step Up debut, and finished seventh in the event. In the Moto X Freestyle prelims, Bartram qualified in third and finished in fourth in the Moto X Freestyle finals. He made a comeback in the Moto X Big Air, performing the "Backflip Heelclicker" and finished in third thereby winning his second Moto X Big Air medal, the Bronze medal.

At the 2004 X Games (X Games X), Bartram competed in three events. He finished tenth in Moto X Best Trick and sixth in Moto X Freestyle. He did not qualify for the Freestyle finals; he also finished 11th in the Supermoto event.

At the 2005 X Games (X Games XI), Bartram performed a "Side Saddle Take-Off Backflip" and finished in fourth in Moto X Best Trick. In Moto X Freestyle, he qualified in fifth from the Moto X Freestyle prelims. In the finals, he finished second after pulling off the same trick and winning his second X Games Silver medal in Moto X Freestyle.

At the 2006 Winter X Games X, Bartram finished in eighth in Moto X Best Trick, and he did not qualify for the finals.

At X Games XII on Friday morning, while on a practice run, Bartram suffering a fractured wrist and broken clavicle.

Bartram is also a part of Travis Pastranas' Nitro Circus.

== Other appearances ==
Bartram features as a playable character in the video game, Crusty Demons, released on PS2 and Xbox. He is also featured in the 2003 video game MTX Mototrax: Nitro Circus Rally Car Racing.

== Events ==
- 2002 WFA Cleveland, OH - Freestyle: 1st
- 2003 Red Bull X-Fighters - Freestyle: 1st (Valencia, Spain)
- 2003 Red Bull X-Fighters - Freestyle: 1st (Madrid, Spain)
- 2005 Red Bull X-Fighters - Freestyle: 3rd (Mexico City, Mexico)
- 7 World Championships
- Rally America Rookie of the year, and 2 Rally America National Championships
- 2 time WFA and IFMA Champion, VTC Champion

== X Games competition history ==
GOLD (1) SILVER (2) BRONZE (1)
YEAR	X GAMES	EVENTS	RANK	MEDAL
2000	Summer X Games VI	Moto X Freestyle	15th	
2001	Winter X Games V	Moto X Big Air	5th	
2001	Summer X Games VII	Moto X Big Air	1st	Gold medal
2002	Winter X Games VI	Moto X Big Air	6th	
2002	Summer X Games VIII	Moto X Freestyle	2nd	Silver medal
2003	Winter X Games VII	Moto X Big Air	5th	
2003	Summer X Games IX	Moto X Step Up	7th	
2003	Summer X Games IX	Moto X Freestyle	4th	
2003	Summer X Games IX	Moto X Big Air	3rd	Bronze medal
2004	Summer X Games X	Moto X Best Trick	10th	
2004	Summer X Games X	Moto X Freestyle	6th	
2004	Summer X Games X	MTX Supermoto	11th	
2005	Summer X Games XI	Moto X Best Trick	4th	
2005	Summer X Games XI	Moto X Freestyle	2nd	Silver medal
2006	Winter X Games X	Moto X Best Trick	8th	

== Gravity Games ==
YEAR	GRAVITY GAMES	LOCATION	EVENTS	RANK	MEDAL
1999	Gravity Games I	Providence, RI	MTX Freestyle Team	1st	Gold medal
2000	Gravity Games II	Providence, RI	MTX Freestyle	3rd	Bronze medal
2001	Gravity Games III	Providence, RI	MTX Freestyle	7th	
2002	Gravity Games IV	Cleveland, OH	MTX Freestyle	3rd	Bronze medal
