= X Games XVIII =

2012 sports event in Los Angeles, California

X Games Los Angeles 2012
- Venue: Nokia Theatre; Staples Center; L.A. Live
- Location: Los Angeles, California
- Date: June 28-July 1

X Games XVIII (re-titled X Games Los Angeles 2012) was an action sporting event which took place from June 28 – July 1, 2012 in Los Angeles, California. Venues for the event included the Staples Center, Nokia Theatre and the streets near L.A. Live. The games featured the sports of Moto X, skateboarding, BMX, and Rallycross. Last year's X Games 17 was the first ever X Games to feature Enduro X, which replaced Super X. In 2013, the Summer X Games will be held in four international cities in Foz do Iguaçu, Brazil (April 18–21, 2013); Barcelona, Spain (May 9–12, 2013); Munich, Germany (June 27–30, 2013); and Los Angeles, California (August 1–4, 2013).

The event was also held during the weekend of the 2012 Anime Expo which took place at the nearby Los Angeles Convention Center.

== Results ==
=== Moto X ===
Event	Gold		Silver		Bronze	
Men's Moto X Enduro	Mike Brown (USA)	506.25	Cody Webb (USA)	510.88	Cory Graffunder (CAN)	511.68
Women's Moto X Enduro	Maria Forsberg (USA)	416.51	Louise Forsley (USA)	432.06	Chantelle Bykerk (CAN)	446.19
Women's Moto X Racing	Vicki Golden (USA)	300.8	Tarah Gieger (PUR)	308.0	Livia Lancelot (FRA)	310.0
Moto X Freestyle	Taka Higashino (JPN)	93.33	Levi Sherwood (NZL)	91.66	Javier Villegas (CHL)	88.66
Moto X Step Up	Ronnie Renner (USA)	47'0"	Matt Buyten (USA)	46'0"	Brian Deegan (USA)	39'0"
Moto X Best Whip*	Jeremy Stenberg (USA)	32%	Jarryd McNeil (AUS)	19%	Todd Potter (USA)	17%
Moto X Best Trick	Jackson Strong (AUS)	91.00	Taka Higashino (JPN)	90.33	Cam Sinclair (AUS)	89.33
Moto X Speed & Style	Mike Mason (USA)	92.8	Nate Adams (USA)	91.3	Ronnie Faisst (USA)	

* Competition decided by fan text message voting.

=== Skateboard ===
Event	Gold		Silver		Bronze	
Skateboard Big Air	Bob Burnquist (BRA)	94.33	Mitchie Brusco (USA)	93.00	Nolan Munroe (USA)	91.00
Skateboard Vert	Pierre-Luc Gagnon (CAN)	91.00	Bucky Lasek (USA)	91.00	Andy Macdonald (USA)	85.66
Skateboard Street	Paul Rodriguez (USA)	86.00	Ryan Sheckler (USA)	85.33	Nyjah Huston (USA)	85.00
Women's Skateboard Street	Alexis Sablone (USA)	85.66	Leticia Bufoni (BRA)	81.00	Rachel Reinhard (USA)	80.33
Skateboard Park	Pedro Barros (BRA)	84.0	Ben Hatchell (USA)	83.0	Rune Glifberg (DEN)	78.0
Hometown Heroes Amateur Skateboard Street						
Skateboard Game of SK8	Ryan Decenzo (CAN)	SK–	Ishod Wair (USA)	SK8	Aaron Homoki (USA)	SK8

=== BMX ===
Event	Gold		Silver		Bronze	
BMX Freestyle Vert	Jamie Bestwick (GBR)	86.0	Vince Byron (AUS)	72.0	Simon Tabron (GBR)	72.0
BMX Freestyle Park	Scotty Cranmer (USA)	79.0	Ryan Nyquist (USA)	77.0	Pat Casey (USA)	76.0
BMX Freestyle Big Air	Steve McCann (AUS)	92.33	Zack Warden (USA)	92.0	Kevin Robinson (USA)	91.0
BMX Freestyle Street	Garrett Reynolds (USA)	85.0	Chad Kerley (USA)	83.0	Dakota Roche (USA)	69.0

=== Rally ===
Event	Gold		Silver		Bronze	
Rallycross	Sébastien Loeb (FRA)	272.58	Ken Block (USA)	284.81	Brian Deegan (USA)	285.23

== Medal table ==
Rank	Nation	Gold	Silver	Bronze	Total
1	United States (USA)	9	13	10	32
2	Australia (AUS)	2	1	1	4
3	Brazil (BRA)	2	1	0	3
4	Canada (CAN)	2	0	2	4
5	Japan (JPN)	1	1	0	2
6	France (FRA)	1	0	1	2
6	Great Britain (GBR)	1	0	1	2
8	New Zealand (NZL)	0	1	0	1
8	Puerto Rico (PUR)	0	1	0	1
10	Chile (CHL)	0	0	1	1
10	Denmark (DEN)	0	0	1	1
Totals (11 entries)		18	18	17	53

== Highlights ==
- Linkin Park performed on Friday night, June 29, and launched the X Games MUSIC.
- Bob Burnquist won his fourth Big Air gold medal, and his ninth total medals during his participation in all 18 X Games.
- Tanner Foust and Greg Tracy performed a double loop in the Hot Wheels Challenge; the first in X Games history.
