= Chris McLennan =

New Zealand photographer

Chris McLennan (born 18 January, 1964) is a New Zealand travel photographer who achieved worldwide recognition following the release of his "Car-L meets the lions" video. The video became a viral hit with over 7 million YouTube views and was featured in national publications and on TV news stations around the globe. (Including CNN & Huffington Post in the US, Metro.co.uk in the United Kingdom, German T Online in Germany, Global News in Canada, FotoOutlet in Hungary, Information Telegraph Agency in Russia, Expressen TV in Sweden, RTVE Breakfast TV in Spain, Argentina TV, Belgium TV, Zoomin Italian TV and News agency in Italy and African Geographic in Africa, as well as live interviews on TV3's Campbell Live and TV1's Seven Sharp news programs in McLennan's home country of New Zealand).

== Early life ==
Chris McLennan was born on 18 January, 1964, in Gore, New Zealand. He grew up in the small farming community of Riversdale in the South Island and attended Gore High School. He had an early interest in photography and through his teenage years took regular photos of his father's classic car racing.

== Career ==
The middle of five children, McLennan originally trained and worked as a butcher before taking up photography as a serious profession in 1988 when he purchased an existing wedding and portrait studio operating out of Invercargill. He re-branded the company as "Chris McLennan Photography Ltd" and moved to Queenstown where he worked as a freelance photographer. He focused on the adventure tourism industry and by the early to mid-1990s was established as a self-employed professional photographer working for clients both in New Zealand and also offshore.

McLennan first gained critical international acclaim when he was recognised with a PDN National Geographic Traveler award in 2009 for his image "Lost World". This was followed by the same award the following year for his image "Freestyle Moto-X", where he mounted a DSLR camera to the handlebars of well-known stunt rider Levi Sherwood's bike. He became an "EOS Master Photographer" for camera brand Canon in 2010 before changing to Nikon in late 2012. He is currently an Ambassador for Nikon and also holds international endorsement relationships with industry brands Lowepro and Lexar

His reputation for colour accuracy resulted in the formation of a formal relationship with computing brand Hewlett-Packard for whom he is an international Ambassador - in particular representing their colour accurate DreamColor products

=== Photographic Work ===
McLennan's body of photographic work predominantly covers travel imagery from around the world, encompassing wildlife, culture, landscapes, seascapes and cityscapes. He has worked on commercial assignments in over 45 different countries and is known for his technical excellence, unusual angles and the colour and clarity of his photos.

=== Past exhibitions ===
- Colours of our World Exhibition, Napier July 2013
- A Year in the Wild Life of Chris McLennan, Auckland June 2013
- (Auckland Festival of Photograph) Kumeu Art Centre Exhibition, Auckland July 2012
- (Auckland Festival of Photography) Apix Exhibition, Auckland July 2011
- Jack's Point Exhibition, Queenstown August 2010

== International Awards List ==
- 2021 New Zealand Geographic Photographer of the Year 2021 - Lightforce Aerial - Highly Commended
- 2014 Photography Masters Cup International Color Awards - 7 nominations
- 2013 International Black and White Spider Awards - 10 nominations, 2 Honors awards
- 2013 Photography Masters Cup International Color Awards - 8 nominations, 1 Honors award
- 2012 World Open of Photography - 2 finalist images
- 2012 Travel Photographer of the Year - 2 portfolio and 3 individual image finalists, best single image in a portfolio
- 2012 International Black and White Spider Awards - 3 nominations, 1 Honors award
- 2012 Photography Masters Cup International Color Awards - 3 nominations, 1 Honors award
- 2012 World Open of Photography, 2 finalist images
- 2012 PDN International Photography Awards - Category winner "Scenics of the Natural World"
- 2011 Travel Photographer of the Year Awards - Highly Commended portfolio and 5 individual image finalists
- 2011 International Black and White Spider Awards - 2 nominations
- 2011 Photography Masters Cup International Color Awards - 5 nominations, 1 Honors award
- 2011 Victoria Print Awards of Australia, Gold
- 2011 PDN National Geographic Traveler - Finalist
- 2010 PDN National Geographic Traveler - Winner Outdoor Sports Image of the Year, People's Choice award and finalist award
- 2010 International Black and White Spider Awards - 1 Honors Award
- 2010 Photography Masters Cup International Color Awards - 5 nominations
- 2009 PDN National Geographic Traveler - Winner Outdoor Sports Image of the year

== In the media ==
In New Zealand McLennan has featured in the NZ Herald national newspaper, Canvas Magazine (cover story), D-Photo Magazine, Southland Times newspaper (cover story), Rodney Times newspaper (cover story) and NorWest News (cover story), as well as live interviews live on TV3's Campbell Live, TV1's Seven Sharp news programs and a featurette on the Natural History channel. He is author of the regular "On Location" column in D-Photo Magazine, a bi-monthly photographic publication in New Zealand.

Internationally McLennan has been interviewed live on Sky Sports Radio in Australia as well as numerous mentions in international media as a result of his "Car-L meets the lions" YouTube viral video.
