= Mad Mike =

Mad Mike may refer to:

== As a nickname ==
- Mike Banks (musician), American musician and record label co-founder
- Mike Calvert (1913–1998), British Army lieutenant-colonel
- Mad Mike Hoare (1919–2020), British mercenary leader
- Mike Hughes (daredevil) (c. 1955–2020), American stuntman, flat Earth conspiracy theorist, and hobby rocket pilot
- Mike Jones (motocross rider) (born 1966), American freestyle motocross competitor
- Mike Milbury (born 1952), American sportscaster and former National Hockey League player, coach and general manager
- "Mad" Mike Whiddett (born 1981), New Zealand drifting racer

== Other uses ==
- a pen name of Michael Z. Williamson (born 1967), science fiction and military fiction author
- one of the villains in Power Rangers Turbo, a television series
