= Kevin Kowalski (skateboarder) =

American skateboarder (born 1992)

Personal information
- Nationality: American
- Born: March 27, 1992 (age 32)
- Home town: Seal Rock, Oregon

Sport
- Sport: Skateboarding

Kevin Kowalski (born March 27, 1992) is a professional skateboarder from Seal Rock, Oregon in the United States. He won the bronze medal in X Games 16 in skateboard park on August 1, 2010 and finished 2nd in bowl in the 2009 World Cup of Skateboarding.
