= X Games Los Angeles 2013 =

Action sporting event

- Venue: Staples Center; Irwindale Event Center; L.A. Live
- Location: Los Angeles, California; Irwindale, California
- Date: August 1–4

The X Games Los Angeles 2013 was an action sporting event which took place from August 1–4, 2013 in Los Angeles, California, United States. Venues for the event included the Staples Center, Irwindale Event Center, and the streets near L.A. Live. It was the first year that events were held in Irwindale.

It was the fourth and last Summer X Games held in 2013, after events in Foz do Iguaçu, Brazil (April 18–21); Barcelona, Spain (May 9–12); and Munich, Germany (June 27–30).

It was the last year for Los Angeles to host the X Games, with Austin, Texas replacing the event in 2014.

== Event locations ==
Venue locations for each sport disciplines for X Games Los Angeles:

=== Staples Center ===
- Moto X Best Whip
- Moto X Enduro X (Men’s & Women’s)
- Moto X Freestyle
- Moto X Racing (Men’s, Women’s & Adaptive)
- Moto X Speed & Style
- Moto X Step Up

=== Event Deck at L.A. Live ===
- BMX Freestyle Street
- Street League Skateboarding
- Skateboard SLS Select Series
- Skateboard Street Women’s
- Skateboard Vert

=== Irwindale Event Center ===
- Ford RallyCross
- Ford Gymkhana Grid
- GoPro BMX Freestyle Big Air
- America’s Navy Skateboard Big Air

== Results ==
=== Moto X ===
Event	Gold		Silver		Bronze	
Men's Moto X Enduro	Tadeusz Błażusiak (POL)	7:55.393	Mike Brown (USA)	7:59.137	Cody Webb (USA)	8:02.191
Women's Moto X Enduro	Laia Sanz (ESP)	5:10.410	Maria Forsberg (USA)	5:47.608	Tarah Gieger (PUR)	6:02.599
Men's Moto X Racing	Justin Brayton (USA)	7:59.950	Josh Hill (USA)	8:01.115	Chris Blose (USA)	8:02.028
Women's Moto X Racing	Vicki Golden (USA)	5:22.442	Meghan Rutledge (AUS)	5:23.231	Kiara Fontanesi (ITA)	5:23.649
Moto X Adaptive Racing	Chris Ridgway (USA)	0:24.786	Mike Schultz (USA)	0:25.453	Todd Thompson (USA)	0:26.486
Moto X Freestyle	Taka Higashino (JPN)	90.00	Adam Jones (USA)	82.66	Nate Adams (USA)	86.33
Moto X Step Up	Ronnie Renner (USA)	38.60	Libor Podmol (CZE)	37.60	Matt Buyten (USA)	36.00
Moto X Best Whip*	Josh Hansen (USA)	42.00%	Jeremy Stenberg (USA)	24.00%	Vicki Golden (USA)	21.00%
Moto X Speed & Style	Nate Adams (USA)	114.251	Blake Williams (AUS)	85.00	Andre Villa (NOR)	90.92

* Competition decided by fan voting via Twitter.

=== Skateboarding ===
Event	Gold		Silver		Bronze	
Skateboard Big Air	Elliot Sloan (USA)	90.165	Tom Schaar (USA)	88.83	Bob Burnquist (BRA)	88.665
Skateboard Freestyle Vert	Bucky Lasek (USA)	92.33	Pierre-Luc Gagnon (CAN)	90.33	Andy Macdonald (USA)	87.00
Skateboard Phenom Street	Tyson Bowerbank (USA)	86.66	Ben Sauer (USA)	85.33	Jonathan Cosentino (CAN)	83.66
Women's Skateboard Street	Leticia Bufoni (BRA)	88.00	Leo Baker (USA)	86.00	Marisa Dal Santo (USA)	81.00
Street League Skateboarding	Nyjah Huston (USA)	53.00	Chris Cole (USA)	44.60	Luan Oliveira (BRA)	44.20
SLS Select Series	Ryan Decenzo (CAN)	41.60	Felipe Gustavo (BRA)	40.80	Greg Lutzka (USA)	40.20

=== BMX ===
Event	Gold		Silver		Bronze	
BMX Freestyle Street	Chad Kerley (USA)	87.00	Garrett Reynolds (USA)	86.00	Jeremiah Smith (USA)	80.00
BMX Freestyle Big Air	Liam Dibson (USA)	91.66	Vince Byron (AUS)	91.33	Zack Warden (USA)	89.66
BMX Phenom Street	Felix Prangenberg (GER)	71.00	Brandon Webster (CAN)	68.00	Grant Germain (USA)	68.00

=== Rallying ===
Event	Gold		Silver		Bronze	
Ford RallyCross	Toomas Heikkinen (FIN)	6:15.573	Tanner Foust (USA)	6:19.678	Sverre Isachsen (NOR)	6:25.002
RallyCross Lites	Joni Wiman (FIN)	6:50.078	Mitchell DeJong (USA)	6:54.968	Sebastian Eriksson (SWE)	6:57.618
Ford Gymkhana Grid	Tanner Foust (USA)		Patrik Sandell (SWE)		Liam Doran (GBR)	

=== Medal table ===
Rank	Nation	Gold	Silver	Bronze	Total
1	United States	13	13	12	38
2	Finland	2	0	0	2
3	Canada	1	2	0	3
4	Brazil	1	1	2	4
5	Germany	1	0	0	1
5	Japan	1	0	0	1
5	Poland	1	0	0	1
5	Spain	1	0	0	1
9	Australia	0	3	0	3
10	Sweden	0	1	1	2
11	Czech Republic	0	1	0	1
12	Norway	0	0	2	2
13	Great Britain	0	0	1	1
13	Italy	0	0	1	1
13	Puerto Rico	0	0	1	1
Totals (15 entries)		21	21	20	62
