= Taka Higashino =

Japanese motorcycle racer

Takayuki Higashino
Personal information
- Nickname: Taka
- Nationality: Japanese
- Born: 13 March 1985 (age 41) Osaka, Japan
- Occupation: Freestyle motocross rider
- Years active: 2003-present

Sport
- Country: Japan
- Sport: Motocross; Freestyle motocross
- Events: X Games; Red Bull X-Fighters; Nitro Circus; Dew Tour
Medal record
Representing Japan
Competition
Gold medal – first place	X Games Los Angeles 2013	Moto X Freestyle
Gold medal – first place	X Games Foz do Iguaçu 2013	Moto X Freestyle
Gold medal – first place	X Games Los Angeles 2012	Moto X Freestyle
Silver medal – second place	X Games Los Angeles 2012	Moto X Best Trick
Bronze medal – third place	X Games Chiba 2024	Moto X Best Trick
Bronze medal – third place	Nitro World Games 2016	FMX
Bronze medal – third place	X Games Los Angeles 2010	Moto X Best Trick
- Updated on 13 August 2018

Takayuki "Taka" Higashino (東野 貴行, Higashino Takayuki; born 13 March 1985) is a Japanese freestyle motocross rider who has competed in international events including the X-Games, being the first Asian gold medalist in the X-Games. He has three X-Games Gold Medals in Freestyle Moto. The only other rider to win more than three Golds in FMX along with Travis Pastrana. A pioneer for the growth of the sport, he is known for inventing the body varial trick the “California Roll/Cali Roll” or sometimes nicknamed the “Taka Roll” which is a slightly different version of the Special Flip.

Higashino began riding motocross when he was seven, and attended many races during his teens. He turned professional at the age of 18, and moved to the United States in 2006 to compete. He appeared in his first X Games contest in 2007. His motocross career took off in 2010, when he finished first at the Dew Tour Salt Lake City FMX Contest, Red Bull XRAY, and earned a bronze medal for his FMX Best Trick performance at X Games XVI. That year, Transworld Motocross named Higashino the Breakout FMX Rider of the Year.

In 2011, Higashino took first place at the ASA World Championships of FMX and competed in his fifth consecutive X Games competition. He also performed on the Nuclear Cowboyz Freestyle Chaos tour, an American motocross exhibition, and will ride on the tour again in 2012. At X Games XVIII in 2012, he won gold in Moto X Freestyle and claimed second in Moto X Best Trick.

== Career highlights ==
Winner, 2013 Red Bull X-Fighters Osaka, FMX
Gold, X Games Los Angeles 2013 Moto X Freestyle
Gold, X Games Foz do Iguaçu 2013, Moto X Freestyle
Gold, 2012 X Games Los Angeles 2012, Moto X Freestyle
Winner, 2011 ASA World Championships of FMX
Winner, 2010 Dew Tour Salt Lake City FMX Contest
Winner, 2010 Red Bull XRAY
Silver, 2012 X Games, FMX Best Trick
Bronze, 2010 X Games, FMX Best Trick
