= Clinton Moore =

Australian motorcycle racer

Personal information
- Nationality: Australian
- Born: 24 April 1988 (age 38) Bundaberg, Queensland, Australia

Clinton Moore (born 24 April 1988 in Bundaberg, Queensland) is a freestyle motocross rider from Australia. He is the current Red Bull X Fighters World Tour Champion winning the last event of the year in Abu Dhabi.

== Personal life and career ==
Moore first started riding a dirt bike when he was a little kid, using the acres around the farm to develop his bike skills. This was when he realized he wanted to grow up to be a FMX rider. Moore originally got into the sport when his older sister's boyfriend lent him tapes of Freestyle Motocross riders. Moore participated in X-Games 2010 in freestyle where he finished in fourth place. Moore also made his Red Bull X-Fighters debut that year in London where he finished in dead last at eighth place. In 2015 Moore made his first career win in Red Bull X Fighters where he won against Levi Sherwood 3-2 in the finals in Mexico City.
