= Mike Jones (motocross rider) =

American motorcycle racer

Personal information
- Full name: Michael Jones
- Nickname: "Mad" Mike Jones
- Born: February 28, 1966 (age 60) Pittsburgh, Pennsylvania, U.S.
- Height: 5 ft 11 in (180 cm)
- Weight: 182 lb (83 kg)
- Spouse: Christine Jones
- Children: 1

Sport
- Sport: Freestyle motocross (FMX), Freeride Mountain biking
- Events: X Games, Gravity Games, Red Bull X-Fighters
Medal record
Winter X Games
Representing United States
Gold medal – first place	2001 Vermont	Moto X Big Air
Silver medal – second place	2002 Aspen	Moto X Big Air

Michael Jones (born February 28, 1966) is an American freestyle motocross competitor with over 35 years of professional rider experience. He started his motorcycle racing career in 1972 aged six. Continuing to race up until his last Fastcross in Italy 2000, he became increasingly involved in the emerging sport of Freestyle Motocross, performing half-time jump shows at football games as early as 1987. He is attributed as being "one of the founding fathers of the sport of freestyle motocross" and became known as "Mad" Mike Jones after an Italian promoter described his stunts as "Mad" and "the name stuck". He has appeared in numerous movies, including Crusty Demons and Eight Legged Freaks, and also goes around North American schools to share about his experience.

== Early life ==
Jones was born in Pittsburgh, Pennsylvania on February 28, 1966.

== Career ==
"Mad" Mike is the 1998 World Freestyle Motocross Champion. In 2001, he was the first ever to win the Red Bull X-Fighters competition. "Mad" Mike is the 4 time German Supercross Champion.

Jones is attributed to being co-inventor of the trick "Kiss of Death" along with Ryan Leyba. The trick was developed by the two riders at Manny's yard in Elsinore. He went on to use this trick at Winter X Games Vermont, where Jones achieved a gold medal. He also claims in an interview that he invented the "Coffin", the no-handed landing, and various trick combinations including "Kiss of death Indian" and "Heel Clicker Nothing".

== Media appearances ==
- Disturbing the Peace (1997)
- Children of a Metal God Trilogy (1998)
- Surviving Extreme Sports (2001)
- MX Superfly (2002)
- Global Addiction (2002)
- Freekstyle (2002)
- Crusty Demons 8 (2003)
- Freestyle MetalX (2003)
- Ski to the Max (2004)
- Mad Mikes Mayhem (2005)
- Fall Out 2 (2006)
- Crusty Demons XII: Dirty Dozen (2006)
- MotoXmania (2008)
- Mythbusters: Sharkus Maximus (2011)

== Career results ==
=== X Games ===
GOLD (1) SILVER (1) BRONZE (0)
YEAR	X GAMES	EVENTS	RANK	MEDAL
1999	Summer X Games V	Moto X Freestyle	4th	
2000	Summer X Games VI	Moto X Step Up	5th	
2000	Summer X Games VI	Moto X Freestyle	5th	
2001	Winter X Games V	Moto X Big Air	1st	Gold medal
2001	Summer X Games VII	Moto X Freestyle	5th	
2001	Summer X Games VII	Moto X Step Up	12th	
2001	Summer X Games VII	Moto X Big Air	4th	
2002	Winter X Games VI	Moto X Big Air	2nd	Silver medal
2002	Summer X Games VIII	Moto X Freestyle		
2002	Summer X Games VIII	Moto X Big Air	10th	
2003	Summer X Games IX	Moto X Big Air	12th	

=== Gravity Games ===
YEAR	GRAVITY GAMES	LOCATION	EVENTS	RANK	MEDAL
2000	Gravity Games II	Providence, RI	MTX Freestyle	7th	
2001	Gravity Games III	Providence, RI	MTX Freestyle	10th	

=== Other events ===
- 1999 Vans Triple Crown of Freestyle Motocross: 3rd
- 2000 Australian X Games - Freestyle: 1st
- 2001 Red Bull X-Fighters - Freestyle: 1st (Valencia, Spain)
- 2002 Red Bull X-Fighters - Freestyle: 2nd (Madrid, Spain)
