= Levi Sherwood =

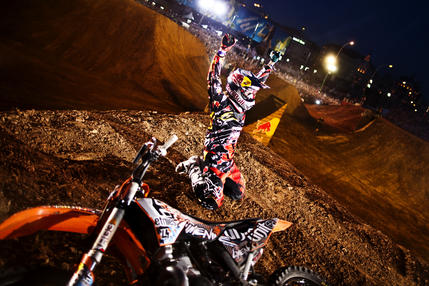
- Red Bull X-Fighters World Series, 2010

Personal information
- Nickname: Rubber Kid
- Nationality: New Zealand
- Born: 22 October 1991 (age 34) Palmerston North, New Zealand
- Education: Palmerston North Boys' High School
- Occupation: Freestyle motocross rider
- Years active: 2002-2020
- Other interests: BMX, golf, remote control cars, snowboarding

Sport
- Country: New Zealand
- Sport: Motocross; Freestyle motocross
- Events: Crusty Demons; X Games; Red Bull X-Fighters; Nitro Circus
Medal record
Summer X Games
Representing New Zealand
Gold medal – first place	2017 Minneapolis	Moto X Best Trick
Gold medal – first place	2017 Minneapolis	Moto X Freestyle
Silver medal – second place	2010 Los Angeles	Moto X Freestyle
Silver medal – second place	2012 Los Angeles	Moto X Freestyle
Silver medal – second place	2015 Austin	Moto X QuarterPipe
Nitro World Games
Gold medal – first place	2016 Salt Lake City	FMX
Gold medal – first place	2017 Salt Lake City	FMX
- Updated on 19 July 2017

Levi Sherwood (born 22 October 1991) is a retired freestyle motocross rider from New Zealand, nicknamed "rubber kid".

== Early life ==
Sherwood was born in Palmerston North, New Zealand, attending Palmerston North Boys' High School. Starting out in motocross racing, he followed in the footsteps of his father Dave Sherwood, who was a professional speedway racer. Sherwood's love for speed and adrenaline translated into his move to freestyle motocross. He started riding motorbikes at the age of four. At 12 years old, he was invited to ride on the Crusty Demons Australasian tour, giving him a taste of professional freestyle.

== Career ==
=== 2009 ===
In March, Sherwood was in the United States negotiating a sponsorship deal with Red Bull when a rider withdrew from the X-Fighters series, backed by the drinks company. He was offered the unexpected chance to fill in. At age 17, Sherwood competed in his first professional event and clinically beat the best riders in the world in front of 42,000, winning the opening round of the Red Bull X-Fighters in Mexico. He rode a KX450F, the only four-stroke that had ever been seen in at the huge competition. He qualified fourth and had arguably the hardest run to the finals. In the quarterfinals he beat Norwegian legend André Villa, then shocked the world when he closed out 2008 defending champion Mat Rebeaud in the semifinals. Sherwood then met Japan's Eigo Sato in the finals, but Sato was simply no match.

A starting place for the following Red Bull X-Fighters event in Canada followed. Despite not being able to repeat his debut win, Sherwood established himself as one of the top riders on the Red Bull X-Fighters World Tour 2009 with solid performances and including another podium finish, coming second in England.

=== 2010 ===
Sherwood won silver in the Moto X Freestyle final of the X Games XVI in Los Angeles. The field started with sixteen riders and carved back to the top four point scorers for three run final. Sherwood at the age of just 18 and the only New Zealander at the games, finished with 79 points from the best two scores of three rides, one point behind Travis Pastrana of the United States. Pastrana had locked up the gold before his final run when Sherwood was unable to catch up with his third round.

Sherwood's sixth place in the overall standings in 2009 got him qualified for the 2010 season, and Sherwood was one of the five guys to battle for the title that year. Everything seemed to work in Sherwood's favor with a win in Moscow, and another victory in London, but then he crashed badly at the ASA World Championships of FMX in Pomona, California. He found himself with a dislocated wrist and badly broken femur. The injuries forced him out of the final battle in Italy and Sherwood watched the Red Bull X-Fighters World Tour finale on television.

Later that year, it was confirmed that Sherwood would ride alongside FMX legend Travis Pastrana and the entire Nitro Circus crew for their huge one night only show at North Harbour Stadium on February 5, 2011. Thus being Sherwood's first ever Nitro Circus Live performances.

== Statistics ==
=== Red Bull X-Fighters World Tour ===
World Tour	Entrant	Moto	1	2	3	4	5	6	Points	Place
2016	KTM	KTM; 250SX	(Spain)	X	X	X	X	X	–	–
2016	KTM	KTM; 250SX	4	X	X	X	X	X	–	–
2015	KTM	KTM; 250SX	(Mexico)	(Greece)	(Spain)	(South Africa)	(United Arab Emirates)	X	185	5th
2015	KTM	KTM; 250SX	2nd place, silver medalist(s)	8	2nd place, silver medalist(s)	--	--	X	185	5th
2014	KTM	KTM; 250SX	(Mexico)	(Japan)	(Spain)	(Germany)	(South Africa)	X	270	2nd
2014	KTM	KTM; 250SX	1st place, gold medalist(s)	1st place, gold medalist(s)	3rd place, bronze medalist(s)	3rd place, bronze medalist(s)	--	X	270	2nd
2013	KTM	KTM; 250SX	(Mexico)	(United Arab Emirates)	(United States)	(Japan)	(Spain)	(South Africa)	225	5th
2013	KTM	KTM; 250SX	3rd place, bronze medalist(s)	2nd place, silver medalist(s)	--	5	6	--	225	5th
2012	KTM	KTM; 250SX	(United Arab Emirates)	(United States)	(Turkey)	(Spain)	(Germany)	(Australia)	335	1st
2012	KTM	KTM; 250SX	1st place, gold medalist(s)	7	--	1st place, gold medalist(s)	6	1st place, gold medalist(s)	335	1st
2011	KTM	KTM; 250SX	(United Arab Emirates)	(Brazil)	(Italy)	(Spain)	(Poland)	(Australia)	180	7th
2011	KTM	KTM; 250SX	5	4	--	--	--	2nd place, silver medalist(s)	180	7th
2010	KTM	KTM; 250SX	(Mexico)	(Egypt)	(Russia)	(Spain)	(England)	(Italy)	290	4th
2010	KTM	KTM; 250SX	7	5	1st place, gold medalist(s)	5	1st place, gold medalist(s)	--	290	4th
2009	Kawasaki	Kawasaki; KX450F	(Mexico)	(Canada)	(United States)	(Spain)	(England)	X	210	6th
2009	Kawasaki	Kawasaki; KX450F	1st place, gold medalist(s)	7	--	--	2nd place, silver medalist(s)	X	210	6th

=== Nitro World Games ===
World Games	FMX		Stadia	Host
World Games	Freestyle	Best trick	Stadia	Host
2016 Nitro World Games	1st place, gold medalist(s)	--	Rice-Eccles Stadium	(United States) Salt Lake City
2017 Nitro World Games	1st place, gold medalist(s)	--	Rice-Eccles Stadium	(United States) Salt Lake City

Awards and achievements
Preceded by Incumbent	TransWorld Motocross Awards: FMX Rookie of the Year; 2009	Succeeded by Incumbent
