= Steve McCann =

Australian BMX rider (born 1983)

Personal information
- Full name: Steven McCann
- Born: 3 February 1983 (age 43)
- Height: 175 cm (5 ft 9 in)
- Weight: 68 kg (150 lb)

Cycling career
- Sport: Cycling
- Discipline: BMX
- Role: Rider

Professional teams
- 1999–?: Mongoose
- ?–: Alpinestars
- ?–: Movietickets.com
- ?–: GoPro

Steve McCann (born 3 February 1983) is an Australian BMX rider. McCann turned pro at the age of 16 in 1999.

McCann guest-starred alongside fellow Australian extreme sportsman, Renton Millar in an episode of Australian soap opera Neighbours in 2002. McCann earned Gold at X Games 17 for BMX Freestyle Big Air and Silver in BMX Freestyle Vert. At X Games 18 He earned Gold for BMX Freestyle Big Air.
