= Jeremy Stenberg =

American motocross rider

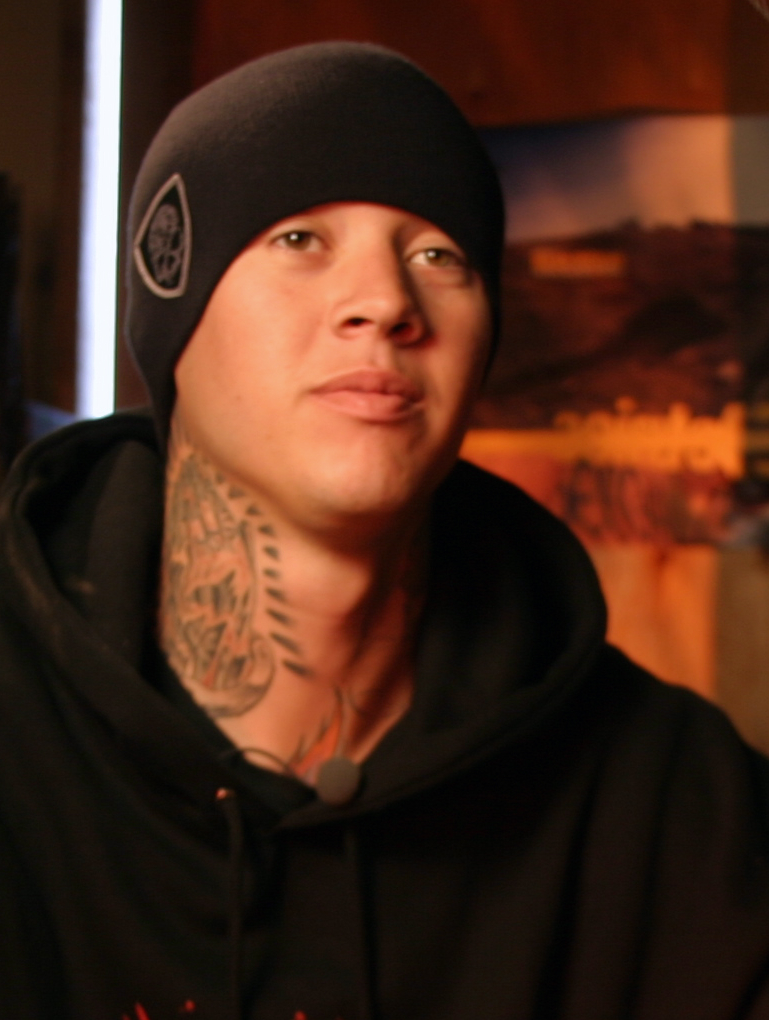
- Stenberg in 2004

Personal information
- Nickname: "Twitch"
- Born: September 27, 1981 (age 45) Spring Valley, California, U.S.
- Height: 6 ft 0 in (183 cm)
- Weight: 175 lb (79 kg)
- Spouse: Susie Stenberg (m. 2006)
- Children: 3

Sport
- Sport: Freestyle motocross (FMX), Off-road racing
- Events: X Games, Dew Tour, Red Bull X-Fighters
Medal record
Representing United States
Summer X Games
Gold medal – first place	2005 Los Angeles	Moto X Best Trick
Gold medal – first place	2011 Los Angeles	Moto X Best Whip
Gold medal – first place	2012 Los Angeles	Moto X Best Whip
Gold medal – first place	2013 Foz do Iguaçu	Moto X Best Whip
Gold medal – first place	2013 Munich	Moto X Best Whip
Silver medal – second place	2009 Los Angeles	Moto X Freestyle
Silver medal – second place	2013 Barcelona	Moto X Best Whip
Silver medal – second place	2013 Los Angeles	Moto X Best Whip
Silver medal – second place	2014 Austin	Moto X Best Whip
Silver medal – second place	World of X Real Moto	Moto X Real Moto
Bronze medal – third place	2001 Philadelphia	Moto X Step Up
Bronze medal – third place	2007 Los Angeles	Moto X Freestyle
Bronze medal – third place	2008 Los Angeles	Moto X Speed & Style
Bronze medal – third place	2010 Los Angeles	Moto X Speed & Style
Bronze medal – third place	2010 Los Angeles	Moto X Best Whip
Winter X Games
Gold medal – first place	2006 Aspen	Moto X Best Trick

Jeremy "Twitch" Stenberg (born September 27, 1981) is an American professional freestyle motocross rider and professional off-road truck racer. Stenberg received his nickname "Twitch" from his Tourette's syndrome, which he was diagnosed with at the age of eight. He started riding dirtbikes at the age of two so his father could spend more time with him and keep him out of their dangerous neighbourhood. He is a born again Christian.

== Other projects ==
In 2006, Stenberg starred in MTV's True Life: I Have Tourette's Syndrome.

In 2011, VH1 debuted their reality series The X-Life, in which Stenberg co-stars alongside BMX dirt rider Cory Nastazio, skateboard vert champion Pierre-Luc Gagnon (aka PLG) Nofea Uman and their families.

Stenberg has been racing off-road trucks in the Lucas Oil Off Road Racing Series and he won the 2010 Super Lite season championship. In 2015, he competed in the X Games' Stadium Super Trucks category, but failed to qualify for the final after finishing fourth and last in his heat race and the Last Chance Qualifier, respectively.

Stenberg also had his own DVD called Twitch: Hoodrich. He is featured in the 2026 music video For The Moment by Chris Brown.

== Career accomplishments ==
- 1998 Vans Triple Crown Champ
- 1998 Las Vegas LXD Freestyle and Step Up – 1st
- 2004 Vans Triple Crown Champ
- 2004 X-Fighters – 2nd
- 2005 Dew Action Sports Pro Tour Toyota Challenge – 1st
- 2005 Dew Action Sports Pro Tour FMX Overall Points – 2nd
- 2005 X-Fighters – 2nd
- 2008 ESPN Moto X Championships FMX – Silver
- 2008 ESPN Moto X Championships Speed & Style – Bronze
- 2008 Red Bull X-Fighters Brazil – 1st
- 2008 Red Bull X-Fighters Texas – 2nd
- 2008 LG Action Sports FMX World Championships – 1st
- 2010 Lucas Oil Off Road Racing Series Super Lite Truck champion

== X Games competition history ==
GOLD (6) SILVER (5) BRONZE (5)
World of X Real Moto 2016	MTX Real Moto	99th	
World of X Real Moto	MTX Real Moto	2nd	Silver medal
X Games Austin 2015	TRK Racing	15th	
X Games Austin 2015	MTX Best Whip	5th	
X Games Austin 2014	MTX Best Whip	2nd	Silver medal
X Games Los Angeles 2013	MTX Best Whip	2nd	Silver medal
X Games Munich 2013	MTX Best Whip	1st	Gold medal
X Games Barcelona 2013	MTX Best Whip	2nd	Silver medal
X Games Foz do Iguacu 2013	MTX Best Whip	1st	Gold medal
X Games Los Angeles 2012	MTX Speed & Style	6th	
X Games Los Angeles 2012	MTX Best Whip	1st	Gold medal
X Games 2011	MTX Best Whip	1st	Gold medal
X Games 2011	MTX Freestyle	6th	
X Games 2011	MTX Speed & Style	8th	
X Games 2010	MTX Best Whip	3rd	Bronze medal
X Games 2010	MTX Freestyle	14th	
X Games 2010	MTX Speed & Style	3rd	Bronze medal
X Games 2009	MTX Freestyle	2nd	Silver medal
X Games 2008	MTX Speed & Style	3rd	Bronze medal
X Games 2008	MTX Freestyle	4th	
X Games 2007	MTX Freestyle	3rd	Bronze medal
X Games 2007	MTX Best Trick	9th	
Winter X 2006	MTX Best Trick	1st	Gold medal
X Games 2005	MTX Freestyle	4th	
X Games 2005	MTX Best Trick	1st	Gold medal
X Games 2004	MTX Best Trick	6th	
Winter X 2004	MTX Best Trick	5th	
X Games 2003	MTX Step Up	6th	
X Games 2002	MTX Step Up	4th	
X Games 2001	MTX Step Up	3rd	Bronze medal
X Games 2001	MTX Freestyle	15th	
Winter X 2001	MTX Best Trick	12th	
X Games 2000	MTX Freestyle	13th	
X Games 1999	MTX Freestyle	6th	
