= Cam Sinclair =

Australian freestyle motocross rider

Cameron Sinclair
Personal information
- Full name: Cameron Sinclair
- Nicknames: Cam, Sincs
- Nationality: Australian
- Born: 12 April 1984 (age 42) Pearcedale, Victoria, Australia

Sport
- Sport: Motocross, Supercross, freestyle motocross
- Events: X Games, Dew Tour, Metal mulisha, X Fighters

Cameron Sinclair (born 12 April 1984) is an Australian freestyle motocross rider associated with the Metal mulisha group.

== Motocross career ==
Sinclair competed for the LG World Championship in 2008. He was injured while practicing for a double backflip in June 2008 and he was unable to compete until September 2008.

=== First double backflip in a Freestyle Run With Nick Swain ===
Sinclair landed the first double backflips in a freestyle motocross run at the third event of the Red Bull X-Fighters World Tour 2009. It was a June 2009 event in Fort Worth, Texas. Sinclair landed two double backflips in the competition and finished third at the event. The double backflips were in the qualifier and quarterfinals.

==== 2009 Madrid Crash ====
Sinclair was seriously injured in Madrid in July 2009 when he under rotated a double back flip. He was fighting for his life in a critical condition in Madrid. He suffered a broken shoulder, broken cheek bone, a ruptured liver and was knocked unconscious. Due to the rupture in his liver he had emergency surgery for internal bleeding, which was stopped by the surgeons. After retraining himself using therapy to walk and ride again, Sinclair is back competing, and he did one of the greatest comebacks in action sports history by successfully completing the double back flip again at X Games XVI, winning his first X Games gold medal in Moto X Best Trick.

== Personal life ==
Sinclair lives in Pearcedale, Victoria, Australia, and married longtime girlfriend, Brooke, on 7 January 2011 the couple has a daughter born Lotti Mae Sinclair on 15 September 2012. She was born in Melbourne, Australia.
