= Mat Rebeaud =

Swiss freestyle motocross rider (born 1982)

Personal information
- Full name: Mat Rebeaud
- Nickname: Air Mat
- Nationality: Swiss
- Born: 29 July 1982 (age 44) Payerne, Switzerland

Sport
- Sport: Freestyle motocross (FMX), Supercross
- Turned pro: 2002
Medal record
Representing Switzerland
Summer X Games
| Silver medal – second place | 2006 Los Angeles | Moto X Best Trick |
| Silver medal – second place | 2008 Los Angeles | Moto X Freestyle |
| Bronze medal – third place | X Games Foz do Iguaçu 2013 | Moto X Speed & Style |
Winter X Games
| Silver medal – second place | 2006 Aspen | Moto X Best Trick |

Mat Rebeaud (born 29 July 1982) is a Swiss freestyle motocross rider.

== Early life ==
Rebeaud was born and raised in Payerne, Switzerland. He was raised amongst a motocross family; his grandfather and father raced motocross back in 1965, and he started racing at a very young age.

== Career ==
In 2002 at the age of 20, Rebeaud decided to chase his childhood dreams and start racing motocross professionally. Through a love of jumping, he started practicing freestyle tricks and racing started taking a backseat to ramps and dirt hits. Freestyle soon became Mat's life.

In 2005, Rebeaud won the night of the jumps championship, It was the start of Mat's FMX career. Then in 2006, he won the FIM freestyle international motocross world championship.

== Career highlights ==
- 2008 Red Bull X-Fighters series champion
- 2008 Red Bull X-Fighters Germany 1st
- 2008 Red Bull X-Fighters Madrid 1st
- 2008 Red Bull X-Fighters Texas 1st
- 2008 Red Bull X-Fighters Rio 2nd
- 2008 Red Bull X-Fighters Mexico City 1st
- 2007 Red Bull X-Fighters series 2nd place
- 2007 Red Bull X-Fighters Madrid 2nd
- 2007 Red Bull X-Fighters Dublin 2nd
- 2006 Red Bull X-Fighters Mexico City 1st
- 2006 FIM Freestyle Motocross world champion
- 2005 Night of the jumps championship winner
