= Nate Adams =

American motorcycle racer

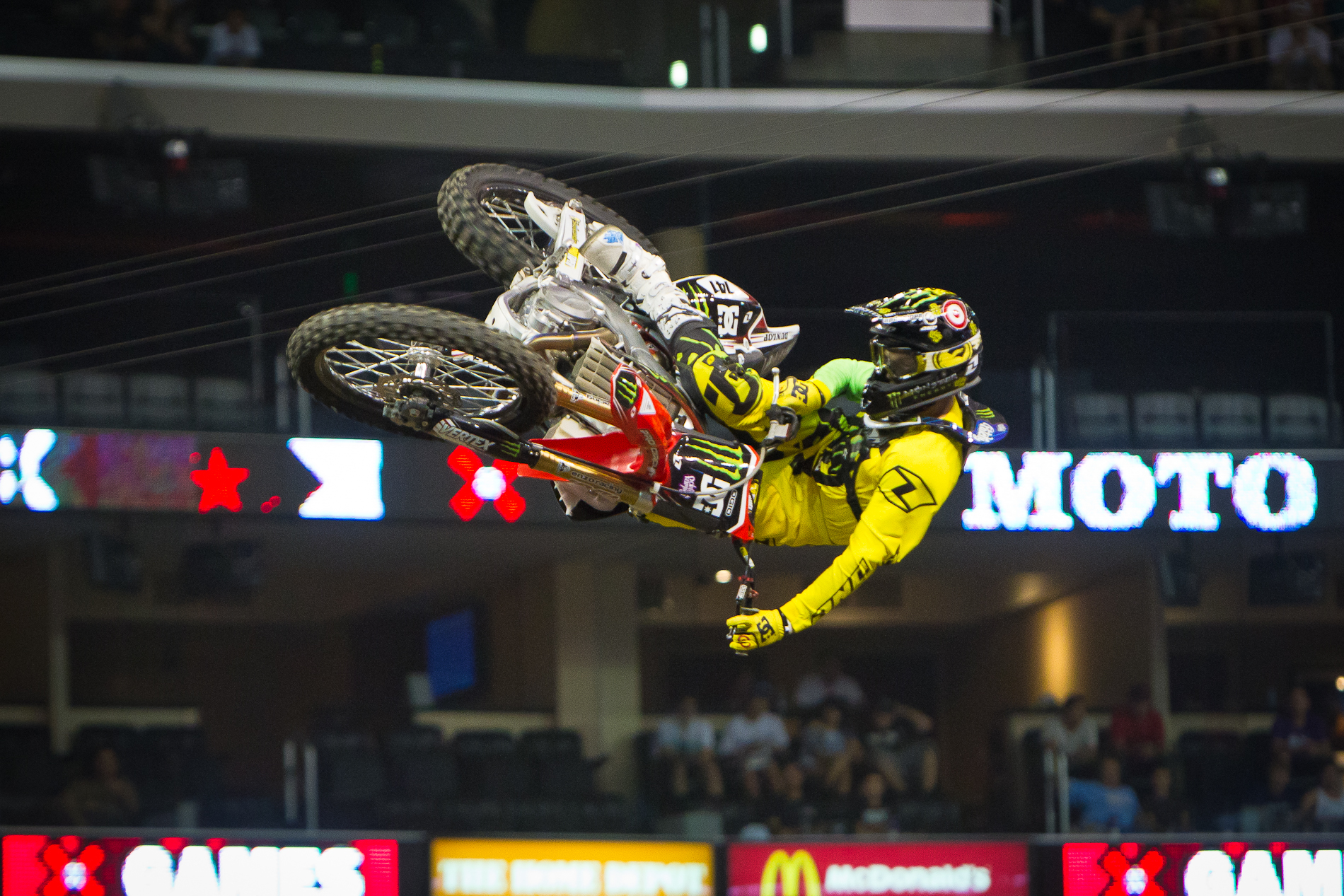
- Adams at the X Games in 2011

Personal information
- Full name: Nathaniel Adams
- Nicknames: Xecutioner, "The Destroyer" & "Nate Dog"
- Born: March 29, 1984 (age 42) Phoenix, Arizona, U.S.
- Height: 6 ft 0 in (183 cm)
- Weight: 165 lb (75 kg)

Sport
- Sport: Freestyle motocross (FMX)
- Events: Big Air, Step Up, Freestyle, Speed & Style
Medal record
Summer X Games
Representing United States
Gold medal – first place	2004 Los Angeles	Moto X Freestyle
Gold medal – first place	2011 Los Angeles	Moto X Freestyle
Gold medal – first place	2011 Los Angeles	Moto X Speed & Style
Gold medal – first place	X Games Los Angeles 2013	Moto X Speed & Style
Gold medal – first place	X Games Austin 2015	Moto X Speed & Style
Silver medal – second place	2003 Los Angeles	Moto X Freestyle
Silver medal – second place	2003 Los Angeles	Moto X Big Air
Silver medal – second place	2004 Los Angeles	Moto X Best Trick
Silver medal – second place	2007 Los Angeles	Moto X Freestyle
Silver medal – second place	2010 Los Angeles	Moto X Speed & Style
Silver medal – second place	X Games Los Angeles 2012	Moto X Speed & Style
Bronze medal – third place	2005 Los Angeles	Moto X Freestyle
Bronze medal – third place	2005 Los Angeles	Moto X Best Trick
Bronze medal – third place	2009 Los Angeles	Moto X Freestyle
Bronze medal – third place	2010 Los Angeles	Moto X Freestyle
Bronze medal – third place	X Games Barcelona 2013	Moto X Speed & Style
Bronze medal – third place	X Games Munich 2013	Moto X Speed & Style
Bronze medal – third place	X Games Los Angeles 2013	Moto X Freestyle
Winter X Games
Bronze medal – third place	2004 Aspen	Moto X Best Trick
Gravity Games
Gold medal – first place	2003 Cleveland	Moto X Freestyle

Nathaniel Adams (born March 29, 1984) is an American professional freestyle motocross rider and extreme sports athlete. A resident of Temecula, California, he attained national fame when he won the Freestyle Motocross World Championship in 2002. His nicknames are Xecutioner, "The Destroyer" and "Nate Dog".

== Biography ==
Adams was born in Phoenix, Arizona, and began riding when he was eight years old after his father bought him his first dirtbike. He graduated from Mountain Ridge High School in Glendale, Arizona in 2002. He was successful in both local and regional circuits, subsequently becoming well known in freestyle motocross by winning his first freestyle championship at the age of eighteen in 2002. Since then, Adams has won the gold medal at the X Games in 2004, the Gravity Games in 2003, and has enjoyed top finishes on the Vans Triple Crown. In 2007, Adams was awarded AST Dew Tour Athlete of the Year. In 2009, Adams became the Red Bull X-Fighters champion, clinching the title at London's Battersea Power Station. He also retained the title the following year, becoming the first rider to win double championships, and also the first rider to win back-to-back championships. He is a born-again Christian.

Some of Adams's current and past sponsors include: DC Shoes, Monster Energy, Target Corporation, Butterfinger, Yamaha Motor Company, Deft Family, Honda Racing Corporation, Dragon Optics, Alpinestars and One Industries.

== X Games competition history ==
GOLD (5) SILVER (6) BRONZE (8)
YEAR	X GAMES	EVENTS	RANK	MEDAL
2001	Summer X Games VII	Moto X Step Up	12th	
2001	Summer X Games VII	Moto X Big Air	12th	
2002	Winter X Games VI	Moto X Big Air	4th	
2002	Summer X Games VIII	Moto X Freestyle	8th	
2002	Summer X Games VIII	Moto X Big Air	5th	
2003	Winter X Games VII	Moto X Big Air	4th	
2003	Summer X Games IX	Moto X Freestyle	2nd	Silver medal
2003	Summer X Games IX	Moto X Big Air	2nd	Silver medal
2004	Winter X Games VIII	Moto X Best Trick	3rd	Bronze medal
2004	Summer X Games X	Moto X Best Trick	2nd	Silver medal
2004	Summer X Games X	Moto X Freestyle	1st	Gold medal
2005	Summer X Games XI	Moto X Best Trick	3rd	Bronze medal
2005	Summer X Games XI	Moto X Freestyle	3rd	Bronze medal
2006	Winter X Games X	Moto X Best Trick	4th	
2006	Summer X Games XII	Moto X Best Trick	4th	
2006	Summer X Games XII	Moto X Freestyle	9th	
2007	Summer X Games XIII	Moto X Freestyle	2nd	Silver medal
2008	Summer X Games XIV	Moto X Best Trick	7th	
2008	Summer X Games XIV	Moto X Speed & Style	8th	
2008	Summer X Games XIV	Moto X Freestyle	8th	
2009	Summer X Games XV	Moto X Freestyle	3rd	Bronze medal
2010	Summer X Games XVI	Moto X Freestyle	3rd	Bronze medal
2010	Summer X Games XVI	Moto X Speed & Style	2nd	Silver medal
2011	Summer X Games XVII	Moto X Freestyle	1st	Gold medal
2011	Summer X Games XVII	Moto X Speed & Style	1st	Gold medal
2011	Summer X Games XVII	Moto X Best Whip	6th	
2012	Summer X Games XVIII	Moto X Freestyle	4th	
2012	Summer X Games XVIII	Moto X Speed & Style	2nd	Silver medal
2013	X Games Barcelona 2013	Moto X Speed & Style	3rd	Bronze medal
2013	X Games Barcelona 2013	Moto X Best Whip	5th	
2013	X Games Munich 2013	Moto X Best Whip	4th	
2013	X Games Munich 2013	Moto X Speed & Style	3rd	Bronze medal
2013	X Games Los Angeles 2013	Moto X Freestyle	3rd	Bronze medal
2013	X Games Los Angeles 2013	Moto X Speed & Style	1st	Gold medal
2013	X Games Los Angeles 2013	Moto X Best Whip	6th	
2015	X Games Austin 2015	Moto X Speed & Style	1st	Gold medal
2016	X Games Austin 2016	Moto X Step Up	6th	
2016	X Games Austin 2016	Moto X Freestyle	8th	
2016	X Games Austin 2016	Moto X Best Whip	6th	
2017	X Games Minneapolis 2017	Moto X Best Whip	5th	
2018	X Games Minneapolis 2018	Moto X Best Whip	8th	

== Gravity Games ==
YEAR	GRAVITY GAMES	LOCATION	EVENTS	RANK	MEDAL
2003	Gravity Games V	Cleveland, OH	MTX Freestyle	1st	Gold medal
