= Gui Khury =

Brazilian skateboarder (born 2008)

Personal information
- Full name: Guilherme Zardo Khury
- Born: 18 December 2008 (age 17) Curitiba, Brazil
- Height: 5 ft 8 in (173 cm)

Sport
- Country: Brazil
- Sport: Skateboarding
- Event: Vert skateboarding
- Turned pro: 2019
Medal record
Men's skateboarding
Representing Brazil
World Championships
Silver medal – second place	2022 Buenos Aires	Vert
World Skate Games (Note: Both World Championships and World Skate Games represent skateboarding world titles by the World Skate (WS).)
Gold medal – first place	2024 Rome	Vert
Silver medal – second place	2026 Asunción	Vert
Bronze medal – third place	2026 Asunción	Park
X Games
Gold medal – first place	2021 Vista	Vert Best Trick
Gold medal – first place	2023 Southern California	Vert Best Trick
Gold medal – first place	2024 Chiba	Vert
Gold medal – first place	2024 Chiba	Vert Best Trick
Gold medal – first place	2024 Ventura	Vert Best Trick
Gold medal – first place	2025 Osaka	Vert
Gold medal – first place	2025 Osaka	Vert Best Trick
Gold medal – first place	2025 Salt Lake City	Vert
Gold medal – first place	2025 Salt Lake City	Vert Best Trick
Gold medal – first place	2026 Sacramento	Vert
Gold medal – first place	2026 Sacramento	Vert Best Trick
Gold medal – first place	2026 Chiba	Vert Best Trick
Gold medal – first place	2026 New Orleans	Vert Best Trick
Silver medal – second place	2022 Chiba	Vert Best Trick
Silver medal – second place	2022 Southern California	Vert
Silver medal – second place	2022 Southern California	Vert Best Trick
Silver medal – second place	2023 Southern California	MegaPark
Silver medal – second place	2026 Chiba	Vert
Bronze medal – third place	2022 Chiba	Vert
Bronze medal – third place	2023 Chiba	Vert Best Trick
- Updated on 10 October 2026

Guilherme Zardo Khury (born 18 December 2008) is a Brazilian skateboarder. He is the first person to land a 1080 (three full revolutions) on a vertical ramp and was the youngest person to win a gold medal at the X-Games (later broken by Ema Kawakami).

Khury previously held the record for being the youngest person ever to land a 900°, which he landed at age 8 (later broken by Ema Kawakami). He holds the record for being the youngest person to compete at the X Games at the age of 10 years and 7 months.

In 2020, he was officially awarded two Guinness World Records for being the Youngest X Games Athlete and for the first 1080 on a vert ramp, followed by a third in 2021 for being the youngest male X-Games gold medalist.

== Early life ==
Khury was born in Curitiba, Brazil in 2008, along with his twin sister to a family of Lebanese descent (“Khury” is Arabic for “priest”) . In 2011, his family moved to Carlsbad, California, when he was two years old. He started training at young age, being encouraged by his father. He started training at the YMCA in Encinitas, California, at the age of four. In 2015, the family moved back to Brazil, where his father built an indoor ramp for him to practice. He completed his first 540 at the age of 7, becoming the youngest to do so. Three months later, he had landed his first 720 and became the youngest in the world to land it. In July 2017, he suffered a serious accident, fracturing his skull when he fell from a second-story window, landing on a gas meter. At the age of 9, he became the youngest skater to descend a mega ramp, when he went down Bob Burnquist's 60-foot mega ramp In 2021, he landed "The McKenzie" (a 720° (making two complete turns) on the axis and landing with the back foot).

== Skateboarding highlights ==
=== 900 ===
In 2017, at the age of 8, Khury became the youngest person in the world to land a 900, a 2½-revolution (900 degrees) aerial spin performed on a skateboard ramp. Tony Hawk popularized this move when he was the first to achieve this feat, in 1999. (This record was later broken by Ema Kawakami in 2022)

=== X Games ===
Khury was invited to his first X Games at the 2019 X Games Summer Event in Minneapolis. By participating in the event, he became the youngest ever competitor at an X Games at the age of 10 years and 7 months, breaking the previous record set by Jagger Eaton seven years earlier. At the same time, he became the youngest athlete to land a 900 at an X Games.

=== 1080 ===
On 8 May 2020, at age 11, Khury became the first person to land a 1080 (three full revolutions) on a vertical ramp, breaking Tony Hawk’s record 900 on a vertical ramp set in 1999. (Tom Schaar landed the first-ever 1080 at the age of 12 in 2012 on a mega ramp, which allows a skater to build up more momentum -at a greater potential for bodily harm- than on a standard vert ramp.) He achieved it after 10 attempts. Khury performed the feat “in an indoor skateboard training facility built at his home in Curitiba, Brazil, by Green Box,” a Brazilian company. Khury's father, Ricardo Khury Filho, credited school closures due to the COVID-19 pandemic with providing his son extra time and energy to practice the technique. Professional skateboarders Bob Burnquist and Tony Hawk called him to congratulate him on the accomplishment.

=== X-Games Gold ===
On 16 July 2021, at the 2021 Summer X-Games, Khury became the youngest athlete to win a gold medal at the X-Games, at age 12, in the Skateboard Best Vert Trick competition, where he landed the first successful 1080 in a competition (after having initially completed the trick 14 months prior in solo training). Khury successfully landed a 1080 on the vertical ramp on his 7th and final attempt of the competition. Tony Hawk also was a competitor in the event, coming out of retirement to compete at the X-Games for the first time since 2003.

=== Further highlights ===
In April 2022, at the 2022 Spring X Games in Chiba, Japan, Khury landed another 1080 in the Vert Best Trick contest winning the silver medal, being defeated by Mitchie Brusco, and also won bronze in the Vert Skate competition, becoming the youngest person to ever win a medal in the event at the X Games. At the 2022 Summer X Games in Los Angeles, he won two silver medals in Vertical Skate and Vert Best Trick. In July 2022, he won gold at Vert Battle. In September 2022, he won silver in the Men's Park competition at the STU National 2022.

On 22 August 2024, Khury landed the world's first kickflip body varial 900 at his home ramp in Brazil.

== Guinness World Records ==
Record	Feat	Date	Location	Ref.
Youngest X Games Athlete	10 years, 225 days	31 July 2019	Minneapolis, USA	
First skateboard '1080' on a vertical ramp	1080	May 2020	Curitiba, Brazil	
Youngest X Games gold medallist (male)	12 years, 210 days	16 July 2021	Vista, California, USA	
