= 900 (skateboarding) =

2 1/2-revolution aerial spin performed on a skateboard ramp

The 900 is a 2½-revolution (900 degrees) aerial spin performed on a skateboard ramp. While airborne, the skateboarder makes two-and-a-half turns about their longitudinal axis, thereby facing down when coming down. It is considered one of skateboarding's most technically demanding tricks.

== Performance by Tony Hawk ==
Tony Hawk landing the 900 successfully at the X-Games V in 1999

On June 27, 1999, Tony Hawk, one of the most successful vertical pro skateboarders in the world, landed the 900 at X Games V after ten failed attempts. It was past regulation time but, as one announcer said, "We make up the rules as we go along. Let's give him another try." Other skaters protested, but Hawk continued. Hawk twice landed on his board, but it flew out from under him. When he finally completed the trick, his arms windmilled and his hand barely grazed the ramp. Nonetheless, he rode away.

In his book, the 900 was last on the wish-list of tricks Hawk had written down a decade earlier. Other tricks on the list included the ollie 540, kickflip 540, and varial 720. In a 1999 interview, Hawk said he does not have "any desire to spin further." He successfully landed the trick during press interviews for the video game Tony Hawk: Ride and at the "Tony Hawk: RIDE Presents Stand Up for Skate Parks" event. In 2011, Hawk was still able to land the 900, and posted a video of the trick via his Twitter account, stating, "I'm 43 and I did a 900 today." On June 27, 2016, Hawk was again successful.

== Pre-Hawk ==
A number of opinions exist about pre-1999 900s. The most prominent of these is the argument that Danny Way landed the 900 in 1989, and it appears in an early Santa Cruz film. In 1999, Tony Hawk said:

"Well, he was shown in a video almost 10 years ago. He was really close, but he didn't make it. He came the closest by far, but they cut the video before he fell. So it may have misled some people. There are only four people who have been able to spin completely and he's one of them. Tas Pappas and Rob Boyce also have spun it, but they haven't landed it."

== Successful landings ==
=== On vert ramp ===
1. Tony Hawk, June 27, 1999, X Games V, San Francisco, California, USA
2. Giorgio Zattoni, April 2004, Marianna HC, Ravenna, Italy
3. Sandro Dias, May 2004, Latin X-Games, Rio de Janeiro, Brazil
4. Alex Perelson, July 2009, Maloof Money Cup, Costa Mesa, California, USA
5. Zac Rose, April 2012 at Rye Airfield, New Hampshire, USA
6. Asher Bradshaw, May 23, 2014 at Woodward West in Tehachapi, California at the age of 10
7. Gui Khury, 2017, then-youngest person to land a 900 (age eight)
8. Thomas Augusto, May 2021, Braille House, San Leandro, CA
9. Ema Kawakami, August 2022, youngest person to land a 900 (age seven)
10. Arisa Trew, May 29, 2024, first female skateboarder to land a 900
11. Keefer Wilson, July 19, 2024, Tony Hawk's Vert Alert, Salt Lake City, Utah
12. JD Sanchez, August 11, 2024, X Games Vert Pro at the US Open of Surfing, Huntington Beach, California
13. Egoitz Bijueska, February 9, 2025 at Woodward West, CA
14. Parker Garhartt, Age 11, October 25, 2026, at Lvl Up, Vista California https://www.instagram.com/p/De7ozk1yKE5/

=== On mega ramp (Big air) ===
1. Bob Burnquist, September 4, 2010, first fakie-to-fakie indy 900 and first 900 on a mega ramp, Vista, California, USA
2. Mitchie Brusco, July 2011, Nescau MegaRamp Invitational, São Paulo, Brazil
3. Elliot Sloan, October 2, 2011, first tailgrab 900, Maloof Money Cup, South Africa
4. Tom Schaar, October 2011, on mega ramp at Woodward West in Tehachapi, California, USA
5. Jonathan Schwan, April 2013, on mega ramp at Woodward West in Tehachapi, California, USA
6. Tas Pappas, April 2014, at Megaranch, Melbourne, Australia
7. Keefer Wilson, October 2019, Megaranch mega ramp, Melbourne, Australia

== Beyond the 9 ==
=== 900 Variations ===
1. Kickflip Body Varial 900 - On August 22, 2024, Gui Khury landed the world's first kickflip body varial 900 at his home ramp in Brazil.

=== 1080s and more ===
1. In March 2012, Tom Schaar landed a 1080 on his fifth attempt at Woodward West, CA
2. In August 2019, Mitchie Brusco became the first person to land a 1260 (three full and one-half revolutions) in the Big Air competition at X Games Minneapolis.
3. In May 2020, Gui Khury landed the first 1080 on a vert ramp.

== Other sports ==
The 900 can also be attempted on a BMX bike, skis, snowboard, inline skates or a scooter. BMX rider Mat Hoffman was the first person to successfully land the 900 on film at a competition in Canada in 1989. In 2002 at X Games VIII, Hoffman took the trick a step further by landing a no-handed 900. BMX rider Simon Tabron's signature trick is the 900. In the 2007 at X Games XIII, Simon Tabron landed the first back-to-back 900s on a bike.

Because the gear of snowboarders, skiers, and inline skaters is affixed to their feet, the 900 is not considered to be a difficult trick for professionals in those sports and is performed comparatively often. 1620- and 1800-degree spins have been landed on skis, a 1620 has been performed on a snowboard as well as on inline skates, and a 1080 on BMX and on scooter.
