= Mia Kretzer =

Australian skateboarder (born 2014)

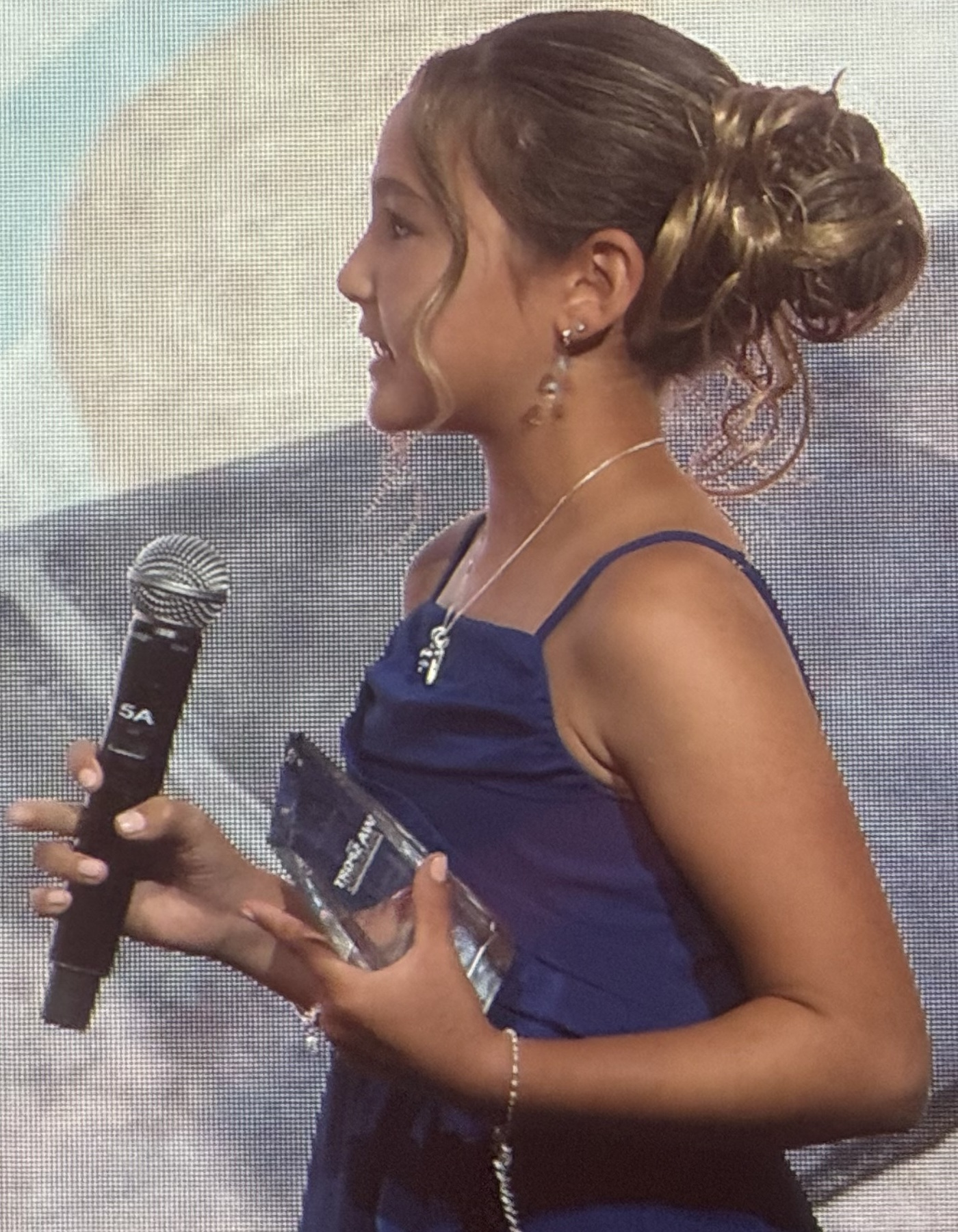
- Krezter at the 2025 Western Australian Sport Awards

Personal information
- Nickname: Mims
- Born: 5 October 2014 (age 11) Perth, Western Australia

Sport
- Country: Australia
- Sport: Skateboarding
- Event: Vert
Medal record
Women's skateboarding
Representing Australia
X Games
Gold medal – first place	2024 Ventura	Vert best trick
Gold medal – first place	2026 Chiba	Vert best trick
Gold medal – first place	2026 Sacramento	Vert
Gold medal – first place	2026 New Orleans	Vert best trick
Silver medal – second place	2026 Chiba	Vert
Silver medal – second place	2026 New Orleans	Vert
Bronze medal – third place	2026 Sacramento	Vert best Trick

Mia Kretzer (born 5 October 2014) is an Australian skateboarder. She is the youngest competitor and gold medalist in X Games history.

== Early life ==
Kretzer attends Bateman Primary School in Bateman, Western Australia. She began skateboarding at five years old after attending a skateboarding clinic. She is self-taught and doesn't have a coach.

== Career ==
In April 2024, Kretzer was selected to compete at Tony Hawk's Vert Alert competition. She then made her X Games debut in June 2024 where she became the youngest competitor in X Games history. During the best trick competition she landed a 720 and won a gold medal. At age 9 years, 8 months, she became the youngest gold medalist in X Games history. She defeated reigning champion, and fellow Australian, Arisa Trew, who failed at her final two attempts to complete a 900. She was officially awarded three Guinness World Records for the Youngest X Games Athlete, Youngest X Games medalist (female) and Youngest X Games gold medalist (female). She was named the 2025 Western Australian Junior Sport Star.

In March 2026, at age 11, she was the youngest athlete drafted in the inaugural X Games League draft. In June 2026, she competed at the inaugural X Games League competition in Sacramento, California and won a gold medal in the vert event and a bronze medal in the vert best trick event. Weeks later, she competed at the Skate Australia National Park Championships at the Gold Coast and won a gold medal in the Rumble on the Beach park event.
