= Tony Hawk's Vert Alert =

Skateboarding competition

- Sport: Skateboarding
- Founded: 2021
- Founder: Tony Hawk
- First season: 2021
- Country: United States
- Venues: Rotating Venues in Salt Lake City, Utah

Tony Hawk's Vert Alert is a professional Vert skateboarding competition held annually in Salt Lake City, Utah since 2021. Famed vert skateboarding legend and entrepreneur Tony Hawk created the tournament, which is contested on his personal Vert ramp. The competition includes a standard vert competition and a best trick session.

== Background and competition format ==
By 2021, Hawk, having just recently stepped out of professional retirement for a single brief competition at the 2021 X Games, felt that vert skateboarding was a dying art. Street and park had apparently become more popular brands of skateboarding over the prior decade, and competitions like Street League Skateboarding were regularly filling basketball arenas, while vert competitions had become limited to the X games and few others. Another point of concern for Hawk was the quality of competition vert ramps, often times featuring uneven walls, noticeable seams, and obstacles intended for tricks that inadvertently became hinderances for riders. Beginning in 2021, through a partnership with the Utah Sports Commission, Hawk began hosting his own tournament, contested on his own personal vert ramp, transported from Hawk's private skatepark in Vista, California.

In the standard vert tournament, Riders are split into groups of 8, and all go in order taking untimed runs for a 25 minute jam session. After 30 seconds, skaters are no longer penalized for bailing or deliberately ending their runs. Skaters are judged cumulatively on overall impression of all runs combined. In the best trick competition, riders skate for a 20 minute jam session, only trying to complete a single trick. Extra time is often granted after the jam session to skaters who could not complete their trick in the allotted time, although these runs do not count. Arisa Trew of Australia became the first woman to land a 720 on a skateboard in one of these post-competition runs at the 2023 competition.

== Venue and media coverage ==
In 2021 and 2022, the tournament was held outdoors at the Days of '47 rodeo arena at the Utah State Fairpark. Due to concerns of maintaining the wooden vert ramp outdoors in the summer heat, the competition was moved to the Delta Center, home of the NBA's Utah Jazz. In 2024 and 2025, because of renovations to the Delta Center to prepare it for the incoming NHL franchise, the Utah Hockey Club, the competition was instead held at the Jon M. Huntsman Center on campus of the University of Utah.

Rather than a conventional linear television partner, all tournaments have been YouTube livestreamed on RIDE channel. For the 2021-2023 editions, action sports broadcaster Chris Cote provided play-by-play, while Hawk and Paul Zitzer served as color analysts. In 2024, former X Games broadcaster Selema Masekela provided play-by-play, while Hawk, Zitzer, and Lizzie Armanto provided color commentary. In 2025, Zitzer moved into the play-by-play seat, calling the tournament with Amelia Brodka.

== Results ==
Vert
Women

Edition	Gold	Silver	Bronze
2021	Sky Brown (GBR)	Bryce Wettstein (USA)	Kihana Ogawa (JPN)
2022	Lilly Stoephasius (GER)	Bryce Wettstein (USA)	Arisa Trew (AUS)
2023	Arisa Trew (AUS)	Asahi Kaihara (JPN)	Reese Nelson (CAN)
2024	Arisa Trew (AUS)	Mizuho Hasegawa (JPN)	Asahi Kaihara (JPN)
2025	Arisa Trew (AUS)	Mizuho Hasegawa (JPN)	Mia Kretzer (AUS)

Men

Edition	Gold	Silver	Bronze
2021	Edouard Damestoy (FRA)	Jimmy Wilkins (USA)	Rony Gomes (BRA)
2022	Jimmy Wilkins (USA)	Mitchie Brusco (USA)	Moto Shibata (JPN)
2023	Edouard Damestoy (FRA)	Moto Shibata (JPN)	Jimmy Wilkins (USA)
2024	Gui Khury (BRA)	Moto Shibata (JPN)	Mitchie Brusco (USA)
2025	Gui Khury (BRA)	JD Sanchez (USA)	Egoitz Bijueska (ESP)

Best Trick
2021
Women: Sky Brown, Men: Jimmy Wilkins
2022
Women: Reese Nelson, Men: Edouard Damestoy
2023
Women: Reese Nelson, Men: Moto Shibata
2024
Women: Arisa Trew, Men: Keefer Wilson
2025
Women: Arisa Trew, Men: Ao Nishikawa

== Prize money ==
In the 2025, edition. The third place finisher in the vert competition was awarded US $4,000, the runner-up was awarded US $5,000, and the champion was awarded US $10,000. Best Trick contestants are both given cash on the spot for completing tricks, and US $5,000 is awarded to the winner. Tony Hawk's vert alert has been known to pride itself on equal prize money for contestants in the women's competitions.
