= Centro Administrativo Fernando Ferrari =

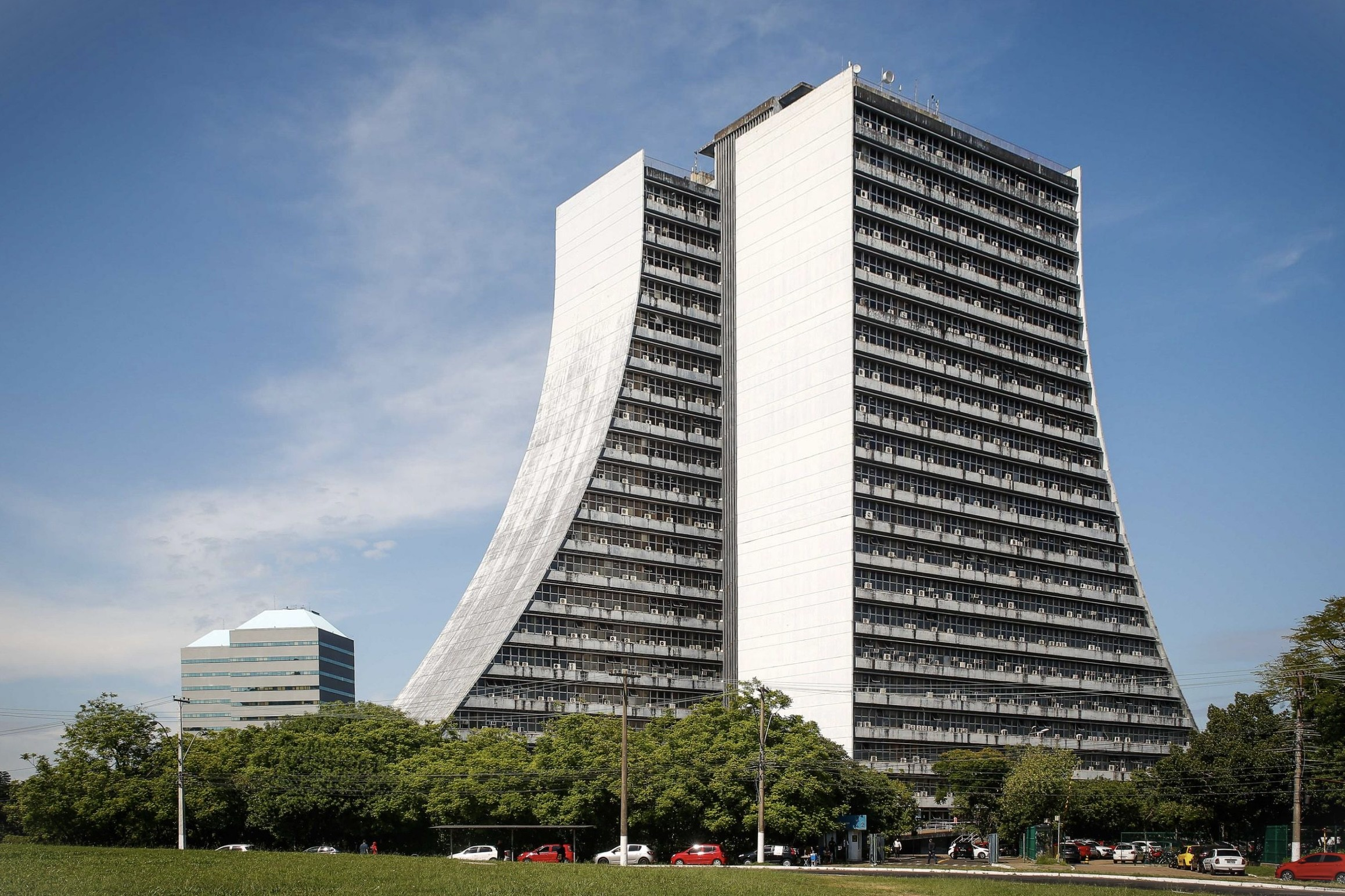
- Interactive map of the Centro Administrativo Fernando Ferrari area
- Former names: Centro Administrativo do Estado do Rio Grande do Sul

General information
- Location: Porto Alegre, Brazil
- Coordinates: 30°02′S 51°14′W
- Construction started: 26 December 1986
- Completed: 10 March 1987

Height
- Height: 85 m

Technical details
- Floor count: 21

Centro Administrativo Fernando Ferrari, formerly Centro Administrativo do Estado do Rio Grande do Sul is a pyramid-shaped modernist building located on Largo dos Açorianos, at the Praia de Belas neighborhood in Porto Alegre, Rio Grande do Sul, Brazil. Built during the 1970 decade and completed in 1987, the building houses several state public offices, and is home of the Porto Alegre Symphony Orchestra. It is named in honor to the economist and politician Fernando Ferrari.

== History ==
=== Construction and inauguration ===
The idea of centralizing public administration bodies in a single architectural complex had already been considered since 1956, with the construction of buildings around the Praça da Matriz. Years later, the then mayor of Porto Alegre, José Loureiro da Silva, approved legislation in 1962 that established the Administrative Center in the vicinity of Borges de Medeiros Avenue and the Parobé Technical School. After several proposals over the years, the project was finally authorized on 12 July 1971, and construction began on 26 December 1976, by Decree no.º 21.190, signed by the then governor, Euclides Triches, involving a team of five architects linked to the former State Works Department, with a design inspired by modern architecture such as that of Brasilia. The area earmarked for the project was 128,000 square meters and its construction, carried out by Companhia Estadual de Desenvolvimento Regional e Obras (Cedro) and Knorr Construções, began on 26 December 1976, on a site with a total area of 201,215 square meters.

The proposal was to bring together the main municipal, state and federal public bodies in a space for common use, occupying an area of 128,000 m². There would also be the Palace of Dispatches, an exclusive space for the governor, which was never built. Scheduled for 1986, the complex was only inaugurated on 10 March 1987. The building has 21 floors and is 85 meters high, divided into two wings, North and South.

== Skate ramp ==
On 25 September 2025, Brazilian skateboarder Sandro Dias skated down a 70-meter ramp built over the building's curved shape at an event organized by Red Bull, breaking two world records: highest drop-in and fastest speed on a standard skateboard (103 km/h, approximately 64 mph).
