= 1260 (disambiguation) =

1260 may refer to:

- 1260 (number), a natural number
- AD 1260 (MCCLX), a year in the Common Era
- 1260 BC, a year Before the Common Era
- 1260 AM, an AM radio frequency
- 1260 (computer virus), a DOS computer virus
- 1260 (skateboarding), a skateboarding trick
