= Drop-In (disambiguation) =

Drop-In was a 1970s Canadian television series.

Drop-In may also refer to:

- Drop-in center, a service agency
- Dropping in, a skateboarding trick
