= 1260 (number) =

← 1259	1260	1261 →
- List of numbers; Integers; ← 0 1k 2k 3k 4k 5k 6k 7k 8k 9k →
- Cardinal: one thousand two hundred sixty
- Ordinal: 1260th (one thousand two hundred sixtieth)
- Factorization: 2^{2} × 3^{2} × 5 × 7
- Divisors: 1, 2, 10, 20, 1260
- Greek numeral: ,ΑΣΞ´
- Roman numeral: MCCLX, mcclx
- Binary: 10011101100_{2}
- Ternary: 1201200_{3}
- Senary: 5500_{6}
- Octal: 2354_{8}
- Duodecimal: 890_{12}
- Hexadecimal: 4EC_{16}

1260 (one thousand two hundred [and] sixty or twelve hundred [and] sixty) is the natural number and integer following 1259 and preceding 1261.

== In mathematics ==
1260 is a highly composite number, a superabundant number, a unitary amicable pair with 1140, and a pronic number. 1260 is the number of board arrangements with 4 pieces that satisfies gravity and have equal numbers of each color for even numbers or one extra piece of the first player's color for odd numbers in Connect Four. There are 1260 strict partitions of 41.

=== Vampire number ===
Vampire numbers are composite natural numbers with an even amount of digits, which can be factored into two natural numbers, each with half as many digits as the original number where the two factors contain all the digits of the original number, in any order, counting multiplicity.

In this case, 1260 is the first vampire number, since 1260 has 4 digits, which is even, and it can be divided into two natural numbers: 1260 = 21 × 60.

== In skateboarding ==
1260 (pronounced twelve-sixty) is a skateboarding trick performed in a mega ramp in which the skateboarder spins through three-and-a-half full revolutions (or 1260° of a rotational angle) while airborne.
