= Confeitaria Rocco =

Brazilian historic building

Rocco Confectionery
- Confeitaria Rocco
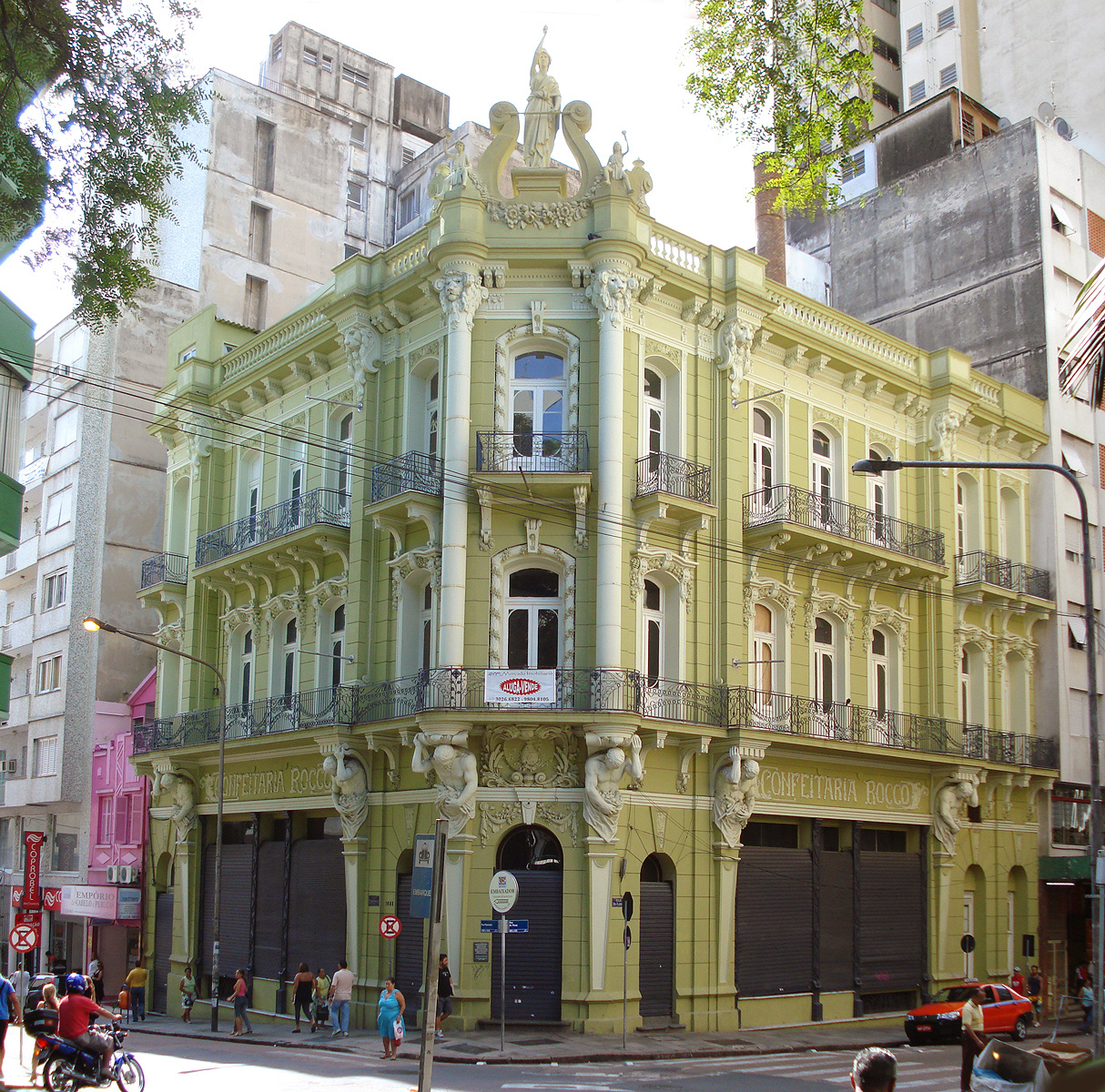
- Established: September 12, 1912
- Location: Porto Alegre, Rio Grande do Sul; Brazil
- Coordinates: 30°01′53.421″S 51°13′30.323″W

Confeitaria Rocco (English: Rocco Confectionery) is a historic building located in Porto Alegre, capital of Rio Grande do Sul. It is situated on the corner of Riachuelo and Dr. Flores streets, next to Conde de Porto Alegre square, formerly Praça do Portão (English: Gate Square). For its historical importance, it is listed as a heritage site by the City Hall of Porto Alegre.

== History ==
The owner was Nicolau Rocco (1861-1932), an Italian who, before settling in Brazil, had worked at the famous El Molino Confectionery, in Buenos Aires.

Based on the experience gained there, he founded the Confeitaria Sul-América in Porto Alegre, in 1892. In 1910, as the city and its businesses developed, Nicolau contracted the construction of a splendid building that included a candy factory, confectionery shop and ballroom to the architect Salvador Lambertini, who died before the work was finished. The work was completed under the supervision of Manoel Barbosa Assumpção Itaqui and inaugurated on September 20, 1912. The Atlas on the facade were made by Giuseppe Gaudenzi, and the group on the pediment was designed by Frederico Pellarin, possibly assisted by Gustavo Steigleder, since they had a joint workshop.

The ballroom was often used for banquets and aristocratic balls, and many societies were born there. Góis Monteiro, Eurico Gaspar Dutra, Getúlio Vargas, Daltro Filho and Mário de Andrade are among the people who frequented it. The Confeitaria Rocco was listed as a heritage site by the City Hall in 1997.

== The building ==
The total area of the building is 1,560 m^{2} divided into four floors. Its structure is made of mud brick masonry and iron beams. Initially, the candy factory was in the basement and the first floor was used for the confectionery, where the common public had access. The second floor housed the ballroom, and the third floor was reserved for the pantry and support rooms. A beautiful panorama of the city could be seen from the terrace, where there was also a storage room.

On the facade, the huge Atlas of imposing size and monolithic constitution stand out, with two features: three of them are young, representing America and Plenty, and three others are old, symbolizing Europe and Abundantia. All of them hold a balcony above with one hand and a basket of fruits of the earth with the other. In the pediment that crowns the building, a sculptural group symbolizes Light, with a central female figure placed inside a lyre, and two children at the sides. The allusion to the arts, and especially to music, is explicit.

The exquisite ironwork of the balconies, the large columns and pilasters with lion's head capitals, the large ornamental relief signs with the name of the company, and the profuse decoration of friezes, cornices, corbels and the balustraded platband are also remarkable. The external window frames are still the originals.

The place became a meeting point for the society of Rio Grande do Sul due to the quality of its services and products, the external beauty of the building and the sumptuousness of the internal spaces, decorated with luxury and refinement, with fairytale lighting, a furniture of tables and counters with marble tops, and cabinets of rich wood carving. There were also large decorative paintings on the walls.

== See also ==
- History of Porto Alegre
- Architecture of Porto Alegre

== Additional reading ==
- Doberstein, Arnoldo Walter (1992). Estatuária e Ideologia - Porto Alegre: 1900 - 1920. Porto Alegre: SMC.
