= Ema Kawakami =

Japanese skateboarder (born 2014)

Personal information
- Born: 8 September 2014 (age 12) Kobe, Japan

Sport
- Country: Japan
- Sport: Skateboarding
- Event: Vert skateboarding
Medal record
Men's skateboarding
Representing Japan
X Games
Gold medal – first place	2026 Chiba	Vert
Bronze medal – third place	2025 Salt Lake City	Vert
Bronze medal – third place	2026 Sacramento	Vert best trick

Ema Kawakami (born 8 September 2014) is a Japanese skateboarder. He is the youngest person to land a 900 and the first person to land three consecutive 900s.

== Career ==
In August 2022, Kawakami became the youngest person to successfully land a 900 at the age of seven. Kawakami won the 2023 Japan Skateboarding Federation vertical contest and the Wingram Cup 2023 Vertical Series Vol. 1. He also holds the Guinness World Record for the most backside 540 skateboard tricks in one minute with eight tricks completed.

In April 2024, he was added to GoPro's professional athlete team. On June 15, 2024, at the age of nine, he became the first person to land three consecutive 900s, completing the feat at the 2024 Tony Hawk's Vert Alert competition, in front of Tony Hawk himself, the first person to ever successfully land a 900.

In July 2025, Kawakami landed a 1080 at the 2025 X-Games Salt Lake City, winning bronze.
