= 1080 (skateboarding) =

Skateboarding trick

The 1080 is a skateboarding trick that can be performed on a vertical skateboard ramp or on a mega ramp, in which the skateboarder makes three full revolutions (1080 degrees of rotation in total, hence the name) while airborne. It was first completed successfully on a mega ramp in 2012 by American skateboarder Tom Schaar, and on a vert ramp in May 2020 by Brazilian skateboarder Gui Khury. The 1080 has only ever been landed after a fakie ollie, meaning the rider is in the normal stance, but rolling in the opposite direction, popping off of the tail.

== Mega ramp (big air) ==
The first-ever 1080 was landed by American skateboarder Tom Schaar on March 26, 2012, at the age of 12. Schaar completed the stunt on a mega ramp at Woodward West in Tehachapi, California, on his fifth attempt. The jump was filmed by several cameras at the MegaRamp at Woodward West. A roll-over feature was custom-built which allowed the skater to drop in on the 70-foot-tall and roll right over a 50-foot gap in the ramp, thus allowing Schaar to keep momentum going all the way through to the quarter pipe. Schaar performed several 720s and a 900 while warming-up. He then attempted to perform the 1080, failing four times before successfully landing his fifth attempt, being propelled 15 feet above the top of the ramp.

Red Bull described the 1080 as "the Holy Grail of all skateboard tricks." Schaar has since repeated the feat, and completed a 1080 in competition while participating in the 2012 X Games Asia on April 30, 2012. He won the gold medal in the Skateboard Mini MegaRamp category, the youngest person ever to have done so. At The Dew Tour Ocean City Tom landed the 1080 in Skate Mega 2.0 which resulted in him coming first.

== Vert ramp (regular half pipe) ==
In May 2020, at the age of 11, Brazilian skateboarder Gui Khury became the first person to land a 1080 using only a vert ramp, breaking the previous record for a 900 on a vert ramp set by Tony Hawk in 1999. (Khury had previously become the youngest person to land a 900, which he achieved at age 8.) His father credited the COVID-19 pandemic with providing his son the opportunity to practice the technique.

At the 2021 X Games, 12 year old Khury successfully landed a 1080 on the vertical ramp, making him the youngest gold medal winner in X Games history.

== Successful landings ==
=== Vert ramp ===
1. Gui Khury, 8 May 2020, Curitiba, Brazil
2. Gui Khury, 16 July 2021, 2021 X-Games, Vista, California
3. Gui Khury, 23 April 2022, 2022 X-Games Chiba, Japan
4. Ema Kawakami, July 2025, 2025 X-Games Salt Lake City, Utah

=== MegaRamp ===
1. Tom Schaar, 30 March 2012, at MegaRamp Woodward West, Tehachapi, California (USA)
2. Jonathan Schwan, 29 April 2013, at MegaRamp Woodward West, Tehachapi, California (USA)
3. Mitchie Brusco, 17 May 2013, at XGames Barcelona, Spain
4. Mitchie Brusco, 21 July 2018, at XGames Minneapolis, USA
