= Arisa Trew =

Australian skateboarder (born 2010)

Arisa Trew OAM
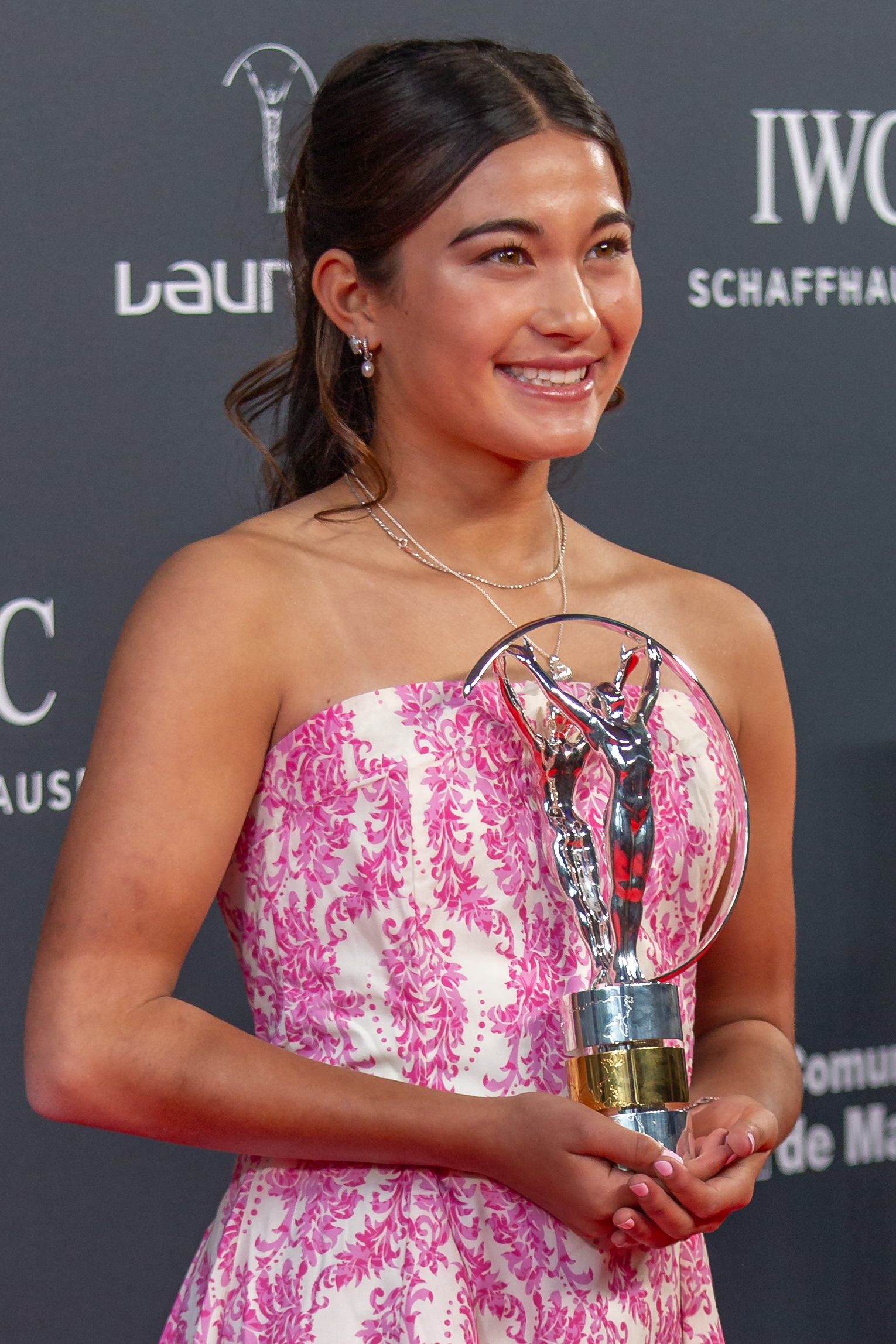
- Trew with her 2024 Laureus Action Sportsperson Award

Personal information
- Born: 12 May 2010 (age 16) Cairns, Queensland, Australia
- Home town: Palm Beach, Gold Coast, Queensland, Australia

Sport
- Sport: Skateboarding
- Position: Regular footed
- Rank: 2nd
- Events: Park, vert
Medal record
Women's park skateboarding
Representing Australia
Olympic Games
Gold medal – first place	2024 Paris	Park
World Championships
Gold medal – first place	2024 Rome	Vert
X Games
Gold medal – first place	2023 California	Park
Gold medal – first place	2023 California	Vert
Gold medal – first place	2024 Ventura	Park
Gold medal – first place	2024 Ventura	Vert
Gold medal – first place	2024 Chiba	Park
Gold medal – first place	2025 Osaka	Vert
Gold medal – first place	2025 Osaka	Park
Silver medal – second place	2025 Salt Lake City	Vert
Gold medal – first place	2026 Sacramento	Park
Gold medal – first place	2026 Sacramento	Vert Best Trick

Arisa Trew OAM (アリサ・トゥルー, born 12 May 2010) is an Australian skateboarder. She won the gold medal for the women's park skateboarding event at the 2024 Summer Olympics in Paris at the age of 14 making her Australia's youngest ever Olympic champion. She is the first women's skateboarder to land a 720 and a 900 in competition.

== Early life ==
Trew was born on 12 May 2010 in Cairns, Queensland, Australia. Her mother, Aiko, is Japanese and her father, Simon, is Welsh. She moved to the Gold Coast where she grew up from the age of two and started skateboarding at the age of seven. Arisa is of no relation to fellow Australian Olympic skateboarder Ruby Trew, however they are good friends and often tell people they are cousins.

== Career ==
In May 2023, Trew placed 4th at the 2023 Japan X Games for the women's park event.

On 23 June 2023, during Tony Hawk's Vert Alert event held in Salt Lake City, Arisa became the first female skateboarder to successfully execute a 720 trick in a competition; the trick involves completing two full rotations in mid-air. That trick was made famous by professional skateboarder Tony Hawk, who first performed it in 1985.

In July 2023, Trew won the women's vert as well as the park Gold medals at the 2023 X Games in California. Trew repeated this feat in June 2024 by winning once again both the vert and the park Gold medals at the 2024 X Games in Ventura, California.

In March 2024, Trew placed 4th at the World Skateboarding Tour in Dubai for the women's park event.

In April 2024, Trew received the Laureus World Sports Award for Action Sportsperson of the Year at the Laureus World Sports Awards.

On 29 May 2024, Trew became the first female skateboarder to land a 900, which she did in a half-pipe.

At the 2024 Olympic Qualifier Series, Trew placed first in both park qualifiers.

At the Osaka X Games in 2025, Trew beat the record for most X Games Skateboard gold medals by any girl or woman, and tied Fabiola da Silva for the most X Games summer discipline gold medals by any girl or woman. She also tied the record for the most X Games gold medals won by a teenager (seven), and won an unprecedented fourth consecutive women’s park title.

=== 2024 Summer Olympics ===
On 6 August 2024, she won the gold medal in the park event at the Paris Olympic Games, making her the youngest Australian to ever win an Olympic gold medal at the age of 14. Prior to winning, she had made a deal with her parents that if she won gold, they would get her a pet duck.

== Recognition ==
- 2024 – AIS Sport Performance Awards – Emerging Athlete of the Year
- 2025 – Medal of the Order of Australia (OAM) – for service to sport as a gold medallist at the Paris Olympic Games 2024.
