= Town Hall of Porto Alegre =

- Paço Municipal de Porto Alegre
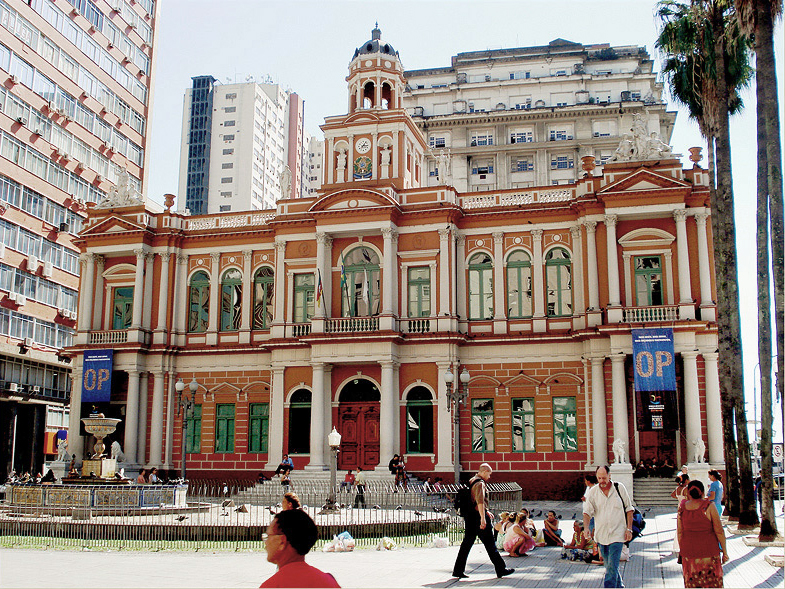
- Interactive map of the Town Hall of Porto Alegre area

General information
- Architectural style: Eclecticism
- Location: Porto Alegre, Praça Montevidéu, nº 10, Brazil
- Coordinates: 30.028199371758255°S 51.22858642250275°W
- Construction started: 28 September 1898
- Inaugurated: April 1901
- Owner: Porto Alegre municipal government

Design and construction
- Architect: Giovanni Colfosco

Website
- Official website

The Town Hall of Porto Alegre (Portuguese: Paço Municipal de Porto Alegre), also known as Old City Hall (Portuguese: Prefeitura Velha) or Paço dos Açorianos, is a historic building in Porto Alegre, capital of the Brazilian state of Rio Grande do Sul, being one of the most characteristic and important architectural landmarks of the city. It was inaugurated in 1901, with a project by Giovanni Colfosco, hosting the mayor's office and administrative bodies for a long time. It was listed by the municipality in 1979 and, after extensive renovations in 2003, it began to lend some of its rooms for art exhibitions, also having the offices and technical reserve of the Artistic Collection of the City Hall of Porto Alegre there. In 2022, during the celebrations week of the city's 250th anniversary, the mayor handed over the building to the administration of the Municipal Secretariat of Culture, which intends to transform it into a museum, the Museum of Art of Porto Alegre.

== History ==
The Town Hall was built to be the headquarters of the Intendance of Porto Alegre, which until then operated in several rented spaces in the Historic Center of Porto Alegre. Once elected by the Republican Party in 1897, intendant José Montaury committed himself to the construction of a permanent headquarters for the local Executive power. This required landfilling at Doca do Carvão and the sale of municipal real estate in order to raise funds for the building.

The first project for the Intendency was that of the engineer Oscar Bittencourt, but due to political considerations the project was vetoed and a new design was commissioned from Venetian engineer Giovanni Colfosco. The cornerstone was laid on 5 April 1898, and construction began on 28 September of that same year. The building was completed in April 1901, being occupied from 15 May by the Municipal Council, the Secretariat, Accounting, Treasury and Collection, in addition to the Public Archives, Vehicle Inspectorate, Public Assistance and the first Police Station, with its respective jail. The final cost of the work reached 500 million réis, and most of the materials used came from Porto Alegre itself.

In 1977 it was included by the municipal government in the Inventory of Real Estate of Historical and Cultural Value and of Expressive Tradition, being listed by the municipality on 21 November 1979. In the square in front of it the building lies the Talavera de La Reina Fountain, donated by the Spanish colony in honor of the centenary of the Ragamuffin War.

It underwent a profound renovation in 2003, adapting several internal spaces for art exhibitions and for the safekeeping of the Porto Alegre City Hall Art Collection. At the end of 2021 it was announced that the building would no longer house the administrative headquarters of the City Hall. In early 2022, the municipal government began its move to a new address, the Habitasul Building, at Travessa General João Manoel n° 157, and on 26 March, the building was handed over to the Municipal Secretariat of Culture, which will transform it into a museum, the Museum of Art of Porto Alegre. The ceremony was part of the celebrations for the 250th anniversary of Porto Alegre. However, the mayor's office and the Noble Hall will be reserved for the use of the Executive.

== Description ==
It is the first building of a clearly positivist character in Porto Alegre, and whose general layout, in the shape of an H, left profound influences on the official architecture of the period. The building reflects the prevailing taste for monumentality at the time, and follows an eclectic style derived from neoclassical patterns, and influenced by positivist guidelines, as can be seen from the allegorical statuary on the facade. In the group on the right, next to Borges de Medeiros Avenue, the central figure represents Liberty and the one on the right, History; the bust of Pericles, Democracy; the figure on the left represents Science. The central figure of the group placed near Uruguai Street represents Agriculture; the one on the right represents Commerce; and the one on the left Industry. In addition, isolated statues representing Justice and the Republic. On the front façade there are busts of José Bonifácio and Deodoro da Fonseca. In the center is the Coat of Arms of the Republic.

The use of classical orders did not prevent creative and symbolic adaptations of traditional stylistic patterns. For example, the Doric order on the ground floor represents Power, and the Corinthian, at the top, Harmony and Justice. The body of the building has a busy, tripartite volume, with angular elements projecting forward. All four facades are decorated, although the statuary and greater ornamentation are concentrated on the main facade, where a small central tower also rises. It is also ornated with shed windows with eardrums, parapets, balustrades, base simulating rustic stone, and large marble lions on the front side stairs.

== Gallery ==
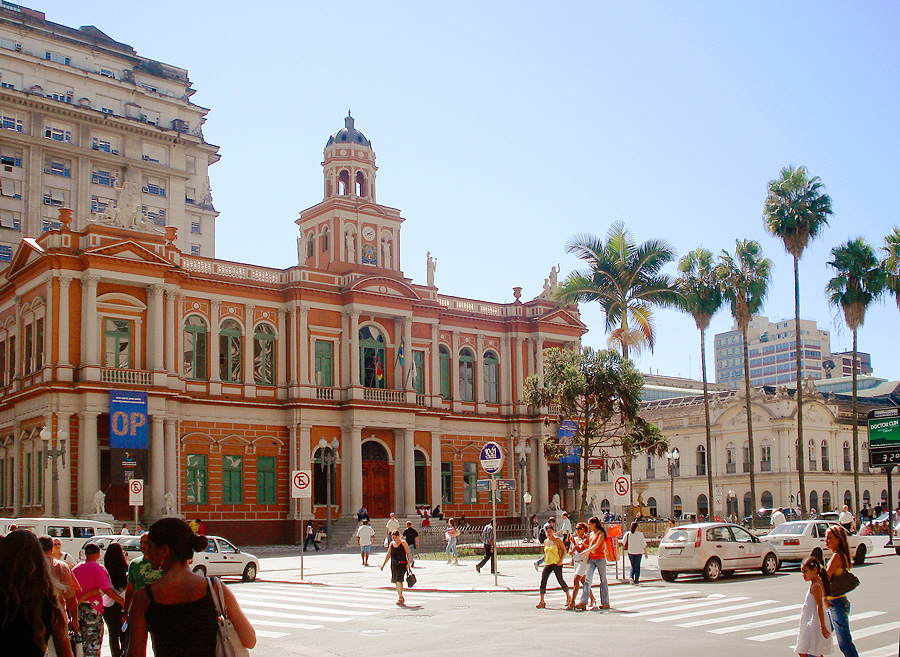

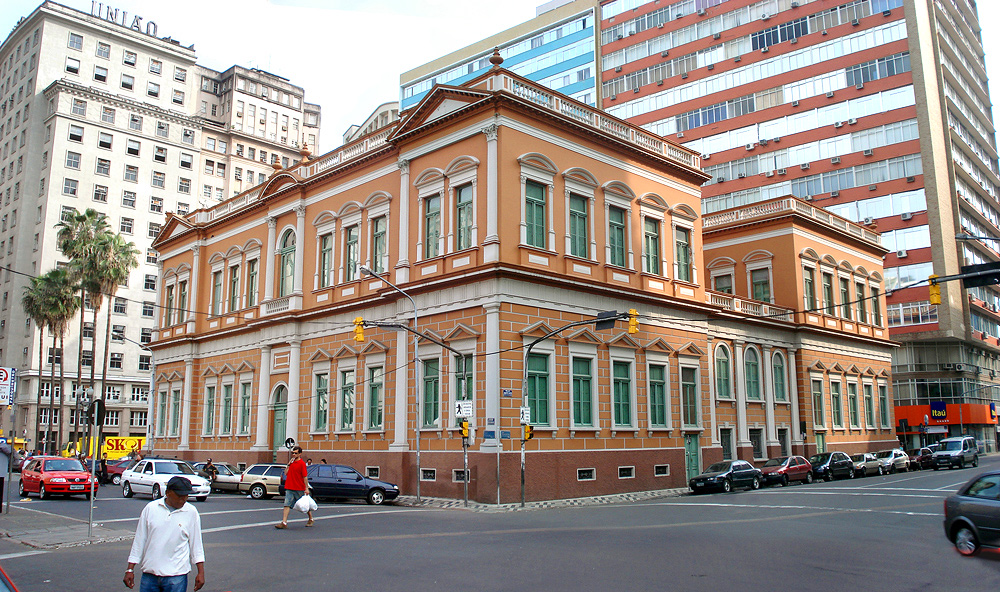

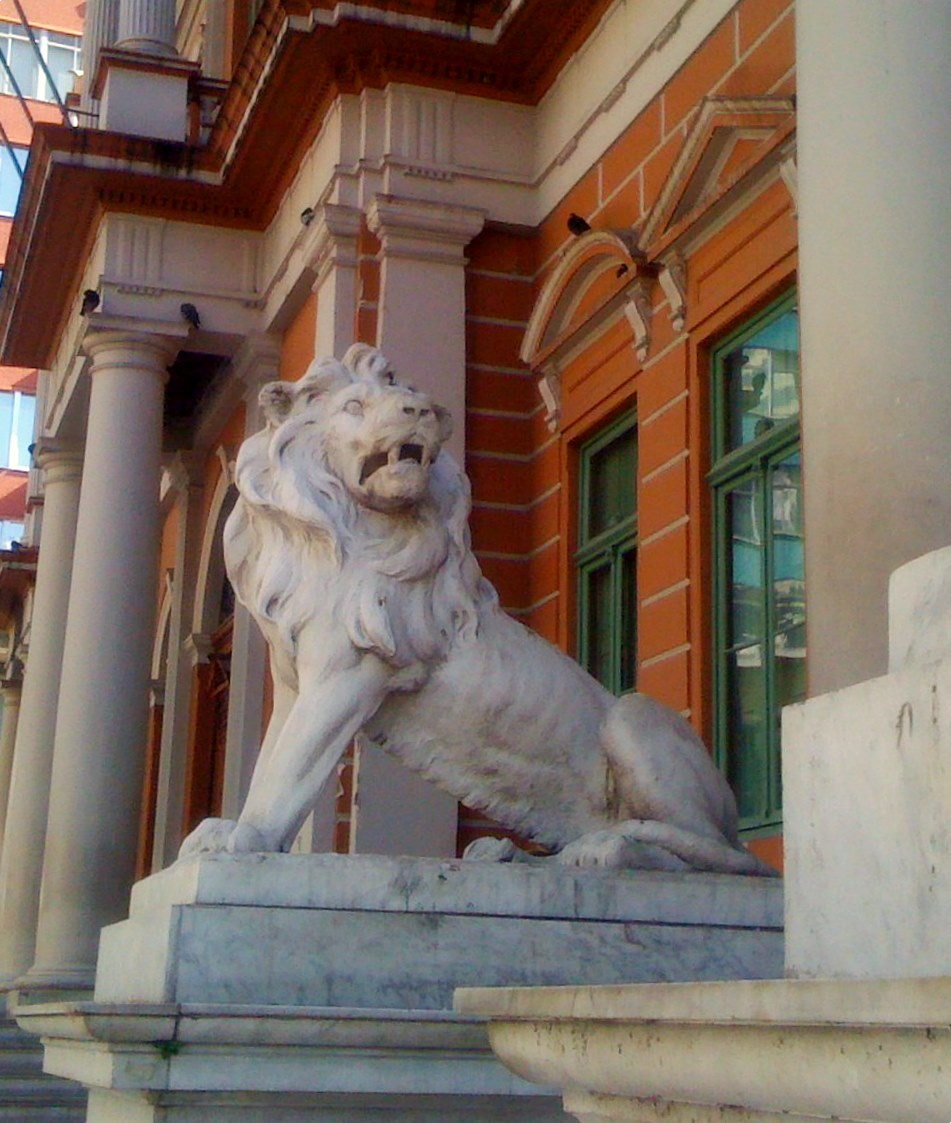

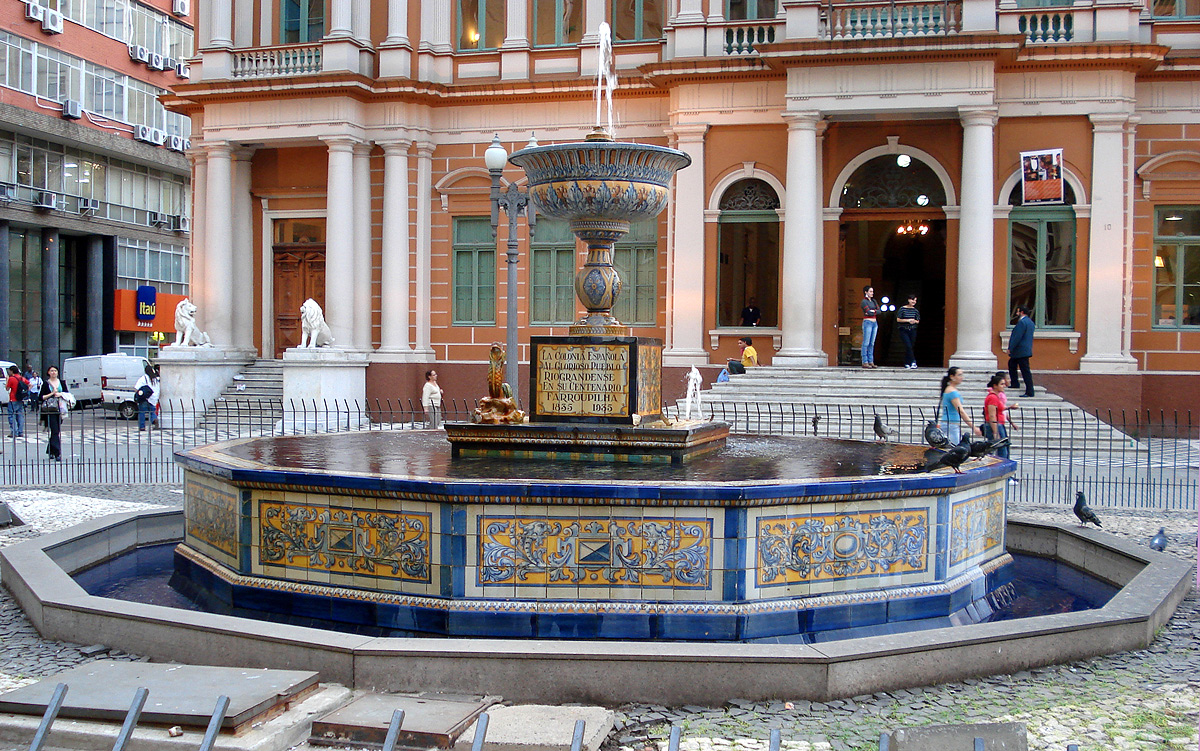

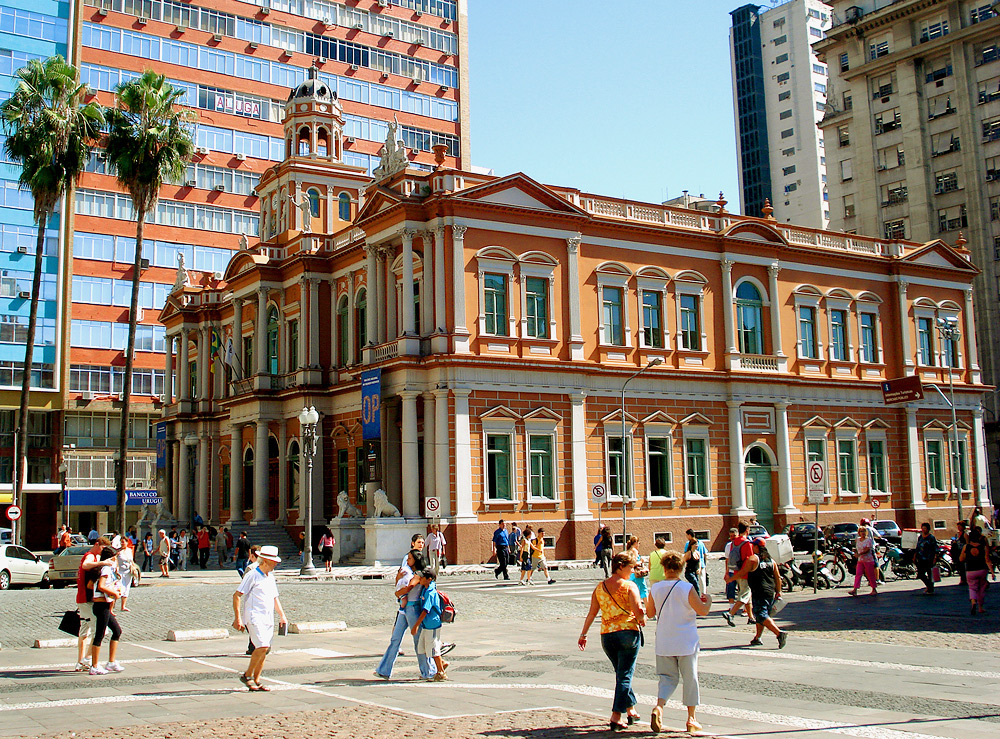
