= Mitchie Brusco =

American professional skateboarder

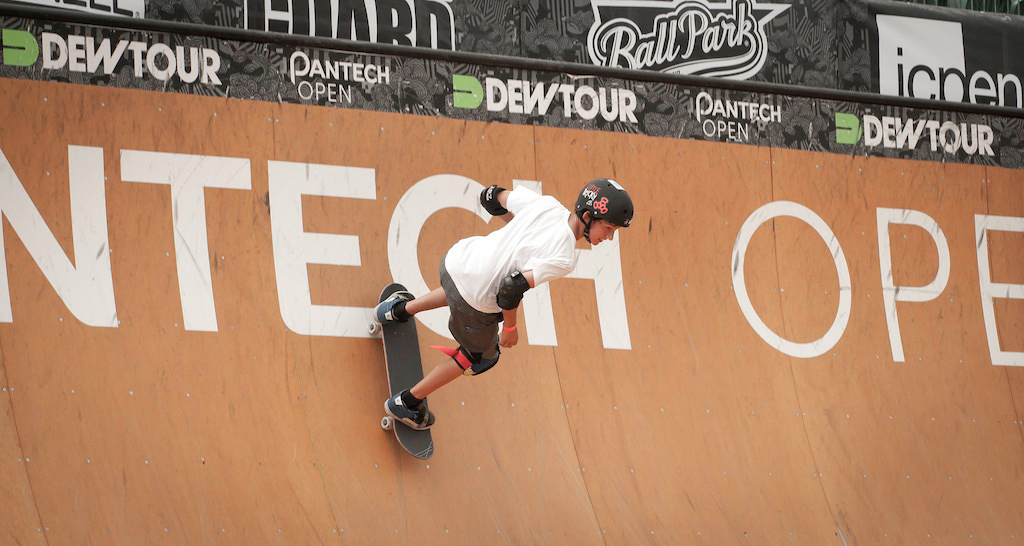

Personal information
- Full name: Mitchell Brusco
- Born: February 20, 1997 (age 29) Kirkland, Washington, U.S.
- Height: 6 ft 1 in (185 cm)

Sport
- Country: United States
- Sport: Skateboarding
Medal record
Men's skateboarding
Representing the United States
Summer X Games
Silver medal – second place	2012 Los Angeles	Skateboard Big Air
Silver medal – second place	2013 Barcelona	Skateboard Big Air
Bronze medal – third place	2013 Barcelona	Skateboard Vert
Bronze medal – third place	2013 Munich	Skateboard Vert
Bronze medal – third place	2014 Austin	Skateboard Vert
Bronze medal – third place	2017 Minneapolis	Skateboard Vert
Bronze medal – third place	2018 Minneapolis	Skateboard Vert
Gold medal – first place	2018 Minneapolis	Skateboard Big Air
Silver medal – second place	2019 Minneapolis	Skateboard Vert
Silver medal – second place	2019 Minneapolis	Skateboard Big Air
Bronze medal – third place	2021 Southern California	Skateboard Vert
Gold medal – first place	2022 Chiba	Skateboard Vert Best Trick

Mitchell "Mitchie" Brusco (born February 20, 1997) is an American pro skateboarder. Nicknamed "Little Tricky", he began skateboarding at the age of three in Kirkland, Washington, gaining popularity and recognition as a young talent in skateboarding. Brusco is the first skateboarder in history to successfully land a 1260, a skateboard trick in which the rider makes three-and-half revolutions in the air before landing, in competition. He also has held other records involving the 1080 and the 900.

== Life and career ==
Mitchie Brusco was born on February 20, 1997, to Mick and Jennifer Brusco. The fourth of five children, he began skateboarding at the age of three, when he saw a skateboard for sale at Target. Brusco's mother began taking him to skateparks after seeing him roll around the house on his skateboard. Impressed by his skills at his age, Brusco's first sponsorship was from a local skate shop called "Trickwood" who asked him to join their local skate team. It was also at the skate shop that Brusco received his nickname of "Little Tricky".

By the age of four, Brusco competed in more than 75 skateboarding competitions. In 2002, when he was five years old, Brusco won a regional competition for children 8-years-old and under. This title also secured him the chance to compete in the 2002 Gravity Games. The same year, his family hired an agent to represent him.

In July 2011, Brusco became the second skateboarder to land a 900 on a mega ramp. At the time, this also made 14-year-old Brusco the youngest person to successfully complete a 900, until Tom Schaar broke this record in October of that year at the age of 12. At the X Games XVIII, Brusco became the first X Games competitor to land a 900 in the Big Air skateboard competition.

On May 17, 2013, Brusco became the second skateboarder in history to successfully land a 1080 on the MegaRamp, the first to land the 1080 in the Big Air event at the X Games, and only the third person known to have ever performed the move. In 2018, at the big air competition at X Games Minneapolis, he landed his second 1080 and earned his first X Games gold medal.

In August 2019, Brusco became the first skateboarder to land a 1260 (three full and one-half revolutions) in a Big Air contest.

=== SkateIQ ===
In 2022, Brusco and Tyler Stroud launched SkateIQ, an online skateboarding coaching platform that offers paid subscription programs and individual video reviews.
