= Riachuelo Street (Porto Alegre) =

Road in center of Porto Alegre, Brazil

Riachuelo Street (Portuguese: Rua Riachuelo) is a public road in Porto Alegre, in the Brazilian state of Rio Grande do Sul. Located in the historic center of Porto Alegre, it starts at General Salustiano Street and ends at Doutor Flores Street, in front of the Count of Porto Alegre Square.

== History ==
Riachuelo Street is one of the oldest streets in the city, and it was laid out in the town’s first plan, drawn up by Captain Alexandre Montanha. From Ladeira Street (now General Câmara Street) to Arsenal Beach, it was known as Cotovelo (English: Elbow) Street due to its layout, which formed a large bend behind the São Pedro Theater. From Ladeira to Portão Square (now Conde de Porto Alegre Square), it was known as Ponte Street because of the bridge at the corner with Borges de Medeiros Avenue.

The section known as Ponte Street had serious flooding problems, so much so that in 1830 a councilor proposed that work be done on the streets that needed to be drained, to fill in those that required it, such as Poço Street and Ponte Street. To this end, he suggested that the provincial government use the labor of convicts. On Cotovelo Street, the biggest obstacle was the existence of a quarry at the corner of Clara Street (now João Manoel Street), which remained there for eleven years, from 1833 to 1844, when it was finally dismantled. In 1843, when the streets were mapped, the road was renamed Ponte Street. This name was changed in 1865 to Riachuelo Street, in honor of the Brazilian naval victory over the Paraguayan squadron in the naval battle of Riachuelo.

Riachuelo Street was home to several noble residences, including the first house in Porto Alegre to have glass windows, which caused great concern among the population, who were used to hiding the interiors of their homes. This house belonged to Manuel Marques de Sousa, the Count of Porto Alegre, and Francisco Pedro Buarque de Abreu, the Baron of Jacuí. In 1886, the União Telefônica was installed at the corner of General Câmara Street, where the public library building was later constructed.

The 1892 building statistics recorded the dense population of the street, typical of the central zone, totaling 349 buildings, 270 of which were single-story, 44 townhouses, and 35 semi-detached houses.

== Attractions ==
The attractions of Riachuelo Street include:

- Rocco Palace, located at the corner of Doutor Flores Street, is considered one of the most elegant buildings in Porto Alegre.
- The State Public Library building, is one of the greatest icons of positivist architecture under Borges de Medeiros.
- Solar Riachuelo, also known as Solar Coruja, is a century-old building erected in 1906, now a bar and art and culture space.
- The building at 933 Rua Riachuelo, is one of the rare remnants of colonial residential architecture with an eclectic façade in the city, dating from the last decades of the 19th century.
- Ferreira de Azevedo House, one of the few (if not the only) palaces remaining from the town’s first layout, still standing today.

== Gallery ==
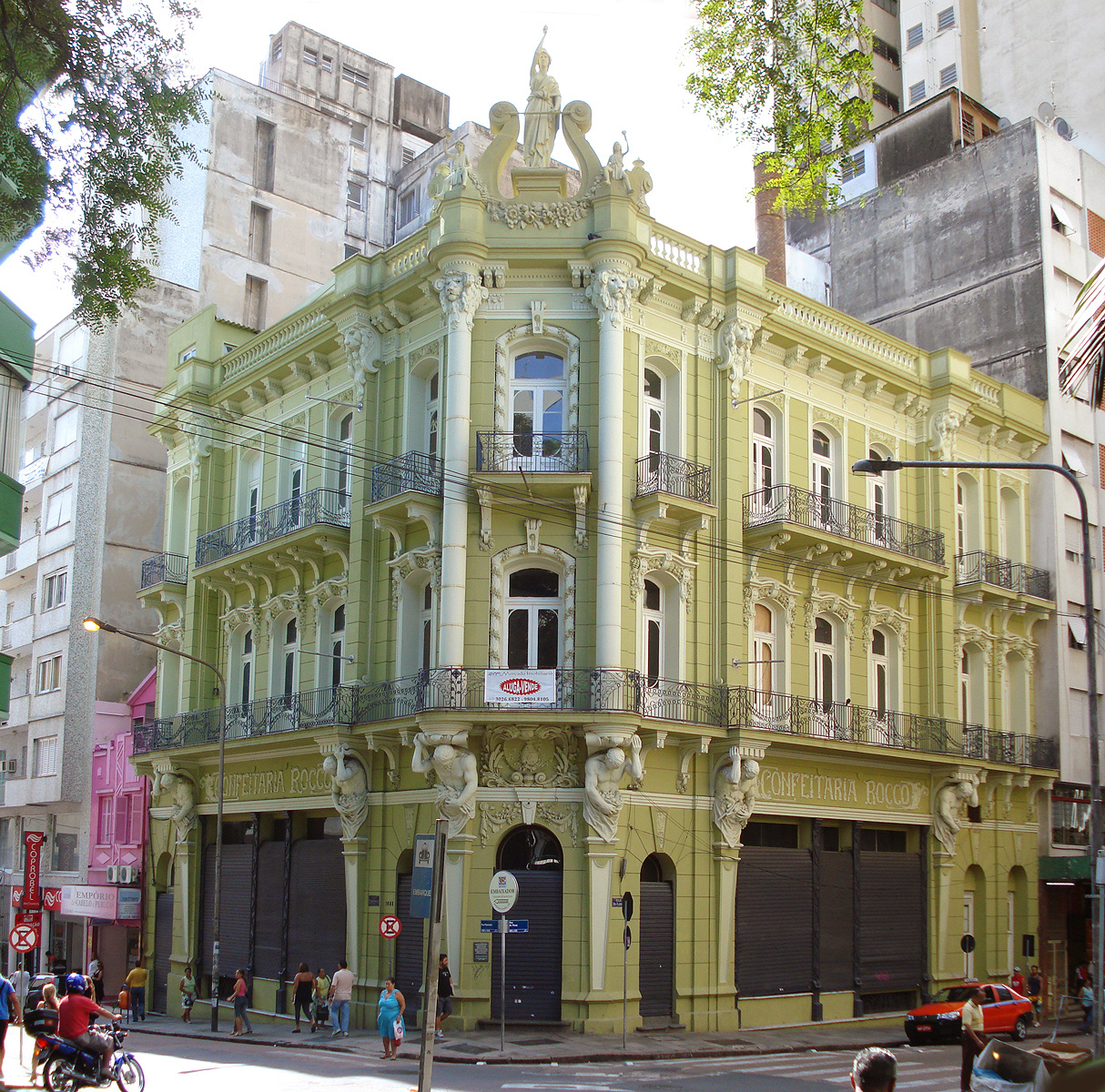
Palacete Rocco, located at 1618 Riachuelo Street, corner with Dr. Flores Street.

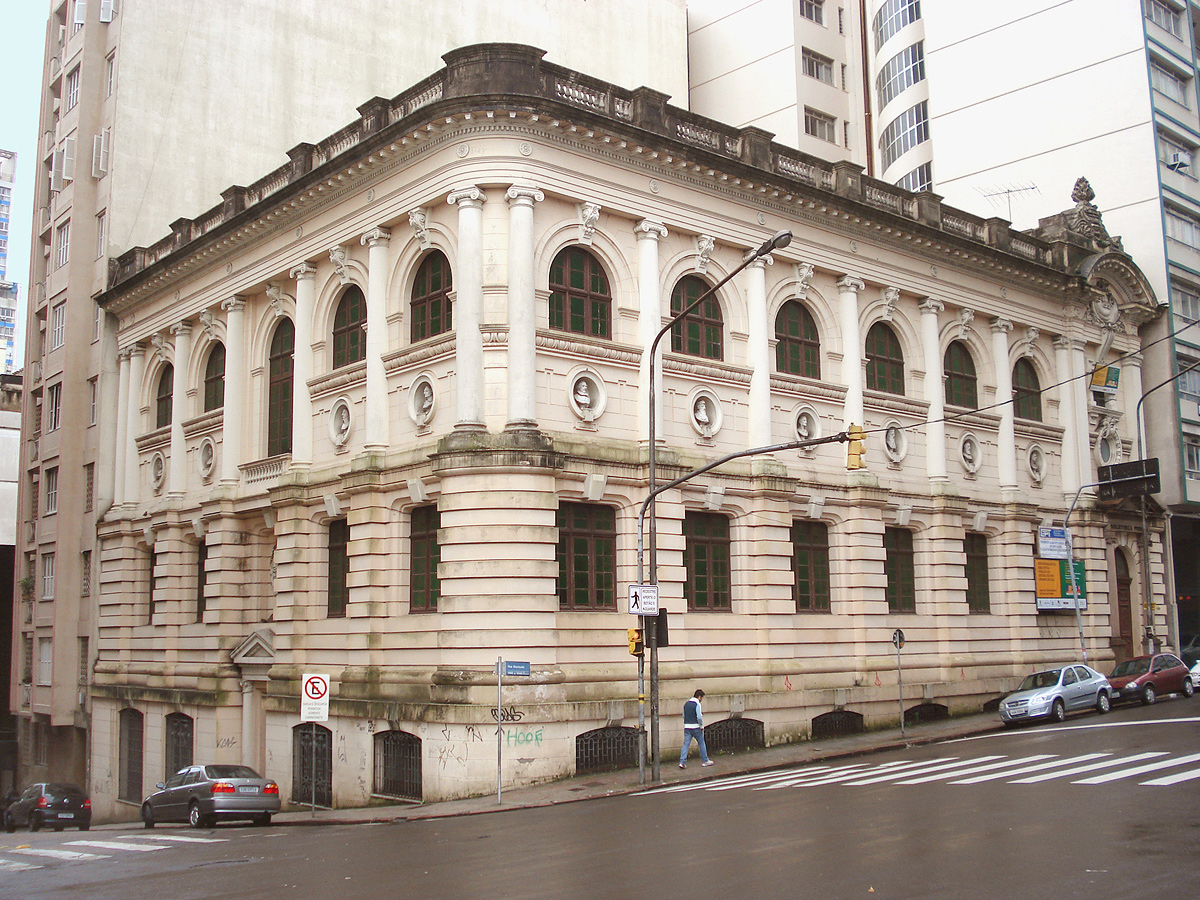
Public Library of Rio Grande do Sul, located at 1190 Riachuelo Street, corner with General Câmara Street.

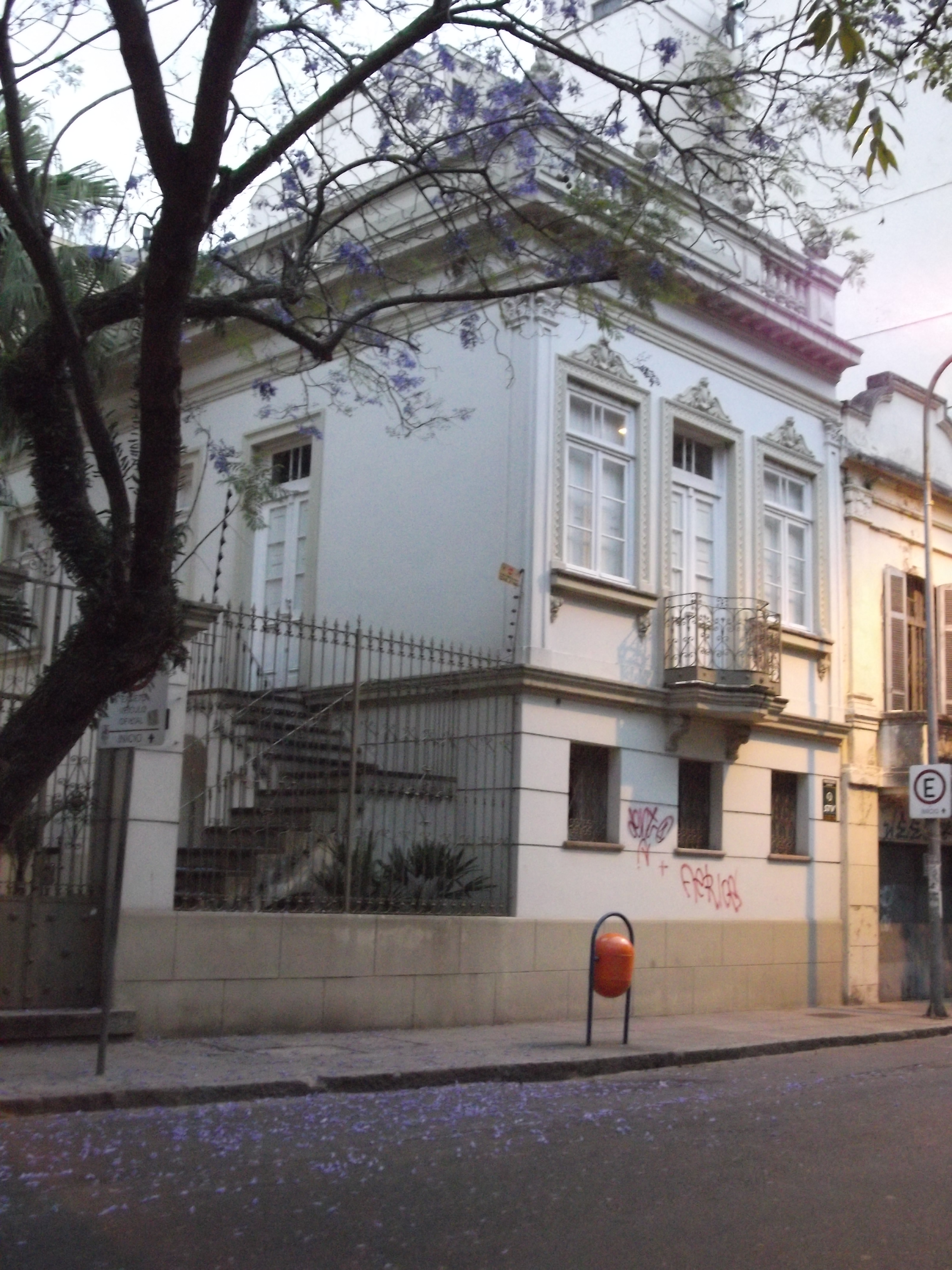
Solar Coruja, 525 Riachuelo Street.

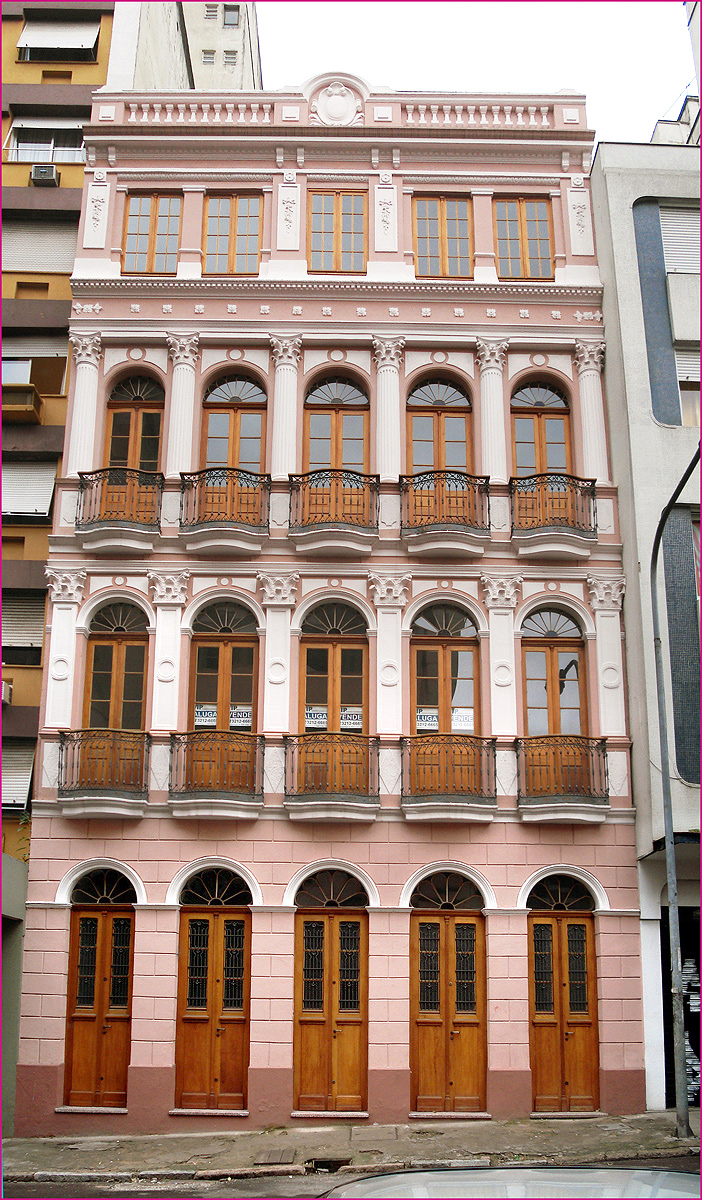
Facade of the building at 933 Riachuelo Street.

== See also ==
- Borges de Medeiros Avenue (Porto Alegre)
- São Pedro Theatre
