= Otávio Rocha Viaduct =

Viaduct in Brazil

Coordinates: 30°02′01″S 51°13′41″W

- Viaduto Otávio Rocha
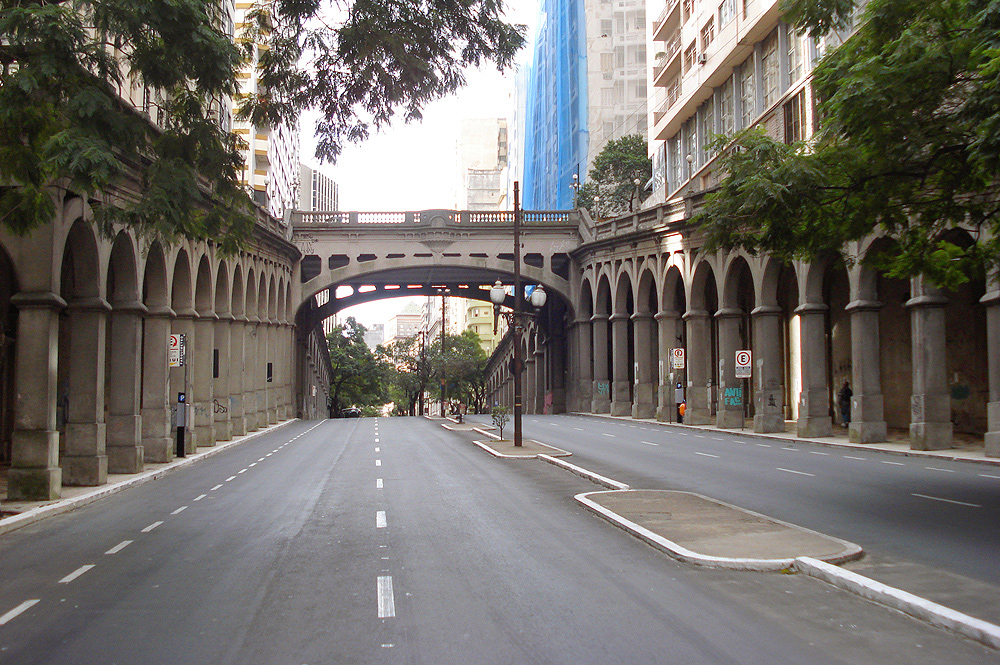
- Aspect of the Otávio Rocha Viaduct in 2008

General information
- Location: Porto Alegre, Rio Grande do Sul
- Completed: 1932

Design and construction
- Architects: Manoel Barbosa Assumpção Itaqui; Duilio Bernardi

The Otávio Rocha Viaduct is an outstanding engineering work in Porto Alegre, capital of the Brazilian state of Rio Grande do Sul. It is located in the city center, at the intersection of the Duque de Caxias Street and Borges de Medeiros Avenue.

== History ==
The origins of the viaduct date back to 1914, when the city's first general plan foresaw the opening of a street to connect the eastern, southern, and central zones of Porto Alegre, which until then were isolated by the so-called "morrinho". However, its construction was only approved in 1926, when the intendant Otávio Rocha, together with the state president, Borges de Medeiros, determined the effective opening of the current Borges de Medeiros Avenue. Such decision required a downgrade on the ground, interrupting the course of the Duque de Caxias Street and forcing the creation of an elevated road to reconstitute its passage.

In 1927, a project by engineers Manoel Barbosa Assumpção Itaqui and Duilio Bernardi was approved, and in the following year, the required expropriations began. A bidding process was opened for the construction, and the company Dyckerhoff & Widmann won. The work was concluded in 1932.

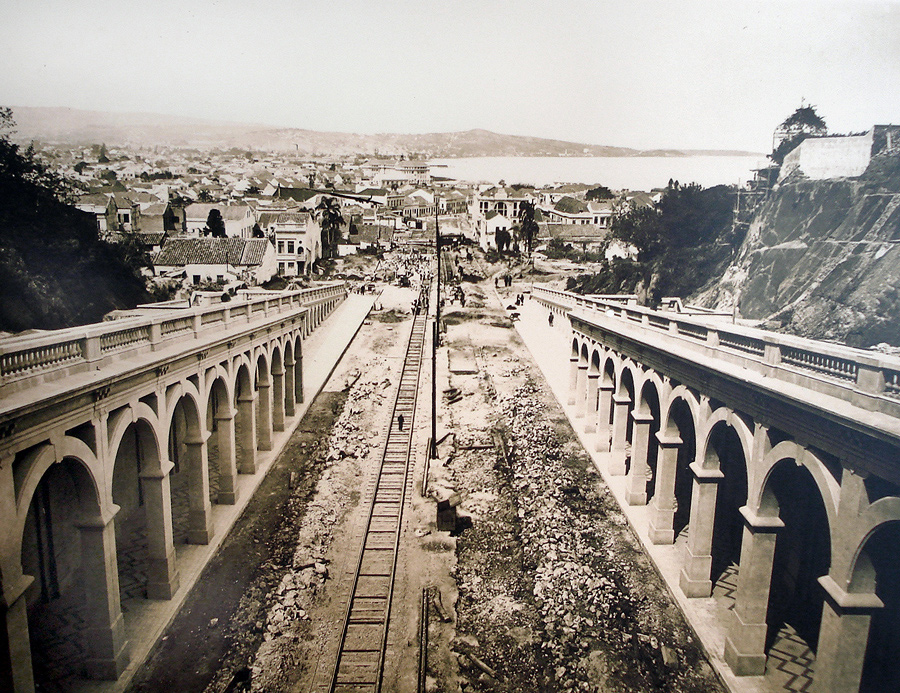
Opening of Borges de Medeiros Avenue and construction of the Otávio Rocha Viaduct. Photo from the 1920s from the Joaquim Felizardo Museum collection.

The viaduct is a reinforced concrete structure with three spans. In the center, at the level of the avenue, there are two transverse porticos with two large niches, where there are sculptural groups created by Alfred Adloff. On both sides of Borges Avenue, wide access stairways were erected up to the level of the viaduct, supported by large arches; small commercial establishments and sanitary facilities were installed underneath them. The parapets of the ramps and the viaduct have a decorative balustrade.

Each sidewalk is covered with cement mosaics and the coating is made of granite powder plaster, imitating perpend stone. Since its construction, the Otávio Rocha Viaduct has been an important landmark in Porto Alegre. Its architectural features, as well as its socio-cultural relevance, led the city to declare the structure a heritage site on October 31, 1988.

Between 2000 and 2001 it was completely recovered, and with the renovation, all 36 stores were revitalized, getting new floors, window frames, and electrical, hydraulic, and telephone installations. However, the viaduct still suffers from vandalism and depredation, besides the fact that the avenue is one of the streets in Porto Alegre with the highest number of robberies against pedestrians. In April 2026, the municipal government announced the completion of a restoration begun in December 2022, with expenditure reported at approximately R$18.7 million. The works reopened four internal staircases that had been closed since the 1980s and installed 342 LED lighting fixtures.

=== Law 10.541 of 2008 ===
After the enactment of Law No. 10,541, of September 19, 2008, the upper public space of the Otávio Rocha Viaduct was renamed Passeio das Quatro Estações (English: Four Seasons Sidewalk). Each of the four stairways is now identified on nameplates by a season of the year:

- Summer Sidewalk - starting on Jerônimo Coelho Street and ending on Duque de Caxias Street, right side of the Viaduct, north–south direction;
- Autumn Sidewalk - beginning at Jerônimo Coelho Street and ending at Duque de Caxias Street, left side of the Viaduct, north–south direction;
- Winter Sidewalk - starting on Duque de Caxias Street and ending on Coronel Fernando Machado Street, right side of the Viaduct, north–south direction;
- Spring Sidewalk - starting on Duque de Caxias Street and ending on Coronel Fernando Machado Street, left side of the Viaduct, north–south direction.

== Gallery ==
Arcades of the Verão walkway after the 2022–2026 restoration

Sculpture group by Alfred Adloff

Covered gallery with a hydraulic tile floor

== See also ==
- History of Porto Alegre
- Architecture of Porto Alegre
