= Sandro Dias =

Brazilian skateboarder (born 1975)

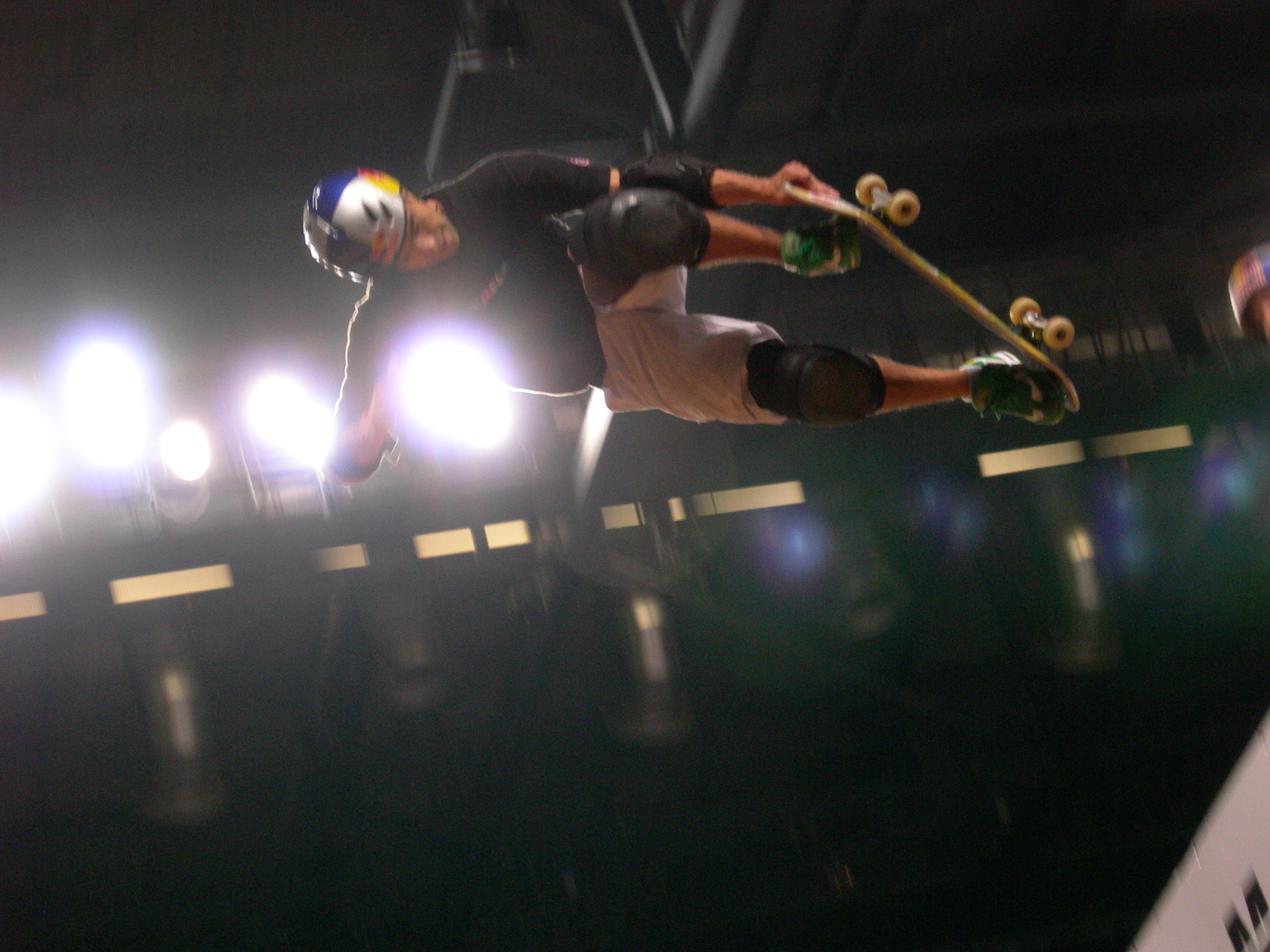

Personal information
- Nicknames: Mineirinho; King of the 540
- Born: 18 April 1975 (age 51) Santo André, São Paulo, Brazil
- Height: 5 ft 5 in (1.65 m)

Sport
- Sport: Skateboarding
Medal record
Summer X Games
Representing Brazil
Gold medal – first place	2006 Los Angeles	Vert
Gold medal – first place	2007 Los Angeles	Vert
Gold medal – first place	2004 Los Angeles	Vert Best Trick
Silver medal – second place	2002 Philadelphia	Vert Best Trick
Silver medal – second place	2003 Los Angeles	Vert Best Trick
Silver medal – second place	2013 Foz do Iguaçu	Vert
Silver medal – second place	2014 Austin	Vert
Bronze medal – third place	2005 Los Angeles	Vert
Bronze medal – third place	2000 San Francisco	Vert Doubles

Sandro Dias (born April 18, 1975), also known as Mineirinho, is a Brazilian professional vert skateboarder. He started skateboarding in 1986 and turned pro in 1995. Best known for his high alley oop air tricks and for being one of ten people confirmed to have pulled the 900. He won the gold medal at X Games 12 in Skateboard Vert. He is sponsored by Red Bull, Oakley, and Positiv Skateboards. He won the world vert skateboarding titles in 2003, 2004, 2005, 2006, and 2007.

In 2011, Dias captured his sixth world vert skateboarding title. He beat out his close friend and teammate 8-time champion Andy Macdonald by only 50 championship points.

On 25 September 2025, during an event organized by Red Bull, Dias skated down the Fernando Ferrari Administrative Center, a government building shaped like a quarter pipe in Porto Alegre, Rio Grande do Sul, breaking two world records in skateboarding: highest drop-in ever and the fastest speed reached on a standard skateboard (103 km/h, approximately 64 mph). Starting at a height of 55 meters, he gradually dropped in at 60, 65 and finally 70 meters. Guinness World Records representatives were present at the time of the event to verify the record breaking.
