= Sluggo Boyce =

Canadian skateboarder and snowboarder

Robert Doucet Boyce, known as Sluggo, is a professional skateboarder, snowboarder, break-dancer, gymnast, stuntman, and businessman from Vancouver, British Columbia.

== Early life ==
Sluggo was born in Victoria, British Columbia where he started as a gymnast winning the Western Canadian Championships at age 13. He also did breakdancing and won several competitions and placed 5th in a North American break-dance contest.

== Skateboarding career ==
Boyce began his skateboard career at the age of 16 on the advice of a classmate. A friend of his suggested the name 'Sluggo' because of his supposed resemblance to the character in the comic strip Nancy. Sluggo honed his vertical skateboard skills at the Richmond Skate Ranch, owned by Kevin Harris, a local pro skater for Powell Peralta. This is where he would also meet his future crew, best friends, and business partners Colin McKay, and Moses Itkonen. The crew came to be known as the "Red Dragons".

Best known for his skateboarding, Sluggo was also the first person to perform a back flip to fakie on a vertical skate ramp. Sluggo shares ownership of a skateboarding distribution company, Centre Distribution, and oversees the day-to-day operations of RDS Skate Supply and Red Dragon Apparel.

Sluggo caught the eye of Stacey Peralta, director of the Dog-town documentary, and owner of Powell Peralta Skateboards. Stacey introduced Sluggo to Henry Hester, a skateboard legend from Southern California who ran G&S. Sluggo rode for G&S from 1988 till 1990. Later Sluggo would ride for Real Skateboards owned by Tommy Guererro and Jim Thiebaud from Peralta’s world famous "Bones Brigade".

Sluggo turned pro in 1991 and traveled to the World Championships in Munster, Germany and competed for the first time against his childhood heroes Chris Miller, Tony Hawk and a long list of highly regarded veteran skaters. Sluggo placed 5th in his first international competition.

Sluggo retired from snowboarding professionally in 2000 but continued to skateboard professionally until 2004. He came out of retirement briefly to compete in the Canadian Half-Pipe Championship in March 2005 and won the event.

=== Snowboarding ===
In 1992, Sluggo’s brother Dave Boyce introduced him to snowboarding, and he quickly became successful in the sport.

== Stunt performer ==
Sluggo is now a full UBCP union stunt performer working within the Canadian movie industry. He started his stunt career doubling Dean Cain in a Wesley Snipes production, Future Sport. Sluggo has over 60 TV and feature credits to his name either acting or stunting. His daughter Araya boyce has recently started pursuing an acting career and has already featured in an independent film about girl skaters in the 90s.

Boyce was skate coordinator on the NBC TV series Sk8.

== Personal life ==
Sluggo has two children, Liam and Araya.
