= Mega ramp =

Large vert ramp structure

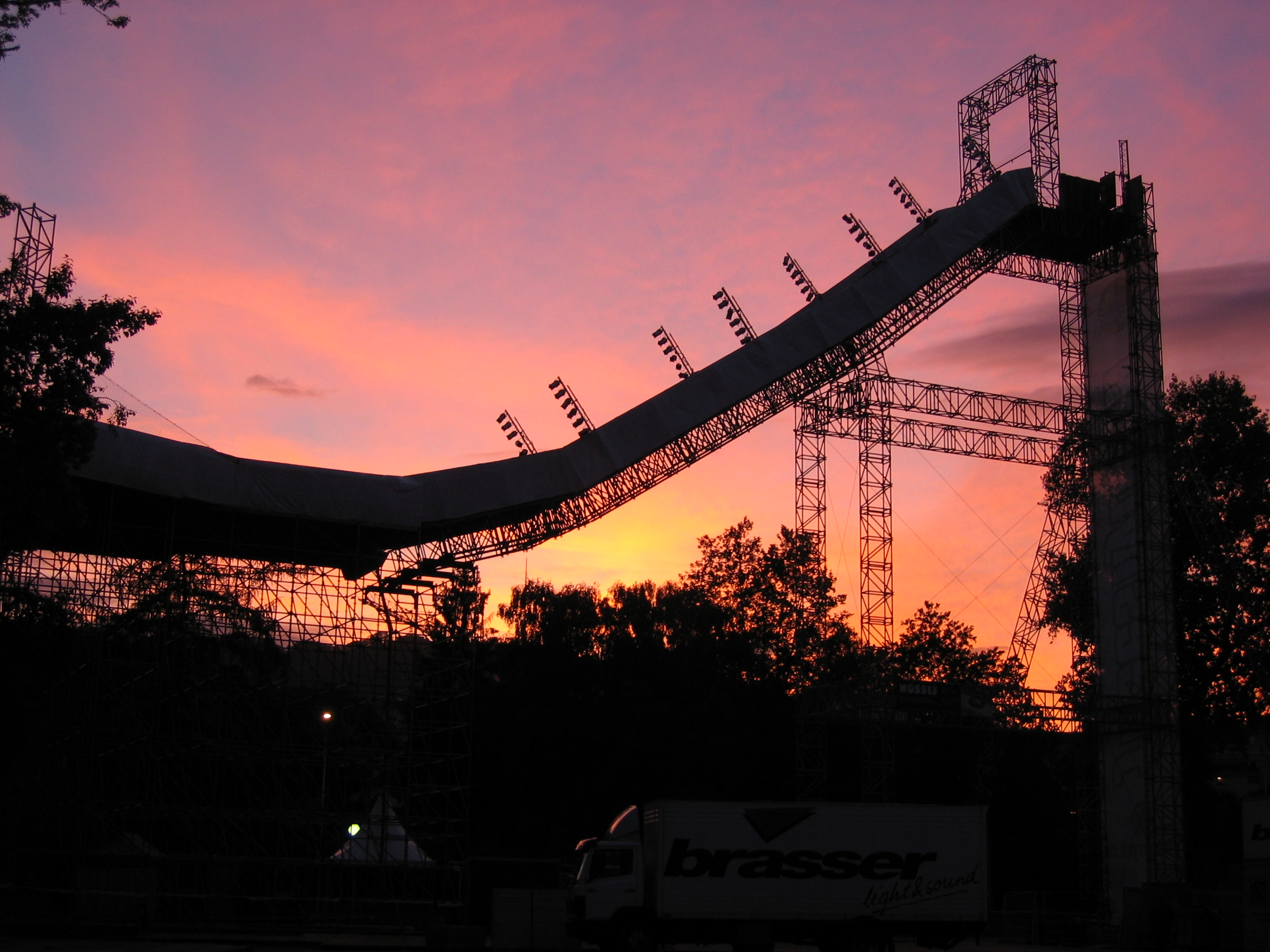
The Big Air event at freestyle.ch at sunset, 2004.

A mega ramp, or megaramp, is a large vert ramp structure, often used in skateboarding and freestyle BMX. First built in the 1990s and 2000s, megaramps are twice or more the size of earlier vert ramps.

MegaRamp (styled with title caps and without a space) is the name of a mega ramp event organization and promotion company.

== Structure ==
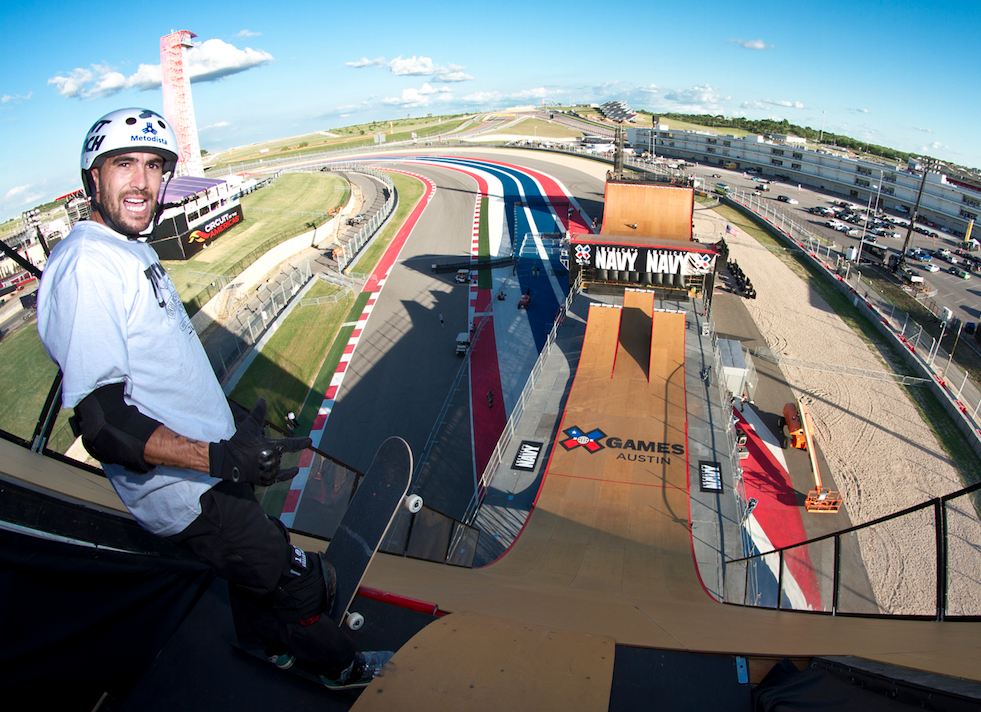
Edgard Pereira standing at the top of a mega ramp at X Games Austin 2015

Contemporary structures are generally constructed of metal scaffold with a wood surface topped with Skatelite, and consist of two or three sections. The most common ramp setup, used as well by MegaRamp, is a sequence of three mega ramp sections; a roll-in, a gap jump, and a vert quarter pipe. Vert half-pipe mega ramps have been built, but they are uncommon.

The roll-in section consists of a single or multiple roll-ins that drop from 12m (40') or higher up. The roll-in allows athletes to gain the speed needed to tackle the other sections of the ramp.

The second section can be a quarter pipe, but is more often a gap jump with a distance of 7.5m (25') to 21m (70') between the launch section and the landing section, which is sloped forward to decrease the impact.

The third section is almost invariably a quarter pipe. The quarter pipes can be 5.4m (18') or greater in height and serve as either a speed brake, or as another launch point from which the athlete sails directly vertical into the air off the top lip of the ramp, before falling back down and re-landing on the quarter pipe.

Other additions and modifications have been tried on mega ramps, such as the tall flatbox with a rainbow rail that was added to the Point X mega ramp.

The total length of these structures varies from about 60m (200') to 108m (360').

== History ==
The first giant ramp structure was conceived and built by BMX freestyler Mathew "Mat" Hoffman in his Oklahoma home backyard between 1991 and 1992. It was a single 6.3m (21') tall vert quarter pipe ramp. Lacking a roll-in ramp, Hoffman would be towed in at speed by a motorcycle. In 1992, Hoffman set the Freestyle BMX air record at about 7.05m (23.5'). Hoffman later built a full vert half-pipe ramp with similar dimensions, including a 12m high roll-in ramp, from the roof of his warehouse.

Danny Way thought up the now-common "MegaRamp" setup: roll-in ramp, gap jump, and the final quarter pipe ramp. This setup was first seen at Point X Camp in the OP King Of Skate pay-per-view special in 2002. It was dubbed the MegaRamp in the 2003 DC Shoes video release "The DC Video", where Way set two world records in a single run: longest jump (75 ft) and highest air (23.5 ft).

In 2005, Way used a megaramp, the largest ramp structure ever built, to jump the Great Wall of China and became the first person to jump the wall without the help of a motor vehicle and land successfully. After one practice attempt, he landed the jump across the gap over the Wall four times in front of a crowd of Chinese dignitaries and officials, along with his family, friends, and thousands of locals.

In 2012, Tom Schaar used a mega ramp to land the first 1080, breaking Tony Hawk’s record 900 (landed on a vert ramp) set in 1999.

In August 2019, Mitchie Brusco used a mega ramp to land the first 1260, breaking Schaar’s record.

Professional skateboarder Bob Burnquist has a 60-foot tall megaramp.

== MegaRamp at the X Games ==
The MegaRamp has been employed in the X Games' "Big Air" event since 2004 for skateboard and 2006 for BMX. In 2007, Jake Brown fell 45 feet to the bottom of the ramp.

== See also ==
- Vert ramp
- Mini ramp
- Half-pipe
- Quarter pipe
