= Dropping in =

Skateboarding trick

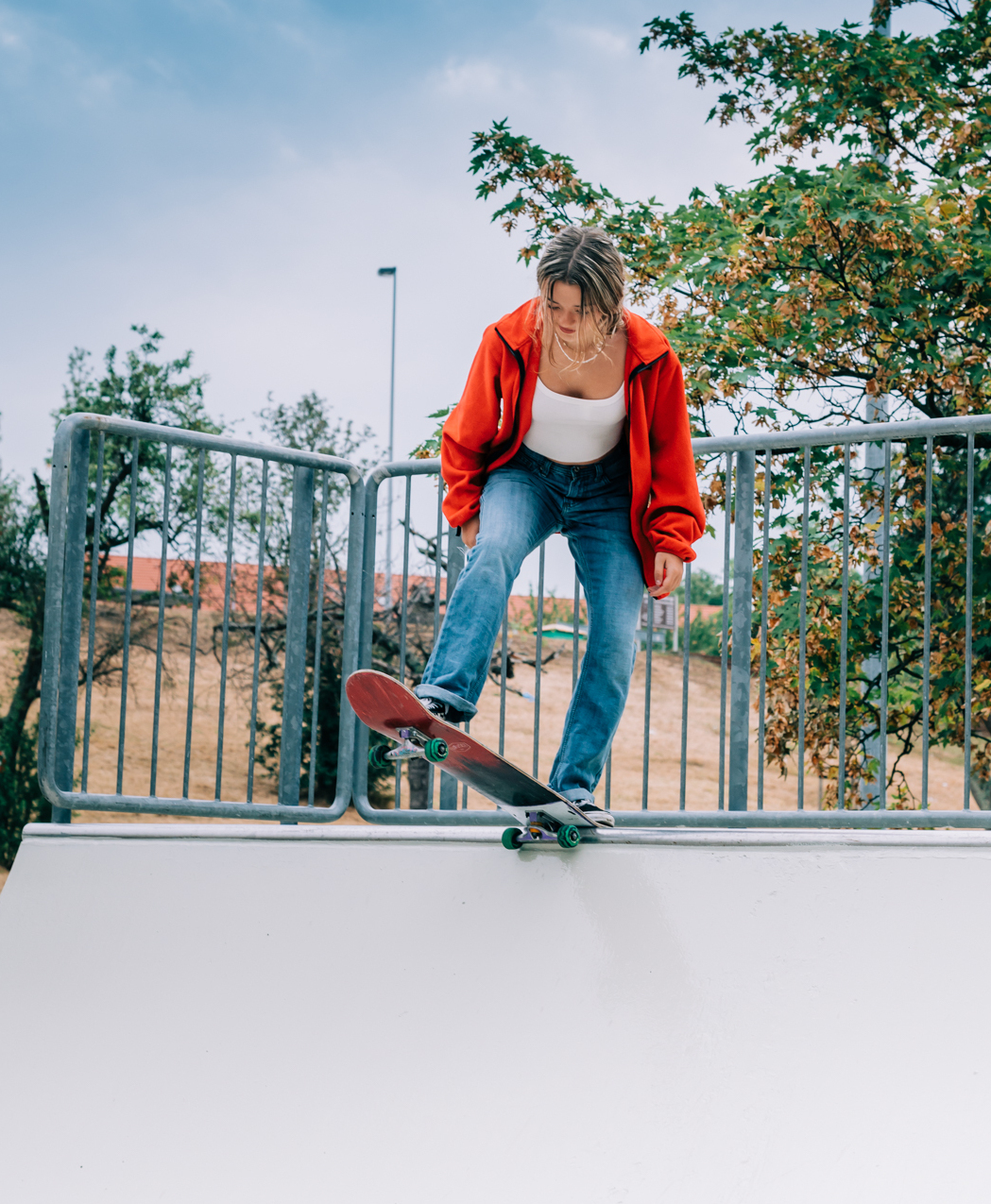
A girl positioning herself to perform a dropping in

Dropping in is a skateboarding trick with which a skateboarder starts skating a half-pipe by dropping into it from the coping instead of starting from the bottom and pumping gradually for more speed. When a skateboarder drops in, they use their gravitational potential energy to gain initial velocity, allowing the skater to skate longer before exhausting themselves and thus to take more runs.

When a skateboarder drops in, they stand on the deck of a half-pipe, put their back foot on the tail of the skateboard, and push it so that the back wheels just roll over the coping into a position like in a tail stall. They then put their front foot on the deck, which now hangs over the half-pipe, lean forward, and start skating the half-pipe.

The highest drop-in ever was performed on 25 September 2025, during an event organized by Red Bull, by the Brazilian professional vert skateboarder Sandro Dias. He skated down the Fernando Ferrari Administrative Center, a government building shaped like a quarter pipe in Porto Alegre, Rio Grande do Sul, breaking not only the world record in the highest drop-in ever, but also the fastest speed reached on a standard skateboard (103 km/h, approximately 64 mph). Starting at a height of 55 meters, he gradually dropped in at 60, 65 and finally 70 meters. Guinness World Records representatives were present at the time of the event to verify the record breaking.
