= Tom Schaar =

American professional skateboarder (born 1999)

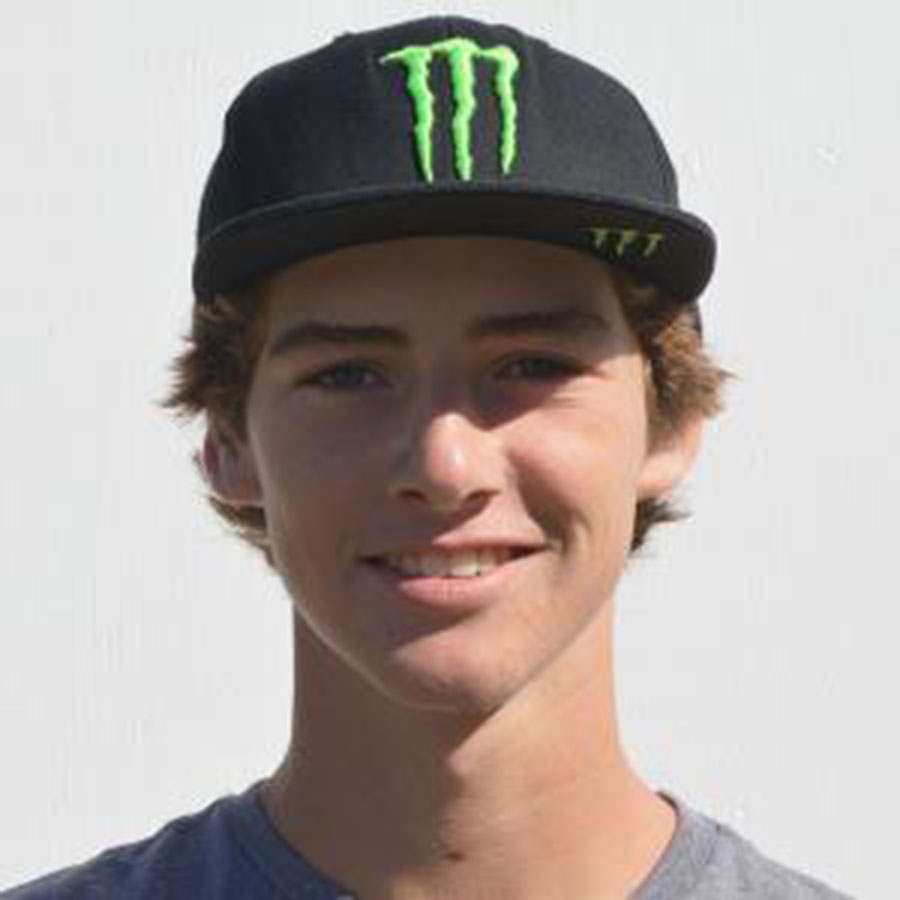
- Schaar in 2017

Personal information
- Born: September 14, 1999 (age 26) Malibu, California, U.S.
- Height: 6 ft 1 in (185 cm)

Sport
- Country: United States
- Sport: Skateboarding
- Rank: 2nd
Medal record
Men's skateboarding
Representing the United States
Olympic Games
Silver medal – second place	2024 Paris	Park
World Championships
Silver medal – second place	2026 Rome	Park
Bronze medal – third place	2026 São Paulo	Park
X Games
Gold medal – first place	2012 Shanghai	Mega 2.0
Gold medal – first place	2014 Austin	Big air
Gold medal – first place	2024 Ventura	Vert
Gold medal – first place	2024 Chiba	Park
Gold medal – first place	2025 Osaka	Park
Silver medal – second place	2013 Los Angeles	Big air
Silver medal – second place	2017 Minneapolis	Park
Silver medal – second place	2017 Minneapolis	Big air
Silver medal – second place	2023 Chiba	Vert
Silver medal – second place	2026 Chiba	Park
Bronze medal – third place	2013 Munich	Big air
Bronze medal – third place	2015 Austin	Big air
Bronze medal – third place	2015 Austin	Big air doubles
Bronze medal – third place	2018 Minneapolis	Park
Bronze medal – third place	2023 California	Park
Bronze medal – third place	2023 California	Vert Best Trick
Bronze medal – third place	2024 Chiba	Vert
Bronze medal – third place	2025 Osaka	Vert
Bronze medal – third place	2025 Salt Lake City	Park
Bronze medal – third place	2026 Sacramento	Park
Bronze medal – third place	2026 Sacramento	Vert

Tom Schaar (/ʃɑːr/ SHAR; born September 14, 1999) is an American professional skateboarder. Schaar has been a member of Team USA since 2019 and won the silver medal in the men's park skateboarding competition at the 2024 Summer Olympics in Paris, France. He was the first skateboarder to land a 1080 and was the youngest X Games gold medalist after completing the first 1080 in a competition at the 2012 Asia X Games in Shanghai; Forbes listed Schaar to their 2020 30 Under 30 Sports category highlighting the next generation of Sports talent.

== Career ==
In addition to being the youngest X Games gold medalist, Schaar is also the youngest Dew Tour champion, the youngest and five-time Vans Pool Party champion, and the youngest "Big Air" gold medalist at the Austin X Games. Before turning 18 years old, Schaar was a nine-time X Games Medalist with fifteen medals in total from attending 16 X games. On March 20, 2019, Schaar was named to the first-ever USA Skateboarding National Team. In 2025, Schaar received his first nomination for Thrasher's Skater of the Year award.

== Milestones ==
In October 2011, at 12 years old, Schaar became the 8th person in history to land a 900 on a skateboard.

In September 2016, Schaar became the first person in history to land a Stalefish 900 on a skateboard.

In 2006, Shaun White unsuccessfully attempted the 1080 on 21 occasions at that year's X Games and 29 occasions the year before. At age 6, Schaar had watched White's 2006 attempts from the stands. In March 2012, at the age of 12, Schaar landed the first 1080 on a skateboard after four previous (unsuccessful) attempts. Schaar commented to ESPN, "It was the hardest trick I've ever done, but it was easier than I thought.". He completed the feat on a mega ramp.

At the Asian X Games in 2012, he won skate Mini Mega by landing the 1080, and became the first to land a 1080 on a skateboard in a competition and the youngest ever to win an X Games gold medal at the age of 12.

== Training ==
Schaar performs exercises that focus on boosting his strength, lower body power, and core strength while attempting to improve his flexibility and mobility.

== Sponsors ==
Schaar's main sponsors are Birdhouse Skateboards, New Balance, and Monster Energy.

== Competition History ==
- 3rd in 2026 X Games League Sacramento, California - Vert
- 3rd in 2026 X Games League Sacramento, California - Park
- 2nd in 2026 World Skate Tour Skateboarding World Cup Rome - Men's Park
- 3rd in 2025 World Skate Tour Skateboarding World Championships São Paulo - Men's Park
- 1st in 2025 Rockstar Energy Open - Men's Park
- 3rd in 2025 X Games Salt Lake City, Utah - Park
- 1st in 2025 X Games Osaka, Japan - Park
- 3rd in 2025 X Games Osaka, Japan - Vert
- 1st in 2025 Vans Pool Party Pros Division
- 1st in 2024 X Games Chiba, Japan - Park
- 3rd in 2024 X Games Chiba, Japan - Vert
- 2nd in 2024 Olympic Summer Games Paris, France - Olympic Summer Games
- 1st in 2024 X Games Ventura, California - Vert
- 2nd in 2024 World Skate Budapest, Hungary - World Skate Park
- 2nd in 2023 World Skate San Juan, Argentina - World Skate Park
- 2nd in 2023 X Games Chiba, Japan - Vert
- 3rd in 2023 Vert Attack Malmö, Sweden - Pro Open
- 5th in 2023 World Skate Sharjah, UAE - Park 2022 World Championships
- 4th in 2021 X Games Vista, CA Summer Skateboard Park
- 4th in 2019 X Games Minneapolis Skateboard Park
- 1st in 2019 Vans Pool Party Pros Division
- 3rd in 2018 Vans Park Series Suzhou
- 3rd in 2018 X Games Minneapolis Skateboard Park
- 1st in 2018 Vans Park Series São Paulo
- 1st in 2018 Vans Pool Party Pros Division
- 2nd in 2018 Air & Style LA Skateboard Best Trick
- 3rd in 2018 Air & Style LA Skateboard Park
- 3rd in 2018 Bowl-A-Rama Bondi Beach
- 2nd in 2017 X Games Minneapolis Skateboard Park
- 2nd in 2017 X Games Minneapolis Skateboard Big Air
- 1st in 2017 Vans Pool Party Pros Division
- 2nd in 2017 Bowl-A-Rama Bondi Beach
- 3rd in 2017 Vans Park Series Shanghai
- 1st in 2017 Vans Park Series Huntington Beach
- 3rd in 2017 Vans Park Series Vancouver
- 2nd in 2017 Vans Park Series Malmö
- 4th in 2017 Vans Park Series São Paulo
- 1st in 2017 Vans Park Series Sydney
- 4th in 2016 Vans Park Series Huntington Beach
- 5th in 2016 Vans Park Series Floripa
- 6th in 2016 Vans Park Series Melbourne
- 5th in 2016 X Games Austin Skateboard Park
- 3rd in 2016 Bowl-A-Rama Bondi Beach
- 3rd in 2015 X Games Austin Big Air Doubles, partnered with Zack Warden
- 3rd in 2015 X Games Austin Skateboard Big Air
- 1st in 2015 Vans Pool Party Pros Division
- 1st in 2014 X Games Austin Skateboard Big Air
- 2nd in 2014 Dew Tour Skateboard Bowl Ocean City Maryland
- 4th in 2014 Van Doren Invitational Vancouver Skateboard Park
- 2nd in 2013 X Games Los Angeles Skateboard Big Air
- 3rd in 2013 X Games Munich Skateboard Big Air
- 6th in 2013 X Games Munich Skateboard Vert
- 4th in 2013 Dew Tour Skateboard Bowl Ocean City Maryland
- 4th in 2013 X Games Barcelona Skateboard Big Air
- 9th in 2013 X Games Barcelona Skateboard Park
- 5th in 2013 Vans Pool Party Pros Division
- 4th in 2013 X Games Foz do Iguaçu Skateboard Big Air
- 6th in 2013 X Games Foz do Iguaçu Skateboard Vert
- 1st in 2012 Dew Tour Skateboard Mega 2.0 Ocean City Maryland
- 5th in 2012 Dew Tour Skateboard Bowl Ocean City Maryland
- 6th in 2012 X Games Los Angeles Skateboard Big Air
- 7th in 2012 X Games Los Angeles Skateboard Vert
- 1st in 2012 X Games Shanghai Skateboard Mega 2.0
- 4th in 2012 X Games Shanghai Skateboard Vert

== Records ==
Year	Record	Where	Notes
October 2011	900	MegaRamp Woodward West, Tehachapi, California	
March 2012	1080	MegaRamp Woodward West, Tehachapi, California	5th attempt Guinness World Record holder
April 2012	1080 in competition	2012 X Games Asia	
April 2012	The youngest competitor ever to win an X Games gold medal, until July 2021. Guinness World Record	2012 X Games Asia	
