= Borges de Medeiros Avenue (Porto Alegre) =

Avenue in Rio Grande do Sul, Brazil

Coordinates: 30.0434°S 51.2289°W

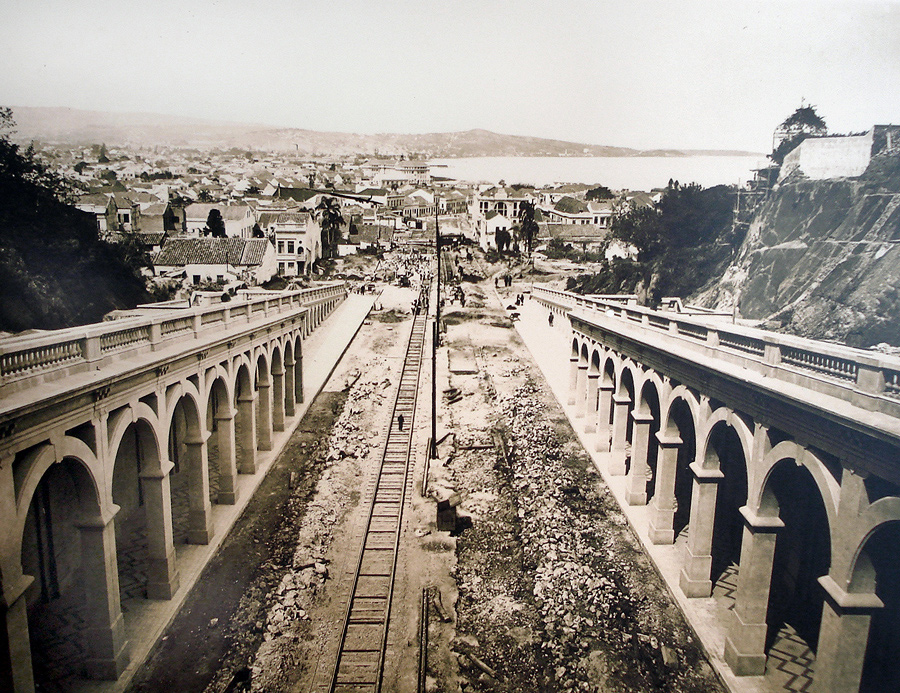
Opening of the avenue and construction of the Otávio Rocha Viaduct.

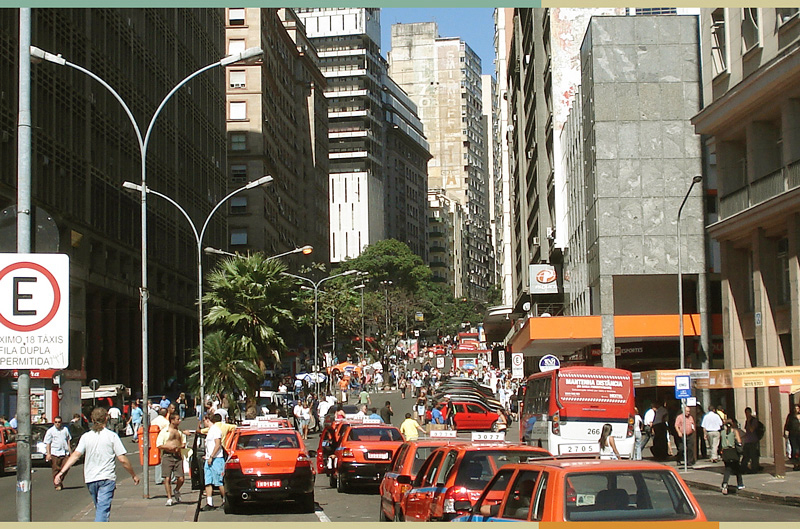
Initial stretch of Borges de Medeiros Avenue.

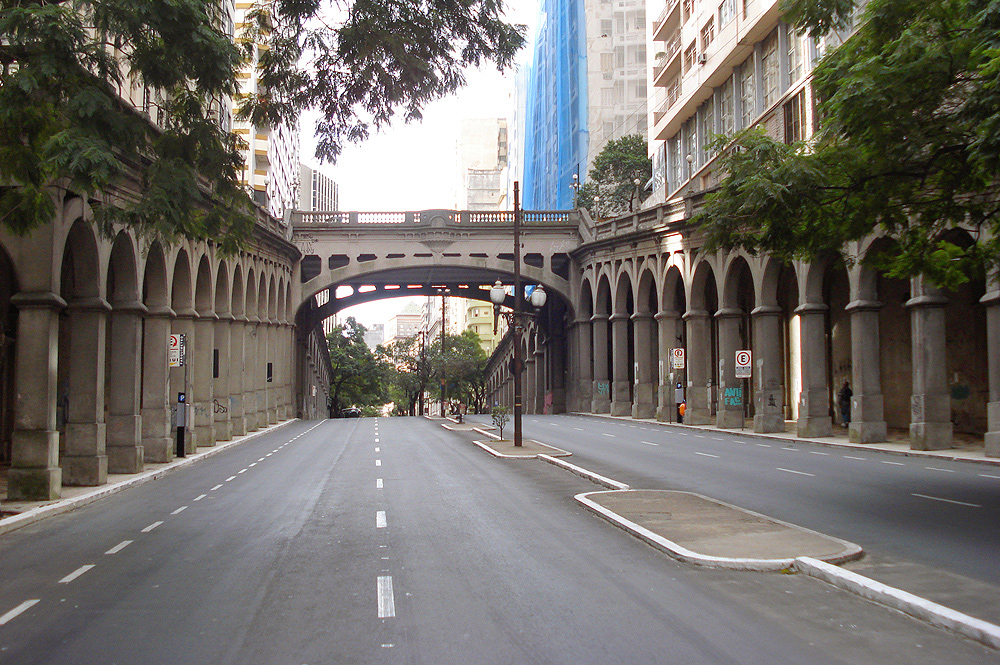
Otávio Rocha Viaduct.

Borges de Medeiros Avenue (Portuguese: Avenida Borges de Medeiros) is an arterial road located in the Brazilian city of Porto Alegre, capital of the state of Rio Grande do Sul. It includes landmarks such as the Otávio Rocha Viaduct and the Cine Theatro Capitólio. The intersection with Andradas Street forms the Democratic Corner, an established meeting point for rallies and popular demonstrations of different kinds.

== History ==
The origins of Borges de Medeiros Avenue are ancient. Documents dating back to 1830 from the City Council mention Beco do Poço, a path that connected the current Riachuelo and Duque de Caxias streets. In the middle of the 19th century, there were two sections: Beco do Freitas, which ran from Riachuelo Street to General Andrade Neves Street, and Beco do Meireles, which extended beyond Duque de Caxias Street.

On October 30, 1871, the City Council merged the three designations and named the entire route General Paranhos Street. The road crossed a large elevation and a sharp slope, which affected traffic flow. Improvements to the layout and urbanization were planned in the 1890s. In 1894, a section was widened; in 1914, additional work was carried out.

During Otávio Rocha's administration, providing a solution to the street's circulation problem became a priority, as it aimed to establish an important link between the historic center and the Menino Deus neighborhood. In 1925, construction began in the city. The route of the street was extended to 1,050 meters and the span widened to 21 meters, which required the expropriation of a large area of land and the demolition of many old buildings. In 1927, the total cost of the work was estimated at Rs$14,000.

Due to the size of the project and the high cost, the work lasted for decades. In 1928, construction began on the Otávio Rocha Viaduct to allow the path to pass under Duque de Caxias Street. Designed by Manoel Barbosa Assumpção Itaqui and Duilio Bernardi, with sculptures by Alfred Adloff, it was completed in 1932 and listed as a heritage site in 1988.

In 1935, the stretch between Andradas Street and Montevideo Square was completed. In the 1940s, it reached the Praia de Belas area. At the same time, the area around the avenue began to be populated with constructions such as the Sulacap, Sul América, União and Vera Cruz buildings. After the Praia de Belas embankment was completed, the avenue was stretched to Padre Cacique Avenue.

== See also ==
- History of Rio Grande do Sul
- Architecture of Porto Alegre
