= 1260 (skateboarding) =

Skateboarding trick

The 1260 is a skateboarding trick, performed on a mega ramp, in which the skateboarder makes three-and-half revolutions (1260 degrees of rotation) while airborne. It was first completed successfully on a mega ramp in August 2019 by American skateboarder Mitchie Brusco. This trick has not been performed on the classical vert ramp. It currently stands as the trick with the most rotations in skateboarding, as no skater has ever landed four rotations (1440).

== Successful landings ==
=== MegaRamp ===
1. Mitchie Brusco, 3 August 2019, MegaRamp, Minneapolis, Minnesota (USA) at 2019 X Games
