= Vert ramp =

Type of ramp for skateboarding etc.

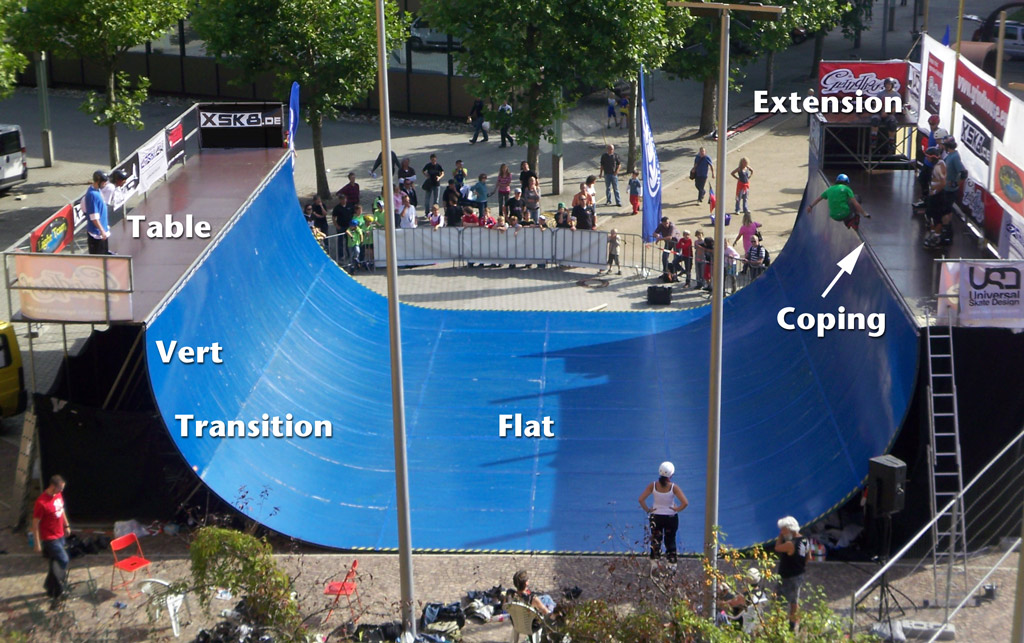
Annotated picture showing the different sections of a vert ramp

A vert ramp is a form of half-pipe used in extreme sports such as vert skating, vert skateboarding, vert BMX and vert roller skating.

Vert ramps are so named because they transition from a horizontal plane (known as the flat-bottom) to a vertical section on top.

The typical height of a vert ramp is 11 ft (3.4 m) to 14 ft (4.3 m) with anywhere from 6 in (150 mm) to 2 ft (0.61 m) of vertical on top.

Vert skating ramps can be made with 6 in (150 mm) to 1 ft (0.30 m) of vertical while vert skateboarding ramps are typically made with 1ft to 2 ft (0.61 m) of vertical in order for the skateboard to launch straight up into the air.

This vertical section makes it easier for the riders to take off and 'catch air' on a vert ramp rather than on a half-pipe. This is because the vert at the top causes the rider to naturally go straight up into the air instead of forward and off the ramp (as is the tendency on half-pipes that don't go vertically upwards).

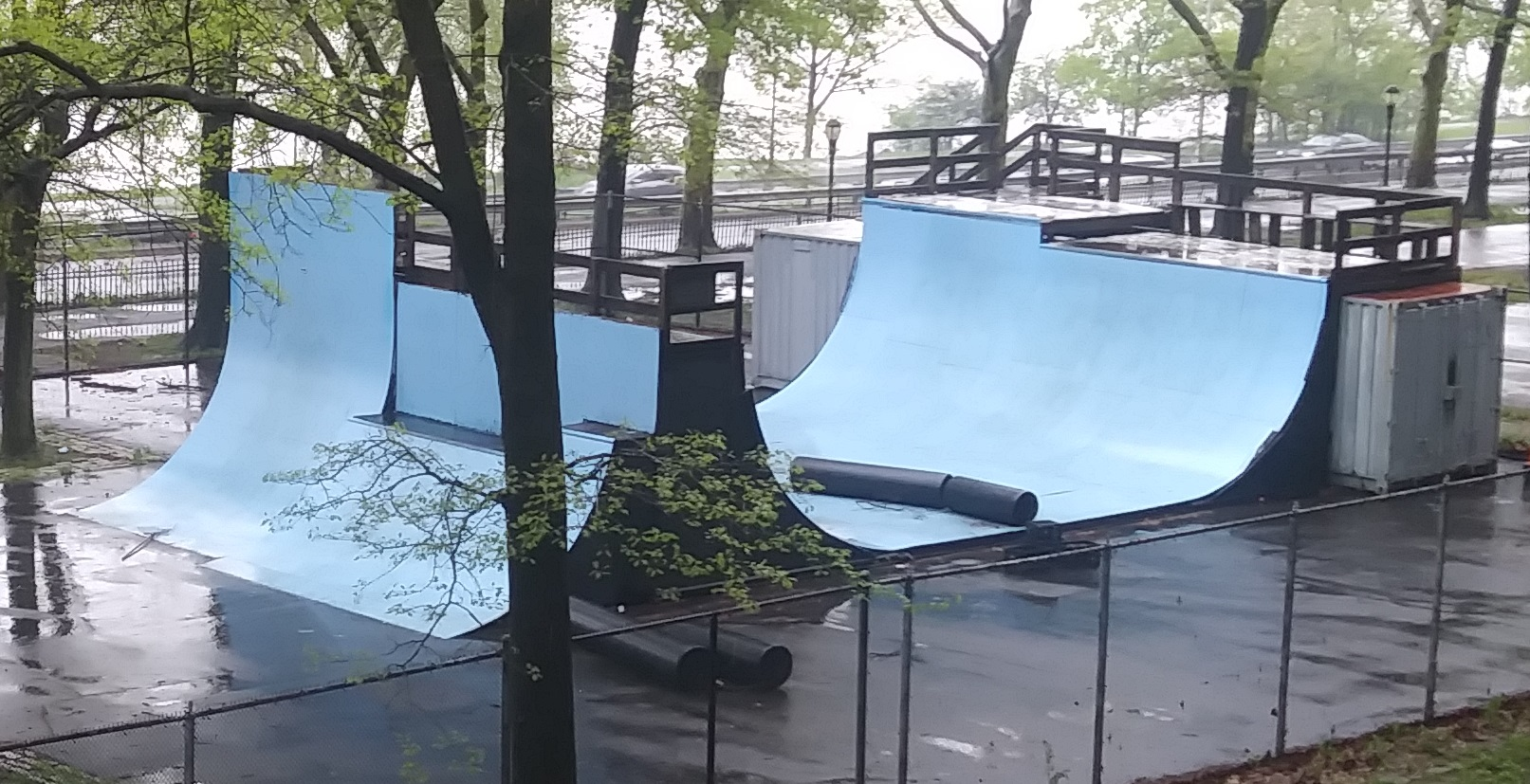
Vert ramps at Riverside Skatepark, NYC, May 2019

== See also ==
- Half pipe
- Mega ramp
- Quarter pipe
- Vert skating
- Skateboard
- BMX
