= Vert skateboarding =

Riding a skateboard on a steep incline

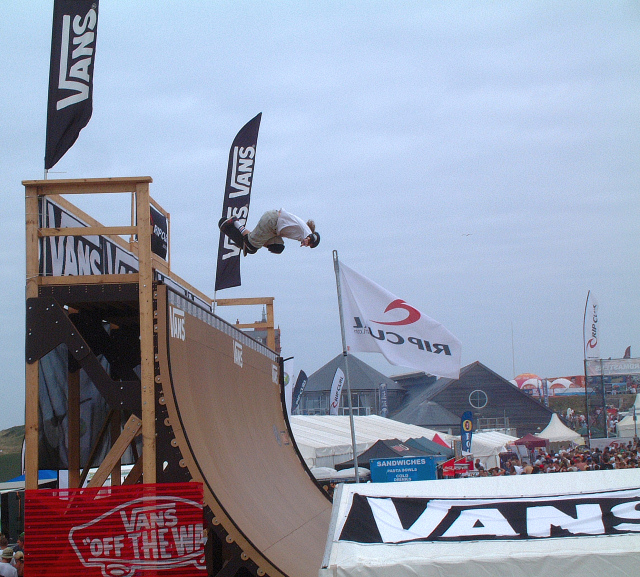
A skateboarder riding a large vert ramp

Vert skateboarding, short for vertical skateboarding, is the act of riding a skateboard on a skate ramp or other incline and involves the skateboarder transitioning from the horizontal plane to the vertical plane in order to perform skateboarding tricks.

== History ==
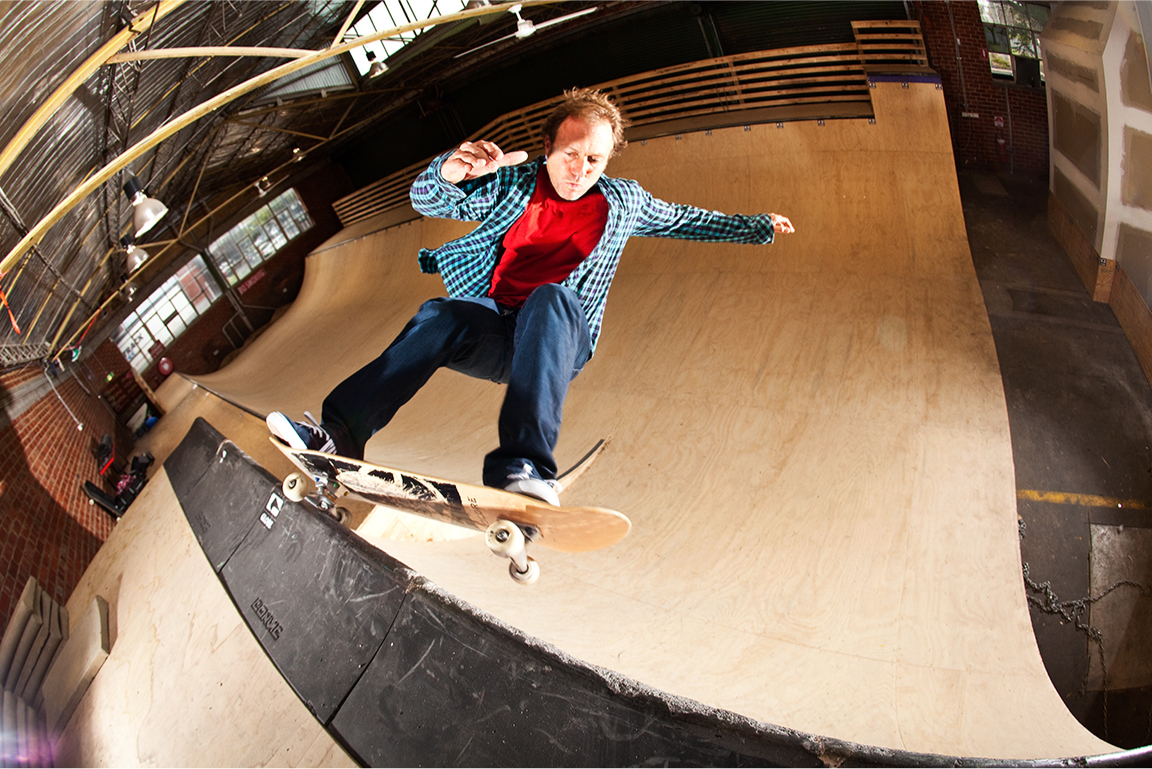
Globe International founder Stephen Hill vert skateboarding on a large half-pipe.

During the 1970s, vert skateboarding had its genesis in "pool riding": the riding of skateboards in an emptied backyard swimming pool.

As riders moved from general street skateboarding and occasional "pool riding" into purpose-built skate parks, vert skateboarding became more popular. Skateboarders began to develop, and then practice, tricks and techniques specifically for vert skateboarding.

Vert skateboarding became a common style of skateboarding and was introduced into many competitions and events, including the X Games and the Maloof Money Cup.

In 2008, ESPN and X Games organizers announced that vert skateboarding would be removed from X Games competitions in favor of free-movement skate-park-style courses where participants would still be able to perform vert skateboarding tricks but would need to do so in combination with other street skateboarding elements. After public condemnation from professional skateboarders Bob Burnquist, Tony Hawk and others, organizers re-instated vert skateboarding.

In 2011, ESPN announced, however, that the X Games would no longer feature a Women's Vert Skateboarding event, citing a lack of "a growing participant base, an established annual competition schedule", and "myriad other factors". Professional skateboarder Lyn-Z Adams Hawkins said the decision would "end the growth for women's vert skating as we know it".

== Skateboard set-up ==
For vert skateboarding, riders usually set up their boards with 55-millimetre (2.2 in) wheels (or larger) and wider decks for more stability.

== See also ==
- Dropping in – Skateboarding trick
- Vert skating – Sport discipline
