= Nicolas Calderón =

Professional Columbian Skater

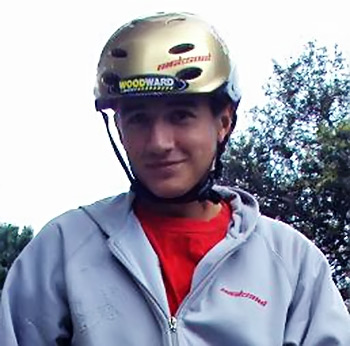

Personal information
- Nationality: Colombian
- Born: February 10, 1986 (age 40) Bogotá, Colombia

Sport
- Sport: Vert skating
Medal record
Competitions
Representing Colombia
| Gold medal – first place | 2010 Tehachapi, CA, USA | Vert |
| | 2019 Barcelona ESP, world roller games 5th place | Vert |

Nicolas Calderón (born February 10, 1986) is a Colombian professional vert skater. He started skating when he was twelve in 1998 and turned professional in 2010.

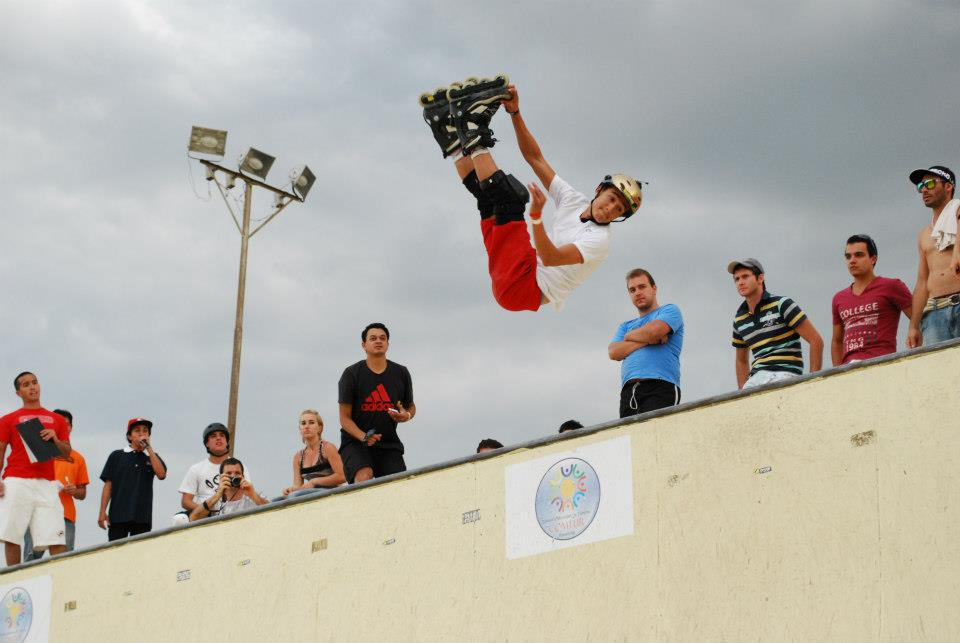
Nicolas vert skating

== Vert competitions ==
- 5th place World Roller Games Barcelona 2019 Pro Vert division
- Performer in Abu Dhabi at the 40th anniversary of United Arab emirates spirit of the union show
- 2012 Indaiamonsters B.L.A.D.E. Brazil - Vert: 7th
- 2010 AIL World Championships Amateur. Tehachapi, CA. - Vert: 1st
- U.S.A. Halfpipe League 2016 Vert pro Contest 6th place - Las Vegas Nevada
- Playas Ecuador 2008 3rd place - park contest
