= Thomas Fry =

Tom or Thomas Fry may refer to:

- Thomas Fry (priest, born 1718) (1718–1772), English priest and academic
- Thomas Fry (priest, born 1775) (1775–1860), English cleric and academic
- Thomas Fry (dean of Lincoln) (1846–1930), English Anglican clergyman, Dean of Lincoln
- Tom Fry (skater) (born 1974), Australian professional vert skater
- Tom Fry (rugby union), English rugby union player
- Tom Fry, British bassist for rock band Nektar since 2014
- Tom Fry, American video game artist for 2018's Sonic Mania

== See also ==
- Thomas Frye (disambiguation)
