= Nagasako =

Nagasako (written: 長嶝 or 長迫) is a Japanese surname. Notable people with the surname include:

- Takashi Nagasako (長嶝 高士, born 1964), Japanese voice actor
- Thumper Nagasako (born 1983), American vert skater
- Yoshitaku Nagasako (長迫 吉拓, born 1993), Japanese cyclist
