= Davide Giannoni =

Italian professional vert skater (born 1978)

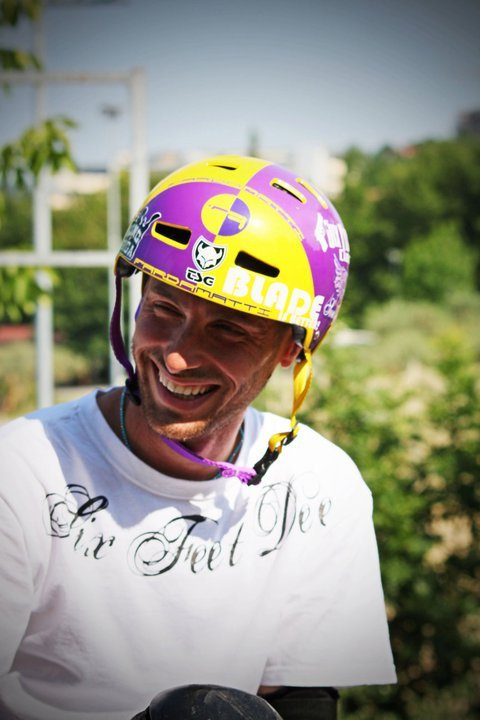

Personal information
- Nationality: Italian
- Born: June 24, 1978 (age 48) Rome, Italy
- Height: 4.9
Medal record
Competitions
Representing San Marino
Gold medal – first place	2009 King of Diga Contest	Vert
Silver medal – second place	2006 Fitness Festival	Vert

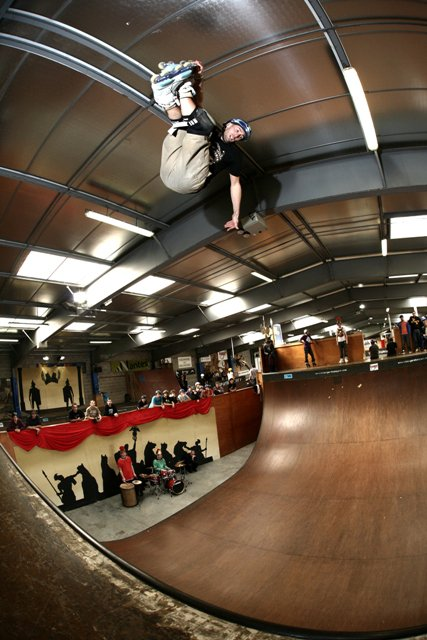
Davide Vert Skating

Davide Giannoni is an Italian professional vert skater. He started skating when he was 21 in 1999 and turned professional in 2010. Giannoni has attended many competitions in his vert skating career.

Best Tricks McTwist 720 & Mc Twist 540

== Competitions ==
- Lousanne contest 2002- 5th position
- Lousanne contest 2003- 5th position
- Festival of fitness 2006- 1st position
- E.C. Championship 2009 Sofia stop- 12th position
- E.C. championship 2009 final contest- 10th position
- King of Diga Contest 2009- 1st position
- 2010 I became a part of the European circuit vert E.C. Championship 2010
- Gladiator Contest 2010 (France) - 4th position pro
- King of Ramps 2010 - 3rd position pro
- E.C. Championship Moscow (Russia) stop - 11th position pro
- E.C. Championship Montana (Bulgaria) stop - 14th position
- E.C. Championship Mallorca (Spain) Surf Action- 7th position
- E.C. Championship Final Berlin (Germany) - 7th position pro
- Championship Ranking 10th position
- Drino invitational mini ramp contest - 2nd position pro 2011
- N.L. 5 contest 4th position pro
- King of the Ramp 2011 2nd position
- E.C. Championship Rotterdam (Netherlands) stop- 6th position
- King of Warriors 2011 Barcelona (Spain) - 6th position
- E.C. Championship Moscow (Russia) stop - 5th position
- 2011 Championship Ranking 6th position
- Gladiator Contest 2012 - 2nd position
- Chewits Xtreme contest Birmingham (United Kingdom) - 3rd position
- Moscow City Games - 7th position
- E.C. Championship Copenaghen stop - 6th position
- King of Warriors contest (Spain) - 3rd position
- GladiatorContest, Nantes (France), 4th
- NLContest, Strasbourg (France), 9th
- Kia World Extreme Games, Shanghai (China), 9th
- FardamattiVertInvitational (San Marino), 3rd
- International Roller Cup, Modena (Ita), 6th
- European Championship Halfpipe Final, Bosh (Netherlands), 6th
- NLContest, Strasburg 2014 (France) 6th
- Fardamatti Vert Invitational 2014 (San Marino),2nd
- Woodward California Camp
- Fardamatti Tour 2014
