= Fabiola da Silva =

Brazilian vert skater (born 1979)

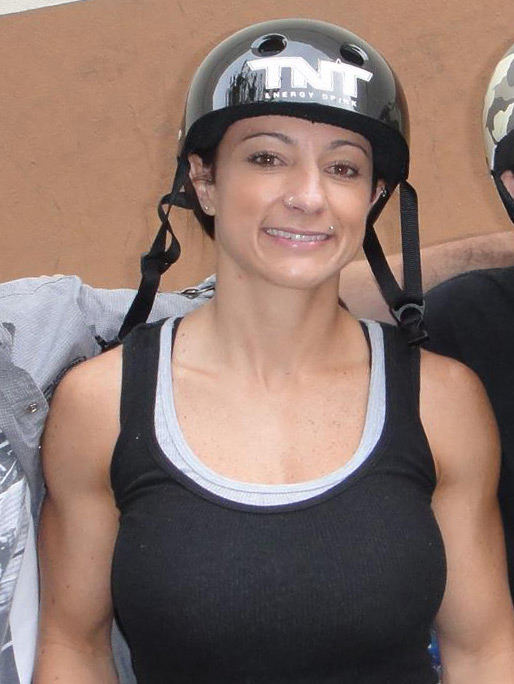

Personal information
- Born: June 18, 1979 (age 47) São Paulo, Brazil

Sport
- Sport: Vert skating
Medal record
Competitions
Representing Brazil
Silver medal – second place	2004 Los Angeles, USA	Vert
Gold medal – first place	2002 Los Angeles, USA	Vert
Gold medal – first place	2001 Los Angeles, USA	Vert
Gold medal – first place	2001 Gravity Games	Vert
Gold medal – first place	2000 Los Angeles, USA	Vert

Fabiola da Silva (born June 18, 1979), nicknamed Fabby, is a Brazilian professional vert skater who competes on the LG Action Sports World Tour. She has received over fifty medals in the LG Action Sports World Tour events. She has received seven X Games gold medals and one silver, making her the most decorated female athlete in X Games history. In a seven-year stretch, she only lost one X Games event, finishing second in 1999.

She has been so dominant against women skaters that she forced the hand of the sport's administrators in respect of limited gender integration of the professional sport: in 2000, the Aggressive Skaters Association created the so-called "Fabiola Rule", which allowed women to compete in the formerly all-male vert competition. Since then, she has placed in the top ten several times in events where she competed against men.

In 2005, she became the first woman ever to land the double back flip on a vert ramp.

Fabiola da Silva features in the three-time Webby Award-winning Book of Cool.

She continues to pursue a world championship.

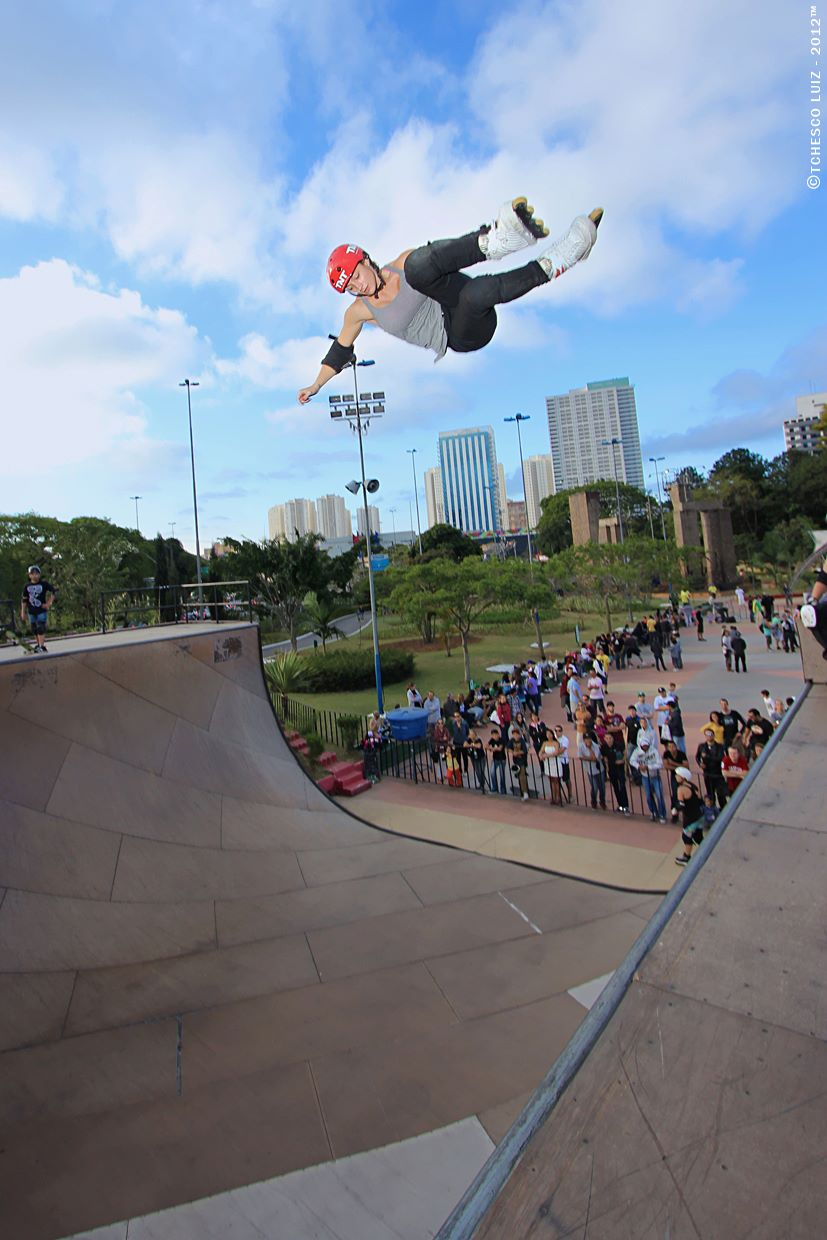
Fabiola Vert Skating

== Competitions ==
- 2009 ASA S3 Supergirl Jam, Venice, CA - Best Trick: 7th
- 2008 LG Action Sports World Championships, Seattle, WA - Street: Bronze Medalist, Vert: Bronze Medalist
- 2008 S3 Supergirl Jam, Huntington Beach, CA - Rail Jam: 5th
- 2007 LG Action Sports World Championships, Dallas, TX - Street: 3rd (female division)
- 2007 LG Action Sports World Championships, Dallas, TX - Vert: 10th
- 2007 Action Sports World Tour, San Diego, CA - Vert: 6th
- 2006 LG Action Sports World Championships, Dallas, TX - Vert: 4th
- 2006 Action Sports US Vert Championship, San Diego, CA - Vert: 4th
- 2006 LG Action Sports World Tour, Paris, France - Street: 3rd (female division)
- 2006 LG Action Sports World Tour, Berlin, Germany - Vert: 6th, Street 4th
- 2006 LG Action Sports World Tour, Birmingham, England - Vert: 8th, Street: 3rd (female division)
- 2006 LG Action Sports World Tour, Amsterdam, Netherlands - Street: 2nd (female division)
- 2006 LG Action Sports World Tour, Amsterdam, Netherlands - Vert: 9th
- 2006 Action Sports World Tour, Richmond, VA - Vert: 6th
- 2005 LG Action Sports World Championship, Manchester, England - Vert: 4th
- 2005 LG Action Sports US Championship, Pomona, CA - Vert: 3rd
- 2005 LG Action Sports World Tour, Moscow, Russia - Vert: 5th
- 2005 LG Action Sports World Tour, Munich, Germany - Vert: 5th
- 2004 Pro Tour Year-End Ranking - Women's Park: 4, Vert: 5
- 2004 LG Action Sports Championships - World Championships - Women's Park: 1st
- 2004 Latin X Games - Vert: Silver Medalist
- 2003 LG Action Sports Championships - World Championships - Women's Park: Silver Medalist
- 2003 Gravity Games - Men's Vert: 6th
- 2003 X Games - Women's Park: Gold Medalist
- 2002 Latin X Games - Vert: Silver Medalist
- 2001 Pro Tour Year-End Ranking - Women's Street & Park: 1st
- 2001 ASA World Championships - Women's Street: Silver Medalist
- 2001 Gravity Games - Women's Vert: 1st, Street 2nd
- 2001 X Games - Women's Vert: Gold Medalist
- 2000 X Games - Women's Vert & Park: Gold Medalist
- 1999 X Games - Women's Vert (Silver) 2nd
- 1998 X Games - Women's Vert (Gold) 1st
- 1997 X Games - Women's Vert (Gold) 1st
- 1996 X Games - Women's Vert (Gold) 1st

== Style ==
Fabiola is also well known for wearing tank tops, girl's boxer briefs and a nose ring.

== Movies ==
Fabiola da Silva played the stunt double for Gabriella in the movie Brink!.
