= Rolling (video game) =

- Cover art
- Developer: Rage Software
- Publisher: SCi
- Engine: RenderWare
- Platforms: PlayStation 2 Xbox
- Release: EU: 24 October 2003
- Genre: Sports
- Modes: Single-player; Multiplayer

Rolling is a 2003 extreme sports video game developed by Rage Software and published by SCi for the PlayStation 2 and Xbox. The game is a simulation of aggressive inline skating in which players skate as one of twenty professional skaters and complete various goals across fourteen levels. Described by the publisher as "the world's most realistic in-line skating game", the game was developed with a realistic design approach, using the input of professional skaters and basing several levels on international skate parks. Production of Rolling was troubled, with the game's release endangered following the financial troubles and collapse of developer Rage Software. SCi acquired and published the game in Europe, with plans for a Game Boy Advance and GameCube release abandoned. Upon release, Rolling received mixed reviews, with several reviewers critiquing the game's linear and dated design compared to the innovations in more recent extreme sports titles, including the Tony Hawk's Pro Skater series.

== Gameplay ==
A screenshot of gameplay in Rolling

Rolling is an extreme sports video game in which the player completes aggressive inline skating challenges across self-contained levels, and earns points for various tricks performed by pressing the controller's face buttons, including grabs, flips and grinds, while in the air or near edges of objects. While skating normally, the user can also "cess slide" by using the shoulder buttons, and 'manual' by pressing the Up and Down directional buttons in quick succession. In the game's main 'Career' mode, players choose a professional or custom skater and skate across time-limited runs across ten street levels and four competition levels. Street level objectives include earning a certain number of points in a run, collecting various objects, and earning enough points or performing a certain trick in front of a cameraman. Competition level objectives consist of completing three runs to earn the highest overall score, based on points accumulated, with the first run being a qualifier and the second runs being judged. As the player progresses in objectives, they earn reputation, which allows them to unlock new levels, sponsors, and tricks. Completing tricks across the game improves the player's statistics in ten areas, allowing them to improve their speed, air, and performance of tricks.

in 'Practice' mode, players can freely skate in levels unlocked in the Career mode without a time limit, although there are no objectives and statistics cannot be improved. Rolling features a multiplayer mode supporting two-player co-operative play across several challenge types, including to get the highest score in 'High Score', collecting pickups dropped by completing high scoring tricks in 'Stealing Scores', passing a bomb in 'Time Bomb', following or avoiding players in 'Close Up', performing tricks in certain zones in 'In the Zone', and tagging a logo in as many zones as possible in 'Tagging'. The game also features a player editor that allows the user to assign biographical details, different hair, skin, tattoos and clothing items unlocked in career mode, and a level editor that allows the player to create their own skatepark for use in practice and multiplayer modes.

== Development ==
Rolling was created by Rage Software, a Liverpool based studio who developed several sports video games including the Striker series of association football video games. Originally announced under several working titles, including Cesar and Fabiola's Inline Skate and SK8, the title was announced for the Xbox and PlayStation 2 at E3 2001, with the game featuring inline skaters including Cesar Mora and Fabiola da Silva, described as an "athletic, fast and exciting" aggressive inline skating title. Majesco originally was slated to publish the title in North America, with ports of the game planned for the GameCube and independent developer Fluid Studios to port the game to the Game Boy Advance. The game was developed with the intent of being an "authentic" representation of aggressive inline skating, engaging regular input from professional skaters and representing several international skate parks, including Rampworx Skatepark in Liverpool, Escondido Skatepark in California and G-Skates Skatepark in Kobe.

Rolling experienced a troubled publication due to the collapse of developer Rage Software. In 2002, the developer entered financial problems following a decision to engage in heavy investment in a transition towards publishing games, leading to a sharp fall in the company's share prices. Following the collapse of the company in January 2003, plans to publish the game with Majesco in North America were abandoned, with SCi acquiring the title for a planned release in Europe. SCi development director Darren Barnet noted the publisher was "extremely impressed" with the title, and hired members of the original development team to finalize the final touches on the "very complete" game.

== Critical reception ==
Reception

Aggregate score
Aggregator	Score	
Aggregator	PS2	Xbox
GameRankings	57%	57%

Review scores
Publication	Score	
Publication	PS2	Xbox
GamesMaster	55%	55%
PlayStation Official Magazine – UK	6/10	N/A
Official Xbox Magazine (UK)	N/A	5.9/10
Game Power Australia	6.5/10	N/A

Rolling received mixed reviews, with an average review score of 57% according to review aggregator GameRankings. Several reviewers assessed the game as a poorer imitation of the Tony Hawk's Pro Skater series of extreme sports games. Describing the game as "playable" but "mediocre", Official Xbox Magazine UK described the game as "dated and derivative" due to its resemblance to earlier Tony Hawk's Pro Skater titles, writing "had this been released two years ago, it might have felt quite ordinary. Now, it's almost bordering on the retro." Game Power Australia similarly critiqued the game, citing its "seemingly pointless goals" and absence of innovations in newer extreme sports titles, such as the removal of time limits, manual tricks, and reverts, writing "if you've played a Tony Hawk's Pro Skater game, you really have seen everything Rolling has to offer. GamesMaster critiqued the game as a "step backwards compared to practically every other extreme sports game around", citing the "dull" backgrounds, lack of depth, and "dodgy controls". However, whilst noting that the game "copies Tony Hawk's but can't match (its) gnarled greatness", Official PlayStation Magazine UK stated that the game "defies expectations" and praised the game's animation, career mode, and soundtrack.
