= Lindenmuth =

Lindenmuth is a surname. Notable people with the surname include:

- Arlington Nelson Lindenmuth (1856–1950), American landscape and portrait painter
- Ezekiel Lindenmuth (born 1997), New Zealand rugby union player
- Matt Lindenmuth (born 1981), American snowboarder
- Tanya Lindenmuth (born 1979), American cyclist
- Gregory Lindenmuth (born 1967), American banking regulator and executive
