= Chris Edwards (skater) =

American vert skater

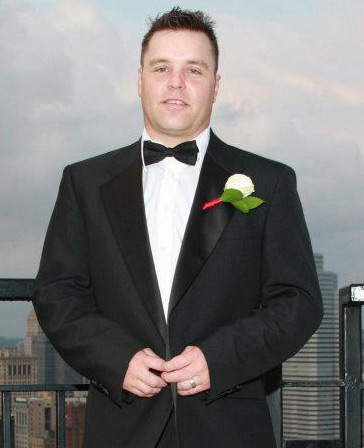
- Edwards in September 2012

Personal information
- Nickname: Airman
- Born: Chris Denton; December 22, 1973 (age 52) Minneapolis, Minnesota, United States
- Height: 5 ft 6 in (1.68 m)

Sport
- Sport: Vert skating
Medal record
Competitions
Representing United States
Silver medal – second place	1998 High Jump	Vert
Bronze medal – third place	1997 Los Angeles, CA, USA	Vert
Bronze medal – third place	1996 Los Angeles, CA, USA	Vert

Chris Edwards (born December 22, 1973) is an American former professional vert skater. Edwards is widely considered one of the founding pioneers of the discipline of aggressive inline skating.

== Background ==
Edwards was born Chris Denton in Minneapolis, Minnesota and grew up in Escondido, California. In 1986, he started skating when he was thirteen years old. Edwards' became known for his skating prowess at an early age, appearing in commercials and as a stunt double, as inline skating became popular in the early 1990s. In 1993, Edwards appeared in the rollerblading film Airborne. The film would go on to be a cult favorite and touchstone for the burgeoning sport of inline skating.

=== Professional skating ===
At age 16, he became one of the early members of Team Rollerblade. In 1995, the then Chris Denton turned professional and became Chris Edwards. Edwards would go on to compete in the inaugural Extreme Games, later known as the X Games.

At his height, Edwards had several inline skates named after him, including: tarmac CE (Chris Edwards), Edwards Chocolate (street), Edwards Trooper (vert) and Edwards Daytona,"CE Speedsters", and the "CE Hermes" circa 1994 - 1999.

In 2002, Edwards appeared in the video game Aggressive Inline for the PlayStation 2, Xbox, and GameCube.

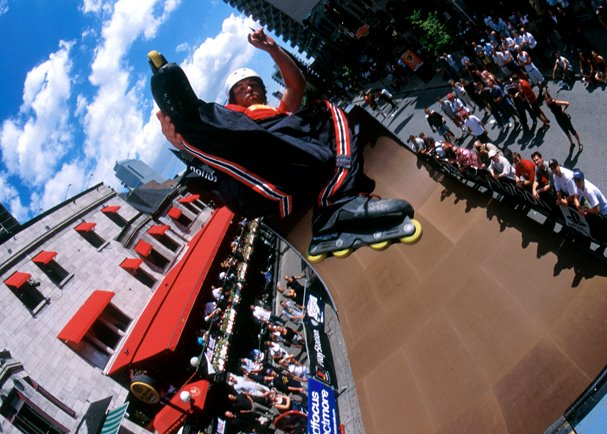
Edwards vert skating

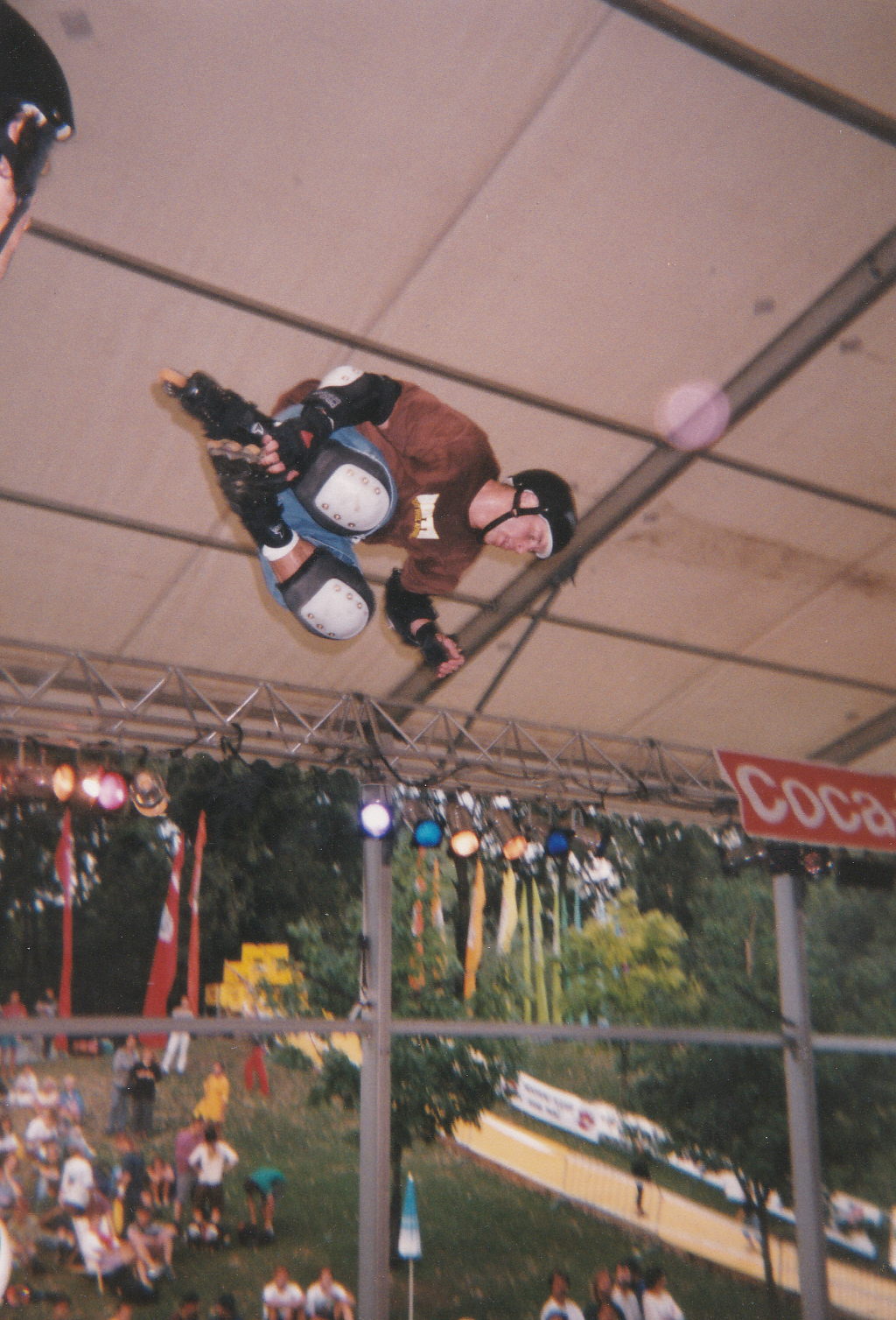
Chris Edwards (inline skater) - Lausanne 1995 contest

== Vert competitions ==
- 1999 X Games, San Francisco, California - Vert: 10th
- 1998 X Games, San Diego, California - High Jump: 2nd
- 1997 X Games, San Diego, California - Vert: 3rd
- 1997 X Games, San Diego, California - Street: 3rd
- 1996 X Games, Providence, Rhode Island - Vert: 3rd
- 1995 X Games, Providence, Rhode Island - Vert: 4th

== Publications ==
- Irwin, D., Edwards, C. (2000). Inline Skating. United States: Dorling Kindersley Pub. ISBN 9780789465429
