= Eitan Kramer =

American vert skater (born 1978)

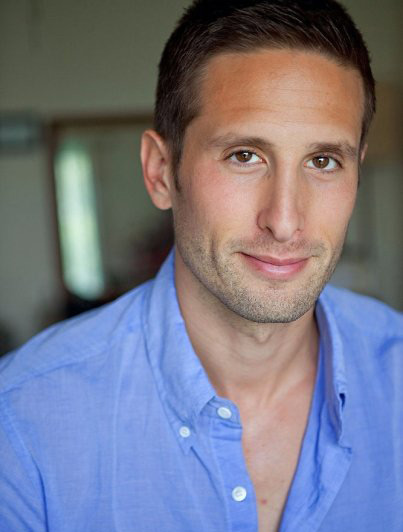

Personal information
- Born: August 23, 1978 (age 47) New York, NY, United States
Medal record
Competitions
Representing United States
Gold medal – first place	1997 ASA, Milwaukee	Vert
Bronze medal – third place	1997 ASA, New York City	Vert
Gold medal – first place	1997 X Games, Providence	Vert
Gold medal – first place	1996 ASA, New York City	Vert
Bronze medal – third place	1996 Venice Beach	Vert
Silver medal – second place	1996 Miami	Vert
Gold medal – first place	1996 High Air	Vert
Silver medal – second place	1995 Chicago	Vert

Eitan Kramer was a top American professional Vert Skater who holds a Guinness World Record for "highest air on a vert ramp." Kramer, a Phi Beta Kappa graduate of the University of California Los Angeles, began his professional in-line skating career at age 15.

Kramer received the Guinness Record during the 1999 MTV Sports and Music Festival 3D.

As an actor, he appeared in Honeymoon With Mom (2006), "Tides of War" (2005) and Rollerball (2002).

He is the inventor of MorfBoard, RukusFX, and SW/CH Board

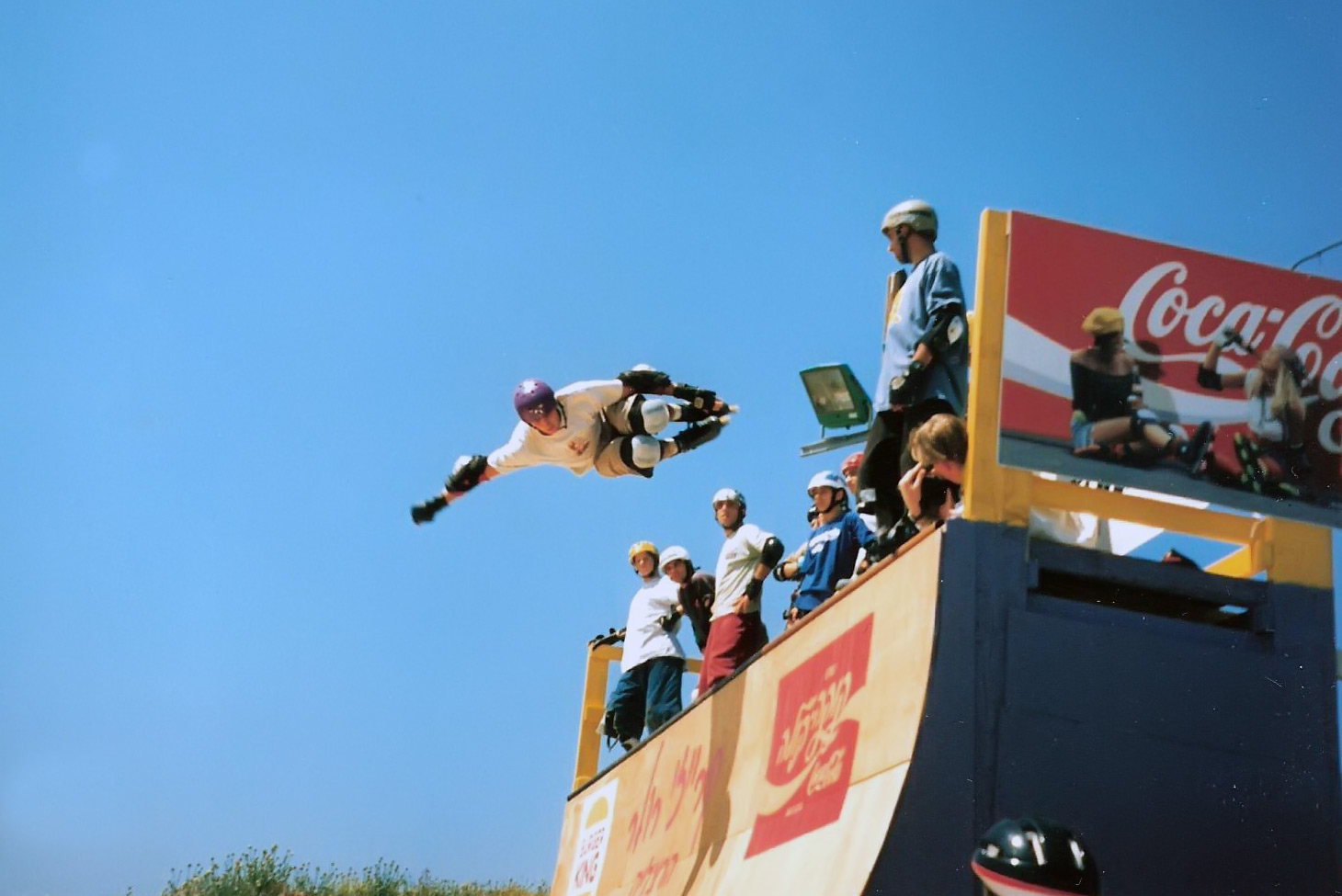
Eitan Vert Skating

== Vert competitions ==
- 1999 MTV SMF3D Guinness Record Holder- 14 ft
- 1997 ASA, Milwaukee, First Place Vert
- 1997 ASA, NYC, Third Place Vert
- 1997 X Games, Orlando, FL, Trials Fourth Place Vert
- 1997 X Games, Providence, Trials First Place Vert
- 1996 ASA, New York City, First Place
- 1996 MISS, Venice Beach, Third Place
- 1996 ASA, Miami, FL, Second Place
- 1996 Ultimate Ilnline, High Air, First Place
- 1995 ASA Overall, Third Place
- 1995 ASA, Chicago, IL, Second Place Vert
- 1994 NISS Overall Seventh Place
