= Leonid Kamburov =

Russian professional vert skater (born 1982)

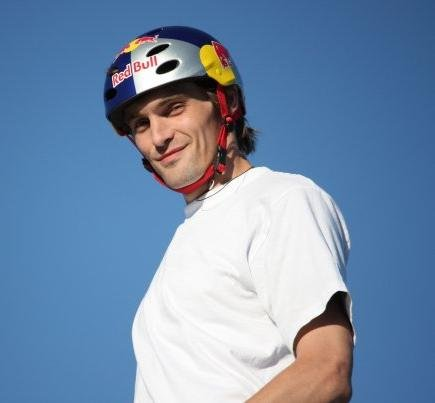

Personal information
- Nationality: Russian
- Born: January 16, 1982 (age 44) Moscow, Russia

Sport
- Sport: Vert skating
Medal record
Competitions
Representing Russia
Bronze medal – third place	2010 European Championships	Vert

Leonid Kamburov is a Russian professional vert skater. Kamburov started skating when he was 14 in 1996 and turned professional in 2002. Kamburov has attended many competitions in his vert skating career.

Best Tricks McTwist 1080, Fakie 900

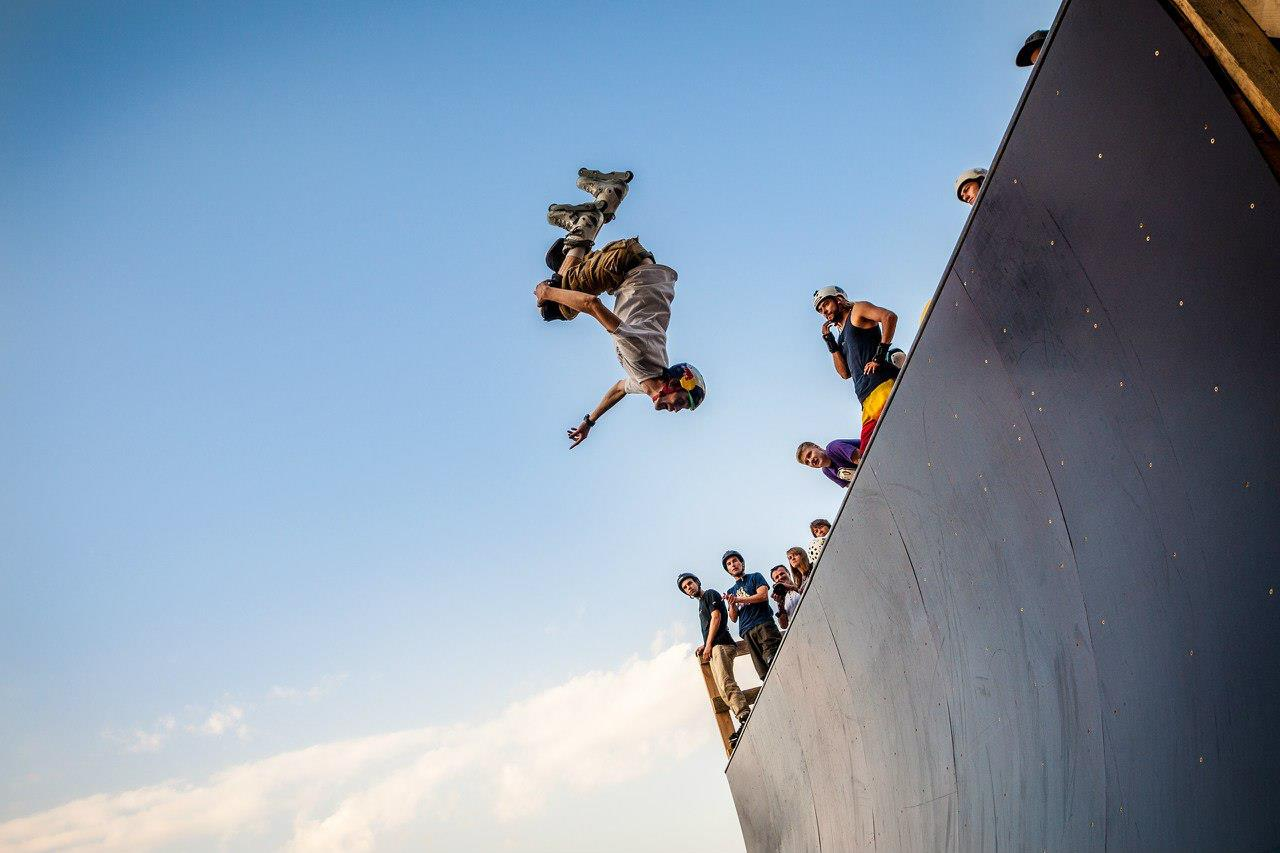
Kamburov Vert Skating

== Vert Competitions ==
- 2012 Asian X-Games in China 4th place
- 2011 Asian X-Games in China 7th place
- 2010 European Championships 3rd place
- 2009 European Championships 4th place
