= Marco de Santi =

Brazilian professional vert skater (born 1983)

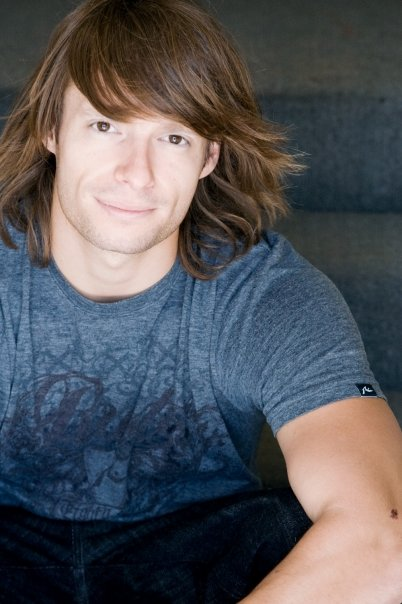

Personal information
- Born: May 26, 1983 (age 43) São Paulo, Brazil
- Height: 5 ft 7 in (170 cm)

Sport
- Sport: Vert skating
Medal record
X Games
Representing Brazil
Silver medal – second place	2009 Shanghai	Vert
Gold medal – first place	2008 Seattle	Vert
Gold medal – first place	2005 Seoul	Vert
Silver medal – second place	2005 Moscow	Vert
Silver medal – second place	2004 USA	Vert
Silver medal – second place	2004 Los Angeles	Vert
Silver medal – second place	2003 Cleveland	Vert

Marco de Santi (born 1983) is a Brazilian professional vert skater. Santi was the first person to ever land a triple backflip in the world at woodward's resi ramp. When inline skating was removed from the X-Games, vert skaters found other ways to profit from their sport and their talent. Santi joined Cirque du Soleil. Santi has won many X Games medals.

== Vert Competitions ==
- 2008 LG Action Sports World Championships, Seattle - Vert: Gold Medalist
- 2005 LG Action Sports World Championship, Manchester - Vert 5th
- 2005 LG Action Sports World Tour, Moscow - Vert: 2nd
- 2004 LG Action Sports Championships: Silver Medalist
- 2004 X Games: 2nd
- 2004 Core Tour, New York: 1st
- 2003 NBC Gravity Games - Cleveland: 2nd
- 2003 ASA Pro Tour - Dulles: 6th
- 2002 ASA Pro Tour - Baltimore: 13th
- 2002 ESPN X Games: 12th
- 2001 ASA Pro Tour - Baltimore: 8th
