= Tim Ward (skater) =

Australian vert skater (born 1978)

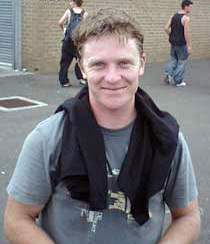

Personal information
- Nationality: Australian
- Born: May 6, 1978 (age 48) Melbourne, Australia

Sport
- Sport: Vert skating
Medal record
Competitions
Representing Australia
Gold medal – first place	1997 X Games	Vert

Tim Ward (born May 6, 1978) is a former top Australian professional vert skater. Ward won many competitions in his vert skating career.

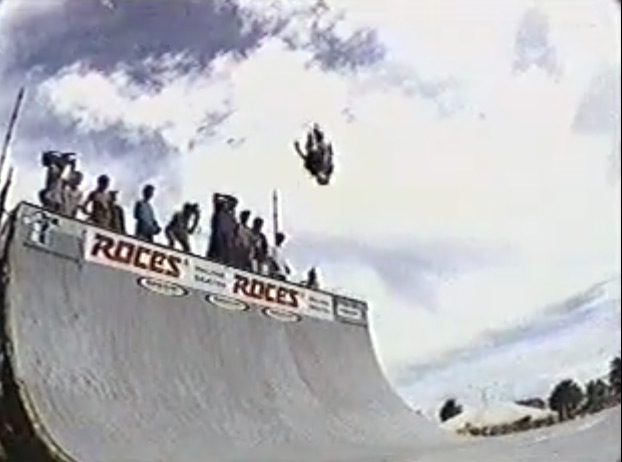
Tim Vert Skating

== Vert Competitions ==
- 1999 Street IISS Comp, Canberra 1st
- 1999 Australian Championship First Place Vert
- 1997 X Games - Vert: 1st
- 1997 Lausanne Second Place Vert
- 1997 X Games Vert Champion
- 1997 X Games Second Place Street
- 1997 Orlando X-Games Trials Second Place Street
- 1997 Orlando X-Gaines Trials Third Place Vert
- 1997 Australian Championship First Place Vert
- 1997 Paris Hersey First Place Street
- 1997 Paris Bersey Second Place Street
- 1996 MSS Amsterdam Second Place Vert
- 1996 BUSS Amsterdam Eight Place Street
- 1996 Victorian Titles First Place Vert
- 1995 Victorian Titles First Place Street
- 1995 ASA Finals First Place Street
- 1995 Australian Title Open Div, First Place Street
- 1995 Australian Title Open Div. Second Place Vert
- 1995 Extreme Games Thirteenth Place Vert
- 1994 Australian Title Under 16 First Place
