= Alberto Arakaki =

Brazilian professional vert skater

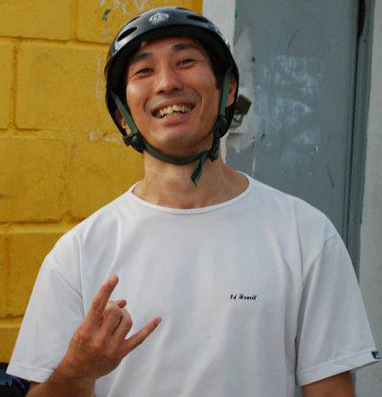

Personal information
- Born: May 14, 1972 (age 54) São Paulo, Brazil
- Occupation: In line skates instructor
- Height: 1.66 m (5 ft 5 in)
- Weight: 73 kg (161 lb)
- Children: 3
- Relative: Married
Medal record
Competitions
Representing Brazil
Gold medal – first place	1996 Rolleraction, Brazil	Vert
Gold medal – first place	1996 Rock & Roller, ASA Pro Tour Brazil	Vert
Gold medal – first place	1996 Rollerbrothers/B.Funda, Brazil	Vert
Silver medal – second place	1997 Clube Pinheiros, ASA Pro Tour Brazil	Vert
Silver medal – second place	1997 Rock & Roller, ASA Pro Tour Brazil	Vert
Gold medal – first place	1998 Praia de Baraqueçada, ASA Pro Tour Brazil	Vert
Gold medal – first place	1998 Mira-Flores, X-Treme, Peru	Vert
Gold medal – first place	1999 Praia de Sao Vicente, ASA Pro Tour Brazil	Vert
Silver medal – second place	2000 GR Holliday Skatepark, ASA Pro Tour Japan	Vert
Gold medal – first place	2000 Osaka Skatepark, Osaka Pro Contest Japan	Vert
Gold medal – first place	2001 GR Holliday Skatepark, ASA Pro Tour Japan	Vert
Bronze medal – third place	2001 Toyama Skatepark, ASA Pro Tour Japan	Vert

Alberto Arakaki AKA japa (born May 14, 1972) is a Brazilian professional vert skater. Japa started quad skating when he was 6 in 1978, practiced skateboarding until was 15, and went to bmx flatland from 15 to 18 years old. Them met aggressive inline skating at age 20 (1995) and turned professional in 1996. Japa has won many competitions in his vert skating career.

Best Tricks: McTwists and Flatspins

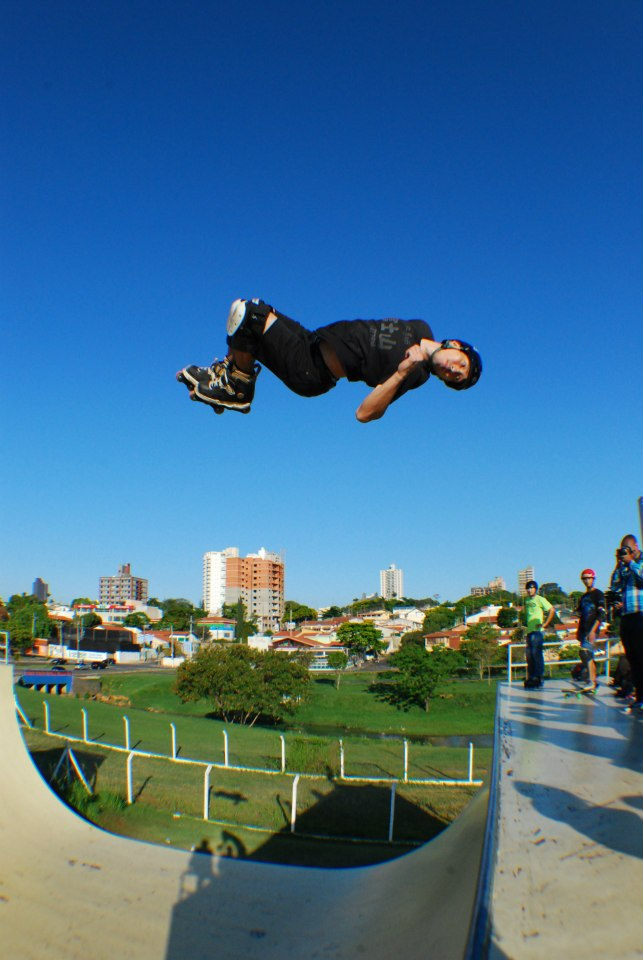
Alberto Vert Skating

== Local vert competitions ==
- 1995 Campeonato Rollerbrothers – Barra Funda/SP – Vert: 4th (amateur)
- 1996 Campeonato Roller Action – Mooca/SP – Vert: 1st
- 1996 Etapa ASA Brasil Rock & Roller – Santana/SP – Vert: 1st
- 1996 Campeonato Rollerbrothers – Barra Funda/SP – Vert: 1st
- 1996 Feiteens – Center Norte/SP – Vert: 3rd
- 1997 Feiteens – Center Norte/SP – Vert: 5th
- 1997 Etapa ASA Brasil Rock & Roller – Santana/SP – Vert: 2nd
- 1997 Etapa ASA Brasil – Pinheiros/SP – Vert: 2nd
- 1997 FERA Brasil – Shopping Eldorado/SP – Vert: 5th
- 1997 Desafio Aereo – Shopping Eldorado/SP – Vert: 2nd
- 1998 Desafio Aereo – Praia de Baraqueçaba/SP – Vert: 1st
- 1998 Etapa ASA Brasil – Praia de Baraqueçada/SP – Vert: 1st
- 1999 Etapa ASA Brasil – Praia de Sao Vicente/SP – Vert: 1st
- 1999 Campeonato de Duplas – Praia de Sao Vicente/SP – Vert: 2nd
- 2002 Z-Games – Ginasio do Ibirapuera/SP – Vert: 6th
- 2004 Circuito Nescau Energy – Ginasio Militar/POA/RS – Vert: 7th
- 2005 Rio Vert Jam – Lagoa Rodrigo de Freitas/RJ Vert: 4th
- 2006 Rio Vert Jam – Lagoa Rodrigo de Freitas/RJ Vert: 5th
- 2017 Indaiamonsters – Sao Bernardo do Campo/SP – Vert: 3rd
- 2018 Indaiamonsters – Sao Bernardo do Campo/SP - Vert: 4th
- 2019 Indaiamonsters - Fabrika do Skate/Itu - Vert: 4th
- 2023 Campeonato Paulista Rollerfreestyle Vertical Fepatins - Tiete/Sp - Vert: 3rd
- 2024 Campeonato Paulista Rollerfreestyle Vertical Fepatins - Indaiatuba/Sp - Vert: 3rd

== International vert competitions ==
- 1998 X-Treme Peru – Mira Flores/PERU – Vert: 1st
- 1998 X-Treme Peru categoria BMX Freestyle Mira Flores/PERU – Flatland: 1st
- 1998 IISS (International Inline Skate Series) – Praia de Baraqueçaba/SP/BRAZIL – Vert: 5th
- 1999 IISS (International Inline Skate Series) – Sao Vicente/SP/BRAZIL – Vert: 7th
- 1999 X-Games – Virginia Beach/EUA – Vert: 13th
- 1999 Ultimate Inline Skate by Rollerblade – Universal Studios/EUA – Vert: 19th
- 2000 ASA Japan (JASPA) GR Holliday Sk8 Park – Taketoyo/JAPAN – Vert: 2nd
- 2000 Osaka Pro Contest – Osaka/JAPAN – Vert: 1st
- 2001 ASA Japan (JASPA) GR Holliday Sk8 Park – Taketoyo/JAPAN – Vert: 1st
- 2001 Tokyo Aggressive Inline Circuit (Vert) – Toyama/JAPAN – Vert: 3rd
- 2001 Tokyo Aggressive Inline Circuit (Street) – Toyama/JAPAN – Vert: 6th
- 2001 ASA Finals (JASPA) – Osaka/JAPAN – Vert: 3rd
- 2002 Latin X-Games I Barracao do Flamengo/RJ/BRAZIL – Vert: 9th
- 2003 Latin X-Games II Praia do Leme/RJ/BRAZIL – Vert: 13th
- 2004 Latin X-Games III Praia do Leme/RJ/BRAZIL – Vert: 10th
- 2006 Globo Pro Rad Ginásio do Ibirapuera/SP – Vert: 6th

== Shows Demos ==
- Squizz/Yopa – Guaruja/SP (96)
- Feiteens – Sampa/SP (96)
- Fenatec – Lar Center/SP(96)
- Abertura da pista de street na Rollerbrothers – Barra Funda/SP (97)
- Playcenter Crazy Days – Sampa/SP (97)
- Feiteens – Sampa/SP (97)
- Team RB com Chris Edwards – Praia do Leme/RJ (97)
- Team RB com Chris Edwards – Bowl Rio Santos (97)
- Team RB com Chris Edwards na Rock & Roller Santana/SP (97)
- Team RB com Chris Edwards na Rollerbrothers Barra Funda/SP (97)
- Tong Do Sa Park Tour – Tong Do/Coreia do Sul (97)
- Demo Rollerbrothers III - Porto Alegre/RS (98)
- Demo Roller Bah Tche - Porto Alegre/RS (98)
- Team Roces Tour – Rollerbrothers/SP (98)
- Team Roces Tour – Rock'n'Roller/SP (98)
- Playcenter Crazy Days – Sampa/SP (98)
- Daytona Sk8 Park Peru – Mira Flores/Peru (98)
- Planeta Atlantida – Praia Atlantida/RS (99)
- Fenac Center Norte – Santana/SP (99)
- Oficina & Companhia – Salto/SP (99)
- Juiz no Z-Games (2002)
- Juiz na 2a etapa Nescau Radical em MG (2003)
- Tent Beach Best Trick Insano Shopping Dom Pedro Campinas/SP (23/03/2003)
- Facira 2003
- Domingo Radical – Atibaia/SP (2003)
- Dia D em Sampa Anhangabaú (2003)
- Team Red Bull em Araxa/MG (2005)
- Team Red Bull no Salão 4 rodas em SP (2005)
- GAS Festival 2007
- GAS Festival 2008
- 1º encontro ESTILOGRAUº sessão na mini ramp Indaiatuba (2012) Indaiatuba/SP
- Indaiamonsters Blade Indaiatuba/SP (25/08/2012)
- CBER Indaiatuba/SP 2012
- Game of Blade by Achrezzi - Indaiatuba/SP (02/12/2012)
- Indaiamonsters - Indaiatuba/SP (07/09/2015)
- Indaiamonsters - SBC/SP 2017
- Indaiamonsters - SBC/SP 2018
- Indaiamonsters - Itu/SP 2019
- Indaiamonsters - Indaiatuba/SP 10/12/2022
- Indaiamonsters - Indaiatuba/SP 14/07/2024
- Indaiamonsters - Tiete/SP 07/11/2024
- Indaiamonsters - Indaiatuba/SP 18/07/2025
- Indaiamonsters - Tiete/SP 19/10/2025
