= Sven Boekhorst =

Dutch skater

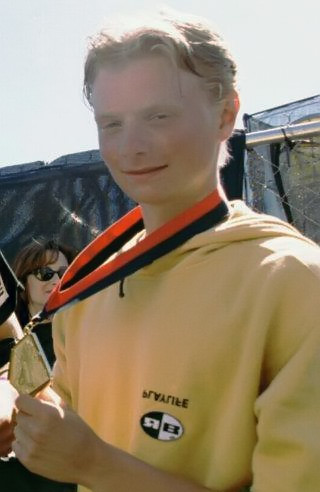

Personal information
- Nationality: Dutch
- Born: June 19, 1980 (age 46) 's-Hertogenbosch, Netherlands
- Height: 5 ft 9 in (1.75 m)
- Weight: 145 lb (66 kg)
- Website: www.svenboekhorst.com
Medal record
Competitions
Representing Netherlands
Gold medal – first place	1998 ASA Toronto	Park
Bronze medal – third place	1998 X Games - triples	Halfpipe
Gold medal – first place	1999 IISS Finals World Championships	Park
Gold medal – first place	1999 NISS Finals USA Championships	Park
Gold medal – first place	1999 X Games - triples	Halfpipe
Gold medal – first place	1999 Gravity Games	Park
Gold medal – first place	2000 Pro Tour	Park
Gold medal – first place	2000 X Games	Park
Gold medal – first place	2000 X Australian Games	Park
Gold medal – first place	2000 Gravity Games	Park
Gold medal – first place	2000 ASA World Championships	Park
Bronze medal – third place	2003 X Games	Park
Silver medal – second place	2005 Asian X Games	Park
Bronze medal – third place	2005 Asian X Games	Halfpipe
Silver medal – second place	2006 LG Berlin	Park
Gold medal – first place	2010 Barcelona Extreme Festival	Halfpipe

Sven Boekhorst (born 19 June 1980) is a Dutch roller skater.

Boekhorst started

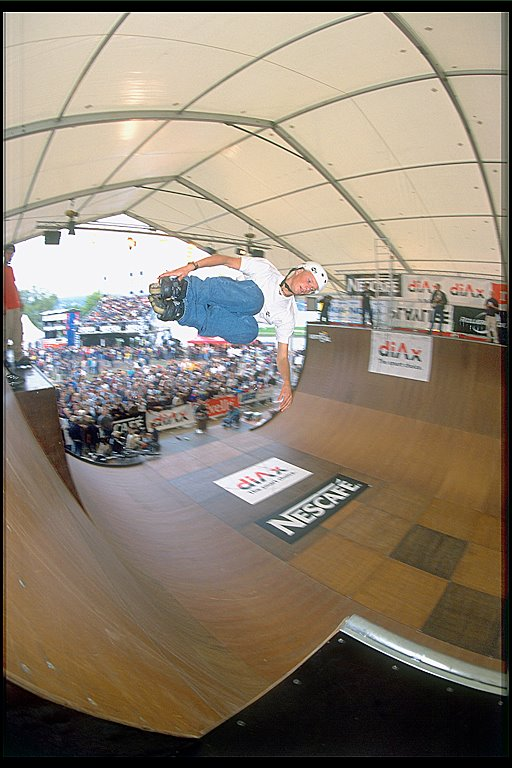
n Vert Skating

== Results ==
=== 2018 ===
- Best Trick winner Ghetto Games Ventspil, Latvia

=== 2017 ===
- 1st place NL Contest, Strassbourg Spine
- 2nd place NL Contest, Strassbourg Park
- 2nd place Pannonian Challenge Osijek, Croatie Park
- 5th place Barcelona Extreme Park

=== 2013 ===
- 8th place Winterclash Einhoven, Netherlands Park

=== 2012 ===
- 9th place Winterclash Eindhoven, Netherlands Park
- 4th place South Korea Contest, Park

=== 2011 ===
- 5th place Winterclash Eindhoven, Netherlands Park
- 4th place FISE Montpellier, France Park
- 3rd place FISE Montpellier, France Spine
- 2nd place FISE Montpellier, France High Air

=== 2010 ===
- 5th place Winterclash Berlin, Germany Park
- 1st place YOU Messe Berlin, Germany Spine
- 1st place Barcelona Extreme Festival Halfpipe
- 2nd place Bowl contest Lausanne, Switzerland Bowl

=== 2009 ===
- 6th place Winterclash Eindhoven, Netherlands Park

=== 2008 ===
- 4th place Asian X-Games Shanghai, China Halfpipe
- 8th place Asian X-Games Shanghai, China Park
- Best Trick European Championships Montana, Bulgaria
- 2nd place SlammJamm Liverpool, UK Park
- 1st place Barcelona Extreme Festival Halfpipe
- 2nd place YOU Messe Berlin, Germany Halfpipe
- 5th place LG Finals Seattle, USA Halfpipe

=== 2007 ===
- 5th place FISE Montpellier, France Park
- 8th place LG Finals Dallas, TX Park

=== 2006 ===
- 5th place LG Amsterdam, Netherlands Park
- 3rd place LG Birmingham, UK Park
- 3rd place LG Birmingham, UK Halfpipe
- 2nd place LG Berlin, Germany Park
- 4th place LG Berlin, Germany Halfpipe
- 4th place LG Paris, France Halfpipe
- 3rd place LG San Diego, CA Halfpipe
- 3rd place Pro Rad São Paulo, Brazil Halfpipe

=== 2005 ===
- 8th place LG Moscow, Russia Halfpipe
- 4th place LG Munich, Germany Park
- 7th place LG Rimini, Italy Park
- 9th place LG Finals Manchester, UK Park
- 2nd place Asian X-Games Seoul, South Korea Park
- 3rd place Asian X-Games Seoul, South Korea Halfpipe

=== 2004 ===
- 5th place ASA Finals Ontario, CA Park

=== 2003 ===
- 3rd place X-Games Los Angeles, CA Park
- 5th place X-Games Los Angeles, CA Halfpipe
- 4th place Global X-Games San Antonio, TX Park
- 1st place Global X-Games San Antonio, TX Park

=== 2002 ===
- 3rd place X-Trails Dallas, TX Park
- 1st place X-Trails Atlanta, USA Park
- 1st place European X-Games Barcelona, Spain Park
- 1st place European Championships Rome, Italy Park
- 2nd place European Championships Rome, Italy Halfpipe

=== 2001 ===
- 1st place ASA Baltimore, USA Park
- 2nd place ASA Rome, Italy Park
- 4th place X-Games Philadelphia, USA Park
- 3rd place European X-Games Barcelona, Spain Park
- 4th ASA Finals World Championships Dallas, TX Park

=== 2000 ===
- 1st place X-Trails St. Petersburg, FL Park
- 1st place X-Trails Nashville Park
- 1st place X-Games San Francisco, CA Park
- 1st place X-Games Melbourne, Australia Park
- 1st place Gravity Games Rhode Island, PR Park
- 1st place YOZ Games Munich, Germany Park
- 1st place ASA Ontario, CA Park
- 1st place ASA Hermosa Beach, CA Park
- 1st place ASA Finals World Championships Las Vegas, NV Park

=== 1999 ===
- 1st place Gravity Games Rhode Island, PR Park
- 1st place X-Games San Francisco, CA Park
- 1st place Dutch Championships Halfpipe
- 2nd place IISS Rome, Italy Park
- 1st place ASA Stockholm, Sweden Park
- 1st place ASA Toronto, Canada Park
- 1st place European Championships Park

=== 1998 ===
- 1st place Dutch championships Park
- 1st place IISS Saas Fee, Switzerland Park
- 1st place IISS Tignes, France Park
- 1st place NISS Finals Venice Beach, CA Park
- 1st place IISS Finals Birmingham, UK Park
- 3rd place ASA Naples, FL Park
- 2nd place ASA Flensburg, Germany Park
- 1st place ASA Toronto, Canada Park
- 3rd place X-Games San Diego, CA Halfpipe triples

=== 1997 ===
- 1st place Dutch Championships Halfpipe
- 3rd place Lausanne contest Halfpipe
- Overall winner IISS Finals Amsterdam

=== 1996 ===
- 2nd place Dutch Championships Park
- 5th place Dutch Championships Halfpipe
- 1st place Skate 96 Rotterdam Ahoy Park

=== 1995 ===
- 3rd place Dutch Championships Park
