= Thomas Frye (disambiguation) =

Thomas Frye (c.1710–1762) was an Anglo-Irish painter.

Tom or Thomas Frye may also refer to:

- Thomas Frye (Rhode Island governor) (1666–1748), Colonial American official
- Thomas Frye Lewis Evans (1845–1920), Canadian Anglican priest
- Tom Frye, American exhibition shooting champion in 1959
- Charles Thomas Frye (born 1981), American football quarterback
- Channing Thomas Frye (born 1983), American basketball power forward

== See also ==
- Thomas Fry (disambiguation)
