= Takeshi Yasutoko =

Japanese professional vert skater (born 1986)

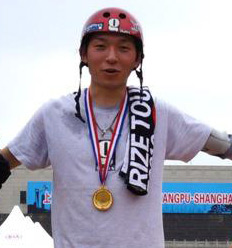
- Takeshi Yasutoko in 2012

Personal information
- Nationality: Japanese
- Born: 25 June 1986 (age 40) Kobe, Japan
- Height: 5 ft 5 in (1.65 m)
- Weight: 130 lb (59 kg)

Sport
- Sport: Vert Skater
Medal record
X-Games
Representing Japan
Gold medal – first place	2010 Shanghai, China	Vert
Gold medal – first place	2008 Shanghai, China	Vert
Gold medal – first place	2007 Dallas, TX, USA	Vert
Gold medal – first place	2007 San Diego, CA, USA	Vert
Gold medal – first place	2007 Montpellier, France	Vert
Gold medal – first place	2007 Shanghai, China	Vert
Gold medal – first place	2006 Dallas, TX, USA	Vert
Gold medal – first place	2006 San Diego, CA, USA	Vert
Gold medal – first place	2006 Paris, France	Vert
Gold medal – first place	2006 Amsterdam, Netherlands	Vert
Gold medal – first place	2006 Richmond, VA, USA	Vert
Gold medal – first place	2005 Pomona, CA, USA	Vert
Gold medal – first place	2005 Munich, Germany	Vert
Gold medal – first place	2005 Cincinnati, OH, USA	Vert
Gold medal – first place	2004 Beijing, China	Vert
Gold medal – first place	2005 Milwaukee, Wisconsin	Vert
Silver medal – second place	2006 Birmingham, England	Vert
Silver medal – second place	2006 Kuala Lumpur, Malaysia	Vert
Silver medal – second place	2005 Manchester, England	Vert
Bronze medal – third place	2006 Berlin, Germany	Vert

Takeshi Yasutoko (born June 25, 1986 in Kobe) is a Japanese professional vert skater. In 1995 Takeshi became the youngest professional Vert Skater to turn pro at the age of nine, and at age 11 became the youngest athlete to compete at X Games. He was the first male skater to win three X Games gold medals, and was the 2003 top-ranked vert skater by the Aggressive Skaters Association (ASA).

His brother is professional vert skater Eito Yasutoko.

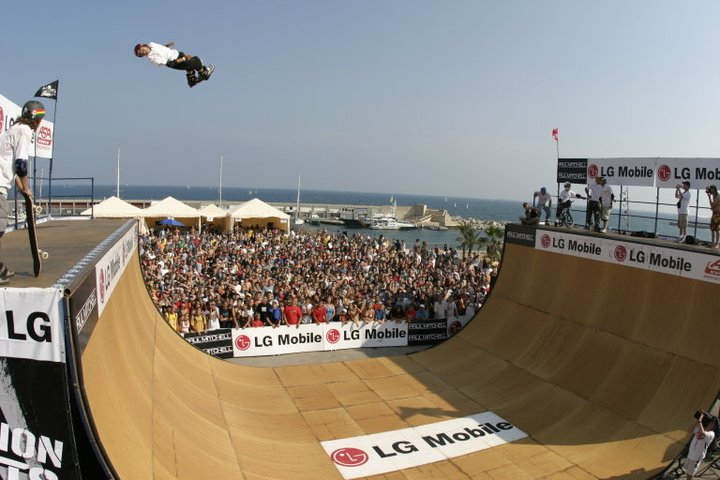
Takeshi Vert Skating in 2012

== Vert Competitions ==
- 2024 World Skate Games, Roma, Italia - Roller Freestyle Vert: Gold
- 2022 World Skate Games, Buenos Aires, Argentina - Roller Freestyle Vert: Gold
- 2016 British inline championship, Corby UK - Vert : 1st place
- 2014 Asian X Games, Shanghai, China - Vert: Gold
- 2013 Asian X Games, Shanghai, China - Vert: Silver
- 2012 Asian X Games, Shanghai, China - Vert: Gold
- 2011 Asian X Games, Shanghai, China - Vert: Gold
- 2010 Asian X Games, Shanghai, China - Vert: Gold
- 2008 Asian X Games, Shanghai - Vert: 1st
- 2007 LG Action Sports World Championships, Dallas, TX - Vert: Gold Medalist
- 2007 Action Sports World Tour, San Diego, CA - Vert: 1st
- 2007 Nokia Fise, Montpellier, France - Vert: 1st
- 2007 Asian X Games, Shanghai - Vert: 1st
- 2006 LG Action Sports World Championships, Dallas, TX - Vert: 1st
- 2006 Action Sports US Vert Championship, San Diego, CA - Vert: 1st
- 2006 LG Action Sports World Tour, Paris, France - Vert: 1st
- 2006 LG Action Sports World Tour, Berlin, Germany - Vert: 3rd
- 2006 LG Action Sports World Tour, Birmingham, England - Vert: 2nd
- 2006 LG Action Sports World Tour, Amsterdam, Netherlands - Vert: 1st
- 2006 Action Sports World Tour, Richmond, VA - Vert: 1st
- 2006 Asian X Games, Kuala Lumpur, Malaysia - Vert: 2nd
- 2005 LG Action Sports World Championship, Manchester, England - Vert: 2nd
- 2005 LG Action Sports US Championship, Pomona, CA - Vert: 1st
- 2005 LG Action Sports Tour, Moscow, Russia - Vert: 10th
- 2005 LG Action Sports Tour, Munich, Germany - Vert: 1st
- 2005 Mobile Skatepark Series, Cincinnati, OH: 1st
- 2004 Pro Tour Year-End Ranking (Vert): 1st
- 2004 LG Action Sports Asian Tour, Shanghai & Seoul: 1st, Beijing, China: 2nd
- 2004 LG Action Sports Championships - World Championships - Vert: 1st
- 2004 X Games - Vert: Gold Medalist
- 2004 Asian X Games - Vert: Gold Medalist
- 2003 Pro Tour Year-End Ranking (Vert): 3rd
- 2003 X Games - Vert: Silver Medalist
- 2003 AIL - Vert: 1
- 2002 Pro Tour Year-End Ranking (Vert): 1st
- 2002 X Games - Vert: Gold Medalist
- 2001 ASA World Championships - Vert: Silver Medalist
- 2001 Gravity Games - Vert: Silver Medalist
- 2001 X Games - Vert: Silver Medalist
- 2000 Pro Tour Year-End Ranking (Vert): 2nd
- 1999 AIL - Vert: 8
- 1999 AIL - Vert Triples: 3
- 1998 AIL - Vert: 14
- 1998 AIL - Vert Triples: 5
