= Matt Salerno =

Australian inline skater (born 1978)

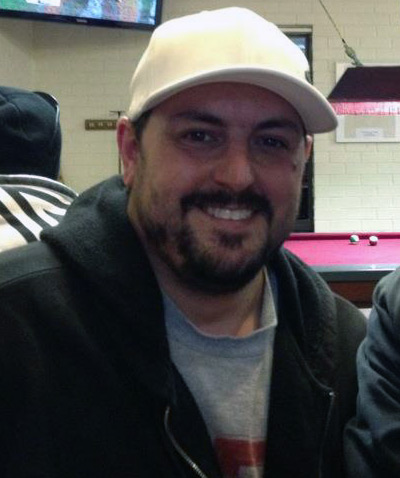

Personal information
- Nationality: Australian
- Born: September 4, 1978 (age 47) Sydney, Australia
- Height: 5 ft 7 in (170 cm)
- Weight: 140 lb (64 kg)

Sport
- Sport: Vert skating
Medal record
Competitions
Representing Australia
Silver medal – second place	2000 Melbourne, Australia	Vert
Gold medal – first place	2000 Nashville, TN, USA	Vert
Silver medal – second place	1999 Boulder, CO, USA	Vert
Gold medal – first place	1999 Ft. Myers, FL, USA	Vert
Bronze medal – third place	1999 Richmond, VA, USA	Vert
Bronze medal – third place	1999 Summer X Games	Vert
Silver medal – second place	1998 Summer X Games	Vert
Gold medal – first place	1997 Naples, FL, USA	Vert
Gold medal – first place	1996 Lausanne Lausanne	Vert

Matt Salerno is an Australian former professional inline skater and four times world champion. Salerno was famous for his style and his unrestricted skating ability and won both vert and street competitions. Salerno started skating very young, turned professional in 1996 and still skates to this day. He was a big influence in the vert skating style.

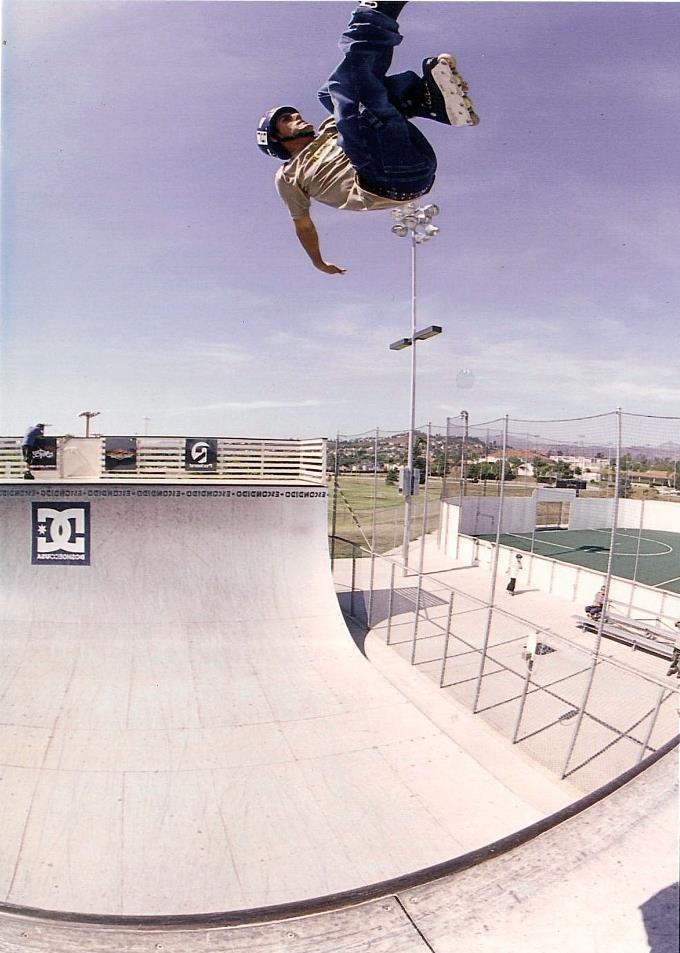
Salerno vert skating

== Vert competitions ==
- 2000 Australian Inline Skating Championships Melbourne, Australia Vert 2
- 2000 Asa Hermosa Beach, CA Vert 6
- 2000 X Trials Nashville, TN Vert 1
- 2000 X Trials St. Petersburg, FL Street 2
- 2000 X Trials St. Petersburg, FL Vert 5
- 1999 ASA Boulder, CO Street 2
- 1999 ASA Boulder, CO Vert 2
- 1999 ASA World Championships Ft. Myers, FL Street 4
- 1999 ASA World Championships Ft. Myers, FL Vert 1
- 1999 Gravity Games Providence, RI Vert 6
- 1999 X Trials Richmond, VA Street 3
- 1999 X Trials Richmond, VA Vert 1
- 1999 Summer X Games Street 4
- 1999 Summer X Games Vert 3
- 1999 Summer X Games Vert Triples 2
- 1998 Asa Overall Overall 1
- 1998 Asa World Championships Las Vegas Street 1
- 1998 Goodwill Games New York Street 1
- 1998 X Trials Virginia Beach Vert 1
- 1998 Summer X Games Vert 2
- 1998 Summer X Games Vert Triples 2
- 1997 ASA Overall Champion Vert 1
- 1997 ASA World Championships Naples, FL Vert 1
- 1996 Lausanne Lausanne, Sui Vert 1
- 1995 Summer X Games Vert 6
- 1995 Summer X Games Street 1
