= Vert (sport) =

Competition in extreme sports

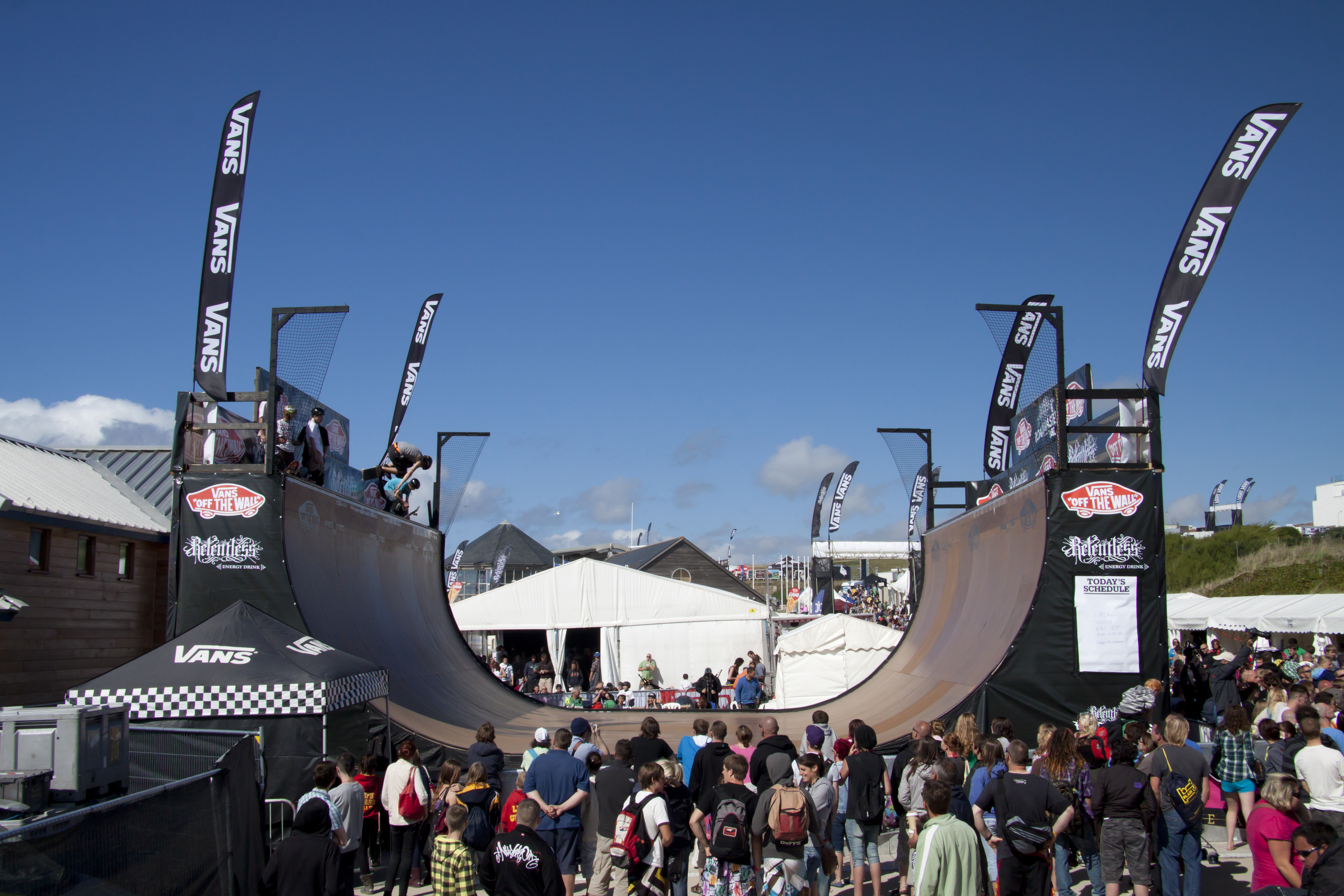
The Vert ramp at the 2010 Boardmasters Festival during the first skateboard free practice session.

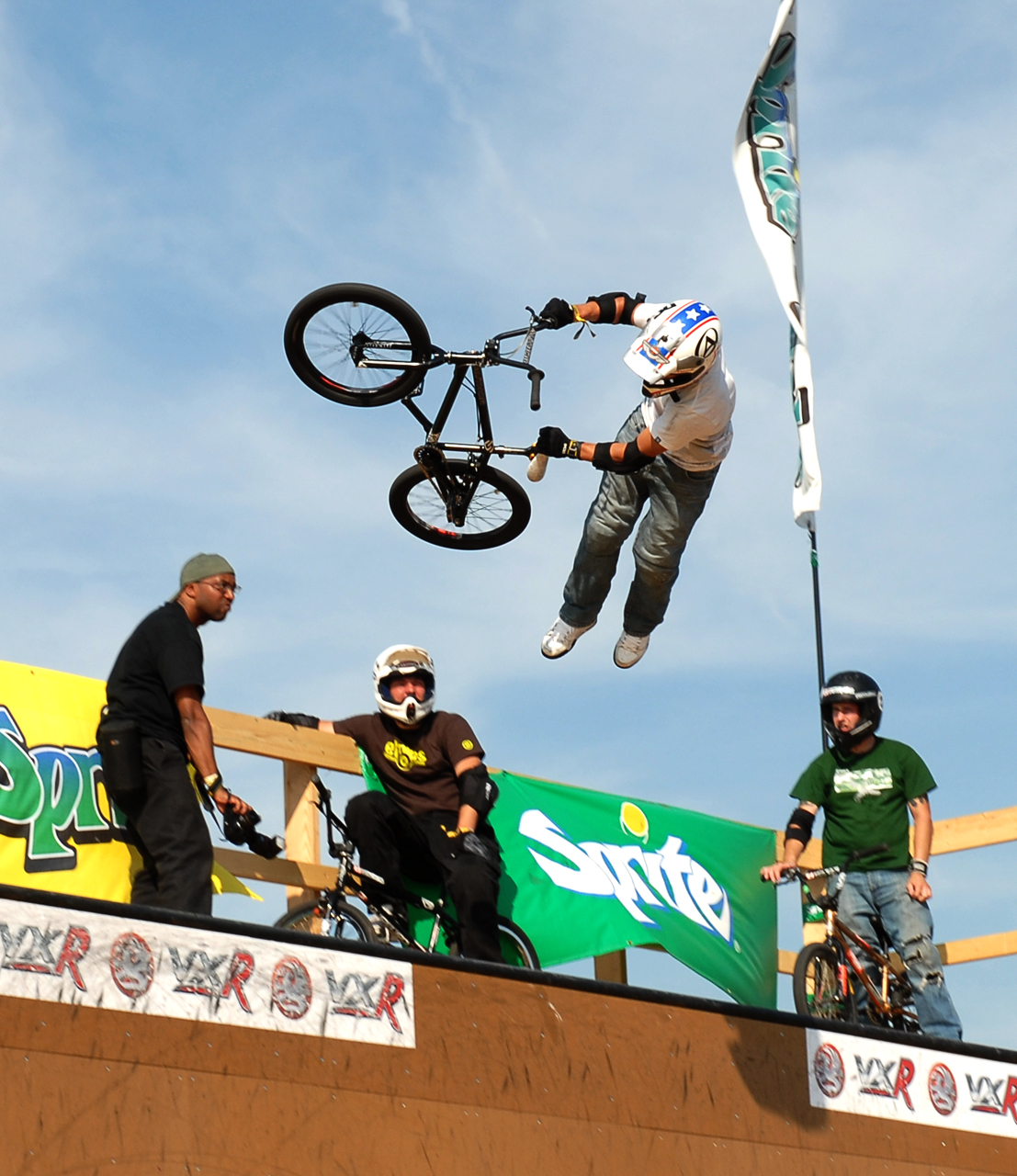
BMX vert jump

Vert is a term used in extreme sports especially vert skating, vert skateboarding, snowboarding and BMX to denote a competition held on a vert ramp which allows the competitors to fly into the air and land back on the ramp. This time in the air allows the competitor to perform moves which would otherwise be extremely difficult. An example of this would be a flip, or a spin.

The term itself comes from the word "vertical," the direction in which the competitor is moving after leaving the ramp.

Ramps used in these events are usually vert ramps.

Outside of competitions, the term vert is not normally used. Instead, the specific type of ramp is denoted. So instead of saying "I am going to go ride vert," one might say "I am going to go ride a half-pipe." However, it would be correct to say "in competitions, I usually ride vert," in order to differentiate from other forms of competition (such as freestyle, park or street).

ESPN's X Games initially eliminated vert from its 2008 competition, due to declining ratings over the last few years, but because of a proposed boycott of the "Big Air" event, mainly by the professional skateboarders, it was reinstated.

== See also ==
- Superpipe
- World Skate Games
