= Eito Yasutoko =

Japanese professional vert skater (born 1983)

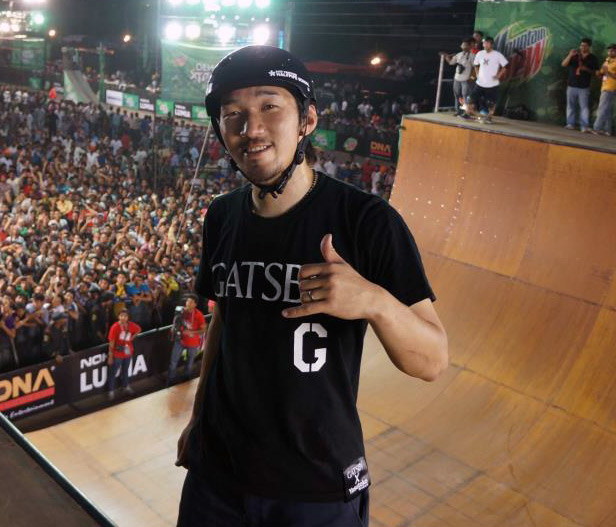

Personal information
- Nationality: Japanese
- Born: July 29, 1983 (age 42) Kobe, Japan
Medal record
Summer X Games
Representing Japan
Gold medal – first place	2010 Games ChunCheon	Vert
Gold medal – first place	2005 Manchester, England	Vert
Gold medal – first place	2005 Moscow, Russia	Vert
Gold medal – first place	2003 Gravity Games	Vert
Gold medal – first place	1999 X Games	Vert
Silver medal – second place	2012 Asia, Shanghai	Vert
Silver medal – second place	2008 Asia, Shanghai	Vert
Silver medal – second place	2006 Richmond, VA, USA	Vert
Silver medal – second place	2006 Kuala Lumpur, Malaysia	Vert
Silver medal – second place	2005 Pomona, CA, USA	Vert
Silver medal – second place	2005 Munich, Germany	Vert
Bronze medal – third place	2010 Shanghai, China	Vert
Bronze medal – third place	2007 Dallas, TX, USA	Vert
Bronze medal – third place	2007 San Diego, CA, USA	Vert
Bronze medal – third place	2007 Shanghai, China	Vert

Eito Yasutoko (安床栄人, Yasutoko Eito; born 29 July 1983) is a Japanese professional vert skater. Eito won a gold medal at the 2003 Gravity Games and a gold medal at the 2005 X Games in England.

His brother is professional vert skater Takeshi Yasutoko.

Best Tricks Twister, 1080 California Roll, Double backflip 180.

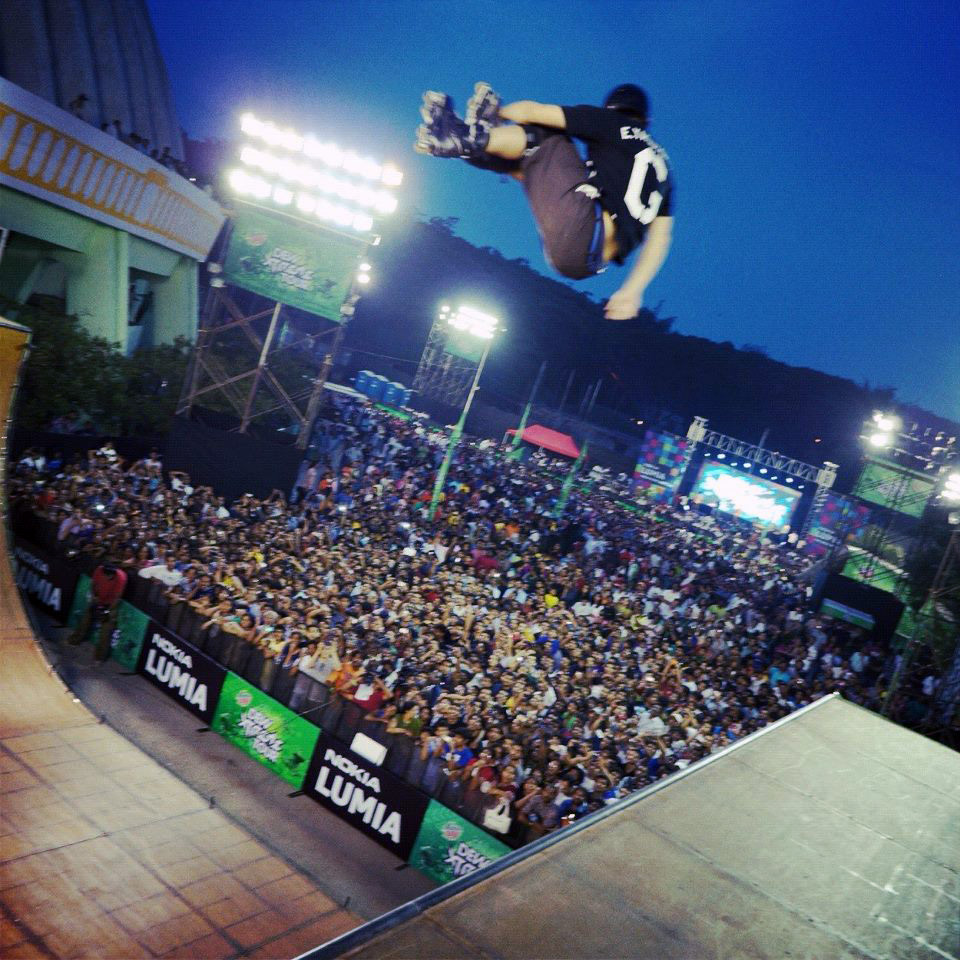
Eito Vert Skating in India

== Vert Competitions ==
- 2014 Asian X Games, Shanghai, China - Vert: Silver
- 2013 Asian X Games, Shanghai, China - Vert: Gold
- 2010 Asian X Games, Shanghai, China - Vert: Bronze
- 2008 Asian X Games, Shanghai - Vert: 2nd
- 2007 LG Action Sports World Championships, Dallas, TX - Vert: Bronze Medalist
- 2007 Action Sports World Tour, San Diego, CA - Vert: 3rd
- 2007 Asian X Games, Shanghai - Vert: 3rd
- 2006 LG Action Sports World Championships, Dallas, TX - Vert: 9th
- 2006 LG Action Sports World Tour, Birmingham, England - Vert: 4th
- 2006 LG Action Sports World Tour, Amsterdam, Netherlands - Vert: 8th
- 2006 Action Sports World Tour, Richmond, VA - Vert: 2nd
- 2006 Asian X Games, Kuala Lumpur, Malaysia - Vert: 1st
- 2005 LG Action Sports World Championship, Manchester, England: 1st
- 2005 LG Action Sports US Championship, Pomona, CA - Vert: 2nd
- 2005 LG Action Sports World Tour, Munich, Germany - Vert: 2nd
- 2005 LG Action Sports World Tour, Moscow, Russia - Vert: 1st
- 2004 Pro Tour Year-End Ranking - Vert: 2
- 2004 LG Action Sports Asian Tour, Beijing, China: 1st, Shanghai & Seoul: 2nd
- 2004 LG Action Sports Championships - World Championships - Vert: 5th
- 2004 X Games - Vert: Bronze Medalist
- 2004 Asian X Games: Silver Medalist
- 2003 Pro Tour Year-End Ranking (Vert): 1
- 2003 LG Action Sports Championships - World Championships - Vert: 1st
- 2003 Gravity Games - Vert: Gold Medalist
- 2003 X Games - Vert: Gold Medalist
- 2003 AIL - Vert: 2
- 2002 X Games - Vert: Silver Medalist
- 2001 ASA World Championships - Vert: Bronze Medalist
- 2001 AIL - Vert: 4
- 2000 X Games - Vert: Gold Medalist
- 1999 AIL - Vert: 1
- 1999 AIL - Vert Triples: 3
- 1998 AIL - Vert: 4
- 1998 AIL - Vert Triples: 5
