= Cesar Mora (skater) =

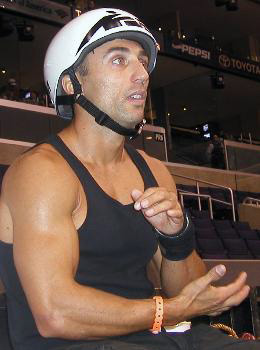

Personal information
- Nationality: Australian
- Born: February 3, 1975 (age 51) Madrid, Spain
- Occupation: Vert skater
- Height: 5 ft 5 in (165 cm)
Medal record
Competitions
Representing Australia
Silver medal – second place	2003 Los Angeles, CA, USA	Vert
Silver medal – second place	2001 Sydney, Australia	Vert
Bronze medal – third place	2000 Lake Havasu, AZ, USA	Vert
Silver medal – second place	2000 Louisville, KY, USA	Vert
Gold medal – first place	1999 Boulder, CO, USA	Vert
Gold medal – first place	1999 Oceanside, CA, USA	Vert
Gold medal – first place	1999 Portland, OR, USA	Vert
Bronze medal – third place	1999 Providence, RI, USA	Vert
Silver medal – second place	1999 Richmond, VA, USA	Vert
Gold medal – first place	1998 Las Vegas, NV, USA	Vert
Silver medal – second place	1998 Virginia Beach, VA, USA	Vert
Silver medal – second place	1995 X Games	Vert

Cesar Mora (born February 3, 1975) is an Australian professional vert skater. His X Games career included multiple medals.

== Early life ==
Born in Madrid, Spain, Mora moved to Sydney, Australia. Before becoming a professional skater, he played youth soccer for Australia. He later trained with Spanish football club Rayo Vallecano after spending time in the United States and England. Upon returning to Sydney, Mora began skating at Bondi Beach.

== Career ==
Mora achieved a number one ranking multiple times in vert skating. He skated for Roces Skates from 1994 to 1998, and then for K2 Skates from 1999 to 2004.

In 1998, Mora was the first skater to land a 1080° in competition. That same year, he also landed the first reverse 1260°.

In 2000, Mora took a short break from competition after a fall at the Melbourne Planet X Games resulted in a broken arm and wrist.

In 2003, Mora appeared in the video game Rolling alongside other prominent vert skaters.

== Vert Competitions ==
- 1995 X Games - Providence - 2nd
- 1995 ASA Pro Tour - Chicago - 1st
- 1995 ASA Pro Tour - CA-2nd
- 1995 ASA Pro Tour - New York - 2nd
- 1995 ASA Pro Tour Champion
- 1995 NISS - Portland - 1st
- 1995 NISS Tour Finals - Venice Beach - 1st
- 1996 ASA Pro Tour - Miami - 1st
- 1996 Ultimate Inline Challenge, Universal Studios - Orlando - 3rd
- 1996 NISS Tour Finals - Huntington Beach - 3rd
- 1996 NISS - Miami - 2nd
- 1996 IISS - Cairns - 1st
- 1996 Tour of South America
- 1997 Tour of Thailand
- 1997 Tour of South America
- 1997 NISS - Tour Finals - Santa Monica -2nd
- 1997 ASA Pro Tour - Boston - 1st
- 1997 Planet X Games - Gold Coast - 2nd
- 1997 Ultimate Inline Challenge, Universal Studios - Orlando - 2nd
- 1997 MTV Sports and Music Festival - Austin, Texas - 1st
- 1997 ASA Pro Tour Finals - Florida - 3rd
- 1998 ASA Pro Tour - Ontario - 2nd
- 1998 ASA Pro Tour - Virginia Beach - 2nd
- 1998 ASA Pro Tour - Boston 1st
- 1998 X-Air Hamilton, NZ - 1st
- 1998 ASA World Pro Tour Champion
- 1998 ASA World Pro Tour Finals - Las Vegas - 1st
- 1998 ASA Pro Tour - Colorado - 1st
- 1998 X Games - San Diego - 1st
- 1998 Planet X Games - Brisbane - 1st
- 1998 Australian Titles - 1st
- 1998 Texas Ho Down - 1st
- 1998 NISS - New York - 2nd
- 1998 K2 Challenge - Vert - 1st
- 1998 K2 Challenge - High Air - 1st
- 1998 Skaters Choice Winner
- 1998 ESPN B3 - Woodward - 2nd
- 1998 Ultimate Inline Challenge - Orlando - 3rd
- 1998 IISS - Puerto Rico - 1st
- 1999 IISS - Puerto Rico - 2nd
- 1999 NISS - Huntington Beach - 1st
- 1999 X Games - San Francisco - 2nd
- 1999 ESPN B3 - Oceanside - 1st
- 1999 ESPN B3 - Portland - 1st
- 1999 ESPN B3 - Kentucky - 2nd
- 1999 Judges Choice Winner
- 1999 Number 1 Ranked Skater
- 1999 Gravity Games - Providence - 3rd
- 1999 Levi's Anti Drug High School Tour USA
- 2000 X Games - San Francisco - 3rd
- 2000 Number 1 Ranked Skater
- 2000 ESPN B3 - Louisville - 2nd
- 2000 ESPN B3 - Lake Havasu - 3rd
- 2001 Planet X Games - Sydney - 2nd
- 2003 ASA Pro Tour - Los Angeles - 3rd
- 2003 ASA Pro Tour - Milwaukee - Vert: - 3rd
- 2003 X-Air Hamilton - NZ - 2nd
- 2003 ASA Pro Tour - Milwaukee, WI: - 2nd
- 2003 ASA Pro Tour - Los Angeles - 3rd
- 2003 Kellogg's USA Tour
- 2004 Asian X Games - Malaysia - 2nd
- 2007 Vodafone X-Air, Wellington, New Zealand - 3rd
