= Marc Englehart =

American professional vert skater

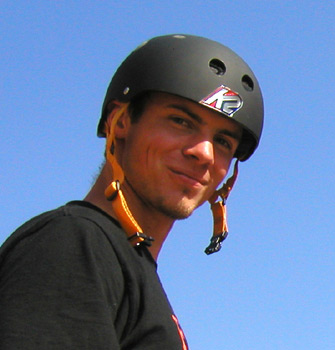

Personal information
- Nationality: American
- Born: February 27, 1983 (age 43) Sellersville, Pennsylvania, United States
- Height: 5 ft 10 in (178 cm)

Sport
- Sport: Vert skating
Medal record
X Games
Representing United States
Silver medal – second place	2007 San Diego, CA, US	Vert
Gold medal – first place	2007 Wellington, New Zealand	Vert
Silver medal – second place	2006 Dallas, TX, US	Vert
Silver medal – second place	2006 San Diego, CA, US	Vert
Silver medal – second place	2006 Berlin, Germany	Vert
Bronze medal – third place	2006 Amsterdam, Netherlands	Vert
Bronze medal – third place	2006 Richmond, VA, US	Vert
Bronze medal – third place	2005 Cincinnati, OH, US	Vert
Bronze medal – third place	2005 Germany	Vert
Bronze medal – third place	2005 Sacramento, CA, US	Vert
Silver medal – second place	2004 Niagara Falls, NY, US	Vert
Bronze medal – third place	2003 US	Vert
Bronze medal – third place	2003 Dulles, VA, US	Vert
Silver medal – second place	2003 Buffalo, NY, US	Vert
Bronze medal – third place	2002 US	Vert
Bronze medal – third place	2002 X Games, US	Vert
Gold medal – first place	2002 Gravity Games, US	Vert
Bronze medal – third place	2002 MSS, US	Vert

Marc Englehart is an American professional vert skater. Englehart has earned many podium spots in his career, a gold medal in the 2002 Gravity Games, a silver medal in 2003 ASA Pro Tour, a silver medal in 2004 ASA Pro Tour, a silver medal in 2007 Action Sports World Tour and more.

Best Tricks Frontside 1080, Double Flatspin 540 and Flatspin 540 Snakebike

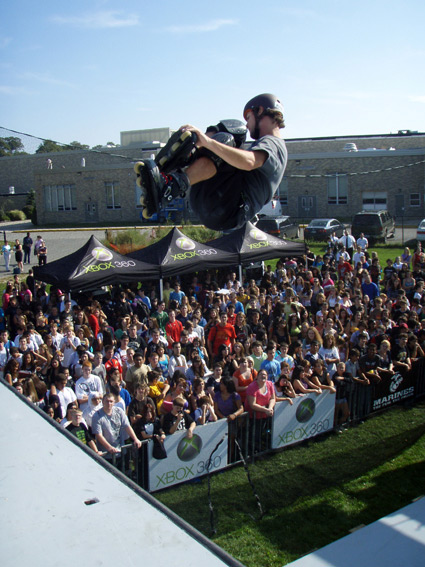
Marc Vert Skating

== Vert competitions ==
- 2008 LG Action Sports World Championships, Seattle, WA - Vert: 7th
- 2007 LG Action Sports World Championships, Dallas, TX - Vert: 4th
- 2007 Action Sports World Tour, San Diego, CA - Vert: 2nd
- 2007 Vodafone X-Air, Wellington, New Zealand - Vert: 1st
- 2006 LG Action Sports World Championships, Dallas, TX - Vert: 2nd
- 2006 Action Sports US Vert Championship, San Diego, CA - Vert: 2nd
- 2006 LG Action Sports World Tour, Paris, France - Vert: 5th
- 2006 LG Action Sports World Tour, Berlin, Germany - Vert: 2nd
- 2006 LG Action Sports World Tour, Birmingham, England - Vert: 9th
- 2006 LG Action Sports World Tour, Amsterdam, Netherlands - Vert: 3rd
- 2006 Action Sports World Tour, Richmond, VA - Vert: 3rd
- 2005 LG Action Sports World Championship, Manchester, England - Vert: 13th
- 2005 Mobile Skatepark Series, Cincinnati, OH: 3rd
- 2005 LG Action Sports Tour, Moscow, Russia: 7th
- 2005 LG Action Sports Tour, Germany: 3rd
- 2005 LG Action Sports Tour, Paris, France: 4th
- 2005 LG Action Sports Tour, Sacramento, CA: 3rd
- 2004 ASA Pro Tour Year-End Ranking (Vert): 4th
- 2004 LG Action Sports Championships - Vert: 4th
- 2004 ASA Pro Tour, Niagara Falls, NY - Vert: 2nd
- 2004 ASA Pro Tour, Cincinnati, OH - Vert: 4th
- 2003 Gravity Games: 3rd
- 2003 ASA Pro Tour, Dulles, VA: 3rd
- 2003 ASA Pro Tour, Buffalo, NY: 2nd
- 2002 ASA World Championships: 3rd
- 2002 ASA Pro Tour, Baltimore, MD: 4th
- 2002 ESPN X Games: 3rd
- 2002 Gravity Games: 1st
- 2002 MSS - Vert Sick Trick Rank: 3rd
- 2002 ASA Pro Tour, Cincinnati, OH: 5th
- 2002 ASA Pro Tour, Gwinnett County, GA: 5th
