= Ayumi Kawasaki =

Japanese vert skater

Ayumi Kawasaki 川崎アユミ
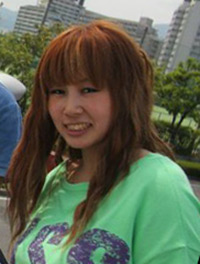

Personal information
- Native name: 川崎アユミ
- Nationality: Japanese
- Born: 27 July 1984 (age 42) Osaka, Japan
- Height: 5 ft 1 in (155 cm)
- Weight: 110 lb (50 kg)

Sport
- Sport: Aggressive inline skating
- Event: Vert
- Promotion: ASA Action Sports
- Turned pro: 1996
Medal record
X Games
Silver medal – second place	2001 Philadelphia	Women's AIL Vert
Silver medal – second place	2000 San Francisco	Women's AIL Vert
Gold medal – first place	1999 San Francisco	Women's AIL Vert
Silver medal – second place	1998 San Diego	Women's AIL Vert
Bronze medal – third place	1997 San Diego	Women's AIL Vert

Ayumi Kawasaki (Japanese: 川崎アユミ, romanized: Kawasaki Ayumi; born 27 July 1984) is a Japanese professional vert skater. She is the youngest person to ever medal in aggressive inline skating at the X Games, claiming bronze in the women's vert competition at the 1997 Summer X Games when she was twelve years old.

Kawasaki started skating when she was 9 in 1993 and turned professional in 1996. Kawasaki has attended and ranked high in many competitions in her vert skating career.

Best Tricks McTwist 1080, McTwist 900

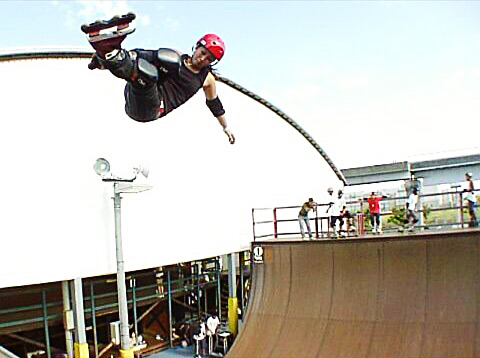
Ayumi Vert Skating

== Competitions ==
Competition	Location	Discipline	Rank
1997 X Games	San Diego, California	Women's vert	3rd place, bronze medalist(s)
1998 X Games	San Diego, California	Women's vert	2nd place, silver medalist(s)
1999 X Games	San Francisco, California	Women's vert	1st place, gold medalist(s)
2000 X Games	San Francisco, California	Women's vert	2nd place, silver medalist(s)
2001 X Games	Philadelphia, Pennsylvania	Women's vert	2nd place, silver medalist(s)
2004 ASA Pro Tour	Dulles, Virginia	Vert	8th
2005 LG Action Sports Tour	Sacramento, California	Vert	7th
2005 LG Action Sports Championships		Vert	9th
2005 X Games Asia	Kuala Lumpur	Vert	5th
2006 X Games Asia	Kuala Lumpur	Vert	4th
2006 Action Sports World Tour	Richmond, Virginia	Vert	5th
2006 LG Action Sports World Tour	Amsterdam	Vert	4th
2006 LG Action Sports World Tour	Birmingham	Vert	10th
2006 Action Sports US Vert Championship	San Diego, California	Vert	6th
2006 LG Action Sports World Championships	Dallas, Texas	Vert	10th
2007 X Games Asia	Shanghai	Vert	10th
2007 Action Sports World Tour	San Diego, California	Vert	9th
2007 LG Action Sports World Championships	Dallas, Texas	Vert	8th
2008 X Games Asia	Shanghai	Vert	
