= Elmer Pillon =

Canadian professional vert skater (born 1973)

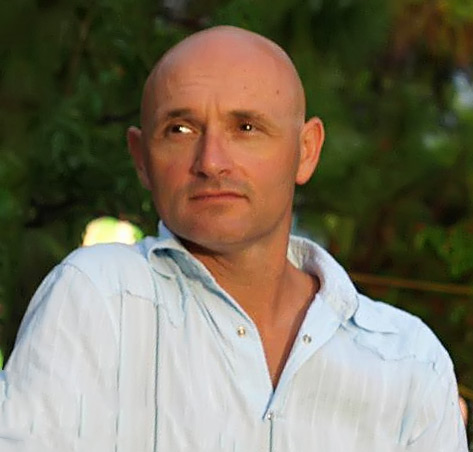

Personal information
- Born: May 1, 1973 (age 53) Toronto, Ontario, Canada

Sport
- Sport: Vert Skater
Medal record
X Games
Representing United States
Bronze medal – third place	2002 USA	Vert

Elmer Pillon is a Canadian professional vert skater. Pillon earned his professional status in 2002 with a Bronze medal. He also got a 12th place in the Pro Circuit in Los Angeles California in 2003. and was ranked number six in the world for Vert Skating in 2004 with 1161 points. Pillon has a degree in PTA and is currently working at his own Health Rehab located in Coral Springs, Florida.

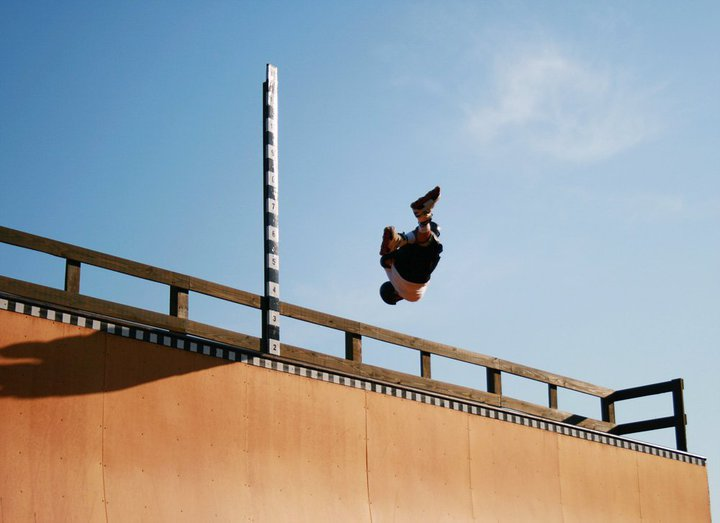
Elmer Pillon doing a Brainless 720 while Vert Skating

Best Tricks Liu-kang Brainless 720, Frontside Bio 1080

== Vert competitions ==
- 2006 Action Sports World Tour, Richmond, VA - Vert: 8th
- 2003 MSS, Buffalo, NY - Vert: 5
- 2003 MSS, Milwaukee, WI - Vert: 13th
- 2002 ASA World Championships, Los Angeles, CA - Vert: 3rd
