= Shane Yost =

Australian vert skater (born 1977)

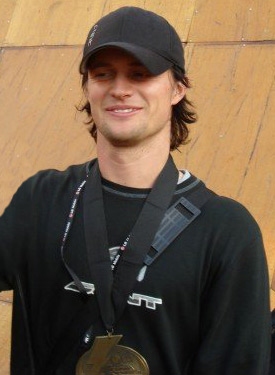

Personal information
- Nationality: Australian
- Born: 6 July 1977 (age 48) Launceston, Australia
- Height: 5 ft 8 in (173 cm)

Sport
- Sport: vert skating
Medal record
Summer X Games
Representing Australia
Silver medal – second place	2008 Seattle, WA, USA	Vert
Silver medal – second place	2008 Shanghai, China	Vert
Silver medal – second place	2007 Dallas, TX, USA	Vert
Bronze medal – third place	2007 Shanghai, China	Vert
Bronze medal – third place	2006 Dallas, TX, USA	Vert
Silver medal – second place	2006 Paris, France	Vert
Gold medal – first place	2006 Berlin, Germany	Vert
Gold medal – first place	2006 Birmingham, England	Vert
Silver medal – second place	2006 Amsterdam, Netherlands	Vert
Bronze medal – third place	2005 Manchester, England	Vert
Bronze medal – third place	2005 Moscow, Russia	Vert
Silver medal – second place	2003 Milwaukee, WI, USA	Vert
Silver medal – second place	2003 Cincinnati, OH, USA	Vert
Silver medal – second place	2003 Los Angeles, USA	Vert
Bronze medal – third place	2003 USA	Vert
Silver medal – second place	2002 USA	Vert
Silver medal – second place	2002 Baltimore, MD, USA	Vert
Bronze medal – third place	2002 USA	Vert
Bronze medal – third place	2002 USA	Vert
Bronze medal – third place	2001 USA	Vert
Gold medal – first place	2000 USA	Vert

Shane Yost is a retired Australian professional rollerblader and was the 2000 ASA number one ranked vert skater in the world. He was the first rollerblader to land a switch 1080 and the first skater to land a frontside 1260. Yost revolutionized the world of inline skating with his clean style and incredible flair.

Best Tricks Fakie 1080, First person to ever land a frontside 1260 in competition, Frontside Double 360 Garfunkel, First person to land a Fakie Garfunkel.

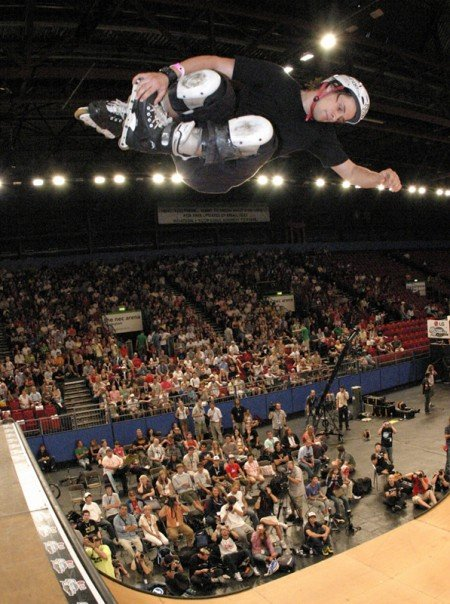
Shane roller blading

== Vert Competitions ==
- 2015 Australian Rolling Open, Canberra, ACT - Vert: Gold Medalist
- 2014 Australian Rolling Open, Geelong, VIC - Vert: Gold Medalist
- 2008 LG Action Sports World Championships, Seattle, WA - Vert: Silver Medalist
- 2008 Asian X Games, Shanghai - Vert: 3rd
- 2007 LG Action Sports World Championships, Dallas, TX - Vert: Silver Medalist
- 2007 Action Sports World Tour, San Diego, CA - Vert: 4th
- 2007 Asian X Games, Shanghai - Vert: 2nd
- 2007 Vodafone X-Air, Wellington, New Zealand - Vert: 2nd
- 2006 LG Action Sports World Championships, Dallas, TX - Vert: 3rd
- 2006 LG Action Sports World Tour, Paris, France - Vert: 2nd
- 2006 LG Action Sports World Tour, Berlin, Germany - Vert: 1st
- 2006 LG Action Sports World Tour, Birmingham, England - Vert: 1st
- 2006 LG Action Sports World Tour, Amsterdam, Netherlands - Vert: 2nd
- 2006 Action Sports World Tour, Richmond, VA - Vert: 4th
- LG Action Sports World Championship, Manchester, England - Vert: 3rd
- LG Action Sports World Tour, Moscow, Russia - Vert: 3rd
- 2003 ASA Pro Tour, Cleveland, OH: 6th
- 2003 ASA Pro Tour, Milwaukee, WI: 2nd
- 2003 ASA Pro Tour, Cincinnati, OH: 2nd
- 2003 ASA Pro Tour, Los Angeles, CA: 2nd
- 2003 World X Games: 3rd
- 2002 ASA World Championships: 2nd
- 2002 ASA Pro Tour, Baltimore, MD: 2nd
- 2002 Gravity Games: 3rd
- 2002 ASA Pro Tour, San Diego, CA: 4th
- 2002 ASA Pro Tour, Cincinnati, OH: 3rd
- 2001 X Games - Vert: Bronze Medalist
