= Rene Hulgreen =

Danish professional vert skater

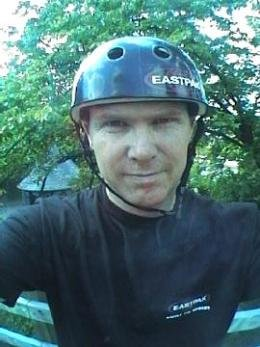

Personal information
- Nationality: Danish
- Born: March 21, 1970 (age 56) Glostrup, Denmark
Medal record
Competitions
Representing Denmark
Gold medal – first place	1997 Boston, MA, USA	Vert
Bronze medal – third place	1997 Dallas, TX, USA	Vert
Gold medal – first place	1997 Milan	Vert
Silver medal – second place	1996 European Cup	Vert
Gold medal – first place	1996 Vittel France	Vert
Gold medal – first place	1996 Swatch Lausanne	Vert
Gold medal – first place	1995 Swatch Lausanne	Vert
Gold medal – first place	1995 New York, NY, USA	Vert
Gold medal – first place	1995 Colorado, USA	Vert
Gold medal – first place	1994 Swatch Lausanne	Vert

Rene Hulgreen is a Danish former professional vert skater. Hulgreen started skating in 1988, when he was 18 years old, and invented many tricks during his career, including the Viking Flip (a method grab backflip 180).

Best Tricks Viking Flip, McTwist 900

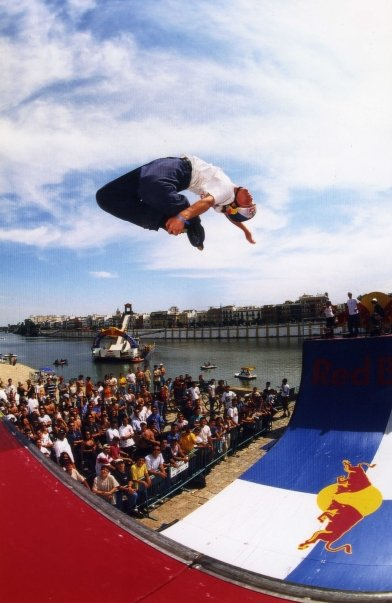
Rene Vert Skating

== Vert Competitions ==
- 1997 NISS Boston First Place
- 1997 NISS Dallas Third Place
- 1997 NISS Miami Fourth Place
- 1997 Ultimate lnllne Challenge Sixth Place
- 1997 Milan First Place Vert
- 1996 Europa Cup Second Place
- 1996 Vlttel France First Place Vert
- 1996 Swatch Lausanne First Place
- 1995 Swatch Lausanne First Place
- 1995 ASA NYC First Place
- 1995 Extreme Games Tenth Place Vert
- 1995 NISS Boulder: Colorado First Place
- 1994 Swatch Lausanne First Place Vert
- 1994 Swatch Lausanne First Place Street
- 3 Time Danish Vert Champion (1 w/inline. 2 wlquacl)
- 3 Time European Vert Champion (2 w/inline. 1 wlquad)
