= Leo Riot =

American vert skater and software engineer (born 1984)

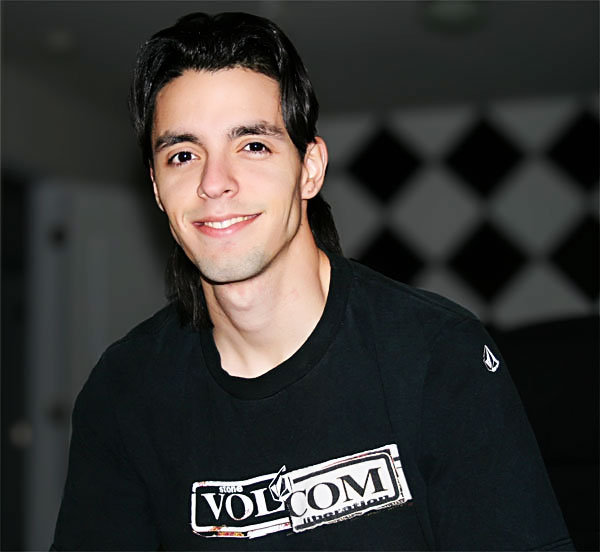
- Riot performing on a vert ramp

Personal information
- Nationality: American
- Born: December 3, 1984 (age 41) Miami, Florida, United States
- Occupations: Vert skater, software engineer, entrepreneur
Medal record
Competitions
Representing United States
Gold medal – first place	2004 Copper City, FL, USA	Vert

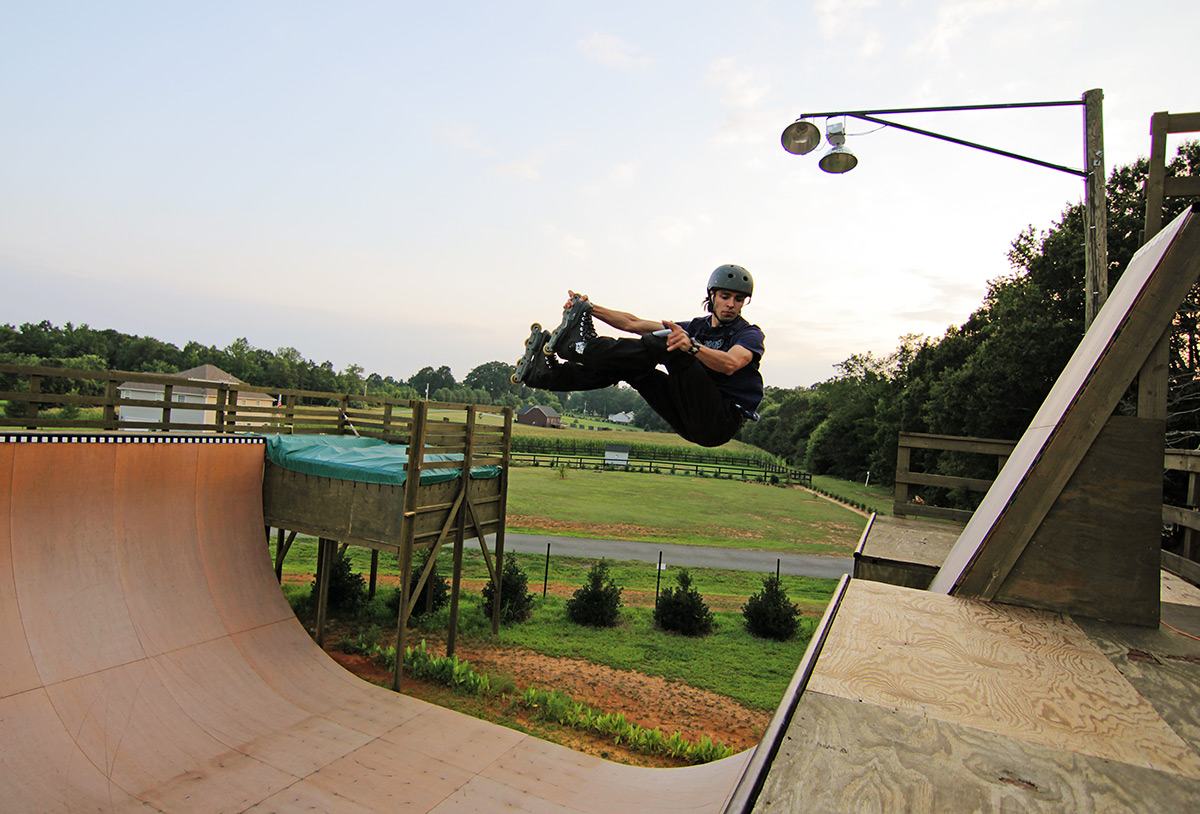
Riot doing a Flatspin while vert skating

Leo Riot (born December 3, 1984) is an American professional vert skater and technology entrepreneur known for constructing a full-scale backyard vert ramp in North Carolina and for competing internationally, including at X Games Shanghai 2014. Riot began skating in 1996 and turned professional in 2006.

== Early life ==
Riot was born in Miami, Florida, and began skating at age twelve in 1996.

== Backyard vert ramp ==
In 2009, Riot began building a backyard vert ramp after noting the nearest vertical facility was a two-hour drive away. The project took about nine months and resulted in a ramp approximately 13.5 feet high and 40 feet wide, comparable to X Games dimensions. The Enquirer-Journal covered the build and local response, describing the ramp's quality and the small community that formed around sessions at Riot's home.

== Competitive career ==
Riot turned professional in 2006 and competed in national and international vert events. He represented the United States in vert at X Games Shanghai 2014.

- 2005: 5th – ASA World Championships, Sacramento, California (Vert).
- 2004: 1st – Brian Piccolo Skatepark, Cooper City, Florida (Vert).

== Style and tricks ==
Riot is noted for advanced vert tricks including the fakie 1080 and flatspin 540.

== Technology and entrepreneurship ==
Outside of skating, Riot is a software engineer and entrepreneur. He began programming in 1998. He is the founder and chief technology officer of Day Traders, where he oversees technological innovation, software architecture, and operational efficiency.
