= Thumper Nagasako =

American professional vert skater (born 1983)

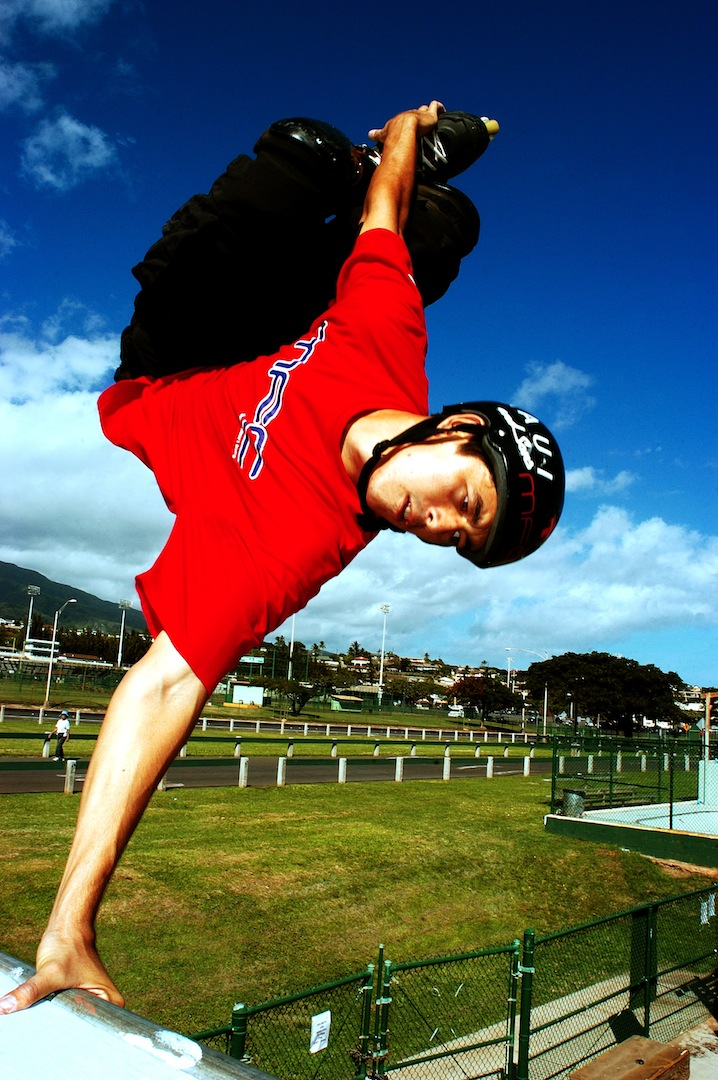

Personal information
- Born: April 13, 1983 (age 43) Wailuku, Hawaii, United States
- Height: 5 ft 11 in (180 cm)
- Weight: 185 lb (84 kg)

Sport
- Sport: Vert skating
Medal record
Competitions
Representing United States
Bronze medal – third place	2005 Berlin	Vert

Thumper Nagasako (born April 13, 1983) is an American professional vert skater. He placed 13th in vert skating in 2003 and 8th in 2004 at the X Games. Recently, Nagasako has remained dedicated to his passion for in-line skating, alongside managing his own video production company named HI FOCUSED.

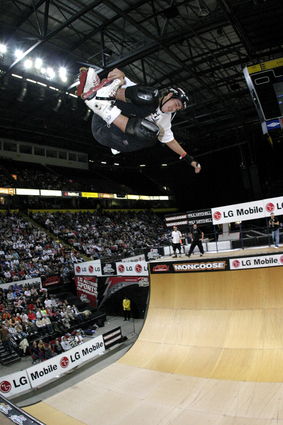
Thumper Vert Skating
