= Tom Fry (skater) =

Australian professional vert skater (born 1974)

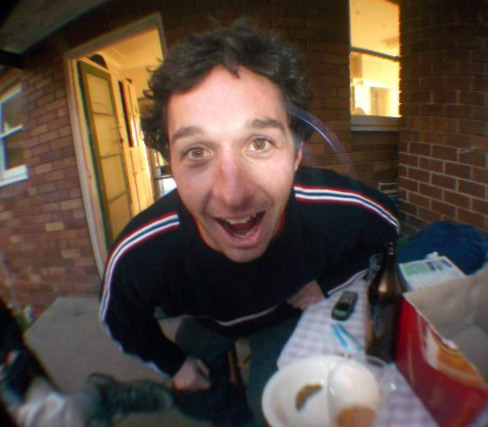

Personal information
- Born: 1974 (age 51–52) Hawthorne, Queensland, Australia
- Occupation: Vert skater
Medal record
Competitions
Representing Australia
Silver medal – second place	1996 X Games	Vert
Silver medal – second place	1996 ASA Vancouver	Vert
Bronze medal – third place	1996 Lausanne Swatch Aggressive	Vert
Silver medal – second place	1995 New York, USA	Vert
Gold medal – first place	1995 Rhode Island, USA	Vert
Silver medal – second place	1995 Lausanne World Finals	Vert
Silver medal – second place	1994 NISS World Championships	Vert
Gold medal – first place	1994 Australian Championship	Vert

Tom Fry is an Australian professional vert skater. He started skating when he was seventeen years old in 1991 and turned professional in 1995. Fry has won many competitions in his vert skating career.

== Vert competitions ==
- 1996 X Games, Second Place Vert
- 1996 ASA Vancouver, Second Place Vert
- 1996 Lausanne Swatch Aggressive, Third Place Vert
- 1996 Lausanne Swatch Aggressive, Tenth Place Street
- 1995 Destination Extreme, New York, Second Place Vert
- 1995 X Games, Rhode Island, Vert: 1st
- 1995 Lausanne World Finals, Second Place Vert
- 1994 NISS World Championships, Second Place Street
- 1994 NISS World Championships, Second Place Vert
- 1994 Australian Championship, First Place
