= Matt Lindenmuth =

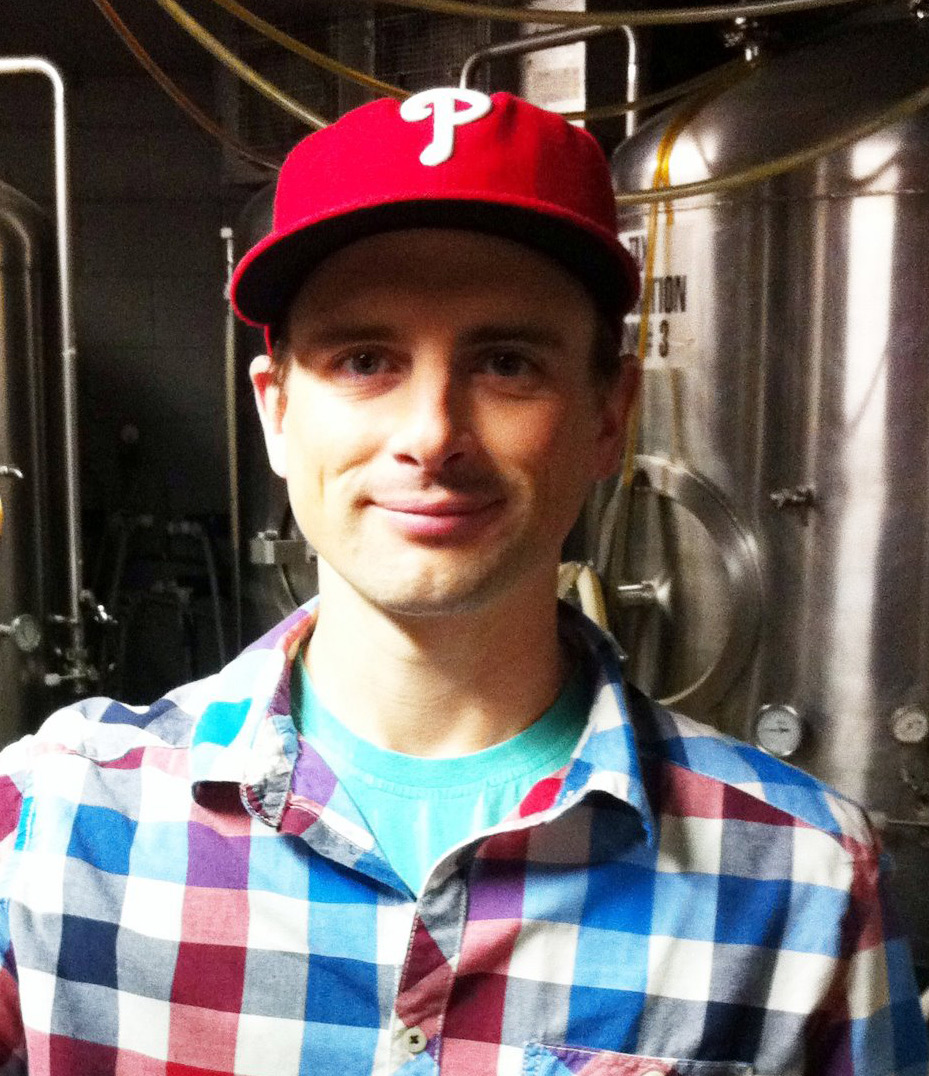

Personal information
- Nationality: American
- Born: March 1, 1981 (age 45) Allentown, Pennsylvania, United States

Sport
- Sport: vert skating
Medal record
Summer X Games
Representing United States
Bronze medal – third place	2006 USA	Vert
Bronze medal – third place	2001 USA	Vert
Bronze medal – third place	1999 Los Angeles, USA	Vert

Matt Lindenmuth (born March 1, 1981) is an American formerly top-ranked professional vert skater, as well as a professional snowboarder. He is most known for being the first action sports athlete in the world to do a double backflip on a vert ramp, often referred to as a "Double Lindy". At the 2002 Summer X-Games Lindenmuth attempted but failed to pull off the first ever triple backflip on a vert ramp.

Lindenmuth was born in Kutztown, Pennsylvania, He began inline skating with his family when he was 9 years old. At age 14, he joined the pro tour, and has been traveling and competing around the world since 1994. Lindenmuth has competed in ESPN's X Games, NBC's Gravity Games, AST Dew Tour, ASA Pro Tour, LG Word Tour and many other notable international events and competitions. He is the first inline athlete in the world to land a "Double Lindy" (a double back flip on the vert ramp) and the first action sport athlete to attempt triple back flips on the vert ramp.

In 2004 Lindenmuth also began competing in professional snowboard events including Vans Triple Crown, Vans Cup, Burton Global Open Series, World Superpipe Championships, and US Grand Prix, making him one of the few athletes to compete in multiple sports in both summer and winter X Games, Dew Tour and Gravity Games.

Since competing in the action sports world, Lindenmuth has taken his knowledge and work ethics in a different direction, brewing beer. He went on to establish and run Saucony Creek Brewing Company, an award-winning craft brewery and gastropub located in Kutztown, PA; and The Larimer Brewing in Chester, PA named after General William Larimer Jr.

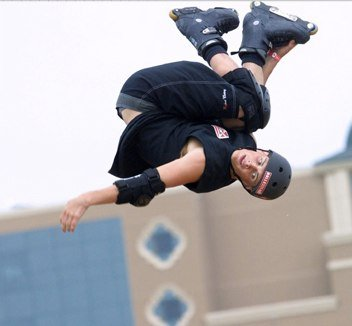
Lindenmuth vert skating

== Vert competitions ==
- 2008 LG Action Sports World Championships, Seattle, WA - Vert: 9th
- 2006 Action Sports US Vert Championship, San Diego, CA - Vert: 10th
- 2006 Action Sports World Tour, Richmond, VA - Vert: 7th
- 2005 LG Action Sports US Championship, Pomona - 5th
- 2003 ASA Pro Tour Year-End Ranking (Vert) - 19
- 2003 LG Action Sports Championships
- ASA World Championships Vert - 15th
- 2003 Gravity Games Vert - 13th
- 2003 X Games Vert 18th
- 2002 ASA Pro Tour, Baltimore - 9th
- 2002 ESPN X Games - 9th
- 2002 Gravity Games - 6th
- 2001 ASA World Championships - 5th
- 2001 Gravity Games - 3rd
