= Book of Cool =

Documentary television series

Book of Cool is a documentary television series created and owned by London-based producers Ocelot Productions. The main purpose is to publicly provide captured film footage of various exponents of sports and skills from around the world in action, as well as divulging some of the secrets behind the showcased skills.

== Awards ==
- While still in pre-launch stage, on 30 August 2005 the Book of Cool won a DVD Entertainment Award at the Entertainment Media Expo in Los Angeles for Best Television Special Interest
- At the May 2006 Webby Awards, it won all three People's Voice categories: Retail, Best navigation/structure and Best Use of Animation or Motion Graphics
