= Vert skating =

Sport discipline

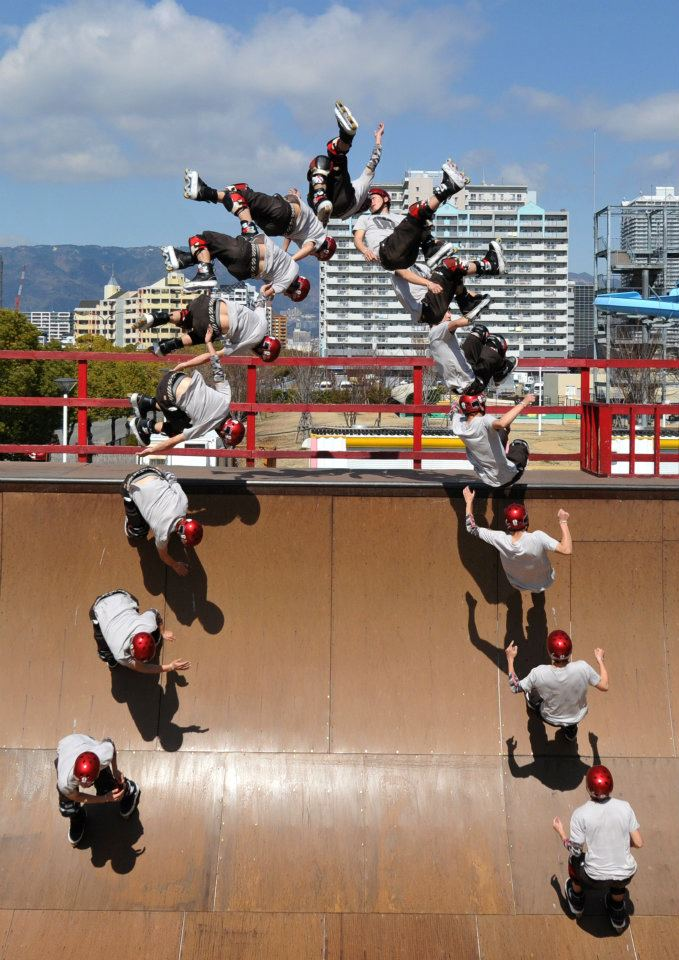
A sequence of still images has been stitched together to show the path taken by Takeshi Yasutoko doing an Alley-Oop Liu-Kang Flatspin 540

Vert skating or vertical skating is a discipline using skates like inline skates or roller skates on a vert ramp, a style of half-pipe. In vert skating, the skater is able to achieve more air-time as compared to other styles of skating, meaning skaters can perform complicated aerial maneuvers and acrobatic tricks, such as spins and flips.

The intent of vert skating is to ride higher than the coping (the metal pipe on top of the ramp) and perform spins or flips. It focuses on complicated aerial maneuvers, such as spins and flips. The intent of the skater is to build speed until they are of sufficient height above the edge of the ramp to perform various aerial acrobatics. In competitions skaters have limited time, often less than a minute, to impress the judges by landing numerous and difficult tricks, having a good flow and consistency, having creativity with the routine and most importantly having a good style.

The first X Games, in 1995, featured four inline skating events: best trick/big air, men's and women's vert, men's street, and men's downhill. At its heyday in 1998, inline skating had the most events of any sport at the X Games, featuring vert triples (a three-person team based vert event), women's street, and women's downhill in addition to the original events.

However, the sport soon fell out of fashion and by 2004, vert skating was the only remaining event at the X Games – including just one men's and women's combined contest. For the 2005 X Games, aggressive inline was dropped entirely and the vert competition was replaced by women's skateboarding.

Vert skating is considered a challenging sport: as of 2012 there are fewer than 15 professional vert skaters attending competitions.

== X Games results ==
=== Men's vert ===
Year	1st place, gold medalist(s)	2nd place, silver medalist(s)	3rd place, bronze medalist(s)
1995	Tom Fry (AUS)	Cesar Mora (AUS)	Manuel Billiris (AUS)
1996	Rene Hulgreen (DNK)	Tom Fry (AUS)	Chris Edwards (USA)
1997	Tim Ward (AUS)	Taïg Khris (FRA)	Chris Edwards (USA)
1998	Cesar Mora (AUS)	Matt Salerno (AUS)	Taïg Khris (FRA)
1999	Eito Yasutoko (JPN)	Cesar Mora (AUS)	Matt Salerno (AUS)
2000	Eito Yasutoko (JPN)	Takeshi Yasutoko (JPN)	Cesar Mora (AUS)
2001	Taïg Khris (FRA)	Takeshi Yasutoko (JPN)	Shane Yost (AUS)
2002	Takeshi Yasutoko (JPN)	Eito Yasutoko (JPN)	Marc Englehart (USA)
2003	Eito Yasutoko (JPN)	Takeshi Yasutoko (JPN)	Record not available

=== Women's vert ===
Year	1st place, gold medalist(s)	2nd place, silver medalist(s)	3rd place, bronze medalist(s)
1995	Tash Hodgeson (NZL)	Angie Walton (USA)	Laura Connery (USA)
1996	Fabiola da Silva (BRA)	Jodie Tyler (AUS)	Tash Hodgeson (NZL)
1997	Fabiola da Silva (BRA)	Claudia Trachsel (CH)	Ayumi Kawasaki (JPN)
1998	Fabiola da Silva (BRA)	Ayumi Kawasaki (JPN)	Maki Komori (JPN)
1999	Ayumi Kawasaki (JPN)	Fabiola da Silva (BRA)	Maki Komori (JPN)
2000	Fabiola da Silva (BRA)	Ayumi Kawasaki (JPN)	Merce Borrull (ESP)
2001	Fabiola da Silva (BRA)	Ayumi Kawasaki (JPN)	Record not available
2002	Records not available		
2003	Records not available		

=== Vert triples ===
Vert triples was a mixed-gender team AIL vert event and was included at two X Games, 1998 in San Diego and 1999 in San Francisco. Fabiola da Silva and Ayumi Kawasaki competed on a triples team with Andre Englehart in 1999. Maki Komori is the only woman to have medaled in vert triples at the X Games, winning bronze as part of a team with the Yasutoko brothers, Takeshi and Eito, in 1999.

Year	1st place, gold medalist(s)	2nd place, silver medalist(s)	3rd place, bronze medalist(s)
1998	Paul Malina (AUS); Sam Fogarty (AUS); Viorel Popa (USA)	Cesar Mora (AUS); Mike Budnik (USA); Matt Salerno (AUS)	Taïg Khris (FRA); Javier Bujanda (ESP); Sven Boekhorst (NLD)
1999	Taïg Khris (FRA); Javier Bujanda (ESP); Sven Boekhorst (NLD)	Cesar Mora (AUS); Mike Budnik (USA); Matt Salerno (AUS)	Takeshi Yasutoko (JPN); Eito Yasutoko (JPN); Maki Komori (JPN)

=== Vert ===
Men's and women's vert were combined at the 2004 X Games in Los Angeles. Fabiola da Silva was the only woman to qualify for participation in the event and placed sixth in the finals.

Year	1st place, gold medalist(s)	2nd place, silver medalist(s)	3rd place, bronze medalist(s)
2004	Takeshi Yasutoko (JPN)	Record not available	Eito Yasutoko (JPN)

== Other notable vert skaters ==
Skaters who participated in vert events at the X Games but did not medal or who participated at other major international events include:

- Aaron Feinberg (USA)
- Alberto Arakaki (BRA)
- Andre Englehart (USA)
- Anis Iboulalen (FRA)
- Beni Huber (SUI)
- Carl Hills (USA)
- Eitan Kramer (USA)
- Elmer Pillon (CAN)
- Jaren Grob (USA)
- Judy Eilmes (USA)
- Katie Brown (USA)
- Kerstin von Rautenfeld (BRA)
- Lamine Fathi (FRA)
- Leo Riot (USA)
- Leonid Kamburov
- Marco de Santi (BRA)
- Matt Lindenmuth (USA)
- Michelle Scott (USA)
- Mike Bennett (USA)
- Paul Malina (AUS)
- Randy Marino (USA)
- Rui Kitamura (JPN)
- Ryan Dawes (USA)
- Scott Crawford (AUS)
- Shawn Robertson (USA)
- Thumper Nagasako (USA)
- Tobias Bucher (GER)
- Vinicius Rosa (BRA)

== See also ==
- Half-pipe skiing
- Mega ramp
- Superpipe
