= X Games 3D: The Movie =

- Directed by: Steve Lawrence
- Written by: Gregg Jennings; Steve Lawrence
- Produced by: Phil Orlins
- Starring: Kyle Loza; Shaun White; Travis Pastrana; Ricky Carmichael; Danny Way; Bob Burnquist
- Narrated by: Emile Hirsch
- Cinematography: Matt Goodman
- Edited by: Todd Crites
- Music by: The Crystal Method
- Production company: ESPN Films
- Distributed by: Walt Disney Studios; Motion Pictures
- Release date: August 21, 2009
- Running time: 92 minutes
- Language: English
- Box office: $1,472,747

X Games 3D: The Movie is an action sports/documentary 3-D film released on August 21, 2009, for one week only. Produced by ESPN Films and distributed by Walt Disney Studios Motion Pictures, the film captures the drama and spectacle that plays out every year at the X Games, highlighting the behind-the-scenes stories of the featured athletes and the sacrifices they make in pursuit of glory and the advancement of their sports on the industry's biggest stage.

== Cast ==
- Travis Pastrana
- Bob Burnquist
- Danny Way
- Kyle Loza
- Shaun White
- Ricky Carmichael
- Jake Brown
- Brian Deegan
- Bucky Lasek
- Dave Mirra
- Tony Hawk (archive footage)
- Matt Hoffman (archive footage)
- Sal Masekela (commentator)
- Paul Page (commentator)
- Emile Hirsch (narrator)

== Music ==
The Crystal Method composed their third soundtrack, along with the American music composer, Tobias Enhus for the soundtrack for the film. Enhus has also composed soundtracks himself for such titles as Black Hawk Down, The Matrix: Path of Neo, and the Spider-Man 3 video game. In an interview, The Crystal Method said that they provided several of their songs for the film, including "Drown in the Now", which was used for the trailer of the movie. The other songs that they provided have been remixed exclusively for the film, such as a new remix of The Crystal Method's first single "Now Is the Time", and several songs from their Drive: Nike + Original Run album like "It's Time". A remix of "It's Time" is featured prominently on the official website of the film and is the first song that plays while viewing the website, followed by other songs, including the title track from Divided by Night.

== Promotion ==
ESPN itself promoted the film during their broadcast of X Games 15 with trailers and exclusive interviews with the athletes. The day before the release of X Games 3D, ESPN reaired events of X Games 15 as well as interviews with the athletes and celebrities that took place on the red carpet premiere outside the Nokia Theater. Online advertisements also helped promote the film with advertisements being seen on popular websites such as Yahoo!, MySpace, and YouTube.

== Reception ==
X Games 3D: The Movie was released in 1,399 theaters for a limited time of one week. The film opened in its only weekend at #19 at the box office making $837,216 and averaging $598 per theater. The film's total gross was $1,381,766.

Reviews from critics were mixed. As of April 2025, the film holds a 39% approval rating on Rotten Tomatoes, based on 28 reviews with an average rating of 5.04 out of 10. The site's consensus reads "Though fans of the event will likely enjoy X-Games 3D: The Movie, most will find it a poorly put together, skin deep, extended advertisement for the extreme sports competition."

== Home media ==
X Games 3D: The Movie was released in standard 2D version and retitled X Games: The Movie on DVD and Movie Download on January 12, 2010.
