= X Games XII =

2006 sporting event in Los Angeles

X Games Los Angeles 2006
- Venue: Staples Center; Home Depot Center; Long Beach Marine Stadium
- Location: Los Angeles, California; Long Beach, California
- Date: August 3-6

X Games XII (12) took place on August 3–6, 2006 in Los Angeles, California at the Staples Center, Home Depot Center and Long Beach Marine Stadium. It was broadcast on the ESPN networks and ABC.

== Results ==
=== Moto X Best Trick ===
Place	Athlete	Score
Gold	Travis Pastrana	98.60
Silver	Mat Rebeaud	93.80
Bronze	Blake Williams	91.80

=== Moto X Freestyle ===
Place	Athlete	Score
Gold	Travis Pastrana	94.20
Silver	Adam Jones	91.40
Bronze	Mike Mason	90.00

=== Moto X Step Up ===
Place	Athlete	Elimination Height
Gold	Matt Buyten	
Silver	Brian Deegan	23'0"
Silver	Jeremy McGrath	23'0"
4th	Myles Richmond	21'0"
4th	Tommy Clowers	21'0"

=== Moto X Super Moto ===
Place	Driver	Seconds Behind
Gold	Jeff Ward	
Silver	Mark Burkhart	0.572 secs
Bronze	Doug Henry	24.161 secs

=== Rally Super Special ===
Place	Driver/Co-Driver	Seconds Behind
Gold	(United States) Travis Pastrana/ (Sweden) Christian Edström	
Silver	(Scotland) Colin McRae/ (Wales) Nicky Grist	0.52 secs
Bronze	(United States) Ken Block/ (Italy) Alex Gelsomino	19.13 secs

=== BMX Big Air ===
Place	Athlete	Score
Gold	Kevin Robinson	95.00
Silver	Chad Kagy	93.66
Bronze	Allan Cooke	86.00

=== BMX Dirt ===
Place	Athlete	Score
Gold	Corey Bohan	91.66
Silver	Ryan Nyquist	91.33
Bronze	Anthony Napolitan	90.33

=== BMX Freestyle Park ===
Place	Athlete	Score
Gold	Scotty Cranmer	91.66
Silver	Morgan Wade	90.00
Bronze	Daniel Dhers	89.66

=== BMX Vert ===
Place	Athlete	Score
Gold	Chad Kagy	93.00
Silver	Jamie Bestwick	91.66
Bronze	Simon Tabron	90.00

=== BMX Vert Best Trick ===
Place	Athlete	Trick
Gold	Kevin Robinson	Double Flair
Silver	Chad Kagy	Double Tailwhip flat spin
Bronze	Simon Tabron	No handed Alley-Oop to Turn down 540

=== Men's Skateboard - Vert ===
Place	Athlete	Score
Gold	Sandro Dias	
Silver	Bob Burnquist	
Bronze	Bucky Lasek	

=== Men's Skateboard Vert Best Trick ===
Place	Athlete	Trick
Gold	Bucky Lasek	Frontside cab varial heel flip
Silver	Max Dufour	Backside kickflip 360 tail grind
Bronze	Bob Burnquist	Fronside tail slide 360 out

=== Men's Skateboard Big Air ===
Place	Athlete	Score
Gold	Danny Way	95.00
Silver	Jake Brown	93.00
Bronze	Bob Burnquist	91.25

=== Men's Skateboard Street ===
Place	Athlete	Score
Gold	Chris Cole	90.68
Silver	Ryan Sheckler	85.31
Bronze	Andrew Reynolds	85.06

=== Women's Skateboard Street ===
Place	Athlete	Score
Gold	Elissa Steamer	
Silver	Lauren Perkins	
Bronze	Lacey Baker	

=== Women's Skateboarding Vert ===
Place	Athlete	Score
Gold	Cara-Beth Burnside	
Silver	Mimi Knoop	
Bronze	Karen Jones	

== Other highlights ==
- Shaun White failed to land the 1080 in skate best trick after 17 contest attempts, and 2 past event, injuring his hand on the second post-contest attempt.
- Colin McRae was leading at the 4th split when at the jump he flipped the car after landing. McRae still managed to finish 2nd in the Rally event.
