= X Games XIII =

2007 multi-sport event in Los Angeles

X Games Los Angeles 2007
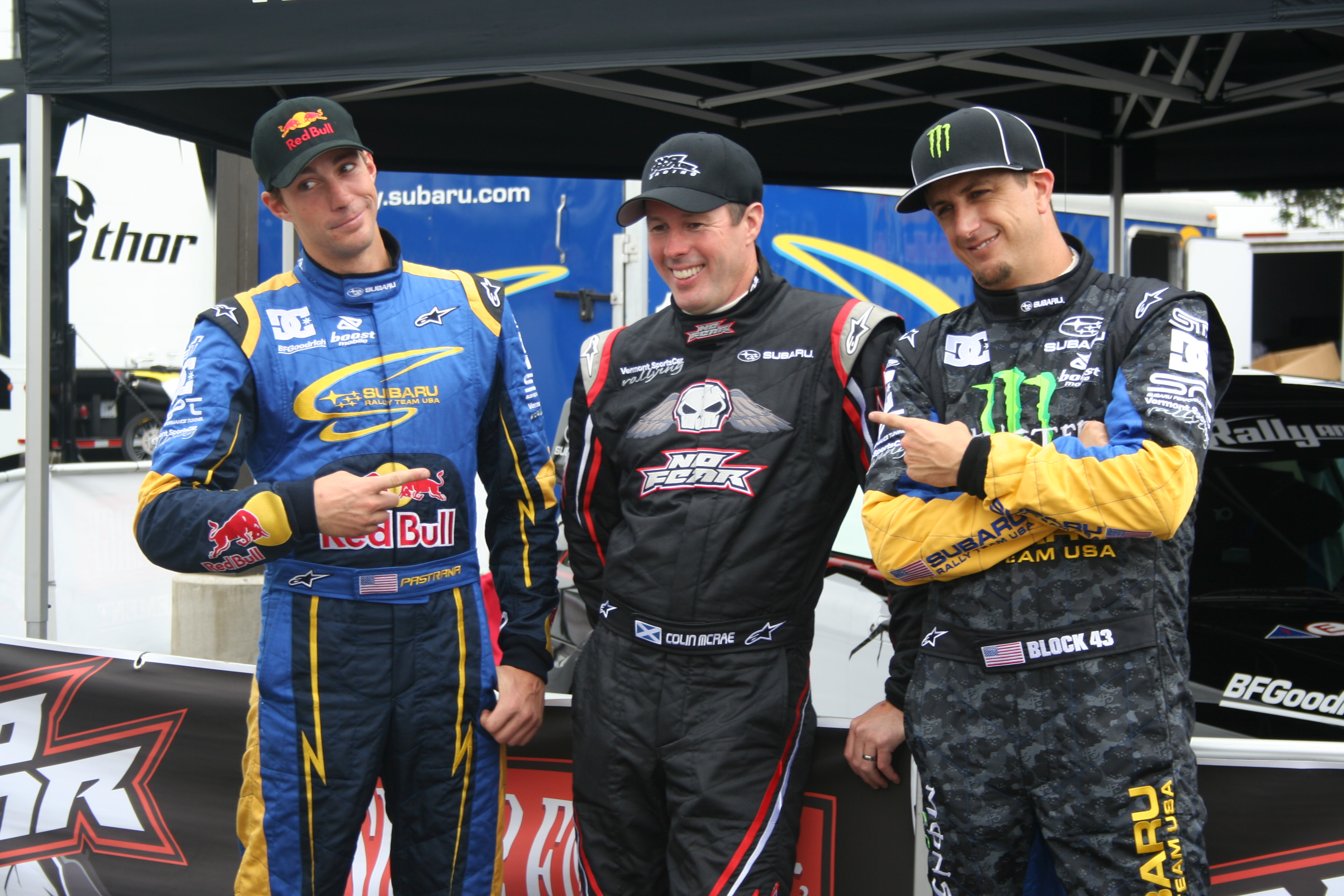
- Travis Pastrana, Colin McRae and Ken Block at the X Games XIII.
- Venue: Staples Center; Home Depot Center
- Location: Los Angeles, California
- Date: August 2-5

X Games XIII (13) took place from August 2–5, 2007 in Los Angeles, California at the Staples Center and the Home Depot Center. It was broadcast on the ESPN networks, EXPN.com and ABC.

Events included:

- Motocross (Racing, Step Up, Supermoto, Freestyle and Best Trick)
- Skateboarding (Big Air, Vert, Street and Street Best Trick)
- BMX (Big Air, Park, Vert)
- Surfing (Men and Women)
- Rallying

== Highlights and results ==
=== Day 1 – Thursday, August 2 ===
- Jake Brown lost his board on his way up the quarterpipe during a skateboard run in the Big Air contest, falling over 40 feet to the floor. Incredibly, he managed to walk away from the fall, but suffered a bruised liver, fractured wrist and bruised lung. In replays, it was shown that he changed direction at the last second which forced his back foot to push the board away from him. This allowed him and his board to follow in different directions. Jake Brown would be released from the hospital on August 4 and was at the Moto X Freestyle preliminaries though he was walking with a cane.

==== Men's Skateboard Big Air ====
Place	Athlete	Score
Gold	Bob Burnquist	95.66
Silver	Jake Brown	95.33
Bronze	Pierre-Luc Gagnon	93.00

==== Moto X Best Trick ====
Place	Athlete	Score
Gold	Kyle Loza	94.20
Silver	Adam Jones	91.00
Bronze	Todd Potter	91.00

- In the Moto X Best Trick competition, Scott Murray attempted the double backflip on his motorcycle, but came up short. The bike was damaged beyond repair for a second run.
- Kyle Loza wins the Best Trick competition with a body varial trick he calls "The Volt".

=== Day 2 – Friday, August 3 ===
==== Men's Skateboard Street ====
Place	Athlete	Score
Gold	Chris Cole	94.33
Silver	Greg Lutzka	93.41
Bronze	Jereme Rogers	87.41

==== Women's Skateboard Vert ====
Place	Athlete
Gold	Lyn-Z Adams Hawkins
Silver	Mimi Knoop
Bronze	Cara-Beth Burnside

==== Women's Skateboard Street ====
Place	Athlete	Score
Gold	Marisa Dal Santa	86.08
Silver	Elissa Steamer	80.33
Bronze	Amy Caron	80.16

- Kevin Robinson wins Gold in the BMX Big Air competition, reaching a height above the vert ramp of at least 20 feet. Mat Hoffman returned to compete in Big Air after a 5-year hiatus.

==== BMX Big Air ====
Place	Athlete	Score
Gold	Kevin Robinson	95.33
Silver	Steve McCann	93.00
Bronze	Anthony Napolitan	92.66

==== Moto X Step Up ====
Place	Athlete	Elimination Height
Gold	Ronnie Renner	
Silver	Brian Deegan	33'0"
Silver	Matt Buyten	33'0"
Silver	Tommy Clowers	33'0"
5th	Jeremy McGrath	32'0"

Note: This was the first year that competitors had to win to get a medal.

=== Day 3 – Saturday, August 4 ===
==== BMX Park ====
Place	Athlete	Score
Gold	Daniel Dhers	91.66
Silver	Scotty Cranmer	90.33
Bronze	Dave Mirra	88.00

==== BMX Vert ====
Place	Athlete	Score
Gold	Jamie Bestwick	93.66
Silver	Simon Tabron	92.66
Bronze	Kevin Robinson	88.33

==== Moto X Racing ====
Place	Athlete
Gold	Ricky Carmichael
Silver	Grant Langston
Bronze	Kevin Windham

==== Moto X Freestyle ====
Place	Athlete	Score
Gold	Adam Jones	94.40
Silver	Nate Adams	93.60
Bronze	Jeremy Stenberg	91.60

==== Moto X Super Moto ====
Place	Athlete
Gold	Mark Burkhart
Silver	Jeff Ward
Bronze	David Pingree

=== Day 4 – Sunday, August 5 ===
==== Men's Skateboard Vert ====
Place	Athlete	Run 1	Run 2	Run 3	Results
Gold	Shaun White	85.00	59.75	95.75	95.75
Silver	Pierre-Luc Gagnon	00.00	91.25	00.00	91.25
Bronze	Mathias Ringstrom	00.00	88.25	00.00	88.25

This year introduced a new rule that stated that once a rider "bailed" or had fallen, their run was over, reinforcing the medal contention.

==== Rallying ====
Place	Driver/Co-Driver
Gold	Tanner Foust/Chrissie Beavis
Silver	Ken Block/Alex Gelsomino
Bronze	Travis Pastrana/Christian Edström

Pastrana/Edström were disqualified in the semifinals after crossing into their competitors' lane just before the finish against Foust/Beavis. Pastrana defeated Ramana Lagemann for the bronze medal. Lagemann replaced Colin McRae in the bronze race because McRae's car was too heavily damaged.
