= Point X =

Skateboarding camp

Point X was a skateboarding camp near Aguanga, California. It housed the first example of the modern "MegaRamp" style mega ramp, used to set height and distance records by Danny Way. The camp primarily featured a skate park and terrain but also included other outdoor activities. Skaters known to have skated at Point X include Way, Bob Burnquist, Lyn-Z Adams Hawkins, Tony Magnusson, Buster Halterman, and Owen Nieder.

The camp was used as a filming location for the film Dishdogz.
