= X Games XIV =

X Games Los Angeles 2008
- Venue: Staples Center; Home Depot Center
- Location: Los Angeles, California
- Date: July 31-August 3

X Games XIV was a professional extreme sports event that took place in Los Angeles, California, United States from July 31, to August 3, 2008. Events were held at the Staples Center and the Home Depot Center as well as surrounding venues.

== Events ==
=== Skateboarding ===
Event	Gold	Silver	Bronze
Women's Skateboard Vert	Karen Jonz (Brazil)	Lyn-z Adams Hawkins (United States) (USA)	Mimi Knoop (United States) (USA)
Women's Skateboard Street	Elissa Steamer (United States) (USA)	Marisa Dal Santo (United States) (USA)	Amy Caron (United States) (USA)
Skateboard Big Air	Bob Burnquist (Brazil) 96.00	Danny Way (United States) (USA) 94.00	Jake Brown (Australia) 91.33
Skateboard Vert Am	Pedro Barros (Brazil)	Sam Beckett (United Kingdom)	Ben Hatchell (United States) (USA)
Skateboard Street	Ryan Sheckler (United States) (USA)	Paul Rodriguez (United States) (USA)	Greg Lutzka (United States) (USA)
Skateboard Vert	Pierre-Luc Gagnon (Canada)	Bucky Lasek (United States) (USA)	Shaun White (United States) (USA)
Skateboard SuperPark	Rune Glifberg (Denmark)	Andy Macdonald (United States) (USA)	Tony Trujillo (United States) (USA)

=== BMX ===
Event	Gold	Silver	Bronze
BMX Freestyle Street	Garrett Reynolds (United States) (USA) 91.33	Van Homan (United States) (USA) 90.44	Sean Sexton (United States) (USA) 88.88
BMX Freestyle Big Air	Chad Kagy (United States) (USA) 96.00	Dave Mirra (United States) (USA) 94.66	Kevin Robinson (United States) (USA) 91.00
BMX SuperPark	Daniel Dhers (Venezuela) 101	Diogo Canina (Brazil) 90	Rob Darden (United States) (USA) 85
BMX Freestyle Vert	Jamie Bestwick (United Kingdom) 111.00	Chad Kagy (United States) (USA) 105.00	Steve McCann (Australia) 103.00

=== Moto X ===
Event	Gold	Silver	Bronze
Moto X Step Up	Ricky Carmichael (United States) (USA) 33'0"	Ronnie Renner (United States) (USA) 32'0"	Tommy Clowers (United States) (USA); Brian Deegan (United States) (USA); Mike Mason (United States) (USA) 30'0"
Moto X Best Trick	Kyle Loza (United States) (USA) 94.40	Jeremy Lusk (United States) (USA) 92.80	Todd Potter (United States) (USA) 90.00
Moto X SuperMoto	Jeff Ward (United States) (USA)	Robbie Horton (United States) (USA)	Brandon Currie (United States) (USA)
Moto X Speed and Style	Kevin Johnson (United States) (USA)	Ronnie Renner (United States) (USA)	Jeremy Stenberg (United States) (USA)
Moto X Racing	Josh Hansen (United States) (USA)	Jeremy McGrath (United States) (USA)	Josh Grant (United States) (USA)
Women's Moto X Racing	Tarah Geiger (Puerto Rico)	Sherri Cruse (United States) (USA)	Tatum Sik (United States) (USA)
Moto X Freestyle	Jeremy Lusk (United States) (USA) 92.40	Mat Rebeaud (Switzerland) (SUI) 89.00	Mike Mason (United States) (USA) 86.20

=== Rallying ===
Event	Gold	Silver	Bronze
Rally Car Racing	Travis Pastrana (United States) (USA)	Tanner Foust (United States) (USA)	Dave Mirra (United States) (USA)
