= X Games XV =

2009 sporting event in Los Angeles

X Games Los Angeles 2009
- Venue: Staples Center; Home Depot Center
- Location: Los Angeles, California
- Date: July 30-August 2

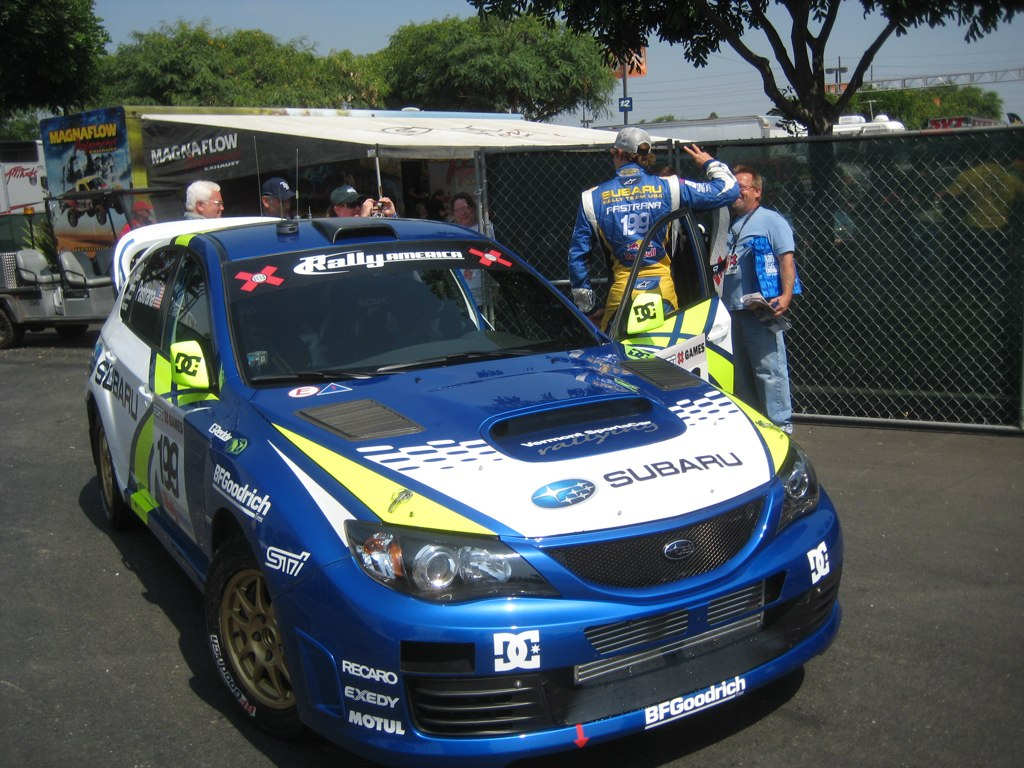
Travis Pastrana's Subaru Impreza WRX STI Rally car at X Games XV

X Games XV was the fifteenth annual X Games extreme sports event. It took place from July 30 – August 2, 2009, in Los Angeles, California, at the Staples Center and the Home Depot Center. It was broadcast on ESPN networks, ABC, and EXPN.com.

The game featured the sports of motocross, skateboarding, BMX, surfing, and rallying.

== Results ==
=== Moto X ===
| Event | Gold | | Silver | | Bronze | |
|---|---|---|---|---|---|---|
| Moto X Best Whip | Todd Potter | 42.00 | James Stewart | 21.00 | Ricky Carmichael | 17.00 |
| Moto X Step Up | Ricky Carmichael; Ronnie Renner | 34'0" | | | Matt Buyten | 33'0" |
| Moto X Super X Adaptive | Chris Ridgway | 5:14.691 | Mike Schultz | 5:24.884 | Jason Woods | 5:31.501 |
| Moto X Best Trick | Kyle Loza | 89.20 | Blake Williams | 88.00 | Todd Potter | 83.40 |
| Moto X SuperMoto | Ivan Lazzarini | 1772.71 | Mark Burkhart | 1774.38 | Adrien Chareyre | 1785.00 |
| Moto X Super X | Josh Hansen | 16:49.871 | Justin Brayton | 16:58.138 | Kevin Windham | 17:05.804 |
| Women's Moto X Super X | Ashley Fiolek | 6:12.472 | Jessica Patterson | 6:15.818 | Elizabeth Bash | 6:37.318 |
| Moto X Freestyle | Blake Williams | 87 | Jeremy Stenberg | 86 | Nate Adams | 82 |

=== Skateboarding ===
| Event | Gold | | Silver | | Bronze | |
|---|---|---|---|---|---|---|
| Women's Skateboard Vert | Lyn-Z Adams Hawkins | | Karen Jonz | | Gaby Ponce | 17.00 |
| Women's Skateboard Street | Marisa Dal Santo | 374 | Alexis Sablone | 353 | Elissa Steamer | 350 |
| Skateboard Big Air | Jake Brown | 94.00 | Bob Burnquist | 94.00 | Rob Lorifice | 92.33 |
| Skateboard Vert Am | Sam Bosworth | 85 | Sam Beckett | 76 | Pedro Barros | 73 |
| Skateboard Big Air Rail Jam | Danny Way | 92.00 | Bob Burnquist | 89.00 | Rob Lorifice | 88.33 |
| Skateboard Street | Paul Rodriguez | 390 | Nyjah Huston | 364 | Adam Dyet | 349 |
| Skateboard Vert | Pierre-Luc Gagnon | 93 | Bucky Lasek | 91 | Andy Macdonald | 84 |
| Skateboard Park | Rune Glifberg | 125 | Andy Macdonald | 118 | Chad Bartie | 115 |
| Skateboard Park Legends | Christian Hosoi | 126 | Chris Miller | 124 | Lance Mountain | 112 |

=== BMX ===
| Event | Gold | | Silver | | Bronze | |
|---|---|---|---|---|---|---|
| BMX Freestyle Street | Garrett Reynolds | 410 | Nathan Williams | 394 | Van Homan | 391 |
| BMX Freestyle Big Air | Kevin Robinson | 91.00 | Chad Kagy | 90.33 | Dave Mirra | 89.66 |
| BMX Freestyle Park | Scotty Cranmer | 133 | Diogo Canina | 130 | Gary Young | 128 |
| BMX Freestyle Vert | Jamie Bestwick | 98 | Simon Tabron | 87 | Chad Kagy | |

=== Rallying ===
| Event | Gold | Silver | Bronze |
|---|---|---|---|
| Rally Car Racing | Kenny Bräck | Travis Pastrana | Tanner Foust / Brian Deegan |

== Highlights ==
Highlights from the competition include:

- Jake Brown wins gold in Skateboard Big Air, two years after he suffered a horrific crash in the same event.
- Danny Way wins the inaugural Big Air Rail Jam, a contest which he created.
- Josh Hansen, son of champion Moto X rider Donnie Hansen, wins his second consecutive gold in Moto X Super X.
- Kyle Loza becomes the first person to win three consecutive gold medals in Moto X Best Trick in controversial fashion by using the same trick he used to win in 2008, The Electric Doom.
- Ricky Carmichael suffers an injury during Moto X Step Up. Due to the circumstances, dual gold medals were awarded to Carmichael and to Ronnie Renner.
- Anthony Napolitan lands the first ever double front flip on a bicycle.
- Blake Williams becomes the first non-American rider to win Moto X Freestyle gold.
- Jamie Bestwick wins his third consecutive gold in BMX Vert.
- Pierre-Luc Gagnon wins his second consecutive gold in Skateboard Vert.
- Travis Pastrana crashes in the final round of Rally Car Racing, while neck-and-neck with Kenny Bräck who then could go on to win the gold.
