= Tailwhip =

Bike trick

Tailwhip with BMX

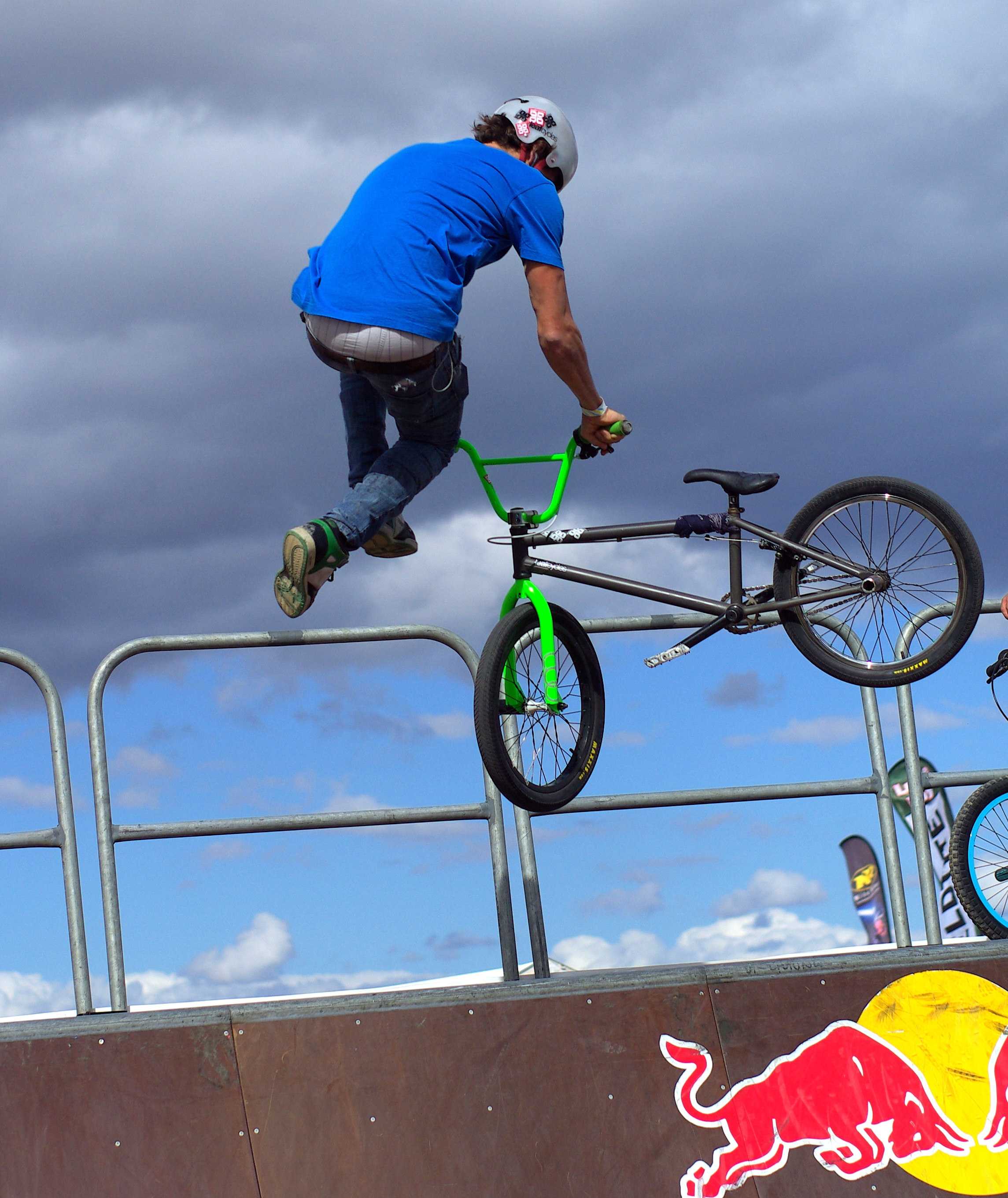
A tailwhip performed in a half-pipe.

The tailwhip is a bike trick typically performed on a BMX, in which the frame of the bike performs a complete rotation around the front end (bars and forks), which remains stationary throughout the move. The same trick may also be performed on a kick scooter.

To do the trick there are a few main methods: these both include whipping the bike around using your arms in a gyrating motion whilst holding the bars, but some riders also kick the bike with their back foot to give it extra momentum. It also helps if you approach a jump crooked, which will throw the bike from under, allowing you to start a tailwhip.

== Variations ==
Footplant tailwhip
Combination of footplant and tailwhip on any obstacle. The rider rides up to any obstacle that is capable of having a footplant done on it. The rider then whips the frame as he would normally with a tailwhip, but instead of keeping his legs sucked into his body, he puts one foot down in a footplant. The rider then waits for the frame to come a little past 180 degrees before he hops out of a footplant and prepares for the frame to complete its rotation before putting his feet on the pedals and riding away slowly.
Footjam tailwhip
The rider puts their foot on the front tire and pedal, while leaning forward, enabling the frame to spin around. This is the original tailwhip variation as invented by Brian Blyther in the early 1980s.
Tailwhip air
The rider performs a tailwhip while 'airing'. The trick is usually done on a quarter pipe, over a box jump, and over dirt jumps. The trick was invented in the 1980s.
Heelwhip
The rider performs the tailwhip his unnatural direction. Pulling tricks your unnatural direction is as hard as throwing a baseball with your opposite hand. Allan Cooke was the first known rider to pull the trick in 2001. Josh Hult and Brandon Dosch are both known to have pulled opposite double-whips.
Superman tailwhip
The rider does a tailwhip as he normally would, but the rider then extends his legs straight out (like he would do when doing a superman) when the frame is about 180 degrees around the rotation. The rider then sucks his legs back in and waits for the frame to come back around, then finds his/her pedals and lands. This is an advanced variation, only to be attempted when the basic form of a tailwhip is thoroughly mastered.
Double/Triple/Quadruple Tailwhip
The rider instead of only allowing the tail of the bike to rotate around once they use more force to spin it twice/three/four times. The triple tailwhip was first landed by Joe Johnson. Others who have landed it are James Foster, Dave Mirra, Cameron White, Dennis Enarson, Nicholi Rogatkin, Mike Spinner, Daniel Dhers, Scotty Cranmer, Brandon Dosch, Brett Banasiewicz, and many more. Francisco Zurita was the first to pull a triple whip on the Vert ramp. And the quadruple is incredibly rare. First landed by Mike Spinner at the Dew Tour in Cleveland in 2008. Andy Buckworth, Nicholi Rogatkin, and Logan Martin have also pulled the trick.
360 Tailwhip
The rider spins in a 360 degree circle while the tail of the bike rotates in a tailwhip. The origination of this maneuver is widely disputed (bmx plus ran photos of the trick being pulled in 1992. Americans recognize Brian Vowell as the first to pull the trick to the pedals over a set of doubles. Dave Osato was the first one ever to pull 360 Tailwhips in both directions. Mike Laird pulled the 360 double tailwhip at the 2005 Dew Tour in Denver. Mike Spinner was the first to pull the 360 Triple Tailwhip at Dave Mirra's personal warehouse ramps in 2006, and the first with a quad in competition in Cleveland in 2008.
540 Tailwhip
The rider spins a 540 degree rotation while doing a tailwhip in the middle of the trick. It has been pulled by Chad Kagy, Kevin Robinson, Jamie Bestwick, Mike Spinner, and many others. Vince Byron was the first one to pull a double tailwhip 540.
720 Tailwhip
The 720-whip is a rare feat. The rider does a 180, then does the tailwhip, before catching it and rotating the extra 540 degrees. The first one to have pulled it was Mike Spinner in 2006. Spinner has also pulled 720 Double tailwhips before. Kyle Baldock also landed a 720 double-whip at the 2016 X Games.
Backflip tailwhip
The rider first performs a back flip and in the middle of it throws a tailwhip (still upside down) and catches the tailwhip while pulling out of the back flip. First attempted by Mat Hoffman in 1993 and landed in 2001 by Adam Strieby, this maneuver is common among today's pro class. There are also Backflip double tailwhips done by many riders. The first one who pulled this was Scotty Cranmer in 2004. Joey Marks pulled the world's first double-whip backflip in competition at the Gravity Games in 2005. The backflip double-whip is called a “Helicopter” The world's first backflip triple whip was landed by Jaie Toohey at the Nitro Circus in 2011, and Kurtis Downs nailed the first ever quadruple tailwhip backflip at the Nitro World Games in 2016. In 2013, Jed Mildon pulled a double backflip tailwhip at Nitro Circus in Wellington, New Zealand. The double backflip tailwhip was also landed a few times at the Nitro World Games.
Front Flip tailwhip
The rider first performs a front flip and in the middle of it throws a tailwhip (still upside down) and catches the tailwhip while pulling out of the front flip. Ryan Guettler tried the trick one time in 2005 and failed. The trick was landed by Scotty Cranmer at the Salt Lake City Dew Tour in 2007. The trick has also been done by riders like T.J. Ellis and Logan Martin.
Flair tailwhip
The rider does a tailwhip while performing a Flair (backflip with a 180 twist at the end). The trick is usually seen on the Vert ramp, but also has been landed in numerous park competitions. Jamie Bestwick was the first one to pull a downside tailwhip flair at the 2003 X Games. 2 years later, he performed a double downside-whip flair. Dave Mirra has pulled the regular tailwhip flair on Vert, along with Vince Byron, and many others. The flair whip has been done in Park by many people. The double tailwhip flair has also been pulled before.
Downside Tailwhip
The rider basically spins one direction while doing a tailwhip in the opposite direction of the spin. The rider can either do a regular spin with a switch/opposite tailwhip, or a switch/opposite spin with a regular tailwhip. This trick is commonly done on hips as it is easy for the transition into the position. The trick was originally called a "Boomerang air".
Whiplash
This is similar to a footjam tailwhip. However, the rider goes into a hang five position and gradually pulls his non-dominant leg up and over the frame, allowing the bike to rotate all around in the opposite spinning direction.
Flat tailwhip
A bunnyhop tailwhip performed on flat land, without the aid of a ramp. Invented by Bill Nitchske - The name derives from the Burger King Hamburger of the same name. The trick was first pulled on the parking lot of Nitchske's local Burger King joint.
Flatspin tailwhip
The flat-whip is a trick that is very rarely seen. The rider does a flatspin 540 degree rotation while he does the tailwhip in the middle of the flatspin. The trick is regularly done by Chad Kagy, who debuted the trick at the X Games in 2005. The next year, Kagy pulled a double tailwhip flatspin 540 during the Best Trick event. Kagy finished second, behind Kevin Robinson, who pulled one of the most dangerous tricks in the BMX world, a Double Flair.
Windshield Wiper/360 Windshield Wiper
The rider spins a tailwhip and, while still in the air, spins another tailwhip back the other way. Matt Sparks was the first rider to do it on a BMX bike in 2006, calling it a Windshield Wiper. A 360 windshield wiper is when the rider spins a 360 degree rotation while doing a windshield wiper at the same time. James foster did it in 2008 at the Jomopro contest in Joplin, MO. Foster also landed it in the fifth Cameron White Annual Dirt Jam. The trick has also been pulled by Kyle Baldock, Alessandro Barbero, among others. Baldock landed a 360 windshield wiper to late tailwhip at the 2011 Salt Lake City Dew Tour. At the Dew Tour in Orlando, FL in 2009, T.J. Ellis pulled the world's first Windshield Wiper Backflip.
Fingerwhip
The rider spins the frame with one hand while holding the handlebar with the other, instead of whipping the frame around with both hands on the bar.
One-Handed Tailwhip
The rider does a normal tailwhip in the air, and, as the frame is 1/2 way through the rotation, the rider lets go one of his hands and catches the bar while hopping back on the pedals before he lands.
