= MTV Sports: Skateboarding Featuring Andy Macdonald =

2000 video game

- Developers: Darkblack; Yellowbelly Corporation (GBC)
- Publisher: THQ
- Platforms: Microsoft Windows, PlayStation, Game Boy Color, Dreamcast
- Release: Microsoft Windows, PlayStation: NA: September 13, 2000; EU: November 3, 2000; Game Boy Color: NA: September 13, 2000; EU: November 17, 2000; Dreamcast: NA: October 20, 2000; EU: November 17, 2000
- Genre: Sports
- Modes: Single-player, multiplayer

MTV Sports: Skateboarding Featuring Andy Macdonald is a sports video game developed by Darkblack and published by THQ for Game Boy Color, Microsoft Windows, PlayStation and Dreamcast. It features skateboarder Andy Macdonald on the cover.

== Reception ==
Reception

Aggregate scores
Aggregator	Score			
Aggregator	Dreamcast	GBC	PC	PS
GameRankings	39%	61%	62%	48%
Metacritic	40/100	N/A	N/A	40/100

Review scores
Publication	Score			
Publication	Dreamcast	GBC	PC	PS
AllGame	N/A	N/A	N/A	1.5/5
CNET Gamecenter	N/A	N/A	7/10	3/10
Computer Games Strategy Plus	N/A	N/A	2/5	N/A
Consoles +	N/A	N/A	N/A	-10%
Electronic Gaming Monthly	N/A	N/A	N/A	1.5/10 2/10 3.5/10
EP Daily	N/A	N/A	N/A	2/10
Game Informer	N/A	6.75/10	N/A	3/10
GameSpot	2.9/10	N/A	5.1/10	2.3/10
GameZone	N/A	N/A	8.4/10	7/10
IGN	2/10	7/10	5/10	4/10
Next Generation	N/A	N/A	N/A	2/5
Nintendo Power	N/A	5.9/10	N/A	N/A
Official U.S. PlayStation Magazine	N/A	N/A	N/A	1/5
Official Dreamcast Magazine (US)	2/10	N/A	N/A	N/A

The Dreamcast and PlayStation versions received "unfavorable" reviews according to the review aggregation website Metacritic. Jim Preston of NextGen said of the latter console version: "No matter what all the marketing tells you, this has all the grit and soul of an Egg McMuffin," calling it a "LAM3 SK8R".

The game was a runner-up for the "Worst Game" award at GameSpot's Best and Worst of 2000 Awards, which went to Spirit of Speed 1937. The staff dubbed it as "unplayable and ugly".

== Featured skaters ==
- Andy Macdonald (skateboarder)
- Danny Way
- Sal Barbier
- Rob Dyrdek
- Stevie Williams
- Colin McKay
- Josh Kalis

== Soundtrack ==
- OPM - "Heaven Is a Halfpipe"
- Pilfers - "Climbing"
- Goldfinger - "I'm Down"
- Deftones - "Street Carp"
- Cypress Hill - "(Rock) Superstar"
- System of a Down - "Sugar"
- Snapcase - "Twentieth Nervous Breakdown"
- Pennywise - "Might Be a Dream"
- No Use for a Name - "Life Size Mirror"
- Flashpoint - "Militant"
