= Andy Macdonald (skateboarder) =

American skateboarder (born 1973)

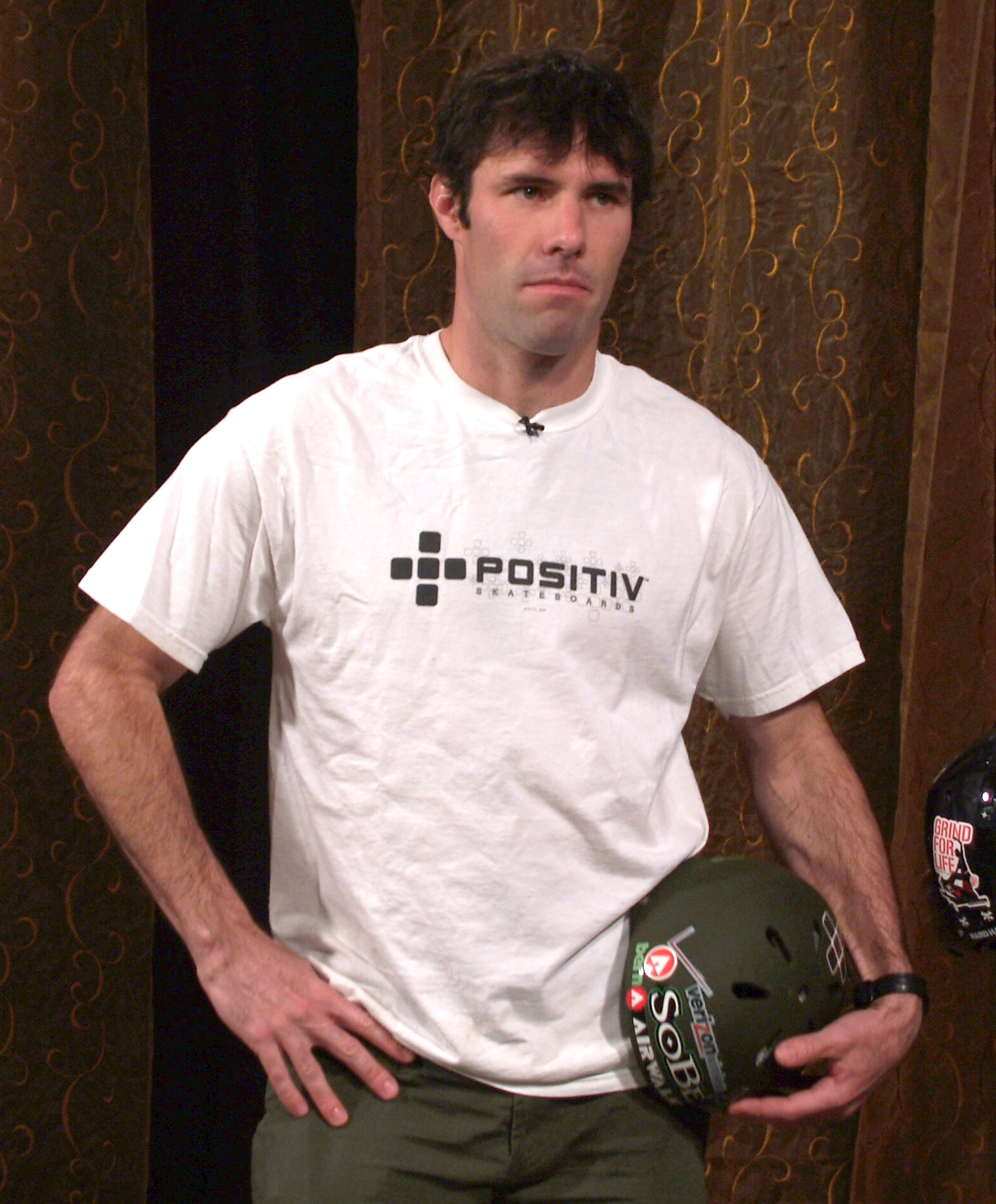
- Macdonald in 2008

Personal information
- Full name: Andrew Macdonald
- Born: July 31, 1973 (age 53) Melrose, Massachusetts, U.S.
- Height: 5 ft 8 in (173 cm)
- Weight: 165 lb (75 kg)

Sport
- Country: United States (1994–2024); United Kingdom (2024–)
- Sport: Skateboarding
Medal record
Summer X Games
Representing United States
Gold medal – first place	1996 Newport	Vert
Gold medal – first place	1997 San Diego	Vert Doubles
Gold medal – first place	1998 San Diego	Vert
Gold medal – first place	1998 San Diego	Vert Doubles
Gold medal – first place	1999 San Francisco	Vert Doubles
Gold medal – first place	2000 San Francisco	Vert Doubles
Gold medal – first place	2001 Philadelphia	Vert Doubles
Gold medal – first place	2002 Philadelphia	Vert Doubles
Silver medal – second place	1997 San Diego	Park
Silver medal – second place	1998 San Diego	Park
Silver medal – second place	1999 San Francisco	Vert
Silver medal – second place	2003 Los Angeles	Vert
Silver medal – second place	2008 Los Angeles	Park
Silver medal – second place	2009 Los Angeles	Park
Silver medal – second place	2010 Los Angeles	Park
Bronze medal – third place	2000 San Francisco	Vert Best Trick
Bronze medal – third place	2003 Los Angeles	Vert Best Trick
Bronze medal – third place	2004 Los Angeles	Big Air
Bronze medal – third place	2005 Los Angeles	Big Air
Bronze medal – third place	2009 Los Angeles	Vert
Bronze medal – third place	2010 Los Angeles	Vert
Bronze medal – third place	2012 Los Angeles	Vert
Nitro World Games
Representing United States
Bronze medal – third place	2017 Salt Lake City	Best Trick

Andrew Macdonald (born July 31, 1973) is an American professional skateboarder. As of September 2013, he holds the record for the most X Games medals in vert skateboarding and won the World Cup Skateboarding competition eight times.

He represented Great Britain at the 2024 Olympic Games.

== Early life ==
Macdonald is originally from Melrose, Massachusetts, and started skateboarding in 1986 when he was 12 years old. He graduated from Newton North High School in 1992. His father, Rodrick Macdonald, was born in Luton, England.

== Professional skateboarding ==
Macdonald became a professional skateboarder in 1994. In 1998 he was selected the "Best Overall Skater" in the "Readers Poll" of Transworld Skateboarding magazine, and was also chosen to host Transworld's skateboarding "Trick Tip" video, Starting Point 2: Transitions. He has received praise for his perennial consistency as he medals in most of the competitions he enters, even beating out a lot of younger skateboarders.

In 1999 Macdonald delivered an anti-drug speech at the White House that was preceded by Macdonald skateboarding down the marble floor of the hallway.

With SBI Enterprises and Bruce Middleton, Macdonald designed the "Flybar 1200", a type of extreme pogo-stick.

In 2022 he announced his intention to try to qualify for the 2024 Summer Olympics representing his father's homeland of Great Britain, despite the fact that he would be 51 years old at the start of the park skateboard event at the Games. He secured qualification in June 2024 making him the oldest Olympic skateboarder in history. His fellow British skateboarding team members are Sky Brown and Lola Tambling who are both sixteen years old.

=== Sponsors ===
As of September 2013, Macdonald is sponsored by Positiv Skateboards, Airwalk, Amazon.com, MovieTickets.com, Clif Bar, GoPro, Bern Unlimited, Killer Pads, PushWood skatepark locator app, and Theeve Titanium Truck Co.

== Video game appearances ==
In 1999, he was featured in the video game MTV Sports: Skateboarding featuring Andy MacDonald for the Dreamcast, PlayStation, and PC. He was also featured in the PC game Backyard Skateboarding.

== Contest history ==
- 1st in 1996–2000, 2002, 2012 World Cup
- 1st in 1997–2002 X Games: vert doubles (with Tony Hawk)

3rd in 2009 X Games 15 Vert Competition 2nd in 2009 X Games 15 Park Andy has been involved in promoting skateboarding and its growth, progression and exposure since as far back as his days as an instructor at the YMCA in Peabody MA (1989) right near his hometown of North Andover.
