= Josh Hansen (motorcyclist) =

American motorcycle racer

Medal record

Representing the United States

Summer X Games
Gold medal – first place	2008 Los Angeles	Moto X Supercross
Gold medal – first place	2009 Los Angeles	Moto X Supercross
Bronze medal – third place	2013 Foz do Iguaçu	Moto X Best Whip
Bronze medal – third place	2014 Austin	Moto X Best Whip

Josh Hansen (born February 16, 1984) is an American professional motocross racer, currently riding the no. 100. The son of retired motocross champion Donnie Hansen, he is best known for winning the GOLD medal for Best Whip in Moto X at the Summer X Games for three consecutive years. Hansen also won back to back gold medals at X Games 14 and X Games 15 in Los Angeles, California in the Supercross event. Hansen currently serves as a brand ambassador for Husqvarna Rockstar Energy and is sponsored by Fox Racing and Shift.

== Career ==
Hansen was born and raised in Elbert, Colorado. He currently resides in California. His father, Donnie Hansen, is a former Factory Honda rider with national titles in motocross and Supercross.

Hansen received his first motocross bike at five, and began racing competitively at eight. He spent his early years touring the country with his family, winning numerous amateur titles in national competitions as his father conducted a motocross academy. At the age of 17, he went professional.

The Hansens are the first father-son duo in the AMA Supercross record book.

=== Career highlights ===
- 2010 Won Super X, The Australian Supercross Championship.
- 2009 Gold medal for Supercross at X Games 15
- 2008 Gold medal for Supercross at X Games 14
- 2005 Tied for East Coast Lites Championship
- 2005 Won AMA 125cc East Region Supercross races at Daytona Beach, Fla., and Pontiac, Mich., and earned three additional season podium finishes
- 2004 Won Indianapolis Supercross
