= Scotty Cranmer =

American BMX rider

Personal information
- Nickname: "The Bulldozer"
- Born: January 11, 1987 (age 39) Jackson Township, New Jersey, U.S.
- Height: 5 ft 9 in (175 cm)
- Weight: 170 lb (77 kg)
- Spouse: Lisa Cranmer (m. 2014)

Sport
- Events: X Games, Dew Tour
Medal record
Summer X Games
Representing United States
Gold medal – first place	2006 Los Angeles	BMX Park
Gold medal – first place	2009 Los Angeles	BMX Park
Gold medal – first place	2012 Los Angeles	BMX Park
Silver medal – second place	2005 Los Angeles	BMX Park
Silver medal – second place	2007 Los Angeles	BMX Park
Silver medal – second place	2013 Munich	BMX Park
Bronze medal – third place	2011 Los Angeles	BMX Park
Bronze medal – third place	2013 Barcelona	BMX Park
Bronze medal – third place	2015 Austin	BMX Park
- Updated on September 9, 2016

Scotty Cranmer (born January 11, 1987) is an American BMX rider. He is tied with Dave Mirra for the most X Games BMX Park medals with nine, three each in gold, silver and bronze over fourteen appearances. He attended Jackson Memorial High School. Nicknamed "the Bulldozer", he is sponsored by Vans Shoes, Hyper Bike Co., Fox Clothing, Pro-tec Helmets, Monster Energy and Snafu. He owns a bike shop in Howell, NJ called SC Action Sports Bicycle Shop. He is also widely known for having a YouTube channel under the name Scotty Cranmer in which he makes videos with his friends riding skateparks, driving cars, and playing games while riding their bikes. His younger brother Matty is a regular guest on the channel. As of June 2021, the channel has accumulated over 1.71 million subscribers and 500 million total views since releasing his first video in September 2015.

== Injury ==
On October 12, 2016, during a session, Cranmer suffered a spinal cord injury. He rolled into a hole in the ground after landing a trick on his bike, flipping over and landing on his head. Even though he was wearing a helmet, he still injured his head and some of his vertebrae.

He made a partial recovery and has been largely able-bodied since, but as of 2023 he is still partially paralyzed. While he can do some rudimentary tricks on a BMX bike and regularly rides a bike for leisure and exercise, he no longer rides BMX competitively.

However, Cranmer has kept his career in BMX going through other means. He still runs SC Action Sports, releases videos regularly on his YouTube channel, mentors younger riders, and has been a commentator in numerous large-scale BMX events, including the X Games.

== Career highlights ==
- X Games XVIII Gold Medal in Park
- X Games XV Gold Medal in Park
- X Games XII Gold Medal in Park
- X Games Munich 2013 Silver Medal in Park
- X Games 2007 Silver Medal in Park
- X Games 2005 Silver Medal in Park
- Landed the first ever frontflip-tailwhip in competition (2007 AST Dew Tour – Toyota Challenge, Salt Lake City)
- Landed the first ever seat stand front flip on his YouTube channel
- AST Dew Tour – Toyota Challenge – 1st
- BMX Masters
- AST Dew Tour – Panasonic Open – 3rd
- AST Dew Tour – Right Guard Open – 8th
- AST Dew Tour – Vans Invitational – 2nd
- AST Dew Tour – Toyota Challenge – 2nd
- AST Dew Tour – PlayStation Pro – 1st
- AST Dew Tour – Yearend Overall – 2nd
- Bike 2005 Birmingham, England – 2nd
- Vans "Let it Ride" Las Vegas – 1st
- AST Dew Tour – Panasonic Open – 1st
- AST Dew Tour – Right Guard Open – 15th
- AST Dew Tour – Vans Invitational – 2nd
- AST Dew Tour – Toyota Challenge – 1st
- The Cool Challenge – Espens Challenge – 1st
