= Bob Burnquist =

Brazilian-American professional skateboarder

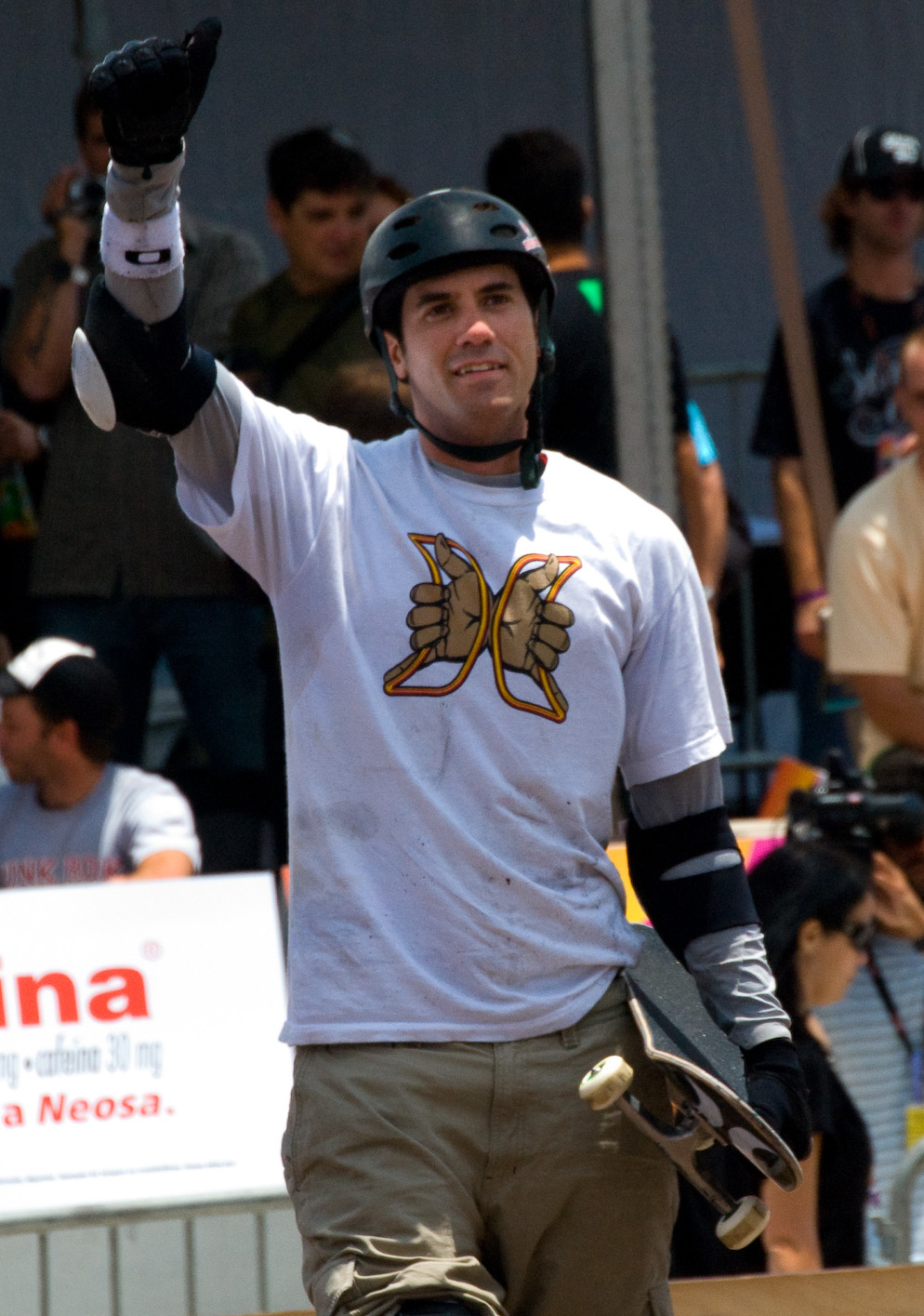
- Burnquist skating in Brazil, 2008

Personal information
- Citizenship: Brazil and United States
- Born: Robert Dean Silva Burnquist; 10 October 1976 (age 49) Rio de Janeiro, Brazil
- Occupation: Skateboarder
- Years active: 1990–present
- Height: 6 ft 2 in (188 cm)
- Website: bobburnquist.com

Sport
- Country: Brazil
- Sport: Skateboarding
- Turned pro: 1990
Medal record
Men's skateboarding
Representing Brazil
Summer X Games
Gold medal – first place	2000 San Francisco	Vert Best Trick
Gold medal – first place	2001 Philadelphia	Vert
Gold medal – first place	2003 Los Angeles	Vert Doubles
Gold medal – first place	2005 Los Angeles	Vert Best Trick
Gold medal – first place	2007 Los Angeles	Skateboard Big Air
Gold medal – first place	2008 Los Angeles	Skateboard Big Air
Gold medal – first place	2010 Los Angeles	Skateboard Big Air Rail Jam
Gold medal – first place	2011 Los Angeles	Skateboard Big Air
Gold medal – first place	2012 Los Angeles	Skateboard Big Air
Gold medal – first place	2013 Foz do Iguaçu	Skateboard Big Air
Gold medal – first place	2013 Barcelona	Skateboard Big Air
Gold medal – first place	2013 Munich	Skateboard Big Air
Gold medal – first place	2015 Austin	Skateboard Big Air
Gold medal – first place	2015 Austin	Big Air Doubles
Silver medal – second place	2002 Philadelphia	Vert
Silver medal – second place	2002 Philadelphia	Vert Doubles
Silver medal – second place	2006 Los Angeles	Vert
Silver medal – second place	2009 Los Angeles	Skateboard Big Air
Silver medal – second place	2009 Los Angeles	Skateboard Big Air Rail Jam
Silver medal – second place	2010 Los Angeles	Skateboard Big Air
Silver medal – second place	2014 Austin	Skateboard Big Air
Silver medal – second place	2015 Austin	Vert Best Trick
Bronze medal – third place	1997 San Diego	Vert
Bronze medal – third place	1998 San Diego	Vert Doubles
Bronze medal – third place	1999 San Francisco	Vert Best Trick
Bronze medal – third place	2001 Philadelphia	Vert Best Trick
Bronze medal – third place	2006 Los Angeles	Vert Best Trick
Bronze medal – third place	2006 Los Angeles	Skateboard Big Air
Bronze medal – third place	2010 Los Angeles	Vert Best Trick
Bronze medal – third place	2013 Los Angeles	Skateboard Big Air
Gravity Games
Gold medal – first place	1999 Providence	Vert

Robert Dean Silva Burnquist (Portuguese pronunciation: [ˈʁɔbɛʁtʃ ˈdzĩ ˈsiwvɐ bɐ̃(ɹ)ˈkwistʃ]; born 10 October 1976) is a Brazilian-American professional skateboarder who competed for Brazil throughout his career. In 2010, he became the first skateboarder to land a "fakie 900" (900-degree rotation starting from the reverse of natural stance), making Burnquist the fifth person in history to successfully complete the 900 trick.

== Early life ==
Burnquist was born in Rio de Janeiro, Brazil, to parents Dean Riley Burnquist and Dora Silva. His father is American of Swedish descent, while his mother is Brazilian from Minas Gerais. He has two sisters, Rebecca and Milena. He began his skateboarding training in his hometown of São Paulo at 11 years old, and turned professional at 14. He holds dual citizenship in Brazil and the United States.

== Career ==
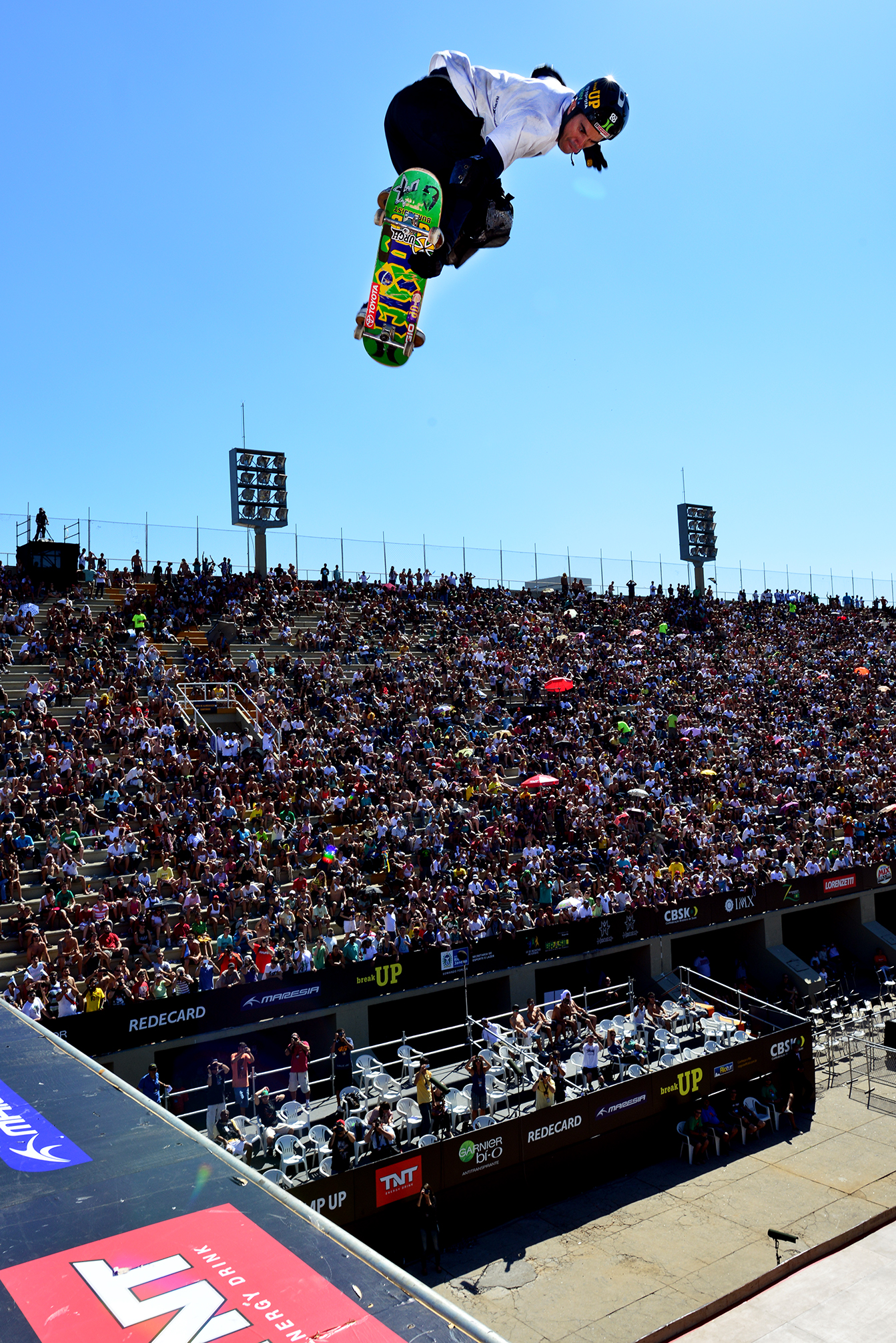
Burnquist skating in 2012

Burnquist's specialties are switch stance skateboarding, and creating vert tricks. He has a signature trick called the "Wee Willy grind".

In 2000, Burnquist won the X Games' best trick contest, with his famous Fakie 5–0 with a fakie kickflip off of the grind bar.

Burnquist's biggest success to date came in the vert contest at the 2001 X Games. Prior to his final run (the last run of the event), he was sitting in second place behind two-time defending champion, Bucky Lasek. Burnquist produced a flawless run, including multiple tricks that had never been seen before and, as a result, were unnamed. Burnquist was rewarded with a score of 98 out of 100, the second highest score ever given in any X Games skateboarding event, behind only Bucky Lasek's score of a 98.50 the year before.

Burnquist won a gold medal in the 2005 X Games Best Trick vert contest, placing fourth in the vert section, and sixth in the Big Air contest.

In 2006, Burnquist completed a BASE jump after attempting a 50-50 into the Grand Canyon. The first attempt nearly cost Burnquist his life after he missed the rail and fell out of control, before regaining himself and successfully deploying his parachute. After some adjustments to the take-off ramp, his second attempt went flawlessly. This stunt was shown in an episode of the television show Stunt Junkies.

At the 2013 X Games in Barcelona, Burnquist became the first skater to ever win gold on four consecutive occasions in Skateboard Big Air (2011–2012 in Los Angeles, 2013 Foz do Iguaçu, 2013 Barcelona being his prior victories). He also tied BMX rider Dave Mirra as the athlete with the most career X Games medals, with 24. In the 2013 X Games in Munich, Burnquist continued to make history by winning another gold medal in Skateboard Big Air, extending his win streak in the event to five consecutive years - another new record, and making him the sole owner of the record for most career X Games medals in history, with 25.

At X Games Austin 2015, Burnquist won the gold medal in Skateboard Big Air, after having sustained a non-displaced fracture of his left forearm which he suffered during vert practice the same week. On day three, Burnquist won another gold medal in Big Air Doubles, in its very first appearance in X Games. His partner was BMX rider Morgan Wade as they scored a total of 90 points (43 from Morgan, 47 from Burnquist). Burnquist finished off Austin 2015 with a silver in Vert best trick, bringing him to a total of 30 Summer X Games medals, including 14 gold, with both stats being records.

At X Games Minneapolis 2017, Burnquist announced his retirement from the X Games, having earned at least one medal at the event every year from 1997 through 2015 (with the exception of 2004). He holds the record for most medals won at the X Games by an individual, with a total of 30 (14 gold, 8 silver and 8 bronze), and shares the record for most gold medals at the Summer X Games, with a total of 14 (tied with Dave Mirra and Jamie Bestwick). He is the only person to have competed in every single X Games summer event, beginning with the inaugural competition in 1995, every year through to 2017.

== Bob Burnquist's Dreamland ==
Burnquist's home in Vista, California is home to his private skate park, Dreamland. The first build in his backyard skate park was a Wooden Vert Bowl (which was later concreted). This was followed by a metal full pipe, a loop with an opening gap in the roof (built for King of Skate 2002) and a corkscrew.

The Vert Bowl has been skated by dozens of skateboarders, including Colin McKay, Tony Hawk, Rune Glifberg, Bucky Lasek, and Lincoln Ueda, and has been featured in hundreds of magazines and videos, including Tony Hawk's Trick Tips and Thrasher Magazine.

The biggest build on the site is the Megaramp. Burnquist's Megaramp is one of the world's few permanent Mega Ramps. The ramp is made up of a 50–70 foot gap jump, followed straight away by a 30-foot quarterpipe. Burnquist opens the ramp to other professionals to enable them to train for Mega ramp competitions and to help advance the progress of tricks on the Mega Ramp. Skateboarders such as Elliot Sloan, Danny Way and Jake Brown have all made use of the ramp.

The latest major addition to the park was a hip ramp built at a 90° angle to the quarter pipe section of the Mega Ramp. This addition was built in 2013 as part of the filming of Burnquist's video Dreamland.

In 2013, Burnquist, alongside his sponsor Oakley, released a major video part titled Oakley's-Bob Burnquist's "Dreamland". The video is all filmed within the Dreamland compound.

== Media ==
In 1994, Burnquist appeared in a short clip talking about the effects of gravity on the second episode (aptly titled "Gravity") of the first season of Bill Nye the Science Guy.

Burnquist has been featured in the video game, Tony Hawk's Pro Skater, and has appeared in every game in the Tony Hawk's series up to Proving Ground, with the exception of Pro Skater 3, due to a result of his appearance in another skateboarding game, ESPN X Games Skateboarding, during that time.

In 2004, Burnquist made a guest appearance as himself on the popular TV series, Kim Possible. Burnquist was also featured in a commercial for Aero chocolate bars. He also made a brief cameo in the 2003 skateboarding film Grind.

In 2013, Burnquist appeared as himself on season 2, episode 4 of Stan Lee's Superhumans.

Burnquist served as a pundit for TV Globo's coverage of the skateboarding events in the 2020 Summer Olympics.

== Philanthropy ==
Burnquist started the Bob Burnquist Foundation to bring knowledge about organic farming and gardening to schools, and was one of the founders of the Action Sports Environmental Coalition, a nonprofit organization that brings ecological awareness to skateboarders, surfers and BMXers. In an interview in 2010, Burnquist stated, "Well, the latest is that we're working with a restaurant chain called the Chipotle Grill- they've got good values, trying to make food with integrity- and I'm starting an organic garden that they've committed to studying and seeing what they can use in their own kitchens."

In May 2020 Burnquist founded the Instituto Skate Cuida as an initiative to support vulnerable communities in Brazil and elsewhere by using skateboarding as an introduction to arts, culture, education, and skills development including programming and web3. The institute has partnerships with various institutions such as Banco do Brasil, Ademáfia Institute, Nova Era Institute, and CemporcentoSKATE. The Instituto Skate Cuida maintains a fundraising project on the public goods-focused, web3-based platform Giveth.

== Filmography ==
- és Menikmati
- Anti Hero's self-titled video "Anti Hero"
- Anti Hero's first video "Fucktards"
- Tony Hawk's Gigantic Skatepark Tour: 2000, 2001 and 2002
- Tony Hawk's Boom Boom Huck Jam North American Tour (2003)
- MVP 2: Most Vertical Primate (2002)
- The Firm's "Can't Stop"
- Flip's "Extremely Sorry"
- Viva La Bam
- A Hurley International skateboarding documentary "Hallowed Ground"
- Oakley's-Bob Burnquist's "Dreamland"

== Contest history ==
- 2nd in 2015 X Games Austin Vert Best Trick
- 1st in 2015 X Games Austin Big Air Doubles
- 1st in 2015 X Games Austin Big Air
- 2nd in 2014 X Games Austin Big Air
- 3rd in 2013 X Games Los Angeles Big Air
- 1st in 2013 X Games Munich Big Air
- 1st in 2013 X Games Barcelona Big Air
- 1st in 2013 X Games Foz do Iguacu Big Air
- 1st in 2012 X Games Big Air
- 1st in 2011 X Games Big Air
- 1st in 2010 X Games Big Air Rail Jam
- 3rd in 2010 X Games Vert Best Trick
- 2nd in 2010 X Games Big Air
- 2nd in 2009 X Games Big Air
- 2nd in 2009 X Games Big Air Rail Jam
- 3rd in 2009 Maloof Money Cup
- 1st in 2008 X Games Big Air
- 1st in 2007 X Games Big Air
- 2nd in 2006 X Games Vert
- 3rd in 2006 X Games Vert Best Trick
- 3rd in 2006 X Games Big Air
- 1st in 2006 The Coolio Games
- 1st in 2005 X Games Vert Best Trick
- 1st in 2003 X Games vert doubles (with Bucky Lasek)
- 2nd in 2002 X Games vert doubles (with Bucky Lasek)
- 2nd in 2002 X Games Vert
- 3rd in 2001 X Games Vert Best Trick
- 1st in 2001 X Games vert
- 1st in 2001 Slam City Jam vert.
- 1st in 2000 X Games Vert Best Trick
- 1st in 2000 Slam City Jam vert.
- 3rd in 1999 X Games Vert Best Trick
- 3rd in 1998 X Games Vert Doubles
- 3rd in 1997 X Games Vert
- 4th in 1996 Gravity Games Jam vert.
- 1st in 1995 Slam City Jam vert.
