= Kevin Robinson (BMX rider) =

American freestyle bicycle motocross rider (1971–2017)

Personal information
- Nickname: "K-Rob"
- Nationality: American
- Born: December 19, 1971 East Providence, Rhode Island
- Died: December 9, 2017 (aged 45) East Providence, Rhode Island
- Occupation: Freestyle BMX Rider
- Height: 6 ft 0 in (183 cm)
- Weight: 199 lb (90 kg)
- Spouse: Robin Adams Robinson (m. ?–2017)
- Children: 1 daughter, 2 sons

Sport
- Sport: BMX
Medal record
Summer X Games
Representing United States
Gold medal – first place	2006 Los Angeles	BMX Vert Best Trick
Gold medal – first place	2006 Los Angeles	BMX Big Air
Gold medal – first place	2007 Los Angeles	BMX Big Air
Gold medal – first place	2009 Los Angeles	BMX Big Air
Bronze medal – third place	2003 Los Angeles	BMX Vert
Bronze medal – third place	2004 Los Angeles	BMX Vert
Bronze medal – third place	2005 Los Angeles	BMX Vert
Bronze medal – third place	2007 Los Angeles	BMX Vert
Bronze medal – third place	2008 Los Angeles	BMX Big Air
Bronze medal – third place	2012 Los Angeles	BMX Big Air
Gravity Games
Silver medal – second place	2001 Providence	BMX Vert
Silver medal – second place	2003 Cleveland	BMX Vert
- Updated on July 8, 2018

Kevin Robinson (December 19, 1971 – December 9, 2017) nicknamed K-Rob was a professional freestyle BMX rider. Widely recognized as one of the best riders of all time, Robinson was integral in creating Megaramp disciplines for BMX. Aside from this, Robinson was most notable for two stunts in his career: He was the first to successfully land a Double Flair (double backflip with 180 degree horizontal rotation) in competition at the 2006 X Games and, in 2016, set the Guinness World record for the highest air on a BMX bike (27 feet) in his home town of East Providence, Rhode Island. Robinson was a longtime receiver of sponsorship from Hoffman Bikes, Red Bull, and Target. Robinson died of a stroke, ten days shy of his 46th birthday, on December 9, 2017.

== Video Game Appearances ==
Kevin Robinson was featured in Mat Hoffman's Pro BMX for the PlayStation and Mat Hoffman's Pro BMX 2 for the Xbox (console), PlayStation 2, Game Boy Advance and the GameCube. To promote the second game, Kevin as well as the other pro BMX riders featured went on a tour with 90 minutes of footage being used in the game.

== X Games competition history ==
GOLD (4) SILVER (0) BRONZE (6)
YEAR	X GAMES	EVENTS	RANK	MEDAL
1995	Extreme Games	BMX Vert	8th	
1998	Summer X Games IV	BMX Vert Double	7th	
1999	Summer X Games V	BMX Vert	8th	
2000	Summer X Games VI	BMX Vert	6th	
2001	Summer X Games VII	BMX Vert	4th	
2002	Summer X Games VIII	BMX Vert	4th	
2003	Summer X Games IX	BMX Vert	3rd	Bronze medal
2004	Summer X Games X	BMX Vert	3rd	Bronze medal
2005	Summer X Games XI	BMX Vert	3rd	Bronze medal
2005	Summer X Games XI	BMX Vert Best Trick	8th	
2006	Summer X Games XII	BMX Vert	4th	
2006	Summer X Games XII	BMX Vert Best Trick	1st	Gold medal
2006	Summer X Games XII	BMX Big Air	1st	Gold medal
2007	Summer X Games XIII	BMX Big Air	1st	Gold medal
2007	Summer X Games XIII	BMX Vert	3rd	Bronze medal
2008	Summer X Games XIV	BMX Big Air	3rd	Bronze medal
2008	Summer X Games XIV	BMX Vert	7th	
2009	Summer X Games XV	BMX Big Air	1st	Gold medal
2009	Summer X Games XV	BMX Vert	9th	
2010	Summer X Games XVI	BMX Big Air	6th	
2010	Summer X Games XVI	BMX Vert	8th	
2012	Summer X Games XVIII	BMX Big Air	3rd	Bronze medal
2013	X Games Foz do Iguacu 2013	BMX Big Air	7th	
2013	X Games Los Angeles 2013	BMX Big Air	6th	
