= Lyn-Z Adams Hawkins =

American professional skateboarder (born 1989)

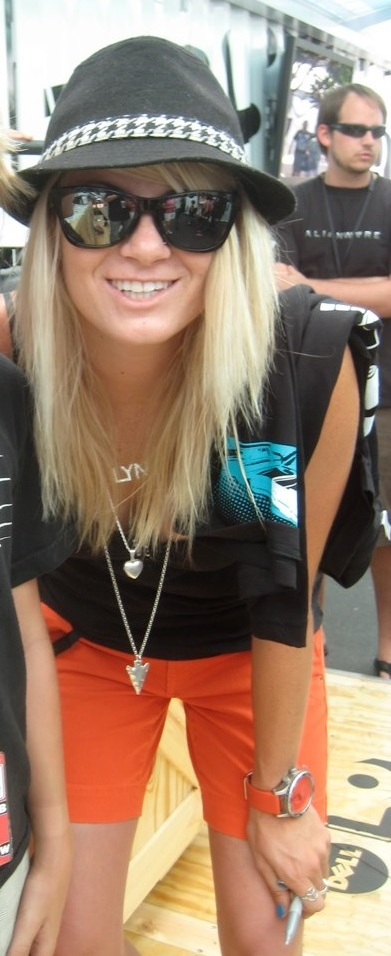
- Hawkins at the X Games XV in 2009

Personal information
- Full name: Lyndsey Adams Hawkins Pastrana
- Born: September 21, 1989 (age 37) San Diego, California, U.S.
- Occupations: Skateboarder, snowboarder
- Years active: 1995–present
- Height: 5 ft 4 in (1.63 m)
- Spouse: Travis Pastrana (m. 2011)
- Children: 2

Sport
- Country: United States
- Sport: Skateboarding
- Turned pro: 2004
Medal record
Summer X Games
Gold medal – first place	2004 Los Angeles	Vert
Gold medal – first place	2007 Los Angeles	Vert
Gold medal – first place	2009 Los Angeles	Vert
Silver medal – second place	2003 Los Angeles	Park
Silver medal – second place	2005 Los Angeles	Vert
Silver medal – second place	2008 Los Angeles	Vert
Silver medal – second place	2010 Los Angeles	Vert
Bronze medal – third place	2003 Los Angeles	Vert

Lyndsey "Lyn-Z" Adams Hawkins Pastrana (born September 21, 1989) is an American professional skateboarder.

== History and family ==
Born in San Diego, Lyn-Z Adams Hawkins was raised in Cardiff-by-the-Sea, California, and spent part of her childhood in Sayulita, Mexico, just outside Puerto Vallarta. An athletic child, Hawkins started surfing and skateboarding at age 6. She got into skateboarding when her brother Tyler bought her a membership at the Encinitas YMCA. She also played soccer, baseball, basketball, and gymnastics.

Her legal name is Lyndsey, and Adams is her middle name. She started using the nickname Lyn-Z in the 4th grade.

Hawkins often customizes the griptape on her skateboards. Many bear the letters RIP, in memory of her father, who died in December 2003.

On June 4, 2011, Hawkins became engaged to Travis Pastrana, who stopped the show at the Nitro Circus Live World Tour in Las Vegas, got on one knee, and proposed. The two married on October 29, 2011, near Hawkins' southern California home.

On February 26, 2013, Hawkins and Pastrana announced on their social network webpages that they were expecting their first child due in September 2013. Hawkins gave birth to a girl, Addy, on Labor Day, September 2, 2013. On August 5, 2014, she announced that she and Pastrana were expecting another child, and on February 9, 2015, their second girl, Bristol, was born.

== Skateboarding ==
Hawkins was at the forefront of professional female skateboarding. She is also one of a few skaters to skate the DC Mega Ramp, and the first female skater to do so.

Due to a broken arm in 2005, and a torn ACL (resulting in surgery) in 2006, Lyn-Z has missed out on many competitions. In lieu of participating, she was the on-camera host for the girls competition at the West 49 Canadian Open in Hamilton, Ontario in September 2006.

In 2007, Hawkins returned to competition, and won the gold medal in the Women's Vert competition at X Games 13 in Los Angeles. In 2008, she placed second in the same competition, and in 2009 she returned to win another gold medal in 1st place, also in the Women's Vert competition.

Major sponsors include Volcom, Nixon Watches, Birdhouse Skateboards, Oakley eyewear, Type-S wheels, S-one helmets, and K-five Boardshop.

In 2008, Hawkins appeared on the cover of Concrete Wave Magazine's annual Skateboard Directory.

On November 21, 2009, Hawkins became the first female to land a 540 McTwist during the "Quiksilver Tony Hawk Show" in Paris, France.

== Snowboarding ==
While focused mainly on skateboarding, Hawkins is also an avid snowboarder. She has recently begun entering snowboarding competitions. In 2007, her year-end National ranking was 23rd in Slopestyle and 9th in Halfpipe.

== Video games ==
Hawkins made her video game debut in Tony Hawk's Project 8, becoming the second playable female professional skater in the Tony Hawk games after Elissa Steamer. She later appeared in Tony Hawk: Ride, Tony Hawk: Shred, and Tony Hawk's Pro Skater HD.

== Sponsors ==
- Etnies
- Nixon Watches
- Birdhouse Skateboards
- Type S Wheels
- k-5 Boardshop
- Kicker
- Volcom
- Ethika

== Skateboard videos ==
Hawkins is featured on a number of skate DVDs including Getting Nowhere Faster and the Groms series of DVDs , which highlight some of the top Grommets in various Extreme Sports.

== Major contest results ==
Year	Title	Result
2010	X Games 16, Los Angeles, California	2nd place (vert)
2009	X Games 15, Los Angeles, California	1st place (vert)
2009	ISF Skateboarding World Championships, Boston, Massachusetts	1st place (vert)
2008	X Games 14, Los Angeles, California	2nd place (vert)
2007	X Games 13, Los Angeles, California	1st place (vert)
2007	Soul Bowl, Huntington Beach, California	2nd place (bowl)
2007	Pro Tec Pool Party, Orange, California	2nd place (bowl)
2005	West 49 Canadian Open, Toronto, Ontario	20th place (street)
2005	Pro Tec Pool Party, Orange, California	5th place (bowl)
2005	X Games 11, Los Angeles, California	2nd place (vert)
2005	X Games 11, Los Angeles, California	9th place (street)
2005	Globe World Cup, Melbourne, Australia	4th place (street)
2005	Globe World Cup, Melbourne, Australia	8th place (mens vert – best trick)
2005	Tampa Am, Tampa, Florida	3rd place (mens vert)
2004	X Games 10, Los Angeles, California	1st place (vert)
2004	X Games 10, Los Angeles, California	4th place (street)
2004	Gallaz Skate Jam, Dortmund, Germany	6th place (street)
2004	Vans Triple Crown, Cleveland, Ohio	99th place (street)
2004	Vans Triple Crown, Cleveland, Ohio	14th place (mens vert)
2004	Vans Triple Crown, Vancouver, British Columbia	12th place (street)
2004	Vans Triple Crown, Vancouver, British Columbia	8th place (vert)
2004	Globe World Cup, Melbourne, Australia	8th place (street)
2003	X Games 9, Los Angeles, California	3rd place (vert)
2003	X Games 9, Los Angeles, California	2nd place (street)
2003	Next Cup, Aguanga, California	2nd place (mens street)
2003	Next Cup, Aguanga, California	3rd place (highest wall)
2003	Slam City Jam, Vancouver, British Columbia	3rd place (vert)
2003	Slam City Jam, Vancouver, British Columbia	5th place (street)
2003	West 49 Canadian Open, Toronto, Ontario	14th place (street)
2002	Slam City Jam, Vancouver, British Columbia	3rd place (vert)
2002	Slam City Jam, Vancouver, British Columbia	5th place (street)
