= Bucky Lasek =

American skateboarder and rally cross driver

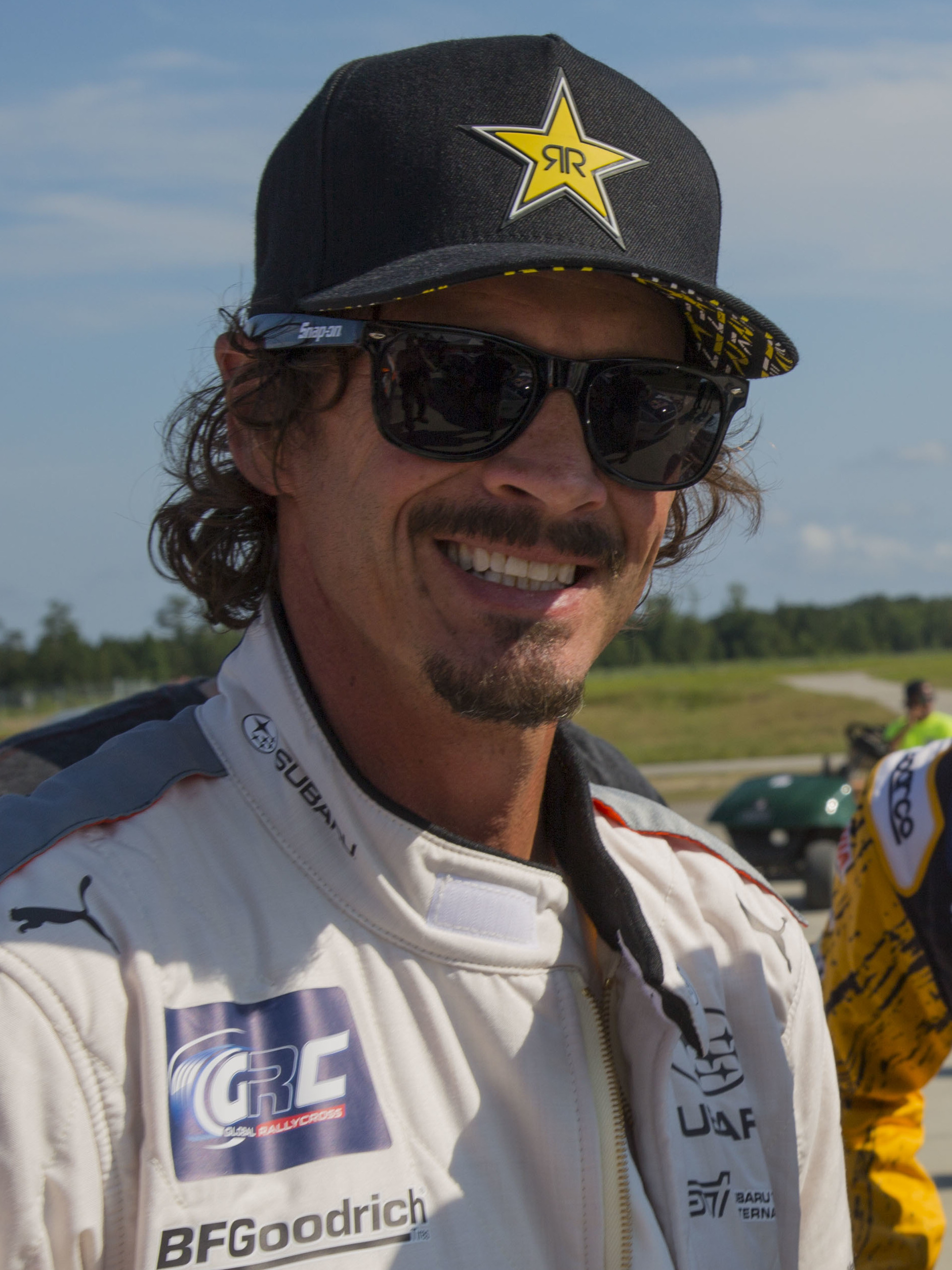
- Lasek in 2016

Personal information
- Full name: Charles Michael Lasek
- Born: December 3, 1972 (age 53) Baltimore, Maryland, U.S.
- Occupations: Professional skateboarder; rallycross driver
- Years active: 1984–present
- Height: 5 ft 10 in (178 cm)
- Weight: 155 lb (70 kg)

Global Rallycross career
- Debut season: 2012
- Current team: Lasek Rallysport
- Car number: 801
- Former teams: Subaru Rally Team USA
- Starts: 34
- Wins: 0
- Podiums: 3
- Best finish: 8th in 2014
- Finished last season: 12th

Sport
- Country: United States
- Sport: Skateboarding, rallying
- Turned pro: 1990
Medal record
Men's skateboarding
Representing United States
Summer X Games
Gold medal – first place	1999 San Francisco	Vert
Gold medal – first place	2000 San Francisco	Vert
Gold medal – first place	2003 Los Angeles	Vert
Gold medal – first place	2003 Los Angeles	Vert Doubles
Gold medal – first place	2004 Los Angeles	Vert
Gold medal – first place	2006 Los Angeles	Vert Best Trick
Gold medal – first place	2013 Foz do Iguaçu	Vert
Gold medal – first place	2013 Barcelona	Vert
Gold medal – first place	2013 Munich	Vert
Gold medal – first place	2013 Los Angeles	Vert
Silver medal – second place	1998 San Diego	Vert Doubles
Silver medal – second place	1999 San Francisco	Vert Doubles
Silver medal – second place	2001 Philadelphia	Vert
Silver medal – second place	2002 Philadelphia	Vert Doubles
Silver medal – second place	2008 Los Angeles	Vert
Silver medal – second place	2009 Los Angeles	Vert
Silver medal – second place	2012 Los Angeles	Vert
Silver medal – second place	2014 Austin	RallyCross
Bronze medal – third place	2006 Los Angeles	Vert
Bronze medal – third place	2011 Los Angeles	Vert

Charles Michael "Bucky" Lasek (born December 3, 1972) is an American professional skateboarder and rallycross driver.

== Career ==
=== Professional skateboarding ===
Born in Baltimore, Maryland, Lasek started skateboarding at the age of 12, shortly after his bike was stolen. After entering amateur contests, he was quickly noticed by Powell Peralta talent scouts in 1987. Powell Peralta promptly sponsored Lasek and introduced him in a 1987 publication as a 14 year old newly-sponsored amateur who "rides a mini-Caballero with X-Bones." Lasek made his video debut in the fourth Bones Brigade video, Public Domain (1988).

As of May 2009, Lasek owns a backyard concrete skateboarding bowl named "Lasekland".

=== Professional racing ===
In May 2012, Lasek was one of three drivers selected by Subaru Rally Team USA to compete in the 2012 Global RallyCross Championship. Lasek continued with the team earning several second and third place finishes through his career with Subaru. He left the team after the 2016 season.

=== Video game appearances ===
Lasek is a playable character in the first five games in the Tony Hawk's series: Tony Hawk's Pro Skater through Tony Hawk's Underground. He later reprised his role in Tony Hawk's Pro Skater 1 + 2, a remake of the first two games in the series, and in the sequel Tony Hawk's Pro Skater 3 + 4.

=== Film and television ===
Lasek made a cameo appearance in the low-budget 2003 movie Haggard, in which he hands a skateboard to Bam Margera while he runs from the villain Hellboy. He appeared in MTV's reality television series Viva La Bam and in the music video for Pink's single "Raise Your Glass". He served as a stunt double in the 2003 movie Grind. He also made an appearance as himself in an episode of The Jersey called "What's Gotten Into Elliott Rifkin?", and also attended the sixth dinner service of Hell's Kitchen's 21st season.

== Personal life ==
As of June 2015, Lasek resides in Encinitas, California with his wife Jennifer (m. September 1996) and their three daughters.

== Contest results ==
As of 2016, Lasek has won 13 medals at the X Games, including ten gold medals, and is one of only two vert skateboarders to have won three X Games gold medals consecutively—the other is Pierre-Luc Gagnon. Lasek is also one of only three athletes to compete at every X Games since the series' inception in 1995.

- 1st 2013 X Games (Los Angeles): Vert
- 1st 2013 X Games (Munich): Vert
- 1st 2013 X Games (Barcelona): Vert
- 1st 2013 x Games (Foz do Iguacu): Vert
- 1st 2013 Vans Pool Party
- 2nd 2012 X Games: Vert
- 3rd 2011 X Games: Vert
- 1st 2010 Vans Pro-Tec Pool Party: Pro Division
- 1st 2009 Dew Action Sports Tour: Vert
- 1st 2009 Vans Pro-Tec Pool Party: Pro Division
- 1st 2008 Dew Action Sports Tour: Vert
- 1st 2006 Dew Action Sports Tour: Vert
- 1st 2006 X Games: Vert Best Trick
- 1st 2005 Dew Action Sports Tour: Vert
- 1st 2004 Vans Triple Crown
- 1st 2004 Gravity Games
- 1st 2004 Slam City Jam
- 1st 2003 X Games: Vert
- 1st 2003 X Games: Vert Doubles (with Bob Burnquist)
- 1st 2002 Slam City Jam: Vert
- 2nd 2002 X Games VIII: Vert Doubles (with Bob Burnquist)
- 2nd 2001 X Games: Vert
- 1st 2000 X Games: Vert
- 1st 1999 X Games Vert

== Racing record ==
=== Complete Global RallyCross Championship results ===
==== Supercar ====
Year	Entrant	Car	1	2	3	4	5	6	7	8	9	10	11	12	GRC	Points
2012	Subaru Puma Rallycross Team USA	Subaru Impreza WRX STI	CHA; 11	TEX; 14	LA; 13	LOU; 11	LV; 8	LVC; 7							13th	35
2013	Subaru Puma Rallycross Team USA	Subaru Impreza WRX STI	BRA	MUN1; 14	MUN2; 11	LOU; 8	BRI; 12	IRW; 11	ATL; 12	CHA; 16	LV; 14				11th	49
2014	Subaru Rally Team USA	Subaru Impreza WRX STI	BAR; 13	AUS; 2	DC; 11	NY; 12	CHA; 6	DAY; 3	LA1; 11	LA2; 5	SEA; 14	LV; 3			8th	215
2015	Subaru Rally Team USA	Subaru Impreza WRX STI	FTA; 10	DAY1; DNS	DAY2; 12	MCAS; 7	DET1; 11	DET2; 8	DC	LA1; DNS	LA2; DNS	BAR1	BAR2	LV; 8	12th	88
2016	Subaru Rally Team USA	Subaru Impreza WRX STI	PHO1	PHO2	DAL	DAY1	DAY2	MCAS1; 10	MCAS2^{†}	DC; 9	AC; 10	SEA	LA1	LA2	15th	34

^{†}Race canceled
