= Jake Brown (skateboarder) =

Australian skateboarder (born 1974)

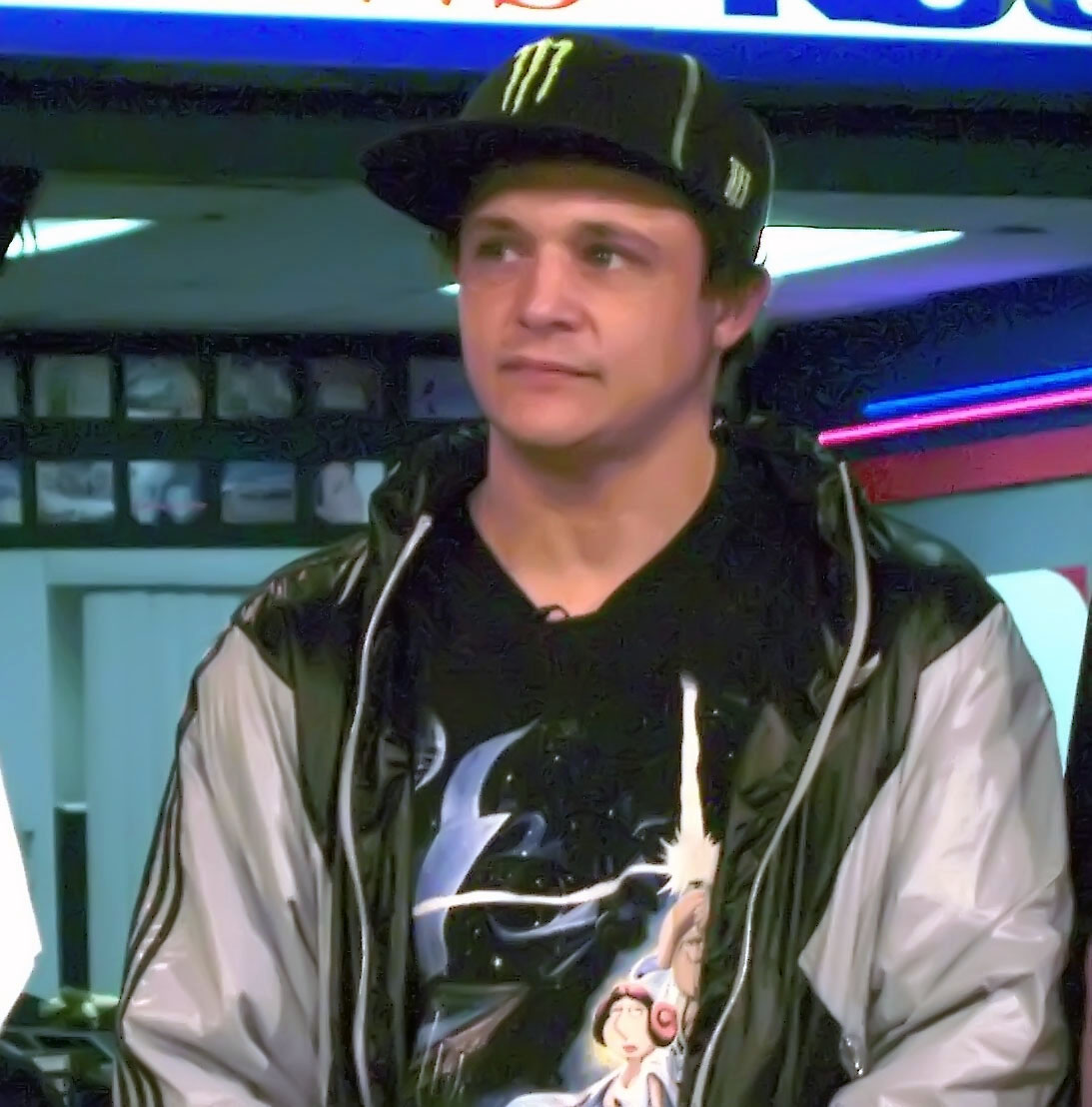
- Brown in San Diego, 2009

Personal information
- Born: 6 September 1974 (age 52) Sydney
- Height: 5 ft 6 in (1.68 m)
- Weight: 145 lb (66 kg)

Sport
- Country: Australia
- Sport: Skateboarding
Medal record
Summer X Games
Representing Australia
Gold medal – first place	2009 Los Angeles	Big Air
Gold medal – first place	2010 Los Angeles	Big Air
Silver medal – second place	2006 Los Angeles	Big Air
Silver medal – second place	2007 Los Angeles	Big Air
Bronze medal – third place	2008 Los Angeles	Big Air
Bronze medal – third place	2013 Foz do Iguaçu	Big Air

Jake Brown (born 6 September 1974) is an Australian skateboarder who specialises in transition skateboarding. He began competing in 1996 and regularly appears as a contestant in the X Games contest events. Brown has also successfully skateboarded the "MegaRamp" structure, on which he is the first person to ever perform a 720-degree rotation without grabbing his board as of September 2013.

He lost control of his board while competing in the X Games in 2007, falling from a height of 14 meters (45 feet) and sustaining severe injuries. Despite this, he recovered and went on to win gold in the same tournament in 2009 and successfully defended his title in 2010. It is considered one of the most infamous wipeouts in extreme sports history.

== Early life ==
Following the divorce of Brown's parents, he resided in Sydney with his mother until he was 12 years old, and then lived with his father, also in Sydney, until he was 16 years old. Brown left his arrangement with his father to relocate to Melbourne so that he could skateboard more frequently.

== Professional skateboarding ==
During an Australian tour in the mid-1990s, professional skateboarder Danny Way, the inventor of the MegaRamp, was impressed by Brown's skateboarding and encouraged him to relocate to the United States (US). Way explained in 2013, "The first time I met Jake, right then I knew this kid has got some crazy talent. His ability to skate at 15 was abnormal and it was obvious that Jake was going to be a future skateboarding star." At the time, skateboarding was not a form of paid employment for Australian-based skateboarders, so Brown made a decision to move to Southern California in 1997, inspired by the success of other Australians such as Jason Ellis.

Brown was sponsored by Blind and appeared in the What If? video. In April 2012, Brown parted ways with the brand to join the SK8MAFIA team, co-founded by close friend and professional skateboarder Peter Smolik. As part of the announcement of Brown's departure from Blind, the company's brand manager Bill Weiss stated:

Jake Brown is one of the most dynamic, positive and genuine skateboarders I have ever met and been lucky enough to call my friend and I wish him nothing but the best on his next adventure. I cant wait to see what Jake’s got up his sleeve next.

At the April 2013 X Games event in Brazil, Brown completed the first ever 720-degree ollie in the "Big Air" event on the MegaRamp structure, and repeated the feat during the same year at the X Games event in Barcelona, Spain.

Brown appeared in Electronic Arts' Skate video game series, debuting in the spin-off Skate It, before appearing in the sequel, Skate 2.

=== 2007 X Games fall ===
On 2 August 2007, during the Summer X Games 2007 Big Air section, Brown fell 45 feet (14 m) onto the bottom of the ramp below. The impact was so violent that Brown's shoes flew off of his feet and landed several feet away. Brown's injuries included a fractured wrist, fractured vertebrae, bruised liver, bruised lung, ruptured spleen and concussion. After several minutes of unconsciousness, Brown walked off the ramp surface with assistance.

Following the accident, Brown appeared on the television programs Larry King Live, The Today Show, Shockwave, Most Daring, Destroyed in Seconds, and MTV. Following his recovery, Brown then won the gold medal in the Big Air event two years later at X Games L.A. and then defended his title in 2010.

In a 2013 news article, Brown admitted that "I thought I was good right away, but it took me a couple of years to mentally get back to where I wanted to be." Danny Way explained in the same article, "Jake's fall was catastrophic. Those types of things put what we do into perspective. It's what we fear most. That's the reality of the risk."

=== Sponsors ===
As of September 2013, Brown is sponsored by Laced Clothing, Monster Energy, Real Life Pillage, Spitfire Wheels, and Independent Trucks.

== Company owner ==
Brown officially founded the Laced clothing company in 2012 with Smolik, but the brand has appeared in public since 2010. Laced is described as "a brand that lives by the wisdom that everyone and everything is connected ITS NOT A RELIGION ITS A REVOLUTION."

Following the 2013 decision to relocate the US X Games event to the state of Texas, representatives of the company, such as Brown, Smolik, and skateboarder Steven Cales, donated food and clothing to homeless people in the area nearby the Staples Center venue where the X Games was held for eleven years. Laced worked in partnership with Homeboy Industries, a company that provides opportunities for ex-gang members according to the motto of "Jobs Not Jails," and Warning skateboard shop—both are based in Los Angeles.

As of September 2013, the Laced team—called "Messengers" on the brand's website—consists of Brown, Smolik, and professional skateboarders Sean Sheffey and Damian Bravo, while the company is based in San Diego, California, US

== Awards ==
Transworld Skateboarding magazine named Brown the "Vert Skater of the Year" for its 2005 awards ceremony.

== Contest history ==
For the LG Action Sports contest series, Brown won the half-pipe ramp competition in Beijing, China in 2004 and placed 2nd in Paris, France in 2005.

Brown has won five medals in the X-Games competitions, two of which are gold medals. He attained medals in the Big Air event every year from 2006 to 2010. Brown explained in 2012 that skateboarders whose primary discipline is vert ramp skateboarding must compete in contests to maintain a career, as "there's no real market for a vert skater who doesn't do contests, so you can't really just get paid to go out and film video parts."

== Influence ==
Brown has received praise from successful, longtime skateboarders such as Way and Bob Burnquist. In August 2013, Way stated:

It's not about how hard he [Brown] can fall; he's one of the guys out there that's innovating. He's progressing the sport. He's on the cutting edge in that small group of guys that moves the meter ... He's someone that matters to this sport. The entire world of skateboarding respects Jake ... Jake is one of the few guys on the skate ramp that I look up to. He's one of those guys that motivate me. He's a guy that I look to and think, "What's Jake doing?" That's inspiring. Jake is one of the most innovative guys I've ever seen on the ramp ... He's a guy that matters to the progression and the relevance of the sport. He has global respect amongst the industry.

Burnquist, who owns one of the two permanent MegaRamps in existence as of August 2013, provided additional praise:

Even if Jake Brown hadn't won any X Games medals ever, and he does, he has six and a couple golds, it doesn't matter because he's a giant in skateboarding. He's one of those guys that's not just a competition guy, he progresses. He's been one of my favourites for a long time. His approach to skateboarding, his style, his personality, he's just unique. There's no one like him.
