= Danny Way =

American professional skateboarder (born 1974)

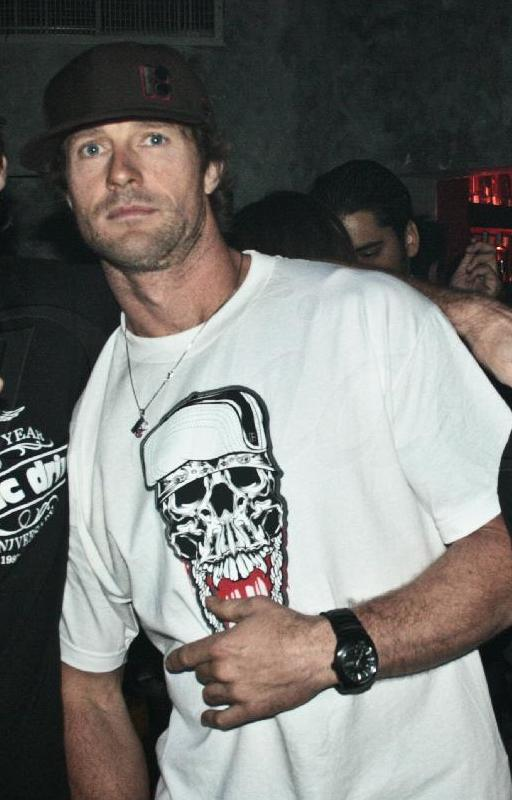
- Way in 2007

Personal information
- Born: April 15, 1974 (age 52) Portland, Oregon, U.S.
- Height: 6 ft 1 in (1.85 m)
- Weight: 180 lb (82 kg)

Sport
- Country: United States
- Sport: Skateboarding
Medal record
Summer X Games
Representing United States
| Gold medal – first place | 1995 Newport | High Air |
| Gold medal – first place | 2004 Los Angeles | Big Air |
| Gold medal – first place | 2005 Los Angeles | Big Air |
| Gold medal – first place | 2006 Los Angeles | Big Air |
| Gold medal – first place | 2009 Los Angeles | Big Air Rail Jam |
| Silver medal – second place | 2008 Los Angeles | Big Air |

Danny Way (born April 15, 1974) is an American professional skateboarder. He was awarded Thrasher magazine's "Skater of the Year" award twice. He is known for extreme stunts, such as jumping into a skateboard ramp from a helicopter; that was featured on the cover of Transworld Skateboarding magazine. One of his more notable stunts was jumping the Great Wall of China on a skateboard via megaramp.

== Early life ==
Way was born in Portland, Oregon, and grew up in San Diego, California. His childhood was marred by difficult circumstances. His father, Dennis Way, died before Danny's first birthday – Dennis was jailed for failing to pay child support to his previous wife, and after nine days in jail was found hanged in his cell; his death was ruled a suicide. Following his father's death, his mother Mary dated a number of men who abused Mary, Danny, and his brother Damon. Mary subsequently remarried, to Tim O'Dea, who introduced Danny and Damon to skateboarding and surfing. The couple subsequently divorced and Tim died following a surfing session. Danny lost another adult in his life when his childhood mentor Mike Ternasky was killed by an elderly driver who ran a stop sign.

== Professional skateboarding ==
Danny Way became the youngest person (15 yrs old) to win a pro vert skateboarding contest at the World Skateboard Association Pro Vert Contest in Lansing, Michigan, sponsored by Modern Skate & Surf in 1989. Way was introduced in the Powell Peralta skateboard company's video "Public Domain" in the late 80's and H-Street skateboard company's videos Shackle Me Not and Hokus Pokus and, shortly afterwards in 1991, co-founded the skateboard company Plan B, together with Mike Ternasky. He has been injured repeatedly, including breaking his neck in 1994, and as of 2009 having undergone 13 operations.

=== Plan B (1991–1998) ===
The Plan B company was formed as part of the Dwindle Distribution company, at that time overseen by Steve Rocco and Rodney Mullen, and, like Way, Ternasky was also formerly with H-Street, where he co-managed the company with Tony Magnusson. Ternasky, to the dismay of Magnusson, managed to convince numerous H-Street team riders to resign and assist with the development of the new brand. Ternasky's intention was to create a "super team" with riders such as Way, Colin McKay, Mullen, Mike Carroll, Matt Hensley, Dan Peterka, Rick Howard and Tas Pappas.

=== Alien Workshop (1999–2004) ===
After the original iteration of Plan B folded in 1998, Danny was sponsored by Alien Workshop. During his time with the company, Way had numerous pro model boards and was featured in photo advertisements. He also competed in the OP King of Skate competition. Danny was featured in two skateboarding video games: MTV Sports: Skateboarding featuring Andy MacDonald and Evolution Skateboarding.

=== DC Shoes (1994–2023) ===
Danny was the first pro skateboarder for DC Shoes when the brand was founded in 1994. In the first advertisement for his first pro model shoe, Way stood still because he suffered a neck injury while surfing. DC removed Way from their skateboard team in November 2023.

=== Plan B (2005–onwards) ===
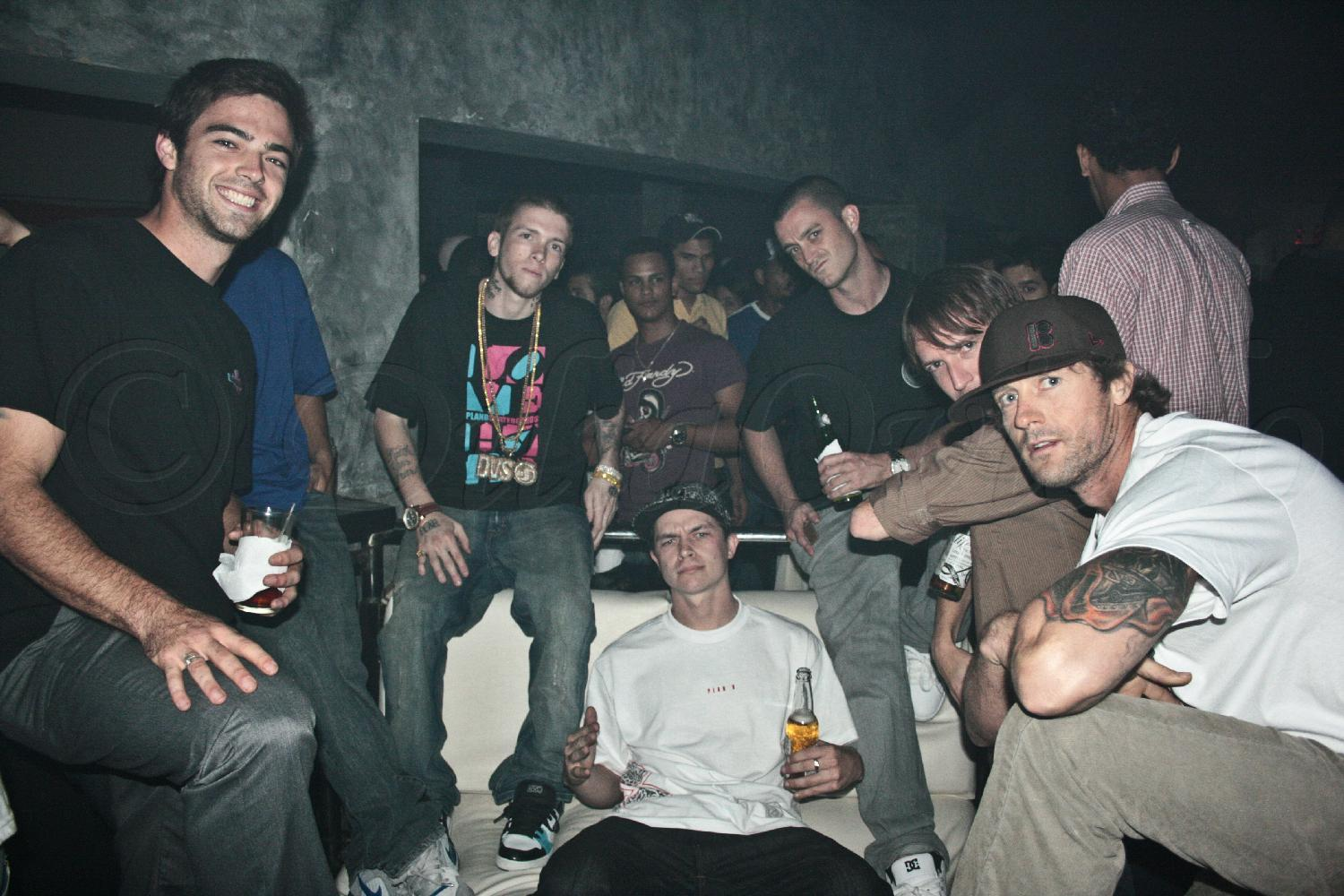
Way (far right foreground) with other skaters in 2007

Around 2005, rumors emerged in regard to a plan, devised by Way and McKay, to relaunch Plan B. In 2005, with the financial backing of Syndrome Distribution, Way and McKay reformed Plan B Skateboards, maintaining their roles as company co-owners, as well as professional skaters.

=== Sponsorship ===
As of 2023 Way is sponsored by Pacific Drive, Plan B skateboards (he is the co-owner with McKay), MegaRamp, Titan Skateboard Tools, Element 115 Botanicals, and ASEC.

Way's former sponsors include: DC Shoes, Independent Truck Company, Nixon, and Capix. Way's brother Damon Way co-founded the DC Shoes company with Ken Block.

=== Awards and achievements ===
- 1986: Winner of the first contest he entered at eleven years of age
- 1989: Winner of the first vert contest he entered in Michigan, United States
- 1991: Thrasher magazine "Skater of the Year"
- 1997: World record for "Biggest Air" – 12 feet (3.7 m) kickflip
- 1997: First skateboarder to drop into a ramp from a helicopter
- 2002: World record for "Long Distance Jump" – 65 feet (20 m)
- 2002: World record for "Biggest Air" – 18 feet (5.5 m) 3 inches (7.6 cm) above the top of a ramp (this record was subsequently broken)
- 2003: Second world record for "Long Distance Jump" on June 19 at the Point X Camp mega ramp – surpassed his own previous record with a distance of 75 feet (23 m)
- 2003: Second world record for "Biggest Air" – surpassed his own previous record with a distance of 23.5 feet (7.2 m) above the top of a ramp
- 2004: Gold medal at X Games
- 2004: Third world record for "Long Distance Jump" on June 19 at X Games – surpassed his own previous record with a distance of 79 feet (24 m)
- 2004: Second Thrasher "Skater of the Year" award
- 2005: First skateboarder to jump over the Great Wall of China on a skateboard (Way performed this jump with a broken foot after failing a practice jump the day before.)
- 2005: "Big Air" Gold medal at X Games XI
- 2006: "Big Air" Gold medal at X Games XII
- 2006: First skateboarder to perform the "El Camino" ("rocket grab" backflip) skateboard trick on a mega ramp – Mexico City, Mexico
- 2006: First skateboarder to drop into a ramp from the top of the guitar sculpture at the Hard Rock Cafe & Casino in Las Vegas, United States – a height of 82 feet (25 m)
- 2009: World record for land speed on a skateboard – assisted by professional skateboarder and entrepreneur Rob Dyrdek
- 2009: Winner of the inaugural "Big Air Rail Jam" event at X Games XV – Staples Center, Los Angeles, United States

== Waiting for Lightning ==
In early 2012, a documentary on Way's life, produced and directed by Jacob Rosenberg, was released by Samuel Goldwyn Films. Entitled Waiting for Lightning, the film focuses on the details of the first four decades of Way's life, including his childhood, the development that led to his career as a professional skateboarder, and a major project that was being constructed in China around the same time period that the documentary was being filmed.

Way embarked on a tour in support of the documentary that included presentations in Canada and Australia. While Way was in Australia to promote the film, Australian skateboard photographer Steve Gourlay created a portrait of Way standing at Federation Square in Melbourne, Australia. Way was also photographed at the Melbourne premiere with Australian vert skateboarders Dom Kekich and Tas Pappas.

== Music ==
Way has been involved in numerous musical projects, such as "Escalera", a band formed with fellow professional skateboarder Bob Burnquist. Way revealed in the 2013 Jenkem interview that he had most recently collaborated with hip hop artists such as Mod Sun and Stevie J, explaining that he gravitates towards electronic and hip hop music producers. Way stated that his most recent collaborations have been "a good influence" in an educational sense, as his previous musical experiences have primarily involved guitar and "organic" instruments. An accompanying photograph for the published interview depicts Way seated in front of his home music studio.

== Filmography ==
- The Reality of Bob Burnquist (2005)
- The Man Who Souled the World (2007)
- ‘’X Games: The Movie’’ (2009)
- Waiting For Lightning (2012)

== Video game appearances ==
Way is a playable character in every installment of Electronic Arts' Skate series. In Skate, Skate It, and Skate 3, he owns a fictional mega-skating park. He is also playable in the Konami video game Evolution Skateboarding as well as MTV Sports: Skateboarding Featuring Andy Macdonald.

== Racing record ==
=== Complete FIA World Rallycross Championship results ===
==== Supercar ====
| Year | Entrant | Car | 1 | 2 | 3 | 4 | 5 | 6 | 7 | 8 | 9 | 10 | 11 | 12 | 13 | Pos | Points |
|---|---|---|---|---|---|---|---|---|---|---|---|---|---|---|---|---|---|
| 2015 | JRM Racing | Mini Countryman | POR | HOC; 19 | BEL | GBR | GER | SWE | CAN | NOR | FRA | BAR | TUR | ITA | ARG | 40th | 0 |
