= Dave Mirra =

American BMX rider (1974–2016)

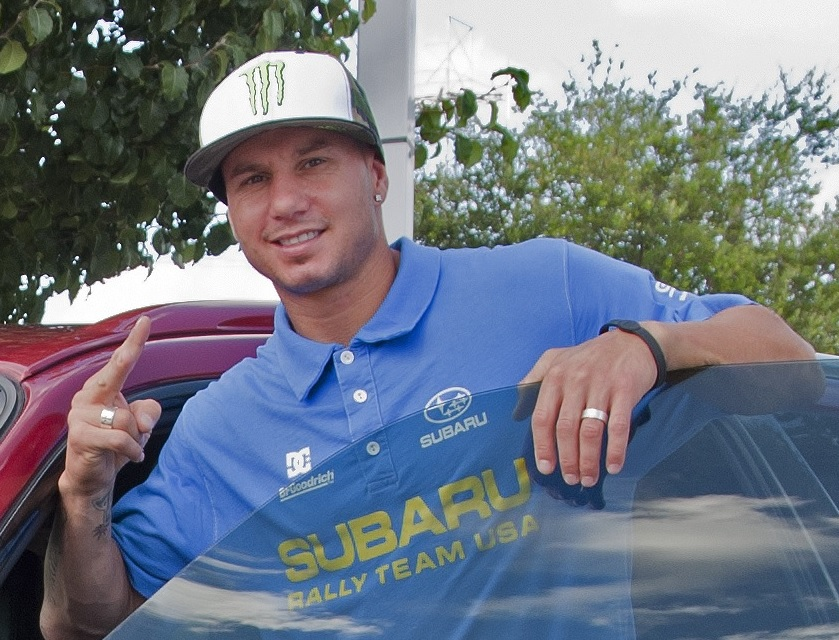
- Mirra in 2010

Personal information
- Full name: David Michael Mirra
- Nicknames: "Miracle Boy", "Miracle Man"
- Born: April 4, 1974 Chittenango, New York, U.S.
- Died: February 4, 2016 (aged 41) Greenville, North Carolina, U.S.
- Occupation: Extreme sports athlete
- Height: 5 ft 9 in (175 cm)
- Weight: 190 lb (86 kg)
- Spouse: Lauren Blackwell Mirra (m. 2006)
- Children: 2

Sport
- Sport: BMX, Rallycross
Medal record
Summer X Games
Representing United States
Gold medal – first place	1996 Newport	BMX Park
Gold medal – first place	1997 San Diego	BMX Park
Gold medal – first place	1997 San Diego	BMX Vert
Gold medal – first place	1998 San Diego	BMX Park
Gold medal – first place	1998 San Diego	BMX Vert
Gold medal – first place	1998 San Diego	BMX Vert Doubles
Gold medal – first place	1999 San Francisco	BMX Park
Gold medal – first place	1999 San Francisco	BMX Vert
Gold medal – first place	2000 San Francisco	BMX Park
Gold medal – first place	2001 Philadelphia	BMX Vert
Gold medal – first place	2002 Philadelphia	BMX Vert
Gold medal – first place	2004 Los Angeles	BMX Park
Gold medal – first place	2004 Los Angeles	BMX Vert
Gold medal – first place	2005 Los Angeles	BMX Park
Silver medal – second place	1995 Newport	BMX Vert
Silver medal – second place	1996 Newport	BMX Vert
Silver medal – second place	2000 San Francisco	BMX Vert
Silver medal – second place	2003 Los Angeles	BMX Vert
Silver medal – second place	2005 Los Angeles	BMX Vert Best Trick
Silver medal – second place	2008 Los Angeles	BMX Big Air
Bronze medal – third place	2003 Los Angeles	BMX Park
Bronze medal – third place	2007 Los Angeles	BMX Park
Bronze medal – third place	2008 Los Angeles	RCR Racing
Bronze medal – third place	2009 Los Angeles	BMX Big Air
Gravity Games
Gold medal – first place	1999 Providence	BMX Park
Gold medal – first place	2000 Providence	BMX Vert
Gold medal – first place	2002 Cleveland	BMX Park
Gold medal – first place	2003 Cleveland	BMX Park
Gold medal – first place	2003 Cleveland	BMX Vert
Silver medal – second place	2002 Cleveland	BMX Vert
- Updated on February 5, 2016

David Michael Mirra (April 4, 1974 – February 4, 2016) was an American BMX rider who also competed in rallycross racing. He set the record for most medals in BMX Freestyle at the X Games (later tied by Scotty Cranmer) and earned at least one BMX medal at the event in all but one year from the competition's inception in 1995 until 2009. He also competed for several years with the Subaru Rally Team USA as a rallycross driver. Mirra rode for and was fully sponsored by Haro Bikes from the mid-1990s until he started his own bike company. He was a member of the team which won the 2014 Race Across America four-person male (under 50) category. Mirra died by suicide on February 4, 2016. He was posthumously inducted into the BMX Hall of Fame on June 11, 2016.

== Early life ==
Mirra was born on April 4, 1974, in Chittenango, New York. He graduated from California State Polytechnic University, Pomona (Cal Poly Pomona).

In the 1990s, Mirra's brother, Tim, moved to Greenville, North Carolina, to attend East Carolina University. Dave moved to Greenville soon after. Fellow professional BMX rider Ryan Nyquist moved in with Tim. Mirra and Nyquist became quick friends and would build and ride ramps together. Greenville is now home to over twenty professional BMX riders. This gave Greenville the nickname "Protown" in the BMX community.

== Career ==
While still living in Chittenango, Mirra joined the Haro Bikes BMX team in 1987, at the age of 13. Video producers Plywood Hoods featured him in their videos in 1988. Mirra gained a sponsorship from Vision Street Wear in 1989. He was also sponsored by GT Bicycles through 1991, and then joined Hoffman Bikes in 1992 before re-signing with Haro in 1994.

Mirra turned professional in 1992. He won at least one medal at the X Games in every year from 1995 through 2009, with the exception of 2006, after being injured during a practice run. In 2005, Mirra won the Best Male Action Sports Athlete ESPY Award. He tied Tony Hawk and Joe Parsons as the fastest to reach 14 X Games medals, and his 24 total medals at the X Games stood as a record until 2013. He shares the record for most gold medals at the Summer X Games, with a total of 14 (tied with Bob Burnquist and Jamie Bestwick). He retired from BMX riding in 2011.

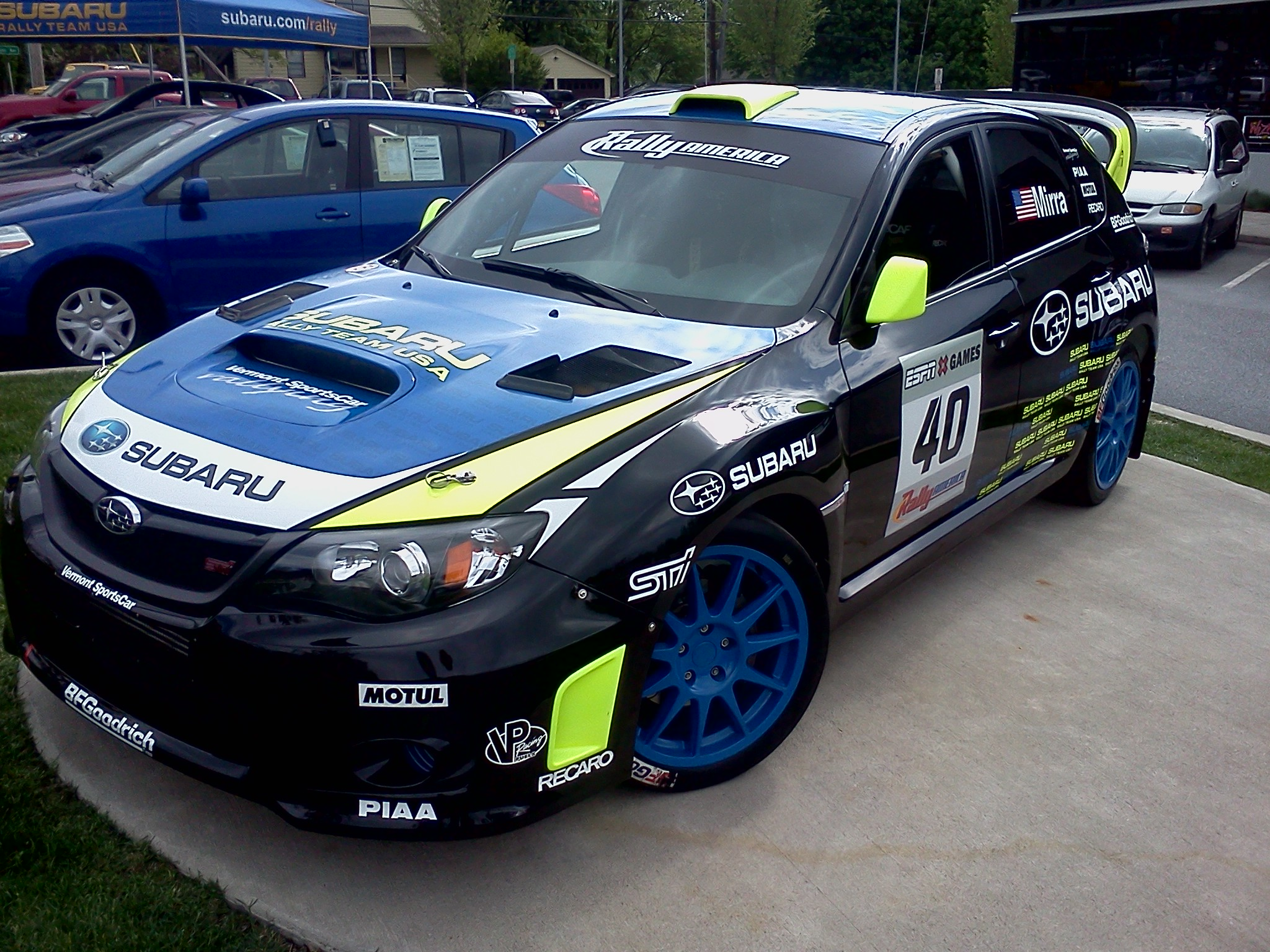
Mirra's Subaru rally car

From 2008 through 2013, Mirra competed in rallying and rallycross as a member of Subaru Rally Team USA. He had a career-best fourth-place finish during the 2013 Global RallyCross Championship. Mirra became interested in Ironman competitions, competing in his first triathlon in March 2013. He qualified for the 2014 Ironman 70.3 World Championship.

Mirra's success took him to numerous outlets besides riding his bike, such as hosting two seasons of MTV's Real World/Road Rules Challenge. He is featured in the Dave Mirra Freestyle BMX video game series and more recently appeared in the 2009 video game Colin McRae: Dirt 2. He published a photo-biography titled Mirra Images, and was once one of People magazine's "50 Hottest Bachelors". In the mid-2000s, Mirra signed an endorsement deal with DC Shoes after leaving Adidas. With his friends in 2007, he started his own bike company called MirraCo.

== Personal life and death ==
Mirra and his wife, Lauren, had two daughters. Mirra contracted bacterial meningitis in 2010. He recovered before resuming rally racing.

On February 4, 2016, Mirra died from a self-inflicted gunshot wound to the head in Greenville, North Carolina at the age of 41. Authorities responded to a reported suicide and discovered his body inside his black Ford F-150 Raptor. He had reportedly been visiting friends in the area. Greenville mayor Allen M. Thomas called Mirra "a great friend and wonderful human being".

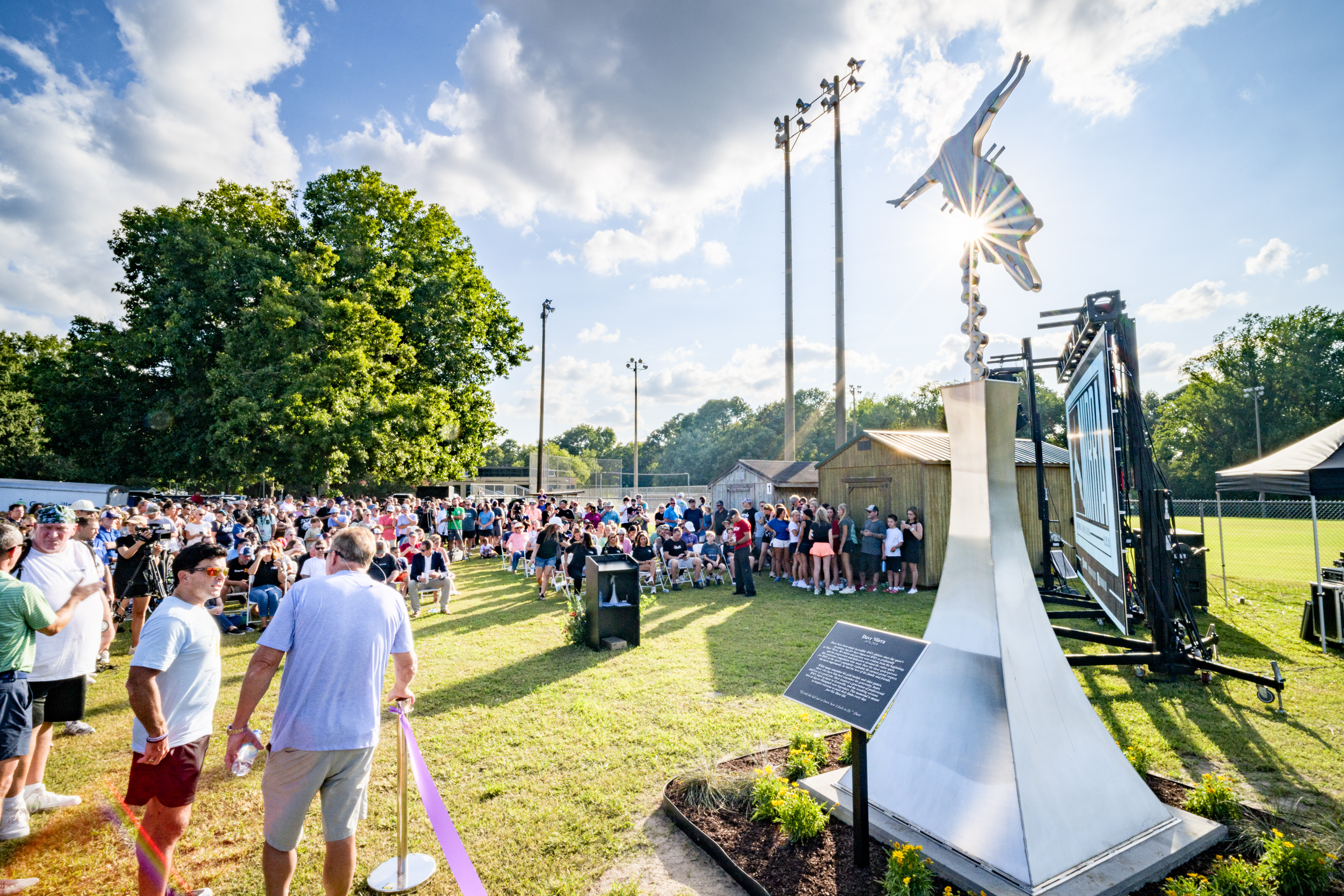
Unveiling of the Dave Mirra Memorial in Greenville

Mirra was posthumously diagnosed with chronic traumatic encephalopathy (CTE). In addition to the "countless" concussions he suffered during his career, his skull was fractured when he was hit by a car at 19 years old, and he also competed in boxing as an amateur. He became the first action sports star to be diagnosed with the neurodegenerative disease.

Mirra's wife chose to support several charitable causes in her husband's memory, including CTE research, Road 2 Recovery Foundation, and More Than Sport.

City officials in Greenville, North Carolina planned to create an action sports park to honor Mirra's legacy. The first phase would include both skate and BMX facilities.

In 2024, Mirra's family dedicated a permanent statue of Dave Mirra at the Jaycee skatepark in Greenville, where Mirra rode BMX when he moved to the area in 1995. The memorial was created by his friends, including BMX rider Mike Laird who did the fabrication.

== X Games competition history ==
GOLD (14) SILVER (6) BRONZE (4)
Year	X Games	Events	Rank	Medal
1995	Extreme Games	BMX Vert	2nd	Silver medal
1996	Summer X Games II	BMX Street	1st	Gold medal
1996	Summer X Games II	BMX Vert	2nd	Silver medal
1997	Summer X Games III	BMX Street	1st	Gold medal
1997	Summer X Games III	BMX Vert	1st	Gold medal
1998	Summer X Games IV	BMX Street	1st	Gold medal
1998	Summer X Games IV	BMX Vert	1st	Gold medal
1998	Summer X Games IV	BMX Vert Doubles	1st	Gold medal
1999	Summer X Games V	BMX Street	1st	Gold medal
1999	Summer X Games V	BMX Vert	1st	Gold medal
2000	Summer X Games VI	BMX Park	1st	Gold medal
2000	Summer X Games VI	BMX Vert	2nd	Silver medal
2001	Summer X Games VII	BMX Park	6th	
2001	Summer X Games VII	BMX Vert	1st	Gold medal
2002	Summer X Games VIII	BMX Park	4th	
2002	Summer X Games VIII	BMX Vert	1st	Gold medal
2003	Summer X Games IX	BMX Park	3rd	Bronze medal
2003	Summer X Games IX	BMX Vert	2nd	Silver medal
2004	Summer X Games X	BMX Park	1st	Gold medal
2004	Summer X Games X	BMX Vert	1st	Gold medal
2005	Summer X Games XI	BMX Vert	7th	
2005	Summer X Games XI	BMX Park	1st	Gold medal
2005	Summer X Games XI	BMX Vert Best Trick	2nd	Silver medal
2007	Summer X Games XIII	BMX Park	3rd	Bronze medal
2008	Summer X Games XIV	BMX Big Air	2nd	Silver medal
2008	Summer X Games XIV	Rally Car Racing	3rd	Bronze medal
2009	Summer X Games XV	BMX Big Air	3rd	Bronze medal
2011	Summer X Games XVII	RallyCross	5th	
2012	Summer X Games XVIII	RallyCross	15th	
2013	X Games Munich 2013	RallyCross	14th	

== Racing record ==
=== Complete FIA World Rallycross Championship results ===
==== Supercar ====
Year	Entrant	Car	1	2	3	4	5	6	7	8	9	10	11	12	13	WRX	Points	Ref
2015	JRM Racing	Mini Countryman	POR	HOC; 17	BEL	GBR	GER	SWE	CAN	NOR	FRA	BAR	TUR	ITA	ARG	40th	0	

=== Complete Global RallyCross Championship results ===
==== Supercar ====
Year	Entrant	Car	1	2	3	4	5	6	7	8	9	GRC	Points	Ref
2011	Subaru Rally Team USA	Subaru Impreza WRX STI	IRW1	IRW2	SEA1; 5	SEA2; 6	PIK1	PIK2	LA1; 6	LA2; 5		8th	57	
2012	Subaru Puma Rallycross Team USA	Subaru Impreza WRX STI	CHA; 9	TEX; 11	LA; 15	LOU; 10	LV; 13	LVC; 6				12th	35	
2013	Subaru Puma Rallycross Team USA	Subaru Impreza WRX STI	BRA	MUN1; 15	MUN2; 14	LOU; 13	BRI; 11	IRW; 15	ATL; 4	CHA; 12	LV; DNS	12th	36	

== Bibliography ==
- Mirra, Dave; Losey, Mark (2003). Mirra Images. ReganBooks. ISBN 978-0-06-098916-3.
