= Christian Edstrom =

Swedish rally co-driver (born 1976)

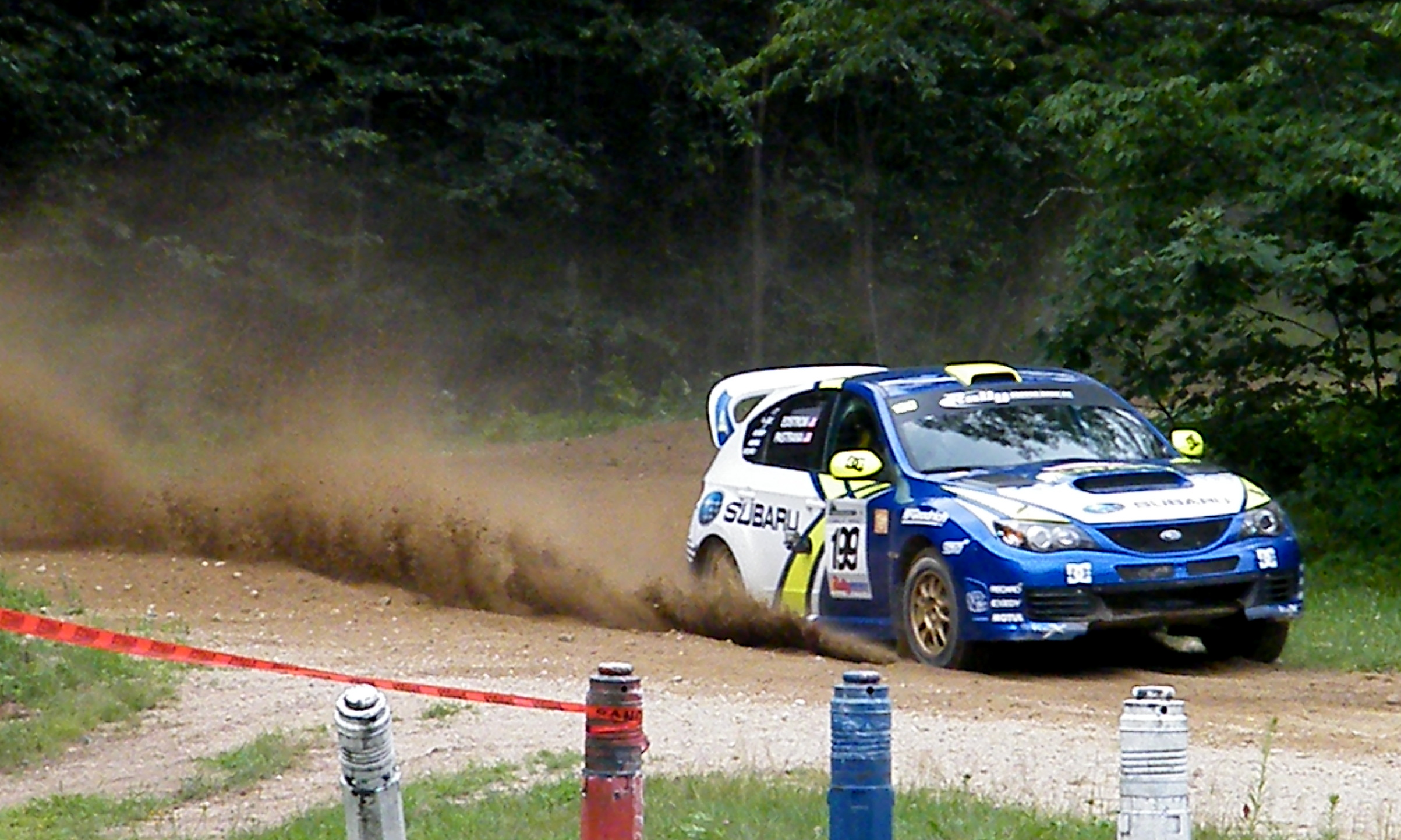
Pastrana / Edstrom at the 2010 New England Forest Rally.

Björn Christian Edström (born March 18, 1976, in Gävle, Sweden) is a Swedish-born American professional rally co-driver. He started competing as a co-driver in 1997, from 2006 to 2016 alongside Travis Pastrana.

== Rally America National Championship Series ==
=== 2006 season ===
2006 was Edstrom's first year with Subaru, and his first full year with driver Travis Pastrana, with the introduction of the new Subaru Rally Team USA. Edstrom and Pastrana became 2006 Rally America National Series Champions. Christian was awarded the Grant Whitaker Cup as the top co-driver in the Rally America Series.

==== Results ====
Event	Location	Position
Sno*Drift	Atlanta, MI	2nd In-class, 2nd Overall
100 Acre Wood	Salem, MO	DNF
Oregon Trail	Portland, OR	2nd In-class, 2nd Overall
Susquehannock Trail	Wellsboro, PA	2nd In-class, 2nd Overall
Maine Forest	Rumford, ME	2nd In-class, 2nd Overall
Ojibwe Forests	Bemidji, MN	1st In-class, 1st Overall
Colorado Cog	Steamboat Springs, CO	1st In-class, 1st Overall
Lake Superior Performance Rally	Houghton, MI	3rd In-class, 3rd Overall
Wild West Rally	Olympia, WA	1st In-class, 1st Overall

=== 2007 season ===
In 2007, Christian ran the full National Championship Series with Subaru Rally Team USA. He was awarded the Grant Whitaker Cup for the second time.

==== Results ====
Event	Location	Position
Sno*Drift	Atlanta, MI	1st In-class, 1st Overall
Rally in the 100 Acre Wood	Salem, MO	2nd In-class, 2nd Overall
Oregon Trail Rally	Portland, OR	DNF
Olympus Rally	Olympia, WA	DNF
Susquehannock Trail	Wellsboro, PA	3rd In-class, 3rd Overall
New England Forest Rally	Newry, ME	1st In-class, 1st Overall
Ojibwe Forests Rally	Bemidji, MN	1st In-class, 1st Overall
Rally Colorado	Steamboat Springs, CO	3rd In-class, 3rd Overall
Lake Superior Performance Rally	Houghton, MI	1st In-class, 1st Overall

=== 2008 season ===
In 2008, Christian took a sabbatical, competing in only one rally.

==== Results ====
Event	Location	Position
Sno*Drift	Atlanta, MI	DNF

=== 2009 season ===
In 2009, Christian returned to Subaru Rally Team USA and ran the full National Championship Series with Travis Pastrana. He won the Grant Whitaker Cup for the third time.

==== Results ====
Event	Location	Position
Sno*Drift	Atlanta, MI	1st In-class, 1st Overall
Rally in the 100 Acre Wood	Salem, MO	DNF
Olympus Rally	Olympia, WA	1st In-class, 1st Overall
Oregon Trail Rally	Portland, OR	1st In-class, 1st Overall
Susquehannock Trail	Wellsboro, PA	2nd In-class, 2nd Overall
New England Forest Rally	Newry, ME	1st In-class, 1st Overall
Ojibwe Forests Rally	Bemidji, MN	1st In-class, 1st Overall
Rally Colorado	Steamboat Springs, CO	DNF
Lake Superior Performance Rally	Houghton, MI	1st In-class, 1st Overall

=== 2010 season ===
In 2010, Christian and Travis Pastrana finished the season third overall.

==== Results ====
Event	Location	Position
Sno*Drift	Atlanta, MI	1st In-class, 1st Overall
Rally in the 100 Acre Wood	Salem, MO	DNF
Olympus Rally	Ocean Shores, WA	1st In-class, 1st Overall
New England Forest Rally	Newry, ME	DNF

=== 2016 season ===
After a six year sabbatical, Edström and Pastrana competed in three events.

==== Results ====
Event	Location	Position
Susquehannock Trail	Wellsboro, PA	DNF
Oregon Trail Rally	Portland, OR	2nd In-class, 2nd Overall
Rally in the 100 Acre Wood	Salem, MO	1st In-class, 1st Overall

== Production World Rally Championship ==
=== 2007 season ===
In addition to efforts in the United States, Edstrom and Pastrana teamed up with driver Takuma Kamada to form Subaru Rally Team International while the team contested the Production World Rally Championship, a series that runs concurrent with the WRC. They competed in the 21º Corona Rally México, Rally Argentina, and Wales Rally GB rounds of the championship.

==== Results ====
Event	Location	Position
21º Corona Rally México	León, Mexico	5th in Group N, 15th overall
Rally Argentina	Córdoba, Argentina	10th in Group N, 22nd overall
Wales Rally GB	Cardiff, Wales, UK	21st in Group N, 39th overall

=== 2008 season ===
Not long after a deer caused terminal damage to Edstrom and Pastrana's Subaru in the Sno*Drift Rally in Atlanta, MI, Edstrom announced a sabbatical to concentrate on his career and family. Former McRae co-driver Derek Ringer teamed with Pastrana for the remainder of the season.
