= Kyle Loza =

American motorcycle racer

- Born: May 15, 1986 (age 39); Trabuco Canyon, California, U.S.
- Occupation: FMX rider
- Known for: X Games Champion
- Height: 6 ft 2 in (1.88 m)
- Spouse: Casey Patridge Loza
- Children: 3

Kyle Loza (born May 15, 1986) is an FMX (Freestyle Motocross) rider residing in Trabuco Canyon, California. He is the founder and member of the group Riders 4 Christ and is a tattoo artist.

He and his wife Casey front an Orange County rock band called "Piranha Fever". Loza has been playing guitar since he was 8 years old as well as drums. He also produces all of their music in their recording studio. Casey plays bass and writes lyrics.

== Riding ==
Loza won back-to-back-to-back gold for Moto X Best Trick in the X Games XIII in 2007 with a move he invented called The Volt, and X Games XIV in 2008, with another of his invented moves – Electric Doom. He was the first person to have won three X Games Moto X Best Trick gold medals in a row. He also won silver at the inaugural X Games Mexico in September 2007. He also won a gold medal at X Games 15 in which the judges went with Loza's Electric Doom to Kiss of Death but some Internet fans thought another competitors "innovation" should have taken gold. He now holds the record for winning three consecutive gold medals for Best Moto X Trick and is the only one in the history of the X Games to achieve this. To win his third gold medal he showed the crowd an improved version of the trick which led him to gold in 2008 on the X Games XIV. The trick is called "Electric Doom". Loza chose to sit out of last Moto X best trick due to a nagging wrist injury.

== Riders 4 Christ ==
Riders 4 Christ are a group of Evangelical Christian freestyle motocross riders. The team is made up of Greg Hartman, Tori Norris, Kenny Bartram, Kyle Loza, Nate Adams, Mike Metzger, Ronnie Faisst, Destin Cantrell, Jimmie McGuire and Bryan Dowdy. Their vision is to push their sport while showing that their faith is a truly important part of their lives.

== Personal life ==
Loza has been married to Casey Patridge, sister of Audrina Patridge, since 2009 and together they have two sons. Loza was also stepfather to Casey’s daughter, Sadie, who died at the age of 15 in February 2023.

== X Games competition history ==
GOLD (3) SILVER (0) BRONZE (0)
YEAR	X GAMES	EVENTS	RANK	MEDAL
2007	Summer X Games XIII	Moto X Best Trick	1st	Gold medal
2008	Summer X Games XIV	Moto X Best Trick	1st	Gold medal
2009	Summer X Games XV	Moto X Best Trick	1st	Gold medal
2012	Summer X Games XVIII	Moto X Best Trick	6th	
