= Big Air =

1999 video game

- Developer: Pitbull Syndicate
- Publisher: Accolade
- Producers: Monte Singman; Chris Downend
- Programmers: Ian Copeland; James Parr; Darren Tunnicliff
- Composer: Peter Hewitson
- Platform: PlayStation
- Release: NA: 17 March 1999; EU: April 1999
- Genre: Snowboarding
- Mode: Single-player

Big Air is a snowboarding video game developed by Pitbull Syndicate and published by Accolade for the PlayStation.

== Reception ==
Reception

Aggregate score
Aggregator	Score
GameRankings	61%

Review scores
Publication	Score
AllGame	2/5
CNET Gamecenter	7/10
Electronic Gaming Monthly	4.75/10
EP Daily	6.5/10
Game Informer	4/10
GamePro	3/5
GameRevolution	C+
GameSpot	5.6/10
IGN	6.5/10
Official U.S. PlayStation Magazine	1.5/5

The game received "mixed" reviews according to the review aggregation website GameRankings.
