= Slam City Jam =

Former North American skateboarding event

- Status: Inactive
- Genre: Skateboarding competition
- Frequency: Annual
- Venue: Pacific Coliseum (Vancouver); Stampede Corral (Calgary)
- Locations: Vancouver, British Columbia, Canada (1994–2005); Calgary, Alberta, Canada (2006)
- Years active: 1994–2006

Slam City Jam, the North American Skateboard Championships, was the longest-running skateboarding event in North America, debuting in Vancouver, Canada, in 1994. The three-day event captured the music and lifestyle of skate culture and featured athletes and musicians. Cash prizes were awarded to both men and women, although the total cash purse for men was significantly larger. The event has appeared as a playable level in the video games Tony Hawk's Underground and Grind Session.

In 2006, Slam City Jam took place in Calgary instead of Vancouver, as the Pacific Coliseum was being renovated for the 2010 Winter Olympics. In Calgary, the event was held in the Stampede Corral. It has not been held since, and there has been no word on reviving it.

== Notable winners ==
- Bob Burnquist (2001)
