= Karen Jonz =

Brazilian skateboarder

Personal information
- Born: Karen Jonz Domingos Santos Claudio; 29 September 1983 (age 42) Santos, Brazil
- Years active: 2000–present
- Height: 163 cm (5 ft 4 in)
- Weight: 57 kg (126 lb; 9 st 0 lb)
- Spouse: Lucas Silveira

Sport
- Sport: Skateboarding
- Event: Vert skateboarding
Medal record
Women Skateboard
Representing Brazil
X Games
Gold medal – first place	Los Angeles 2008	Vertical (women)
Silver medal – second place	Los Angeles 2009	Vertical (women)
Bronze medal – third place	Los Angeles 2006	Vertical (women)
Bronze medal – third place	Los Angeles 2010	Vertical (women)

Karen Jonz Domingos Santos Claudio, known as Karen Jonz (born 29 September 1983), is a Brazilian skateboarder, designer and singer. She won the World Cup Skateboarding four times in the women's vertical class and also won the 2008 X Games women's vert skateboarding competition in Los Angeles.

== Biography ==
Karen was born in Santos in 1985. She moved to Santo André at age 5 and began skating at age 17, an age considered late for skateboarders. In her beginning, she competed in the men's tournaments.

== Achievements ==
X Games

Women's vert

- 2006-3rd place
- 2008-1st place
- 2009-2nd place
- 2010-3rd place

World Cup Skateboarding

Women's vert- won 2006, 2008, 2013 and 2014.

== Personal life ==
Jonz has a bachelor's degree in radio and television production and is also a fashion designer. She has a label named "Monstra Maçã"

Jonz married Lucas Silveira, vocalist for the band Fresno. They have a daughter.
