= Ultimate Parkour Challenge =

Television series

- Genre: Reality; Sports
- Starring: Andy Bell; Travis Wong
- Country of origin: United States
- Original language: English
- No. of seasons: 2
- No. of episodes: 12

Production
- Production location: California
- Camera setup: multiple
- Running time: 30 minutes

Original release
- Network: MTV
- Release: October 22, 2009 – June 11, 2010

Ultimate Parkour Challenge is a miniseries that premiered on October 22, 2009 on MTV featuring the six of the top parkour and freerunning competitors from around the world expressing their styles against each other in a series of themed challenges filmed in California. It was originally aired as a special, but a full miniseries aired in May 2010. The series is hosted by freestyle motocross and parkour enthusiast Andy Bell, and stylish freerunner/martial artist Travis Wong.

== Hosts ==
- Andy Bell: A former "Nitro Circus" FMX (freestyle motocross) rider.
- Travis Wong: A former nationally ranked "forms and weapons" martial arts competitor.

== 2009-2010 Competitors ==
| Competitor | Age | Hometown | Background | Parkour Team | Known For/Style | Achievements |
|---|---|---|---|---|---|---|
| Pip Andersen | 19 | Taunton, England, UK | Parkour trickster | Urban Freeflow | Despite being one of the most skilled and strongest Parkour athletes in the world, he is known best for his sense of humor and clownish antics | *One of 8 featured Athletes in MTV's Ultimate Parkour Challenge, *Finalist in 2008 World Barclaycard Championships, *4th Place, 2007 World Freerunning Championships, *Appeared in a commercial for Swatch watches, Models for clothing and apparel companies |
| Daniel Arroyo | 23 | Tampa, Florida | Freerunner | | | *One of 8 featured Athletes in MTV's Ultimate Parkour Challenge, *Achieved YouTube fame as the inventor of the "Cast Bomb", a very high-risk move |
| King David | 26 | Las Vegas, Nevada | Freerunner | | | *Finalist, MTV's Ultimate Parkour Challenge, *Underground YouTube sensation, *Most respected in the U.S. Parkour community |
| Ryan Doyle | 25 | Liverpool, England, UK | Martial Artist | Freerunner | Explosive corkscrew flips, spins, and other acrobatic moves harvested from a background as a renowned martial arts champion. | *1st Place, 2007 Redbull Art of Motion, the first ever international freerunning competition, *UK Martial Arts Tricking Champion for 4 years running, *Finalist, MTV's Ultimate Parkour Challenge, *Appeared on Late Night with Jimmy Fallon, *Appeared on Discovery Channel's Fight Science, *Appeared on The Ellen DeGeneres Show as Ellen DeGeneres' stunt double |
| Daniel Ilabaca | 22 | Liverpool, England, UK | Freerunner | | | *1st Place in MTV's Ultimate Parkour Challenge, *Raced against a Ferrari on German TV and won, *Appeared in numerous commercials for Toyota, Mercedes, & KSwiss, *One of the most watched freerunners, over 30 million YouTube views to his credit |
| Ben Jenkin | 19 | Blackburn, England, UK | Freerunner | Urban Freeflow | Nickname is "Jenx", a shortened version of his last name. Considered a protégé of fellow freerunner Daniel Ilabaca. Universally considered one of the next Parkour superstars. | *3rd Place, 2008 Barclaycard World Freerunning Championships, *Taught a Parkour workshop at Camp Woodward in summer 2009. |
| Brian Orosco (only in 2009 competition) | 25 | San Francisco, California | Stuntman | Team Tempest | Nickname: "Nosole". His "superman flips" while freerunning a course. | Featured as one of 8 featured Athletes of the 2009 premiere season of MTV's Ultimate Parkour Challenge. *Competed on several episodes of Japan's popular athletic TV series Ninja Warrior competition on G4. |
| Tim Shieff | 21 | Derby, England, UK | Former professional breakdancer | Urban Freeflow | | *1st Place, 2009 Barclaycard World Freerun Championships, *Finalist, MTV's Ultimate Parkour Challenge, *2nd Place, 2008 World Freerunning Championships, *2nd Place, 2009 Red Bull Art of Motion Championships, *Appeared on Late Night with Jimmy Fallon, *Featured in the NY Daily News, *Collected over 3.5 million YouTube views in the last six months |
| Mike Turner | 20 | Santa Barbara, California | Hollywood stuntman | | This all-American, 6'2" former soccer player is famous for his incredible "ups", high jumps, athleticism, and fantastic dexterity. | *One of 8 featured athletes in MTV's Ultimate Parkour Challenge, *Master Instructor of the WFPF/Equinox Fitness Parkour Program, *Appeared on Late Night with Jimmy Fallon |
| Oleg Vorslav | 22 | Daugavpils, Latvia | Internet sensation | | | *Featured dancer and stuntman in Madonna's "Jump" music video, *Also performed with the pop superstar on her globetrotting world tour, *Most viewed parkour video "ever"—his "Russian Climber" had collected over 50 million views |

== Episodes ==
=== Season 2 (2010) ===
| No. overall | No. in season | Title | Challenge location | Winner | Original release date |
|---|---|---|---|---|---|
| 7 | 1 | "Queen Mary" | Long Beach, California | Ben Jenkin | May 6, 2010 |
| 8 | 2 | "Venice" | Venice Beach, California | Mike Turner | May 13, 2010 |
| 9 | 3 | "Melody Ranch" | Hollywood, California | Ryan Doyle | May 20, 2010 |
| 10 | 4 | "Hollyridge Castle" | Hollywood Hills, California | Daniel Ilabaca | May 27, 2010 |
| 11 | 5 | "Urban Jungle-Downtown Pershing Square" | Los Angeles, California | Pip Anderson | June 4, 2010 |
| 12 | 6 | "Westfield Culver City Mall" | Culver City, California | Ben Jenkin | June 11, 2010 |
