= Ryan Williams (BMX rider) =

Australian extreme sports and social media figure

Personal information
- Full name: Ryan Williams
- Nickname: R-Willy
- Nationality: Australian
- Born: 22 June 1994 (age 32) Sunshine Coast, Queensland, Australia
- Home town: Caloundra, Queensland, Australia
- Occupations: Action sports athlete
- Years active: 2012–present
- Employers: Madd Gear (2010–2018); Nitro Circus (2012–present)
- Website: Personal website

YouTube information
- Channel: Ryan Williams
- Years active: 2008–present
- Genres: Action sports; vlog
- Subscribers: 3.1 million
- Views: 984.2 million
- Last updated: 9 March 2025

Sport
- Country: Australia
- Sport: Freestyle bmx, freestyle scooter
- Events: Big air, best trick
Medal record
Men's freestyle bmx
Representing Australia
X Games
Gold medal – first place	2018 Sydney	BMX Big Air
Gold medal – first place	2019 Shanghai	BMX Big Air
Gold medal – first place	2019 Minneapolis	BMX Big Air
Gold medal – first place	2022 Aspen	BMX MegaPark
Gold medal – first place	2023 Chiba	BMX Park Best Trick
Gold medal – first place	2023 California	BMX MegaPark
Gold medal – first place	2023 California	BMX Dirt Best Trick
Gold medal – first place	2024 Ventura	BMX Dirt Best Trick
Gold medal – first place	2025 Osaka	BMX Park Best Trick
Gold medal – first place	2025 Salt Lake City	BMX Dirt
Gold medal – first place	2025 Salt Lake City	BMX Dirt Best Trick
Gold medal – first place	2026 Sacramento	BMX Park Best Trick
Gold medal – first place	2026 Sacramento	BMX Dirt Best Trick
Gold medal – first place	2026 New Orleans	BMX Park Best Trick
Silver medal – second place	2021 Aspen	BMX Best Trick
Silver medal – second place	2023 California	BMX Dirt
Silver medal – second place	2026 Sacramento	BMX Dirt
Bronze medal – third place	2026 New Orleans	BMX Dirt
Nitro World Games
Gold medal – first place	2016 Salt Lake City	BMX Best Trick
Gold medal – first place	2017 Salt Lake City	BMX Best Trick
Gold medal – first place	2022 Brisbane	BMX Best Trick
Men's freestyle scooter
Nitro World Games
Gold medal – first place	2017 Salt Lake City	Scooter Best Trick
Gold medal – first place	2018 Paris	Scooter Best Trick
Silver medal – second place	2022 Brisbane	BMX Best Trick

Ryan Williams (born 22 June 1994), known as R-Willy, is an Australian freestyle scooter and BMX rider. He performs with the Nitro Circus, and has a large online following on YouTube and Instagram.

== Early life ==
Ryan Williams grew up on the Sunshine Coast, Queensland, Australia, the son of a former top-rated female BMX racer. At the age of 7, he saw the 2001 X Games documentary Ultimate X, after which he began rollerblading, and then picked up scootering in 2006 at age 12 at his local skatepark in Caloundra, followed by BMX at age 15.

== Career ==
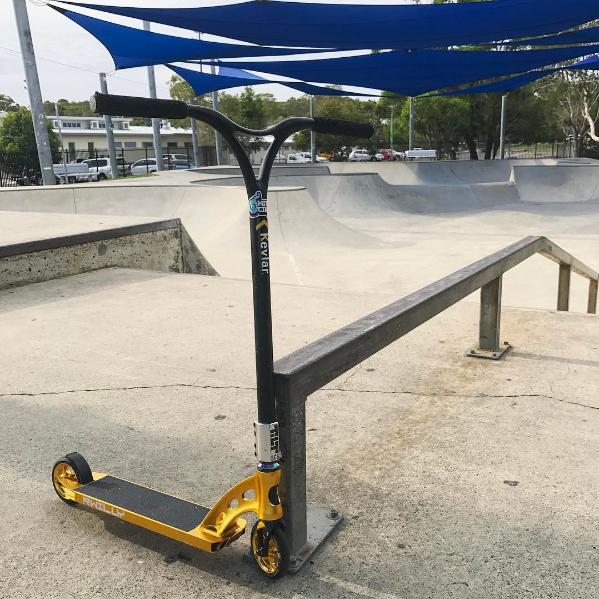
Williams' signature scooter.

In 2012, after a video of his scooter tricks went viral, Williams joined the Nitro Circus team, aged 17 and in his final year of secondary school. He continues to perform with the Nitro Circus, signing a one million dollar three-year contract in 2016.

Prolific in social media and known as a YouTuber, Williams had 356,000 Instagram followers and 757,000 YouTube subscribers by 2017; the latter number had grown to 1.85 million by 2023. Between June 2008 and October 2022, his YouTube channel published 563 videos for a rate of a video every 11 days on average.

In his career, he has achieved a total of 9 gold medals in scooter and BMX events at the Nitro World Games and the X Games and a silver medal in each.

Like most extreme sports athletes, Williams has suffered serious injuries, though perhaps not as severe as many of his peers given the risk involved in the tricks he attempts. He has dislocated both shoulders, broken an ankle and an arm, knocked out teeth, and suffered several skull fractures.

=== World's First Tricks ===
Williams has performed over twelve "world first" maneuvers in both BMX and freestyle scootering.

Tricks first performed by Ryan Williams
Year	Type	Trick	Description/Notes
2012	Scooter	Scooter Loop	Riding out of a loop ramp
2014	Scooter	Free Willy	Rider backflip with nothing front scooter flip
2015	BMX	Front cork 1440˚	3 full rotations combined with an off-axis front twist
2015	BMX	360˚ Double Frontflip	1 full rotation with 2 frontflips
2015	BMX	Nothing Front Bike Flip	Full bike flip with stationary rider
2015	BMX	Triple Frontflip	3 frontflips
2015	Scooter	360˚ Nothing Front Scooter Flip	Rider performs 1 full rotation while scooter separately completes a front flip
2015	Scooter	720˚ Tailwhip to Barspin	2 full rotations with a tailwhip followed by a barspin
2015	Scooter	Triple FSF Frontflip	Frontflip while executing 3 front scooter flips
2016	Scooter	1440˚ Front Flip	4 full rotations with one frontflip
2017	BMX	Triple Tailwhip Frontflip	Three tailwhips during a frontflip
2018	BMX	Front Bike Flip Tuck No-Hander	Full bike flip with stationary rider followed by no hands on the bars
2019	BMX	Double Cork 1440˚	2 off-angle twists with 4 full rotations
2019	BMX	Frontflip Barspin Seat Grab	Frontflip while holding the seat and spinning the bars once
2021	BMX	Special Twist	One-handed rider backflip with stationary bike
2022	BMX	Fakie Backflip	Backflip on a quarter pipe while riding backwards
2022	BMX	Frontflip Windshield Wiper	Frontflip while rotating the bike halfway around the bars, then back without touching
2022	Scooter	Frontflip Nothing FSF to Barspin	Frontflip while throwing the scooter into its own frontflip with a late barspin
2022	Scooter	Cork 1800˚	5 full rotations with a "corkscrew" front flip
2023	BMX	Free Willy	Rider backflip with nothing front bike flip
2024	Scooter	360˚ Triple Backflip	1 full rotation combined with 3 backflips
2024	BMX	Triple Tailwhip Double Backflip	2 backflips with a triple tailwhip
2024	BMX	360˚ Triple Backflip	1 full rotation combined with 3 backflips
2024	BMX	Backflip Quintuple Tailwhip	1 backflip with a quintuple tailwhip
2025	BMX	540˚ Double flair	1 and a half rotations combined with 2 backflips on a quarter pipe

== R-Willy Land ==
In 2019, Williams purchased 40-acres of land in Eudlo near the Sunshine Coast to build a large action sports facility, which he named "R-Willy Land". This facility, the first of its kind in Australia, features a 13-foot mega ramp used by athletes to train for the Nitro Circus tour and other events, having been the host of scooter rider qualifications for the Nitro World Games 2022. Future plans for the property include action sports camps and clinics run as "a mixture of Woodward and Pastranaland." Williams' father lives on and maintains the property, having earned the nickname of "Groundskeeper Willy," and shaped the majority of the run-in to the megaramp as well as caring for the mango orchard that was on-site when the property was purchased.
