= Ethen Roberts =

American mountain biker (born 1992)

Personal information
- Nationality: America
- Born: July 15, 1990 (age 35) Salt Lake City, Utah

Sport
- Sport: Freeride Mountain Bike, Freestyle Motocross, Snow Bike
- Event(s): X Games, Nitro Circus, Nitro World Games, Red Bull Rampage, Crankworx
Medal record
Competition
Bronze medal – third place	2019 Winter X-Games Aspen	Snow Bike Best Trick

Ethen Godrey Roberts (born July 15, 1990), is a professional freeride mountain bike and FMX rider known for his participation with the extreme sports show Nitro Circus. He's the first to land a triple backflip on a mountain bike and has since become a pioneer of big mountain bike tricks, like a tsunami double backflip (2013) and triple backflip (2014). He's a pioneer athlete in the Snow Bike Winter X Games event, eventually winning a bronze medal in the 2019 Snow-Bike Best Trick event. He's also the nephew of the action sports pioneer Gregg Godfrey who is the co-founder of Nitro Circus.

== Personal ==
Ethen grew up in Salt Lake City, he grew up in a location prime for action sports with an active family. His mother was a Professional Gymnast that had a career-ending injury from being on the U.S. Olympic gymnastics team. While his very close uncle is an action sports pioneer. Ethan states his family was "practically born backflipping dirtbikes and snowboards". Also stating “I was introduced to action sports by Gregg Godfrey, as soon as I was basically born,” Ethen says. He started racing motorcycles when he was 3 years old and eventually got into BMX racing too, but the freestyle eventually won him over in the end. “I loved racing, but I loved jumping more.” At age 19, he left for Argentina for two years on a mission for his church, he spent those entire two years away from action sports completely. He didn't ride anything at all, just devoted himself to his mission until he was 21. He was one of the youngest kids to backflip a motorbike, doing so at the age of 14. On January 5, 2020, he and his wife Heather welcomed a boy, York, their second child.

== Career ==
Ethen has adapted several tricks that he did first on a mountain bike that was adapted from FMX, like the scorpion double backflip and the backflip double grab superman. In 2013, he started competing and had his first viral moment with the tsunami double backflip. Over the years he quietly became world-class on a mountain bike, cementing that status in 2014 when he and Gavin landed the first-ever MTB triple backflips. Later in 2014, Roberts landed the first-ever Superman Double Backflip, he was nominated for Outstanding New Limit, ESPN Sport Science Newton Awards for the trick.

In 2017, He was in a Nitro Circus TV produced short-series Off the Grid with his brother and Godfrey clan where they featured various FMX and MTB tricks pushing the limits on the iconic Red Bull Rampage mountain in Virgin, Utah. Where he would later attempt to complete in the event, ultimately not qualifying for the Main Event.

In 2018, he competed in the first inaugural Snow Bike Best Trick event at X-Games Aspen 2018. He has been known for interchanging his style of Mountain Biking and FMX in competition.

In 2019, he was featured in a Giant Bicycles commercial where he attempted to caveman jump out of a helicopter with his mountain bike and continue riding down a mountain. The shorts gained attention throughout social media.

In 2020, Roberts shot several commercials, including one for Zero Motorcycles. He also shot a commercial for Toyota USA later that year.

In January 2022, Roberts and the Diesel Brothers collaborated on Jake Paul’s birthday. Roberts performs some impressive tricks on his Snowbike at the party, as seen on their show.
