= Jayo Archer =

Australian motocross rider (1995–2024)

- Nationality: Australian
- Born: 18 December 1995 Sydney, Australia
- Died: 21 February 2024 (aged 28) Melbourne, Victoria, Australia

Motocross career
- Years active: 2011–2024
- Teams: Powersports Kawasaki; Nitro Circus
- Grands Prix: Nitro World Games 2022; X Games 2023

Jayden "Jayo" Archer (18 December 1995 – 21 February 2024) was an Australian motocross rider.

== Career ==
Archer was born in Sydney on 18 December 1995. From the age of nine, Cam Sinclair was his mentor. In 2011, he secured a sponsorship deal with Powersports Kawasaki at the age of 15, after he had become the youngest person on record to land a motorcycle backflip over 75 ft (23 m). He was a part of Nitro Circus for more than ten years, and first performed in 2012. Archer served as an assistant mechanic for several years with Nitro Circus.

Archer was the first motocross rider to land a triple backflip in the Nitro World Games tournament, in November 2022. He was a medalist at the X Games tournament in 2023 in the Best Trick category. He was one of the three people known to have performed the "triple backflip" trick. His last public appearance as a motocross rider was in June 2023 when he performed a triple backflip at a Nitro Circus Live Show in Jay, Oklahoma.

Archer had been planning to perform a "quadruple backflip" later in 2024. He was also a suspension technician and mechanic for the Raceline Performance and Factory Husqvarna Racing, in Australia.

== Personal life and death ==
Archer proposed to his girlfriend, Beth King, during the Nitro World Games tournament in November 2022 and they were engaged to get married sometime in 2024. Archer died in Melbourne on 21 February 2024, at the age of 28, after a crash during practice.
