= Colby Raha =

Motocross and X Games competitor

Personal information
- Nationality: America
- Born: August 30, 1994 (age 31) Palmdale, California, U.S.

Sport
- Sport: Freestyle Motocross, BMX
- Event(s): X Games, Nitro World Games
Medal record
Competition
Gold medal – first place	X-Games Summer 2023	MTX QuarterPipe High Air
Gold medal – first place	X-Games Summer 2022	MTX QuarterPipe High Air
Gold medal – first place	X-Games Summer 2021	MTX QuarterPipe High Air
Gold medal – first place	World of X-Games 2020	Real Moto
Gold medal – first place	World of X-Games 2019	Real Moto
Gold medal – first place	X-Games Minneapolis 2017	MTX QuarterPipe High Air
Gold medal – first place	Nitro World Games 2018	QuarterPipe
Silver medal – second place	X-Games Summer 2024	MTX QuarterPipe High Air
Silver medal – second place	X Games Minneapolis 2018	MTX QuarterPipe High Air
Silver medal – second place	Nitro World Games 2019	QuarterPipe
Bronze medal – third place	X-Games Minneapolis 2019	MTX Step Up
Bronze medal – third place	X-Games Minneapolis 2019	MTX QuarterPipe High Air
Bronze medal – third place	World of X-Games 2018	Real Moto
Bronze medal – third place	X-Games Minneapolis 2018	MTX Step Up

Colby Raha (born August 30, 1994) is an X Games and motocross competitor. Raha entered X-Games Minneapolis 2017 as a relatively unknown rider but has quickly become one of the most accomplished freestyle riders, racking up several X Games Medals since his debut. Raha is known for his big air, blending his unique BMX background into his FMX tricks, and has gained popularity on social media for performing street stunts with a dirt bike. In the 2020 Real Moto X Games he became the world's first athlete to grind a rail on a full-Sized motorcycle.

Raha grew up in Palmdale, Los Angeles with a background in amateur motocross racing. As a minicycle rider he made the AMA Amateur National Motocross Championship four times, but gave up riding at the age of 14. During this time he dedicated himself to BMX and landed his first support sponsor from Standard Byke Co. At the age of 16, Colby Raha got into a serious car accident running into a telephone pole which almost cost him his life. The accident resulted in a DUI along with serious injuries that temporarily took him out of riding. Two years later, Raha worked a construction job to pay for a new motorcycle and ride again.

== Competition history ==
As an unknown he claimed gold in walk-off fashion in QuarterPipe High Air at Minneapolis 2017.

Raha received his first gold in 2017 at X-Games Minneapolis 2017 QuarterPipe High Air. In 2018, Raha would win three medals in the X-Games which included a silver in QuarterPipe High Air, and two bronze medals; one in Step Up and the other in Real Moto. In 2018, Raha would also win the inaugural quarterpipe event for Nitro World Games. The following year he would go on to win his first Real Moto competition. In 2020, Raha won back to back Real Moto Gold's his clip went viral with over 1.5 million views to date, along with winning a moment of the year from X-Games for the first recorded rail grind on a dirt bike. He has received a total of nine X Games medals.
