= Nitro World Games =

Extreme sports event

- Sport: Extreme sports
- Founded: 2016
- Founder: Michael Porra; Travis Pastrana
- Folded: 2022
- Owner: Nitro Circus
- Venue: Utah Motorsports Campus
- Related competitions: Nitro Rallycross
- Website: www.nitroworldgames.com

The Nitro World Games was an annual extreme sports event organized by Nitro Circus. The event was originally held in 2016 at Rice–Eccles Stadium, and moved to the Utah Motorsports Campus in 2018. In 2020 the event was scheduled to be held at the Principality Stadium in Cardiff, Wales. However, it was canceled because of the COVID-19 pandemic. In 2022 the Nitro World Games was held at Suncorp Stadium (now known as Lang Stadium) in Brisbane, Queensland Australia, and has not been held since.

== History ==
In December 2015, Nitro Circus CEO Michael Porra and Travis Pastrana announced the creation of the Nitro World Games, with the inaugural Games scheduled for summer 2016 at Rice–Eccles Stadium in Salt Lake City. The city was selected for its history with the 2002 Winter Olympics and Nitro Circus. The Nitro World Games 2016 were held on July 16 with seven gold medal events.

The 2018 edition was moved to Utah Motorsports Campus in Erda. Rallycross and FMX Quarterpipe were added, with the former competing on a track designed by Pastrana. BMX and skateboarding events were conducted at the CA Training Facility in Vista, California, while scooter competitions were held at Adrenaline Alley in Corby, United Kingdom (ScootFest) and Paris, France (Scooter Best Trick).

The 2020 edition was set to be held at the Principality Stadium in Cardiff, Wales. However, it was canceled because of the COVID-19 pandemic. In 2022 the Nitro World Games was held at Suncorp Stadium (now known as Lang Stadium) in Brisbane, Queensland Australia and was the only time the event was primarily held outside the United States. The Nitro World Games has not been held since the 2022 event.

== Host venues ==
Year	Date	Primary host	Other
2016	July 16	(United States) Rice–Eccles Stadium (Salt Lake City, Utah)	
2017	June 24	(United States) Rice–Eccles Stadium (Salt Lake City, Utah)	
2018	August 10 – December 1	(United States) Utah Motorsports Campus (Erda, Utah)	(United States) CA Training Facility (Vista, California); Paris, France (United Kingdom) Adrenaline Alley (Corby, England)
2019	August 17	(United States) Utah Motorsports Campus (Erda, Utah)	
2022	October 22 – 23	(Australia) Suncorp Stadium (Brisbane, Queensland)	

== Hot Wheels Nitro Junior Games ==
- 2019 in ??
- 2021 in United States, Chino, California

== Results ==
=== Winners ===
BMX

Year	Best Trick	Triple Hit	Park
2016	Ryan Williams (AUS)	Colton Walker (USA)	-
2017	Ryan Williams (AUS)	Colton Walker (USA)	-
2018	-	-	Logan Martin (AUS)
2022	Ryan Williams (AUS)	Daniel Sandoval (USA)	-

Inline skating

Year	Best Trick
2016	Chris Haffey (USA)

Motocross

Year	Best Trick	Freestyle	Quarterpipe
2016	Gregg Duffy (USA)	Levi Sherwood (NZL)	-
2017	Harry Bink (AUS)	Levi Sherwood (NZL)	-
2018	Pat Bowden (AUS)	-	Colby Raha (USA)
2019	Pat Bowden (AUS)	-	Corey Creed (AUS)
2022	Harry Bink (AUS)	Josh Sheehan (AUS)	-

Scooter

Year	Best Trick	Bowl	Park	Street
2016	Capron Funk (USA)	-	-	-
2017	Ryan Williams (AUS)	-	-	-
2018	Ryan Williams (AUS)	Richard Zelinka (CZE)	Dylan Morrison (AUS)	Auguste Pellaud (FRA)
2022	Rhys Rogers (AUS)	-	-	-

Skateboard

Year	Best Trick	Men's Park	Women's Park	Vert
2016	Elliot Sloan (USA)	-	-	-
2017	Elliot Sloan (USA)	-	-	-
2018	-	Alex Sorgente (USA)	Lizzie Armanto (FIN)	Moto Shibata (JPN)
2022	-	-	-	Mitchie Brusco (USA)

Racing

Year	Nitro Rallycross	Flat Track
2018	Timmy Hansen (SWE)	-
2019	Kevin Hansen (SWE)	Andy DiBrino (USA)

=== Medal count by country ===
Rank	Nation	Gold	Silver	Bronze	Total
1	United States (USA)	10	11	14	35
2	Australia (AUS)	10	6	6	22
3	Sweden (SWE)	2	2	1	5
4	New Zealand (NZL)	2	0	0	2
5	Japan (JPN)	1	1	2	4
6	Czech Republic (CZE)	1	1	1	3
6	France (FRA)	1	1	1	3
8	Finland (FIN)	1	0	0	1
9	Estonia (EST)	0	3	0	3
10	Great Britain (GBR)	0	1	3	4
11	Belgium (BEL)	0	1	0	1
11	Chile (CHL)	0	1	0	1
Totals (12 entries)		28	28	28	84
