= Nitro Circus Live =

- Also known as: Nitro Circus Live: World Tour
- Created by: Gregg Godfrey; Jeremy Rawle; Jeff Tremaine; Travis Pastrana; Johnny Knoxville; Trip Taylor
- Starring: Travis Pastrana; Andy Bell; Jolene Van Vugt; Greg Powell; Jim DeChamp; Erik Roner; Tommy Passemante
- Opening theme: "The State of Massachusetts" by Dropkick Murphys
- No. of seasons: 4
- No. of episodes: 32

Production
- Executive producers: Gregg Godfrey; Jeremy Rawle; Jeff Tremaine; Travis Pastrana; Johnny Knoxville; Trip Taylor
- Running time: 22–23 minutes 30 minutes (including commercials)
- Production company: Dickhouse Productions

Original release
- Network: MTV2
- Release: March 27, 2012 – November 19, 2014

Related
- Nitro Circus: The Movie

Nitro Circus Live (also known as Nitro Circus Live: World Tour in seasons 2–4) is a reality television show. It follows Travis Pastrana and the Nitro Circus crew as they perform live on tour around the world.

== Cast ==
Travis Pastrana
Title: "Pro action sports athlete"
Pastrana is the Ringleader of the Nitro Circus Crew, is a pro FMX rider, rallycar driver, and NASCAR driver, and is usually the first to attempt any stunt involving dirt bikes or BMX bikes.
Andy Bell
Title: "Washed-up motorcycle rider"
Former FMX rider. Bell holds a rivalry with Pastrana involving Big Wheel tricycles stemming from the first episode of the series.
Jolene Van Vugt
Title: "Pro motocross racer"
Canadian Female Motocross Champion. She joins Pastrana in many stunts involving dirt bikes. Van Vugt took on more of a cheerleading role in the second season after breaking her arm and can be seen wearing a pink cast throughout the season.
Jim DeChamp
Title: "Pro mountain biker"
Pro mountain bike downhill racer and freestyle rider. He has been friends with Pastrana since childhood. They collaborate on many stunts together on the show. Became the first person to land a front-flip on a motorbike to dirt, as seen in the 7th episode of the first season.
Erik Roner
Title: "Pro skier/base jumper"
Pro extreme skier and base jumper. Roner is usually the first to attempt any stunt involving snow. He died in 2015 caused by a skydiving accident.
Tommy Passemante
Title: "Construction Worker"
Known by his nickname "Street Bike Tommy", given for a failed stunt in which he attempted to jump his Suzuki GSX-R motorcycle into the foam pit but overshot, breaking both his legs. He functions as the comic relief member of the crew, and is commonly employed for stunts that are the most dangerous and require the least amount of talent, known as "zero skill stunts". Although some rumored that Tommy had passed in a failed base jumping accident, he indeed did not and hosted a show with the cast of impractical jokers called The Explosion Show.
Greg Powell
Title: "Travis' cousin"
Pastrana's Cousin. Going by the nickname "Special Greg", Powell is the all-around member of the team, and generally attempts any stunt on the show. He was the first person to land a "Special Flip" on a BMX bike. He was a wide receiver on the University of Maryland football team from 2003–06 and is currently an over-the-wall crewman for Pastrana in NASCAR.

== Episodes ==
=== Season 1 (2012) ===
The first season covers the crew's first ever tour and it begins with dates Down Under.

No. overall	No. in series	Title	Original release date
1	1	"The Tour Begins"	March 27, 2012
The cast and show stunts are worked out in California, then the crew travels to Australia to rehearse for the first show.
2	2	"Showing Off in Sydney"	March 27, 2012
Injuries mount in Sydney and jeopardize the success of the tour and Wheelz lands the first wheel chair backflip. Also, the cast races V-8 Supercars and play rugby on their day off.
3	3	"Travis Does it Again"	April 3, 2012
The tour moves on to Perth for show number six. Travis lands the first ever TP roll (720 flip) and adds it to the show and the dangers of tricycle jumping are explained. Also, the cast plays in the desert with motorcycles and off-road race machines.
4	4	"You Can't Keep a Good Team Down"	April 17, 2012
In this episode, challenges of tour life are examined and the crew does some camel racing before performing in Adelaide. More injuries threaten the show and the cast visits Bilko's house for a BBQ.
5	5	"Pushing the Limits"	April 24, 2012
In this episode, the cast performs their final Australian show in Melbourne at Rod Laver Arena. Travis attempts a motorcycle double back flip for the first time in four years and the whole crew pushes the limits.
6	6	"Hello New Zealand"	May 1, 2012
In this episode, the crew faces the challenges of performing in outdoor stadiums, new cast members join the show, and they perform in Auckland for the first time. The crew does promotional work and races jet boats on their day off.
7	7	"Nitro Makes History"	May 8, 2012
The crew travels to Wellington and the tour grind wears on the cast but they continue to push the limits. Wheelz lands the first front flip in a wheel chair. Day off activities include visiting Palm Beach and sky diving.
8	8	"Time Flies"	May 16, 2012
The cast finishes their tour of New Zealand in Christchurch in front of the biggest crowd yet. New tricks are landed for the first time, Gregg Godfrey adds family members to the show, and everyone reflects on the tour's success. The crew rafts on their day off.

=== Season 2 (2013) ===
The second season covers the first European tour.

No. overall	No. in series	Title	Original release date
9	1	"We Finally Made It"	April 9, 2013
Four riders end up in the hospital as Travis Pastrana and the Nitro Crew head to Sweden to kick off their European tour.
10	2	"Sweden & Hamburg: Chilling Out"	April 16, 2013
After such a hectic start to the tour, the cast take a few days off to indulge in all things arctic. From a bar and hotel made out of ice, to racing reindeer and dog sleds, to the first annual Nitro Circus Ice Sculpting Competition the crew take some time to "Chill Out" in Sweden.
11	3	"Berlin & Dusseldorf"	April 23, 2013
Travis Pastrana and the Nitro Crew face their toughest challenge yet, 3 shows in 3 nights in front of sold out crowds in Germany.
12	4	"Vienna: Red Bull Wings and Things"	April 30, 2013
Travis Pastrana and the Nitro Crew are broken but not beat as they head to Austria, home of Red Bull and one of the most action sports crazy countries in the world.
13	5	"Just a Couple of Tourists"	May 7, 2013
Midway through their European tour, Travis Pastrana and the Nitro Crew go sightseeing in Prague, hit the go kart track, and pull off their best show in history for a sold-out crowd in Belgium.
14	6	"The Big One"	May 14, 2013
Travis Pastrana and the Nitro Crew head to the Netherlands to perform in front of a massive crowd of 27,000, their largest show ever. But first, they hold an eating competition that leaves one of them bleeding.
15	7	"London Calling"	May 21, 2013
Travis Pastrana and the Nitro crew head to London for a tension-filled show with the future of the tour at stake. But the injury bug strikes once again, leaving producers to scramble mid-show to rewrite the second half.
16	8	"The End of the Road"	May 28, 2013
As Travis Pastrana and the Nitro Crew wrap up their first ever European tour with 2 shows in England, the tour's most inspirational performer suffers a serious injury, leaving unsung heroes to step up in his absence.

=== Season 3 (2013–14) ===
The first two episodes covers moments from the first two seasons. Except for "Pastranaland", Season 3's episodes cover the crew's Asia tour as well as a couple stops in New Zealand.

No. overall	No. in series	Title	Original release date
17	1	"Epic Fails"	November 26, 2013
Countdown of the top 10 "epic fails".
18	2	"Epic Wins"	November 26, 2013
Travis and the crew count down the top 10 moments in the show and on tour.
19	3	"Hong Kong"	December 3, 2013
Dragon Boat racing; Kung Fu; handling king cobras; a typhoon hits as the guys are about to board a ferry
20	4	"Macau"	December 3, 2013
The crew arrives on Macau, and is surrounded by distractions in the world's largest hotel.
21	5	"New Zealand"	December 10, 2013
The crew does a few shows in New Zealand.
22	6	"Pastranaland"	December 17, 2013
Travis hosts an event in the middle of the world tour.
23	7	"Moscow"	January 7, 2014
The cast must do something that the production team promised would not happen again; Russia.
24	8	"St. Petersburg"	January 7, 2014
The guys take on Chess Boxing, search for love and try local cuisine.

=== Season 4 (2014) ===
The fourth season will coved the crew's first ever North American tour along in addition to several stops in Europe.

No. overall	No. in series	Title	Original release date
25	1	"Boston; New York"	October 8, 2014
The tour performs for a crowd in the United States for the first time ever.
26	2	"Philadelphia; Pastranaland"	October 8, 2014
While in Philadelphia, Crum and Sheeny receive boxing lessons and remake the iconic scene from Rocky
27	3	"Canada; Detroit"	October 15, 2014
The Circus travels to Canada for the first time ever. Jolene performs for her audience in Ontario.
28	4	"Cleveland; Salt Lake City"	October 22, 2014
Travis suffers a surious injury during the tour's stop in Cleveland.
29	5	"Las Vegas; California; Arizona"	October 29, 2014
The crew hits the West Coast. "Streetbike" Tommy strips down for the "Thunder Down Under."
30	6	"Scandinavia"	November 5, 2014
The tour arrives in Scandinavia, immersing themselves in Nordic culture. Extreme sports not found in the U.S..
31	7	"England"	November 12, 2014
The tour invades Britain and performs six shows in six nights.
32	8	"Scotland; Amsterdam"	November 19, 2014
A surprise performance from Danny MacAskill, the Scottish mountain biker.
