= The Nine Club =

Skateboarding-themed podcast

The Nine Club or The Nine Club with Chris Roberts is a skateboarding podcast started in 2016 by professional skateboarder Chris Roberts and Roger Bagley. The show is hosted by Roberts, Jeron Wilson and Kelly Hart.

Notable guests include (in order of appearance): Paul Rodriguez, Nora Vasconcellos, Andrew Reynolds, Jamie Thomas, Bam Margera, Christian Hosoi, Nyjah Huston, Tony Hawk, Riley Hawk, Geoff Rowley, Leticia Bufoni, Steve Caballero, Shane O'Neill, Chad Muska, Bob Burnquist, Lizzie Armanto, Axel Cruysberghs, Steve-O, Rick Kosick, Wee Man, Mark Suciu, Jason Lee, Ryan Sheckler, Bucky Lasek, Dave England, Alex Sorgente, Nicole Hause and Josh Kalis.

== History ==
In 2016, Chris Roberts started The Nine Club, an interview program hosted by Roberts, Roger Bagley, and Kelly Hart. The show, which has over two-hundred episodes and reached its one-year anniversary in June 2017, has interviewed accomplished personalities in professional skateboarding, including Steve Caballero, Lance Mountain, Chad Muska, Bam Margera, Andrew Reynolds, Tony Hawk, Mike Carroll, Marc Johnson, and Paul Rodriguez.

The program has the tagline "the show that has skaters talking." Guests often provide humorous and historically insightful stories and anecdotes about skateboarding culture and history through their own unique experiences and perspectives. Guests have commented on the show's intellectual and historiographic merits, highlighting the program's value as an oral history archive of skateboarding, and compare it to programs such as the Smithsonian's Innoskate program.

=== Notable guests ===
The Nine Club featured rapper Lil Wayne, who is a recreational skateboarder, in late 2016, garnering over 350,000 views. The entertainer's appearance on The Nine Club circulated across a variety of major music and television outlets, including MTV News, Billboard Magazine and BET. Previously, Ben Harper appeared in episode #16. Actor Austin Amelio, best known for his role as Dwight on The Walking Dead, was a guest on episode #45.

Actor and former professional skateboarder Bam Margera was featured on episode #70. His comments about being sexually assaulted that appeared on the show were broadcast across specialty media platforms such as High Snobiety and The Daily Dot.

Filmmaker, actor, and director Spike Jonze was also featured in episode #78.

=== Set and symbolic gifts ===
Guests have provided symbolic gifts for the set. For example, in episode #36 Marc Johnson provided the set with a digital picture frame that plays Roberts' world-famous switch kickflip, switch manual at the West LA Courthouse, looping the trick on repeat. In episode #43, Erik Bragg provided the hosts with a vintage styled The Nine Club neon sign. Both artifacts are prominently displayed on set and are visible throughout subsequent episodes. Brian Wenning also provided Kelly Hart with one of his original Habitat pro model decks on episode #53.
