= TVY =

TVY or tvy could refer to:

- Theatre for Early Years (aka Theatre for the Very Young), a term for theatre designed for preschoolers
- Dawei Airport, an airport near Dawei, Myanmar, by IATA code
- Tooele Valley Airport, an airport in Erda, Utah, U.S., by FAA code
- Bidau Creole Portuguese, a creole language formerly spoken in East Timor, by ISO 639 code
