= Jeron Wilson =

American skateboarder (born 1977)

- Born: February 1, 1977 (age 49)

Jeron Wilson (born February 1, 1977) is an American professional skateboarder.

== Early life ==
Wilson was born and raised in San Fernando Valley, California. Wilson started skating around the age of nine when he was introduced to the sport by his cousin. Jeron Wilson grew up skating with many skaters but the most notable are Weston Correa and Ethan Fowler. At that time, the trio skated for Blue Alliance Skate Shop in Chatsworth California. Although Blue Alliance was a small shop, it was well known as the team always successfully competed in the Powell Quarter Master tournaments, held at the Powell Peralta Skate Park in Goleta, California. At the young age of 13, Jeron was known in the valley for his skateboarding skills, including his incredible "pop." Wilson displayed incredible control over his skateboard at a young age. He was one of the first skaters to master the switch 360 flip which remained one of his signature tricks throughout his career.

== Professional skateboarding ==
Wilson met professional skateboarder, Salman Agah, who saw his potential and helped Jeron become part of the Real skateboards team. Wilson's talent was also recognized by professional skateboarder, Tim Gavin, and Wilson subsequently became a member of the Blind skateboards team. The Blind Skateboard team was one of the best in the business, including highly talented skaters such as Guy Mariano and Henry Sanchez. Wilson made his debut on the Blind team in a Plan B video part that included a "friends" section that featured the Blind team. Wilson was recruited to skate for Girl Skateboards. With the help of Tim Gavin, Wilson obtained a shoe sponsorship with DVS Shoes.

== Podcast ==
Wilson, along with Chris Roberts and Kelly Hart, host the skateboard podcast The Nine Club.
