= Lizzie Armanto =

American-Finnish professional skateboarder

Elizabeth Armanto
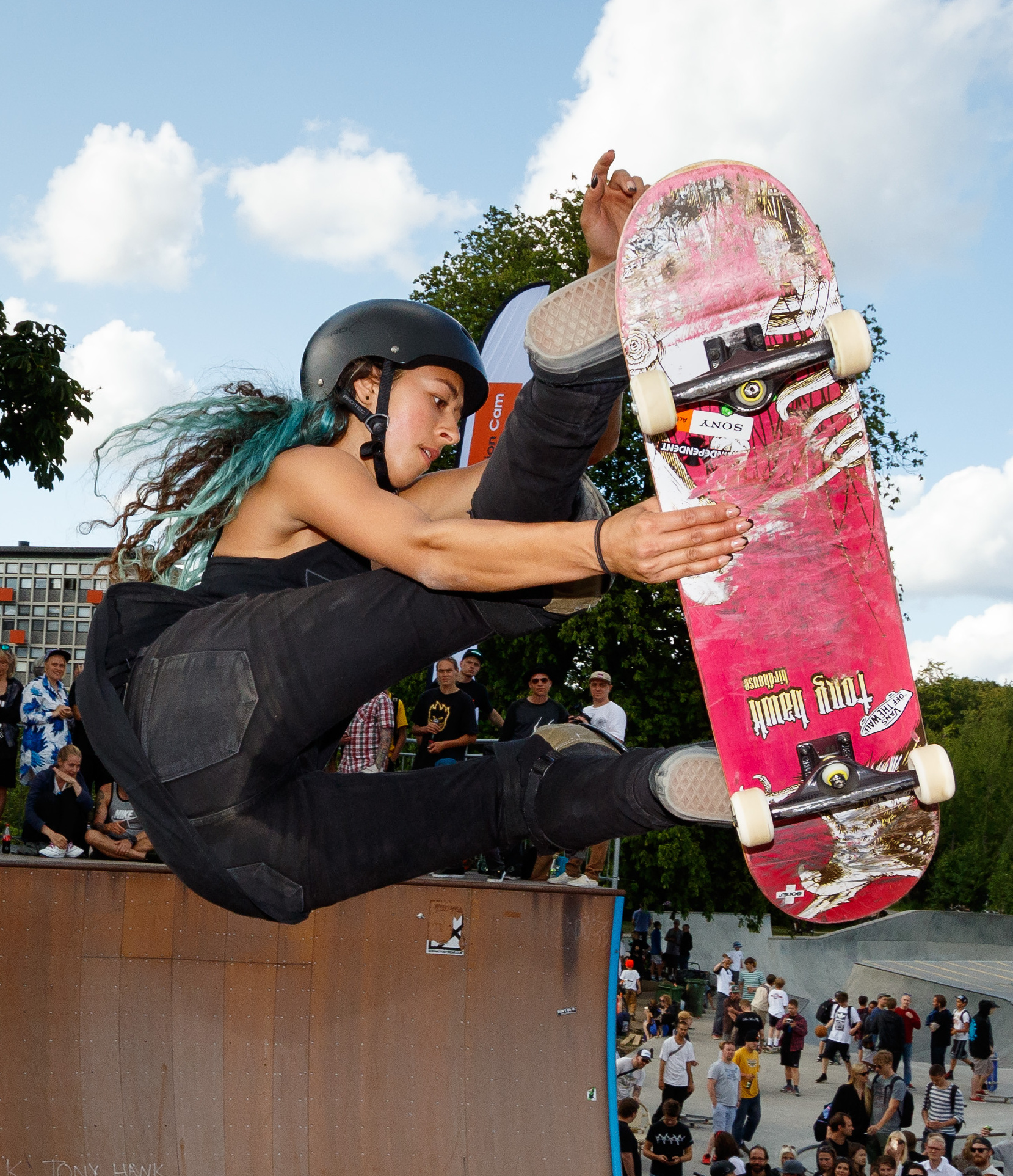
- Armanto in Copenhagen, 2015

Personal information
- Full name: Elizabeth Marika Armanto
- Born: January 26, 1993 (age 33) Ventura County, California, U.S.
- Occupation: Skateboarder
- Years active: 2010–present
- Height: 5 ft 6 in (1.68 m)
- Spouse: Axel Cruysberghs (m. 2020; sep. 2024)
- Website: lizziearmanto.com

Sport
- Country: Finland; United States
- Sport: Skateboarding
- Position: Regular-footed
- Rank: 5th
- Event: Park
- Turned pro: 2017
Medal record
Women's park skateboarding
Representing United States
X Games
Gold medal – first place	2013 Barcelona	Park
Silver medal – second place	2016 Austin	Park
Bronze medal – third place	2019 Minneapolis	Park
Representing Finland
Nitro World Games
Gold medal – first place	2018 Vista

Elizabeth Marika Armanto (born January 26, 1993), known professionally as Lizzie Armanto, is an American-Finnish professional skateboarder. Armanto is part of the Birdhouse skate Team and is also sponsored by Vans with whom she has her own pro-model shoe.

== Early life and career ==
Armanto was born to a Finnish father and an American mother. She holds dual citizenship in the United States and Finland. She is of Filipino descent through her maternal grandfather.

Armanto grew up in Santa Monica, California. She started skating in 2007 with her younger brother and developed a love for skating bowls and vert.

Armanto has won over 30 skateboarding awards. In 2010, 2011 and 2012, she placed first overall in the World Cup of Skateboarding points race. In 2013, Armanto won gold at the first ever Women's Skateboard Park event at X Games in Barcelona, Spain. She won the 2014 Van Doren Invitational in Huntington Beach, California.

In 2018, Armanto became the first female skater to complete The Loop, a 360-degree ramp.

In January 2019, Armanto revealed that she joined the Finnish skateboarding national team and would represent the country at the 2020 Summer Olympics in Tokyo. in 2019 Armanto was guest on episode 168 of the Skateboarding podcast The Nine Club with Chris Roberts. Later in 2019, Armanto earned a Bronze at X Games Minneapolis.

== Personal life ==
Armanto married Belgian skateboarder, Axel Cruysberghs, on October 16, 2020. The couple filed for a separation on September 30, 2024.

== Video game appearances ==
Armanto is a playable character in the video games Tony Hawk's Shred Session, Tony Hawk's Pro Skater 5, Tony Hawk's Pro Skater 1 + 2 remake and Tony Hawk's Pro Skater 3 + 4 remake.

== Sports diplomacy ==
In 2019, Armanto traveled to Denmark as a Sports Envoy for the U.S. State Department's Sports Diplomacy Office.
