= Tim Shieff =

English freerunner

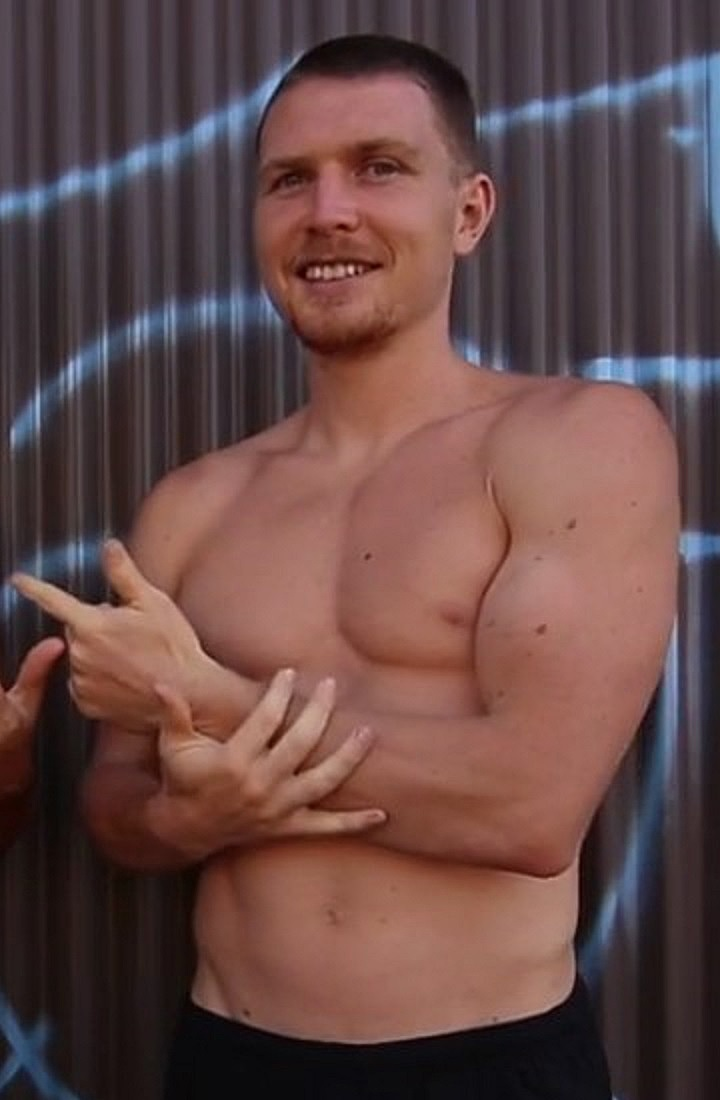
- Shieff in 2017

Timothy Shieff is an English freerunner. He won the Barclaycard World Freerun Championship in 2009 and participated on the television programme MTV's Ultimate Parkour Challenge. He has also competed on American Ninja Warrior and Ninja Warrior UK.

== Career ==
Shieff won the 2009 Barclaycard World Freerun Championship and participated on the television programme MTV's Ultimate Parkour Challenge. In 2013, Shieff filmed himself climbing and running along the Derby skyline. After concerns from the police, he clarified that he practised the moves and the route beforehand.

Shieff took part in the filming of Harry Potter and the Deathly Hallows, in the role of a Death Eater.

== Personal life ==
He had been a vegan since 2012 due to ethical and health reasons. In 2018, while trying to heal some gut problems, he had a meal of salmon and raw eggs, but said it wasn't something he'd do again. As a result, vegan clothing company ETHCS dropped him from their label. In April 2019, Tim appeared on ITV's This Morning, and explained his decision to discontinue veganism for health reasons.

== Health improvement ==
Shieff supports various unconventional methods to improve health. On his YouTube channel, Shieff states that he believes water-fasting with distilled water can relieve the body from the task of digesting food, allows it to focus more energy on healing injuries and diseases. He also shows his support for inclined bed therapy and urine therapy, appearing in October 2018 on YouTube channel London Real where he consumed his own urine, stating that urine "is from you and it’s for you". Shieff also completed a 35-day water fast in July 2018.
