= Dakota Schuetz =

Personal information
- Full name: Dakota Schuetz
- Nickname: Kota
- Born: 19 March 1996 (age 30) California, United States

Dakota Schuetz (born 19 March 1996), also known as Kota, is an American professional freestyle scooter rider. He is the three time world champion in the ISA Scooter Competition (2012, 2013, 2014). In addition to winning several contests, he is one of just two people to have completed all 40 tricks in Tricknology, a website with a list of challenging tricks. Only one trick took him more than one try. He is also the second person to land a documented 1080 on a scooter. The first being Tyler Bonner in 2010

In 2016 Dakota Schuetz held the most wins for freestyle scooter ISA World Championship and was published in the Guinness Book of World Records.

In addition to being world champion he also won the FISE World Series Chengdu in 2018.
