= Nitro World Games 2016 =

Extreme sport competition

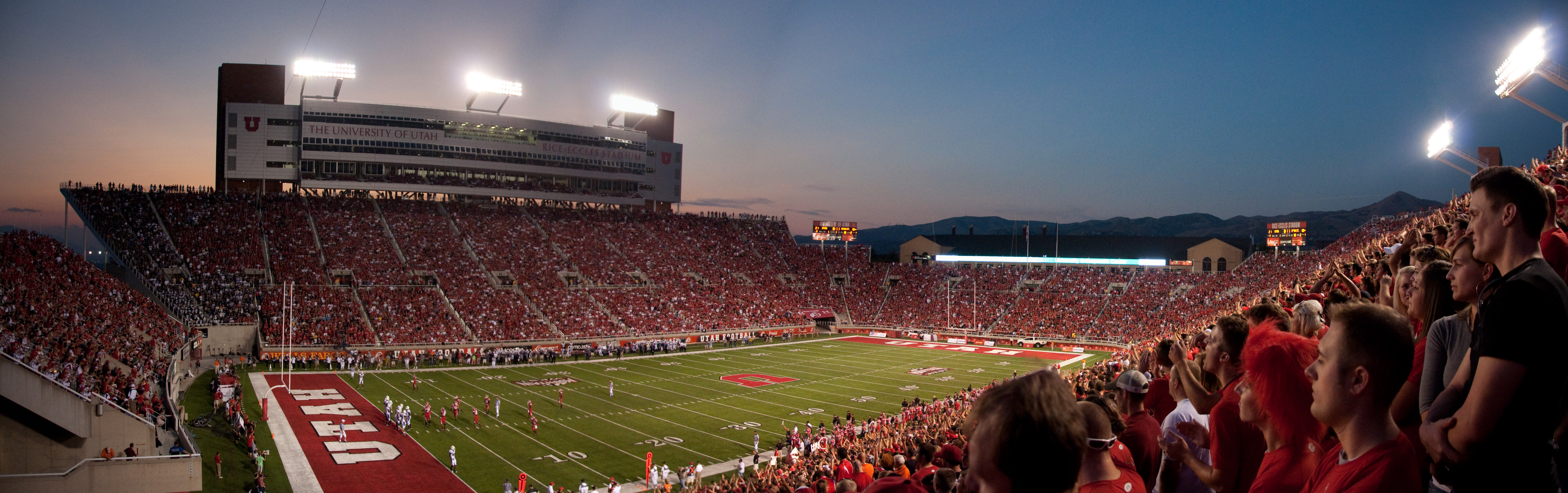
- Venue: Rice–Eccles Stadium
- Location: (United States) Salt Lake City, Utah
- Date: July 16

Nitro World Games 2016 was an action sports competition by Nitro Circus that took place on July 16, 2016, at the Rice-Eccles Stadium in Salt Lake City, Utah. This was the inaugural edition of the Nitro World Games.

The games were broadcast live through social media platforms.

== Results ==
=== Medal count ===
| Rank | Nation | Gold | Silver | Bronze | Total |
|---|---|---|---|---|---|
| 1 | United States (USA)* | 5 | 2 | 4 | 11 |
| 2 | Australia (AUS) | 1 | 3 | 1 | 5 |
| 3 | New Zealand (NZL) | 1 | 0 | 0 | 1 |
| 4 | Great Britain (GBR) | 0 | 1 | 1 | 2 |
| 5 | France (FRA) | 0 | 1 | 0 | 1 |
| 6 | Japan (JPN) | 0 | 0 | 1 | 1 |
| Totals (6 entries) | | 7 | 7 | 7 | 21 |

=== Podium details ===
| Event | Gold | | Silver | | Bronze | |
|---|---|---|---|---|---|---|
| BMX Best Trick | Ryan Williams (AUS) | 27.58 | Kurtis Downs (USA) | 25.21 | Gavin Godfrey (USA) | 25.17 |
| BMX Triple Hit | Colton Walker (USA) | 9.22 | Logan Martin (AUS) | 8.82 | Alex Coleborn (GBR) | 8.70 |
| FMX Best Trick | Gregg Duffy (USA) | 96.60 | Pat Bowden (AUS) | 94.08 | Josh Sheehan (AUS) | 91.45 |
| FMX (Freestyle) | Levi Sherwood (NZL) | 83.87 | Josh Sheehan (AUS) | 82.70 | Taka Higashino (JPN) | 81.85 |
| Inline Best Trick | Chris Haffey (USA) | 15.00 | Roman Abrate (FRA) | 14.60 | Dave Lang (USA) | 14.60 |
| Scooter Best Trick | Capron Funk (USA) | 17.60 | Jordan Clark (GBR) | 17.00 | Corey Funk (USA) | 15.30 |
| Skateboard Best Trick | Elliot Sloan (USA) | 7.35 | Clay Kreiner (USA) | 7.13 | Trey Wood (USA) | 6.98 |
