= Chris Roberts (skateboarder) =

American skateboarder

- Born: August 13, 1977 (age 48); Inglewood, California, U.S.
- Years active: 1996–present
- Notable work: Listen (1998), The Chocolate Tour (1999), Logic Skateboard Media #3 (1999), Land Pirates (2002), Yeah Right! (2003), Hot Chocolate (2004), Transworld Skateboarding's A Time to Shine (2006), Via Marina (2007), Pretty Sweet (2012), and the Switch Flip Switch Manual (2003)

Chris Roberts is an American professional skateboarder and host of the podcast The Nine Club with Chris Roberts.

== Early life ==
Roberts was born in Inglewood, California, on August 13, 1977, and raised in Malibu, California. He grew up skateboarding around Los Angeles County and Southern California.

== Career ==
In 2007, Roberts became a professional skateboarder with Chocolate Skateboards. In 2009, while filming for Crailtap's "Lil Slice of Life" web clip, Roberts' cat, Garvy, figured prominently in the segment. After becoming an inside joke among sponsored Southern California skateboarders, Roberts's cat was featured on a series of skateboard decks and merchandise for a variety of his sponsors' brands.

=== "The Back Forty" project (2014) and its evolution ===
Roberts collaborated with Marc Johnson and Kenny Anderson to launch the "Back Forty" project in mid-2013/early 2014, a creative outlet meant to build and retain quality skateboarding media, industry, and cultural content by and for skateboarders, instead of allowing outside companies unrelated to skate culture capitalizing on skateboarding's popularity and global reach.

Johnson stated in a March 2014 interview that while the project sold products, it was not a company per se. On the Back Forty's Facebook page, the project is self-defined as a commitment to "Becoming the voice for what skateboarding has to say for itself." Johnson further explained: "We have tons of ideas that don't belong anywhere else ... Back Forty's a home for all the ideas that we have that don't really vibe with anything else that we're involved in."

While the project has been largely inactive in recent years, the creative vision which originated with the Back Forty continues in Roberts' Nine Club podcast and web series (see below). Johnson appeared on episode #36 of The Nine Club hosted by Roberts where the two discussed their ideas about skateboarding media and industry opportunities for lifelong skateboarders. While technically unrelated to The Back Forty, the podcast shows a clear vision of furthering the missions of the former project and generating skateboarding culture, history, and business content by and for skateboarders.

=== The Nine Club (2016–present) ===
In 2016, Roberts started The Nine Club with Chris Roberts, an interview program hosted by Roberts, Roger Bagley, and Kelly Hart. The show, which has over two-hundred episodes and reached its five-year anniversary in June 2021, has interviewed some of the most legendary personalities in professional skateboarding, including Steve Caballero, Lance Mountain, Chad Muska, Bam Margera, Andrew Reynolds, Tony Hawk, Mike Carroll, Marc Johnson, and Paul Rodriguez.

The program has the tagline "the show that has skaters talking." Guests often provide humorous and historically insightful stories and anecdotes about skateboarding culture and history through their own unique experiences and perspectives. Guests have commented on the show's intellectual and historiographic merits, highlighting the program's value as an oral history archive and its conceptual relationship to programs such as the Smithsonian's Innoskate program.

The Nine Club with Chris Roberts featured rapper Li'l Wayne, who is a recreational skateboarder, in late 2016, garnering over 350,000 views.

Guests have provided symbolic gifts for the set. For example, in episode #36 Marc Johnson provided the set with a digital picture frame that plays Roberts' world-famous switch kickflip, switch manual at the West LA Courthouse, looping the trick on repeat. In episode #43, Erik Bragg provided the hosts with a vintage styled The Nine Club neon sign. Both artifacts are prominently displayed on set and are visible throughout subsequent episodes. Brian Wenning also provided Kelly Hart with one of his original Habitat pro model decks on episode #53. Chris Robert's still skateboards however he keeps it more to curb skating.

== Video parts ==
- 1998: Tim Dowling's Listen
- 1999: Logic's Issue 03
- 1999: Chocolate Skateboard's The Chocolate Tour
- 2002: Matt Solomon's Land Pirates
- 2003: Girl Skateboard's Yeah Right!
- 2004: Chocolate Skateboard's Hot Chocolate
- 2004: Fuel TV's The Captain & Casey Show (S1 E3)
- 2006: Transworld's Time To Shine
- 2007: Eric Longden's Via Marina
- 2012: Crailtap's Shit Pro Skaters Say
- 2012: Girl & Chocolate Skateboards' Pretty Sweet
- 2016: Biebel's Park – On Blast
- 2017: Chris Roberts Compilation

== Other appearances ==
- 1996: Toy Machine's Welcome to Hell (Friends Section)
- 1997: Transworld's Cinematographer Project
- 1999: Chocolate Tour
- 2002: Arcade Skateboard's Who?
- 2004: Chocolate Skateboard's Se Habla Canuck
- 2005: Adio's Rock Adio
- 2005: Chocolate Skateboards' Hittin Britain/Oui Will Rock You
- 2007: Girl & Chocolate Skateboards' Badass Meets Dumbass
- 2008: Chocolate Skateboards' La Felicita' / Easy Steady Trailer
- 2013: Alli Sport's "Picture This" Chris Roberts' House Tour with Garvey the Cat
- 2013: Alli Sport's Chris Roberts' Skateboard Setup
- 2013: Roger Bagley's Data Recovery
- 2013: Skate Warehouse's Integrity
- 2015: Girl & Chocolate Skateboard's Going Dumb Up The 101
- 2017: Chocolate Chip (with Justin Eldridge)
- 2017: Skate Fillet Episode 100
- 2018: Skate Warehouse's Crailtap HQ Tour with Chris Roberts
- 2018: Transworld's Interests

== Crailtap clips ==
- 2009: Crail Couch with Chris Roberts #1
- 2009: Lil Slice of Life
- 2009: Crail Couch With Jeron Wilson (Dubbed By Chris Roberts)
- 2010:Mini Top 5 with Chris Roberts #1
- 2010: Mini Top 5 with Chris Roberts #2
- 2010: Crail Couch with Chris Roberts #2
- 2010: Crail Couch with Chris Roberts & Justin Eldridge
- 2010: Chunk of Chocolate (Marc's House)
- 2011: Mini Top 5 with Chris Roberts #3
- 2012: We Shred It, You Said It, We Read It
- 2013: Lost & Filmed
- 2013: Chunk of Chocolate (Parallel With Jesus & Roberts)
- 2015: Girl & Chocolate Santa Ana Demo
- 2016: Weakdays: Dugout Ledges
- 2016: Weakdays: Hollenbeck
- 2016: Weakdays: La Crescenta
- 2016: Yeah Right! Log Tape: Nov. 2000
- 2017: Box of Chocolate (with Justin Eldridge)
- 2017: Mini Top 5 with Chris Roberts #4
- 2017: Pro Picks
- 2017: Weakdays: Active

== Interviews ==
- 2004: Crailtap: Chris Roberts Feature
- 2009: Adventure Sports Network: The Tuesday 25 with Chris Roberts
- 2012: X-Games: Shooting The "Stuff" with Chris Roberts
- 2013: Redbull: The Pro Skate Career We Dream About – Chris Roberts
- 2015: Sidewalk Mag: 20 Years of Girl/Chocolate Interviews – Chris Roberts
- 2017: Jenkem Mag: Behind The Scenes of The Nine Club
- 2018: Pod Squad: Interview with Chris Roberts

== Print/web ads ==
Skate advertisements featuring Chris Roberts

- 2001: Welcome to Chocolate Skateboards Ad – Frontside Nosegrind
- 2002: Independent Trucks – Fakie 5-0 Grind
- 2004: Chocolate Skateboards – Hot Chocolate Video Ad
- 2006: Chocolate Skateboards – Fakie 360 Flip, Switch Manual, Switch Frontside Pop Shuvit
- 2007: Chocolate Skateboard Pro Ad – 5-0 Grind 360 Flip
- 2007: Adio Shoes Pro Ad – Nosegrind Nollie Heelflip
- 2008: Chocolate Skateboards – Fakie Frontside Nosegrind, to Switch Frontside Crooked Grind
- 2009: Chocolate Skateboards – 15 Year Anniversary Ad
- 2010: Chocolate Skateboards – Frontside Boardslide Nollie Backside 180 Heelflip
- 2011: Chocolate Skateboards – Altered Portraits Ad

== I'm Glad I'm Not Me ==
I'm Glad I'm Not Me is a series created by Chris Roberts, featuring Chris Roberts. Each episode, Tim Olson (the camera operator) follows Chris around.

- Episode 1: Can Your Cat Shake Hands?
- Episode 2: Your Trucks On Backwards
- Episode 3: What Are you, My Skate Coach?
- Episode 4: Board Hand Flip Trick Thingy
- Episode 5: Undercover at Zumiez BFF (Not Really)

*Not to be confused with vlogs.*

== The Berrics ==
- 2008: Battle at the Berrics 1: Chris Roberts vs. Steve Berra
- 2008: Battle at the Berrics 1: Chris Roberts and the Legion of Doom vs Marc Johnson
- 2008: Trickipedia: Frontside Nosegrind with Chris Roberts
- 2009: Battle at the Berrics 2: Chris Roberts and the Legion of Doom vs Peter Ramondetta
- 2009: First Try Friday with Chris Roberts
- 2009: Text Yo Self with Chris Roberts #1
- 2010: Trickipedia: Frontside 5-0 with Chris Roberts
- 2010: Text Yo Self with Chris Roberts #2
- 2012: Text Yo Self with Chris Roberts #3
- 2012: Trickipedia: Fakie Frontside Nosegrind with Chris Roberts
- 2017: Battle at the Berrics X | Unsanctioned Battle: Chris Roberts and the Legion of Doom vs. Mike Mo's Justice League
- 2018: Battle at the Berrics 11: Chris Roberts vs. Mike Mo
