= Nitro World Games 2019 =

Extreme sport competition

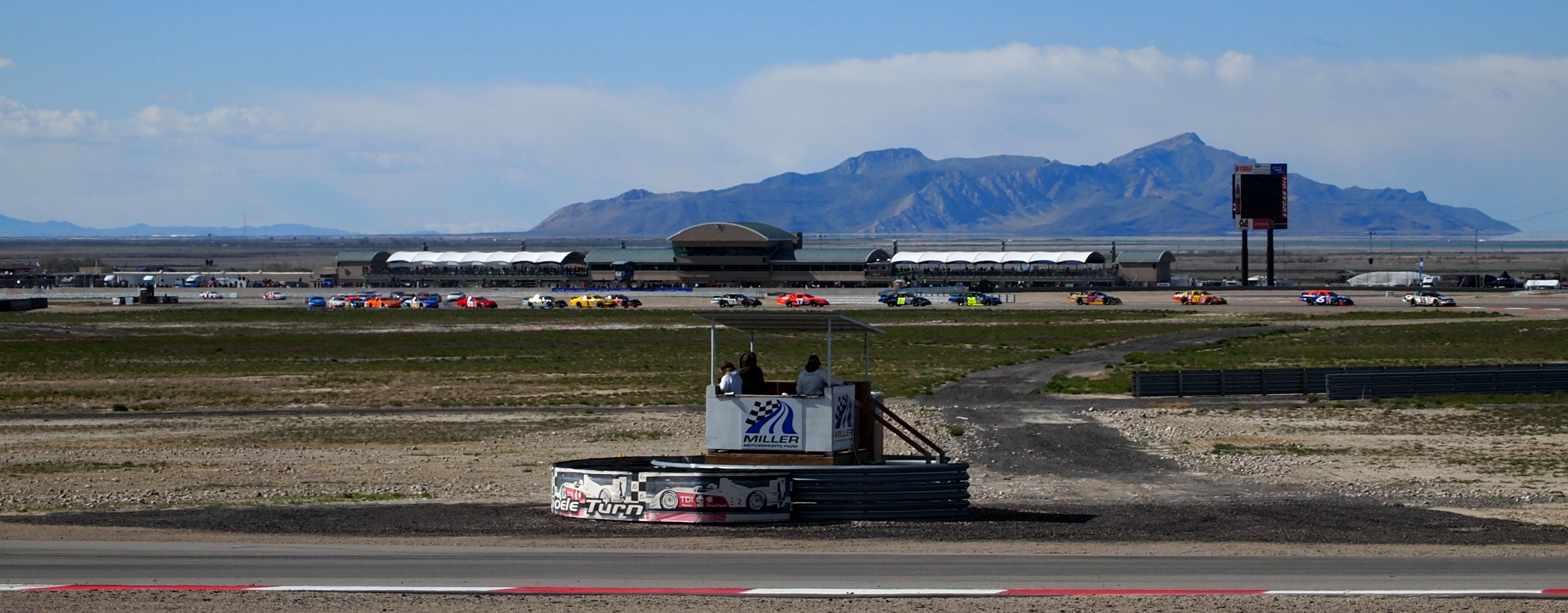
- Venue: Erda, Utah
- Location: (United States) Erda, Utah
- Date: August 17

Nitro World Games 2019 was the fourth edition of an action sports competition by Nitro Circus that took place on August 17, 2019, at Utah Motorsports Campus in Erda, Utah, it was the second to last edition of the event, the last to be held in the United States, and the last edition until the final nitro games in 2022.

The games were broadcast live through social media platforms.

== Results ==
=== Medal count ===
Rank	Nation	Gold	Silver	Bronze	Total
1	Australia (AUS)	2	1	0	3
2	United States (USA)*	1	2	3	6
3	Sweden (SWE)	1	1	1	3
Totals (3 entries)		4	4	4	12

=== Podium details ===
Event	Gold		Silver		Bronze	
FMX Best Trick	Pat Bowden (AUS)	96.00	Josh Sheehan (AUS)	89.00	Davi Johnson (USA)	88.33
Moto Quarterpipe	Corey Creed (AUS)		Javier Villegas (USA)		Tyler Bereman (USA)	
Nitro Rallycross	Kevin Hansen (SWE)	6:04.49	Patrik Sandell (SWE)	6:05.05	Timmy Hansen (SWE)	6:06.84
Flat Track	Andy DiBrino (USA)	3:41.40	Joe Kopp (USA)	3:42.77	Jordan Graham (USA)	3:45.85
