= Axel Cruysberghs =

Belgian professional skateboarder

Personal information
- Born: October 12, 1994 (age 31) Liege, Belgium
- Occupation: Professional skateboarder
- Spouse: Lizzie Armanto (m. 2020; div. 2024)

Sport
- Country: Belgium
- Sport: Skateboarding
- Position: Regular-footed
- Rank: 23rd
- Event: Street

Axel Cruysberghs (born October 12, 1994) is a Belgian professional street skateboarder.

In 2015, Cruysberghs made his debut at the X Games in Austin, Texas. He made his first appearance at the X Games in Minneapolis, Minnesota, in 2018. Cruysberghs represented Belgium in the rescheduled 2020 Summer Olympics, in Tokyo, Japan. He finished 13th in the semifinal round in Tokyo for street skating and did not make the finals.

== Personal life ==
In October 2020, Cruysberghs married Finnish-American professional skateboarder Lizzie Armanto. They divorced in 2024.

He resides in Oceanside, California.
