= Urban Freeflow =

Sports company in UK

Urban Freeflow (often abbreviated to UF) was a United Kingdom-based parkour and freerunning related company that was founded in 2003.

Five Urban Freeflow members left the group after participating in a 2009 corporate-sponsored race that featured only Urban Freeflow runners, effectively ending the organization's business operations.

== History ==
Established in 2003, Urban Freeflow was founded by Paul Corkery (known as Ez), a former boxer who saw an opportunity to connect the international parkour community through an online forum. As the first mover, the company managed to be profitable as the momentum of parkour and its popularity grew.

The corporate structure of the group was compromised in 2005 when Companies House dissolved the trading company for failing to meet their statutory filing obligations. At this time, Ez and former partner Mark Toorock (M2) split and Ez formed a new company, Urban Free Flow. The company sold branded clothes, many of which feature the Urban Freeflow trademarked Glyph logo.

Urban Freeflow was criticized for organizing freerunning competitions sponsored by Barclaycard. The critics believed that freerunning, like parkour, should be a non-competitive activity. There are also complaints of the corporate nature of the event, many freerunning sites saying that the introduction of merchandising and sponsorships would compromise the true nature of the sport. Ez has replied "The people who are saying this are the ones who don't have any sponsorship."

== See also ==
- Jump Britain – a 2005 documentary about freerunning that includes members of Urban Freeflow
