= Freestyle scootering =

Sport discipline

Freestyle scootering (also known as scootering or scooter riding) is an extreme sport that involves using kick scooters to perform freestyle tricks. This is done mainly in skateparks but also in urban environments on obstacles such as stairs, hand rails and curbs. Freestyle scootering gained popularity following the Razor craze in the early 2000s after the invention of the foldable aluminium scooter by Micro Mobility Systems in 1999. Since then the construction of pro scooters have progressed immensely, making it a big business with many brands solely focusing on creating trick scooters worldwide.

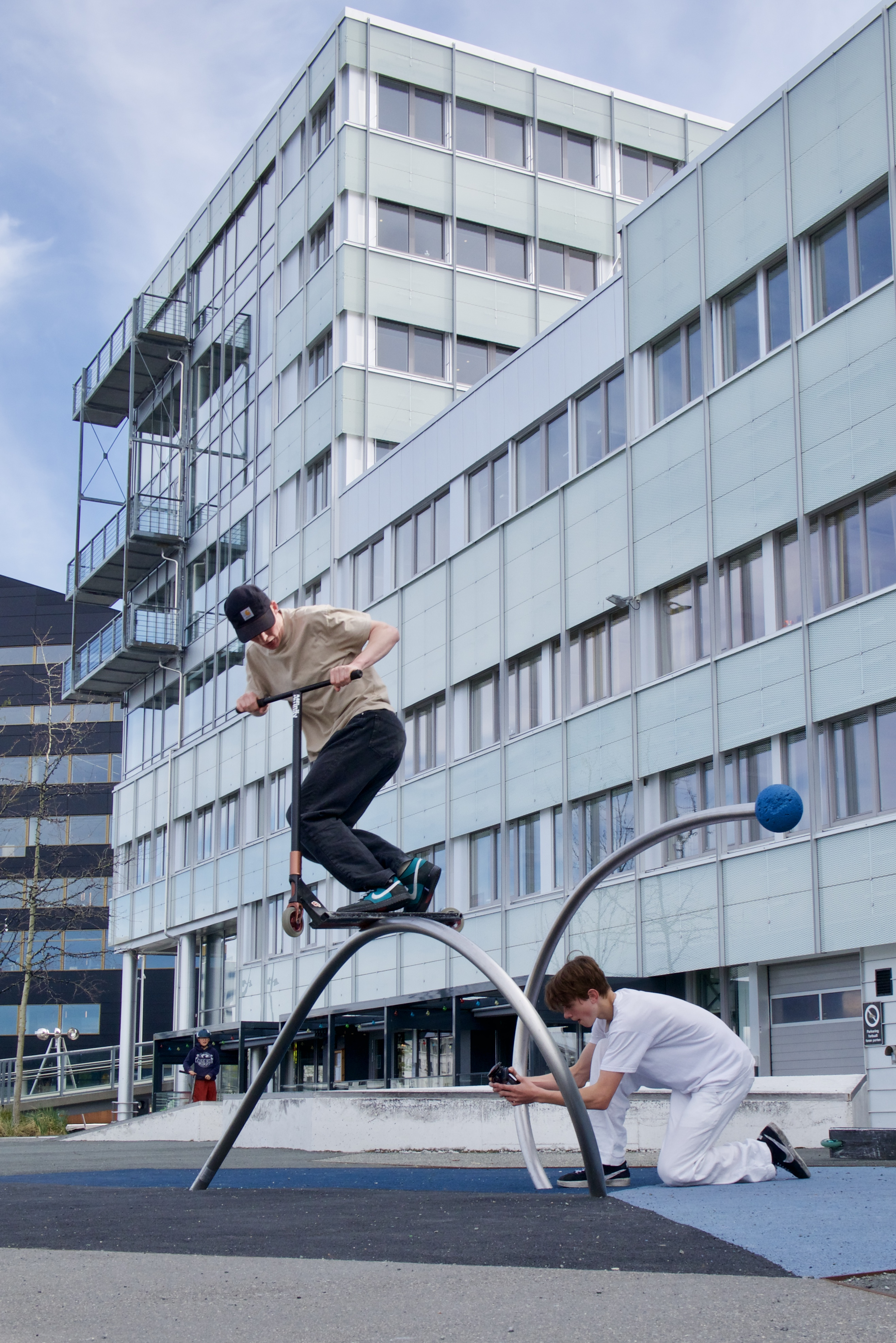
A scooter rider grinding a rainbow rail in the streets of Trondheim, Norway.

== Early years ==
After the first version of the foldable kick scooter, invented by Swiss banker Wim Ouboter (founder of Micro-Mobility Switzerland), hit the market in 1999, scooters became popular amongst childrens worldwide. Micro was the first to produce and sell these scooters. Shortly after, Micro licensed their new invention to JD Sports who would go on to sell the scooter under the name Razor in the United States and under the name JD Bug in parts of Europe. Razor USA alone sold five million scooters in 2000, which was estimated to be around 65% of the market at the time.

The invention of the foldable scooter was made with easy transportation in mind, however, some people with roots in skateboarding and BMX quickly realized the potential of using scooters to perform tricks in skateparks.

Razor Scooters was the first company to form a legitimate team of scooter riders, including some of the best riders from the United States in the early 2000s. This team included riders such as Josh Toy, John Radtke and KC Corning. Videos like Razor Evolution (2000) and the RVM series (Razor Scooters Video Magazine) helped grow the interest in freestyle scootering, as a copy of RVM1 was included in the box with the first Razor A-model scooters. The popularity of the Razor scooter also resulted in the release of the video game Razor Freestyle Scooter, similar to the game Tony Hawk's Pro Skater released a year before. (2000).

Since the sport's inception in 1999, stunt scooters have significantly evolved. As the sport progresses, businesses and systems have been created to support the growth of the scootering community. An example of an early support system is the Scooter Resource (SR) forum founded by Andrew Broussard (also the CEO and founder of proto pro scooters) in 2003, which helped grow the scootering community by connecting people interested in scootering across the world. A similar forum for the French scooter community, Trotirider, was created by Fabian Delos around the same time. As scootering became more popular, there was a demand for stronger aftermarket parts and for scooter shops to carry those parts.

The first ever scooter competition was held in Montreux, Switzerland in 2005.

== Evolution of the professional freestyle scooter ==
A modern freestyle scooter is a lot different to the foldable scooter invented in 1999, both when it comes to looks and performance. For over two decades trick scooters have been evolving to what they are today. The biggest issue in the earlier years of freestyle scootering was the weak construction of the scooters that were available, causing them to break under the stress of freestyle riding. After all, the foldable scooters were created for simpler transportation and not intended for freestyle use, which meant they were light weight and not very heavy duty. The need for more reliable scooter parts eventually lead to the scooter community creating own 'hacks' to make the scooters more durable, such as bolting the folding mechanism, hot glueing the plastic core wheels and inserting an extra metal tube into the fork of the scooter to make it stronger. While these hacks extended the lifetime of the scooters, it was clear that the community was in need of aftermarket parts made specifically for trick scootering.

=== The introduction of the threadless fork ===
The most critical flaw in the construction of the early scooters, strength-wise, was the fork. To make production and assembly cheap, the forks included on the Micro and Razor scooters had threads, allowing for the use of a threaded headset. However, this also meant that (due to the threads) the thickness of the fork-tube was thinner than necessary compared to a threadless bicycle fork. This lead scooter rider and owner of Scooter Resource, Andrew Broussard to create the first threadless scooter fork, named the Scooter Resource fork or just SR fork for short. The SR fork was made from steel and had a much bulkier design than the stock threaded aluminium forks from Razor, significantly increasing durability.

=== One-piece bars ===
The bars included with the first Razor and Micro scooters were created with the intent of being adjustable and portable. This however, also made them quite shaky and unstable when riding. Eventually this problem was solved by welding so-called T-bars that only consisted of a down-tube and a crossbar welded together. There is another type of bar, the Y-bar. this bar has a downtube, to support bars and one crossbar and is y shaped, hence the name. While anyone with access to a welder and steel tubes had the option to make these, the first mass production of one-piece bars were by the companies Wee Scooters, RAD and Scooter Resource.

=== Metal core wheels ===
Plastic core wheels was the standard wheels included with the early foldable scooters. Under the stress of freestyle riding the plastic spokes of these wheels would easily break. To combat this, hot glue was often used to fill the gaps between the spokes to increase the strength. This trick would increase the lifetime of the wheels, although being a tedious task. The introduction of the Micro metal core wheels were therefore a huge upgrade (although much pricier). Soon after, companies like Eagle Sport, Yak and Proto followed with their own variants of metal core wheels, both full-cores and spoked cores. These more modern wheels are often made out of aluminium for weight reduction. This in turn lead to better prices and better access to high quality wheels for the scooter community.

=== One-piece decks ===
After seeing improvements to both forks, bars and wheels, the next big step was to eliminate play in the Razor scooter decks folding mechanism. The first manufacturer to produce a deck with the head tube and neck welded to the deck plate was TSI in 2009. In addition to solving the issue with the folding mechanism, this deck also had an increased strength overall, especially at the dropouts at the very back of the deck where most Razor decks would crack and break after enough use. This deck also introduced a spring-less brake, named the 'Flex Fender', which eliminated the more complicated system of the stock spring brakes used on the Micro and Razor scooters. Shortly after TSI introduced their deck, Phoenix Pro Scooters came with their own version of the one-piece deck. Since then, the scooter deck continued to evolve; going in different directions depending on the preferred terrain of the rider.

=== Compression systems ===
With the introduction of the threadless fork there was a need for a compression system to make it work together with the rest of the scooter. The first iteration andrew Broussard sought out to create a new system that was easier to use. He came up with a large clamp that lets you tighten the fork and bars together by a bolt and top cap into the star nut from the top of the fork tube. This allowed for easier adjustments and increased strength. So much so that he named it the Standard Compression System or SCS for short.

In later years there has been several additions to the list of compression systems, mostly to reduce weight by not utilising a clamp as large as the SCS. These systems include HIC (Hidden Internal Compression), IHC (Internal Hidden Compression) and the Pytel Compression system.

=== Later additions/improvements ===
Other minor (but important) additions and improvements to the design of modern freestyle scooters are:

- Fenders - A "shield" between the deck plate and back wheel, eliminating the need for a flexible brake.
- Different wheel sizes - Wider (30 mm) wheels compared to the standard 24 mm wheels, as well wheels of diameter up to 125 mm compared to the standard 110 mm wheels.
- Larger bearing sizes (12 STD) - Opposed to the standard of using 8 mm axels to hold the scooter wheels, the company Ethic DTC in 2016 created wheels with larger bearings that fit bolts with a diameter of 12 mm. This was done to increase the strength of the bolts and bearings.
- Scooter specific grip tape - Like on a skateboard, the deck of the scooter is covered with grip tape to ensure good grip under the shoes of the rider. While in the early years of scootering most scooter riders bought large sheets of grip tape made for skateboard, there now exists several companies manufacturing grip tape made specifically for scooters.
- Handle grips by scooter brands - Like it was for the grip tape, early scooter riders often bought grips made for BMX bikes to put on their scooters. Recently, however, scooter companies begun producing handle grips themselves, with scooter specific details in mind when manufacturing.
- Pegs/deck ends - Pegs (like found on a BMX bike) has been around for a while in the scooter community, both for the front and back wheel. In later years their popularity seems to have dropped in favour of deck ends. These are like rear pegs, only fit to match the width of the scooter deck. Having deck ends both allows for more trick options as well as increasing the lifetime of the back end of the scooter deck.

== World Championships ==
In 2012 the first scootering world championships was organized by the International Scooter Association (ISA) (now known as the International Scooter Federation, ISF), won by Dakota Schuetz. Since then, the world championships have been held annually, with exception of the year 2020 due to restrictions as a result of the COVID-19 pandemic. From the year 2019 there has been crowned a winner in three categories: men's park, men's street and women's park (prior to 2019 there was only one category, men's park). The winners are listed below:

Year	Men's park	Men's street	Women's park	Location
2012	Dakota Schuetz (US)	N/A	N/A	Evolution Extreme, Deeside, UK
2013	Dakota Schuetz (US)	N/A	N/A	Scootfest, Stoneleigh, UK
2014	Dakota Schuetz (US)	N/A	N/A	Scootfest, Stoneleigh, UK
2015	Jordan Clark (UK)	N/A	N/A	Extreme Barcelona, Spain
2016	Jordan Clark (UK)	N/A	N/A	Extreme Barcelona, Spain
2017	Dante Hutchinson (UK)	Didine Terchague (FR)	N/A	Extreme Barcelona, Spain
2018	Jordan Clark (UK)	N/A	N/A	Extreme Barcelona, Spain
2019	Jon Marco Gaydos (US)	Auguste Pellaud (FR)	Beca Ortiz (US)	WRG Barcelona, Spain
2020	N/A	N/A	N/A	Copperbox, London, UK (Cancelled)
2021	Jordan Clark (UK)	Luca DiMeglio (FR)	Lucy Evans (UK)	Extreme Barcelona, Spain

There are discussions about including scootering as a new sport in the 2028 Summer Olympics in Los Angeles.

== Rider of the Year ==
The title Rider of the Year (also known as ROTY) is awarded annually by the online scooter media outlet Trendkill Collective. The award is given to the scooter rider voted the best or most impactful that year based on things such as the video footage produced, performance in contests/street jams and overall presence and impression. It is the members of the freestyle scooter community themselves that vote for their favorite rider based on a list of scooter riders that is hand picked by the staff at Trendkill at the end of every year. The tradition started in 2019 and is the only award of its kind in the freestyle scootering community. In 2022 French rider Lucas DiMeglio became the first non-American to win the ROTY award.

Year	Rider of the Year
2019	Reece Doezema (US)
2020	Austin Coates (US)
2021	Devin Szydlowski (US)
2022	Lucas DiMeglio (FR)
2023	Pol Roman (ESP)
2024	Joel Ingold (AUS)

== See also ==
- Ryan Williams (BMX rider)
