= Chris Haffey =

American aggressive inline skater (born 1985)

Personal information
- Born: 7 January 1985 (age 41) Whately, Massachusetts, U.S.
- Occupation: Inline skating rider
- Years active: 1996-present

Sport
- Country: United States
- Sport: Inline skating
- Events: X Games; Nitro Circus
Medal record
Representing United States
Nitro World Games
Gold medal – first place	2016 Salt Lake City	Inline Best Trick
- Updated on 13 August 2018

Chris Haffey (born January 7, 1985, in Whately, Massachusetts) is an American aggressive inline skater.

== Biography ==
Like many inline skaters Chris Haffey began rollerskating as a child and by the age of 11 switched to single row inline skates. Upon moving to Atlanta he was introduced to the Aggressive skating discipline, through ice hockey before returning to California.

While in California, Chris Haffey was submerged in the culture of California's aggressive skating scene by former professional turned producer, Brian Bell, and through him met skating industry leader Kato Mateu. The two became good friends as Kato sponsored many of Haffey's moves through his company Remz.

Haffey was casually skating street until 2004 when he won the ASA finals and began competing regularly on the amateur and professional circuits. This was a turning point for him and his importance in the sport grew as he consistently placed in podium positions thereafter, escalating him to the ranks of pioneers in the sport before him such as Arlo Eisenberg, Aaron Feinberg, or Brian Shima.

Long shunned by the action sports community at large Haffey's talent and professionalism has popularised street style rollerblading back to the action sports community by being included in press releases by ESPN as member of "Team USA". During his participation in the Nitro Circus Live Tour, he was cited as the 'best rollerblader in the world' for their Las Vegas Show

His most recent achievement was winning first place at the X-Games in the Aggressive Inline Street category. On December 9, 2011, Haffey broke the world record for longest jump ever done on inline skates. Aided by a ramp and a cable-system, Haffey jumped 30 meters in the air and landed successfully on skates. The event took place at an extreme sports event called AIR F.I.S.E in Marseille.

== Competition titles ==
- 2002 – 1st Atlanta IMYTA
- 2002 – 1st Detroit IMYTA
- 2003 – 1st Puerto Rico IMYTA Final Four
- 2003 – 2nd Eisenbergs Hoedown
- 2004 – 1st Barn Burner
- 2004 – 1st LG World Championships
- 2004 – 1st Eisenbergs Hoedown
- 2005 – 2nd LG World Tour Munich
- 2005 – 1st LG World Tour Paris
- 2005 – 1st LG World Championships
- 2005 – 1st Barn Burner
- 2005 – 2nd Eisenbergs Hoedown
- 2006 – 1st Barn Burner
- 2006 – 1st (tie) SDSF OPEN Escondido
- 2006 – 1st Australian Championships
- 2006 – 2nd Asian X Games
- 2006 – 1st Asian X Games Best Trick
- 2007 – 2nd Barn Burner
- 2007 – 1st LG World Championships
- 2007 – 1st Eisenbergs Hoedown
- 2007 – 2nd Asian X Games
- 2007 – 1st AIL WorldFinals WoodwardW
- 2007 – 2nd Bitter Cold Showdown
- 2007 – 1st SDSF OPEN Escondido
- 2008 – 3rd Bitter Cold Showdown
- 2008 – 2nd NASS
- 2008 – 1st SDSF OPEN
- 2009 – Gold XGames Shanghai
- 2010 – 1st Bitter Cold Showdown
- 2011 – Gold XGames Shanghai

== Filmography ==
- 2 Feet
- Barely Dead
- CHARG!NG
- Coup d'état (USD)
- Demode
- Drip Drop
- Fade Nation
- KFC 3 "straight jacket"
- Killer Boots
- Leading the Blind
- Noir
- On top
- Pariah
- Regardless
- Rejects Issue 5
- Shred Till Your Dead I & II
- Street Dwellaz 1, 2, & 3
- United Front
- US
- VG20
- W.A.R. - We Are Rollerbladers (directed by Tyler Shields)
