= Nitro World Games 2018 =

Extreme sport competition

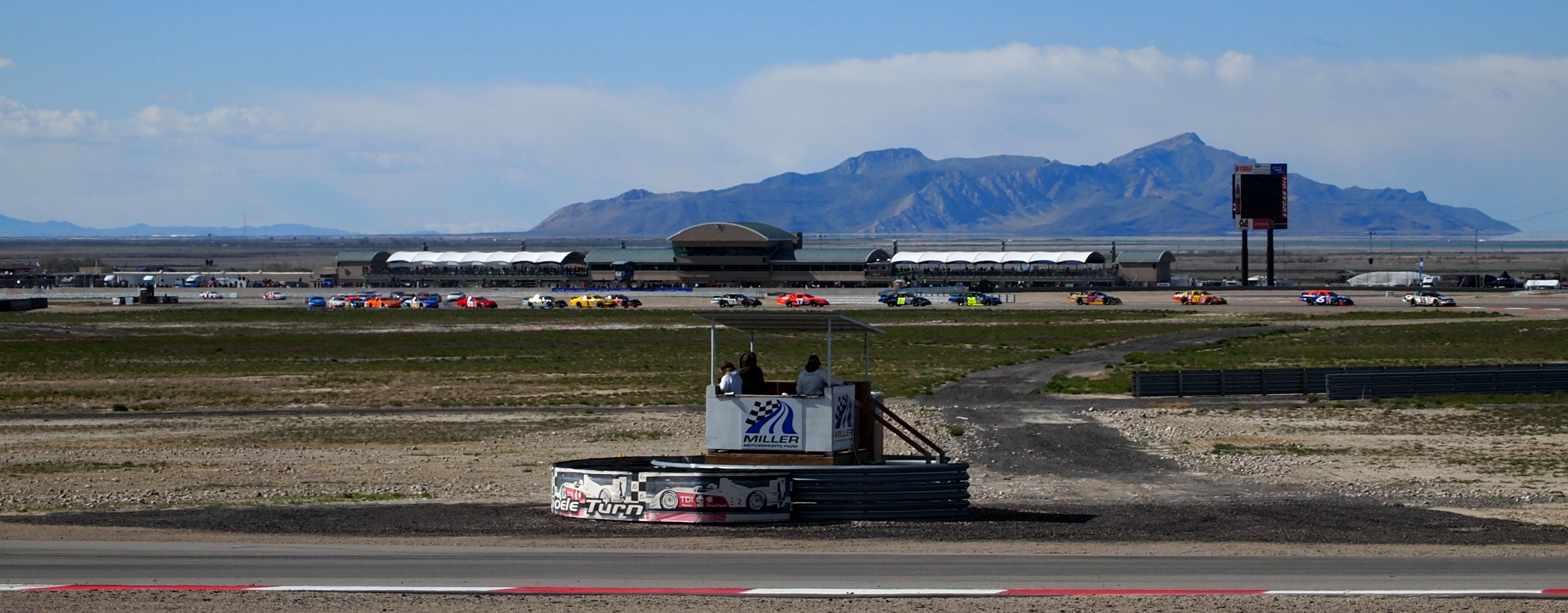
- Location: (United States) Erda, Utah (United States) Vista, California Corby, United Kingdom Paris, France
- Date: August 10–December 1

Nitro World Games 2018 was an action sports competition by Nitro Circus that took place between August 10 and December 1, 2018 primarily at Utah Motorsports Campus in Erda, Utah with events also being held at CA Training Facility in Vista, California Paris, France and Adrenaline Alley in Corby, United Kingdom.

This Nitro World Games was the first held at multiple venues and the first with venues outside the United States. The games were broadcast live through social media platforms.

== Results ==
=== Medal count ===
Rank	Nation	Gold	Silver	Bronze	Total
1	Australia (AUS)	4	1	2	7
2	United States (USA)*	2	4	4	10
3	Czech Republic (CZE)	1	1	1	3
3	Japan (JPN)	1	1	1	3
5	Sweden (SWE)	1	1	0	2
6	France (FRA)*	1	0	1	2
7	Finland (FIN)	1	0	0	1
8	Estonia (EST)	0	3	0	3
9	Great Britain (GBR)*	0	0	2	2
Totals (9 entries)		11	11	11	33

=== Vista ===
Event	Gold		Silver		Bronze	
BMX Park	Logan Martin (AUS)	91.40	Dennis Enarson (USA)	90.00	Ben Wallace (GBR)	88.40
Men's Skateboard Park	Alex Sorgente (USA)	92.00	Ben Hatchell (USA)	90.00	Cory Juneau (USA)	89.00
Women's Skateboard Park	Lizzie Armanto (FIN)	84.66	Kisa Nakamura (JPN)	81.66	Sakura Yosozumi (JPN)	78.33
Skateboard Vert	Moto Shibata (JPN)	89.00	Elliot Sloan (USA)	87.66	Jono Schwan (USA)	83.00

=== Erda ===
Event	Gold		Silver		Bronze	
FMX Best Trick	Pat Bowden (AUS)	89.72	Josh Sheehan (AUS)	82.77	Adam Jones (USA)	82.12
FMX Quarterpipe	Colby Raha (USA)	45' 2"	Axell Hodges (USA)	42' 10"	Corey Creed (AUS)	38' 6"
Nitro Rallycross	Timmy Hansen (SWE)	6:49.69	Mattias Ekström (SWE)	6:52.16	Tanner Foust (USA)	6:56.25

=== Corby ===
Event	Gold		Silver		Bronze	
Scootfest: King of Bowl	Richard Zelinka (CZE)	96.00	Roomet Säälik (EST)	90.66	Dylan Morrison (AUS)	86.66
Scootfest: King of Park	Dylan Morrison (AUS)	92.00	Roomet Säälik (EST)	89.66	Jordan Clark (GBR)	87.00
Scootfest: King of Street	Auguste Pellaud (FRA)	85.82	Richard Zelinka (CZE)	80.82	Jonathan Perroni (FRA)	76.65

=== Paris ===
Event	Gold		Silver		Bronze	
Scooter Best Trick	Ryan Williams (AUS)	17.70	Roomet Säälik (EST)	15.66	Richard Zelinka (CZE)	15.58
