= Nitro Circus: The Movie =

- Theatrical release poster
- Directed by: Gregg Godfrey; Jeremy Rawle
- Written by: Gregg Godfrey; Jeremy Rawle; Travis Pastrana
- Based on: Nitro Circus by Gregg Godfrey; Jeremy Rawle; Travis Pastrana; Johnny Knoxville; Jeff Tremaine; Trip Taylor
- Produced by: Gregg Godfrey; Jeremy Rawle; Travis Pastrana; Dave Hunter
- Starring: Gregg Godfrey; Jeremy Rawle; Travis Pastrana; Jolene Van Vugt; Street Bike Tommy; Jim DeChamp; Special Greg; Erik Roner
- Narrated by: Travis Pastrana
- Cinematography: Donny Anderson; Brandon Christensen
- Edited by: Seth Torok
- Music by: Damien Starkey; Paul Phillips
- Production companies: Godfrey Entertainment; Planet P Studios
- Distributed by: ARC Entertainment
- Release date: August 8, 2012
- Running time: 92 minutes
- Country: United States
- Language: English
- Budget: $7 million
- Box office: $4.2 million

Nitro Circus: The Movie is a 2012 American 3D action comedy reality film based on the MTV eponymous reality comedy series. Directed by Gregg Godfrey and Jeremy Rawle, it was both a critical and commercial failure, grossing little more than half its $7 million budget.

== Cast ==
- Gregg Godfrey as himself
- Jeremy Rawle as himself
- Travis Pastrana as himself
- Jolene Van Vugt as herself
- Streetbike Tommy as himself
- Jim DeChamp as himself
- Special Greg as himself
- Erik Roner as himself

=== Interviews ===
- Jeff Tremaine
- Johnny Knoxville
- Channing Tatum
- Rob Dyrdek
- Ryan Sheckler
- Ken Block
- Bill Gerber
- Bob Burnquist
- Dick Godfrey
- Dov Ribnick

== Reception ==
Nitro Circus: The Movie received extremely negative reviews, currently holding 6% on Rotten Tomatoes. The film grossed $3,377,618 domestically and an additional $806,697 overseas for a worldwide total of $4,183,697.
