= Tooele Valley Airport =

Airport in Tooele County, Utah, United States

Tooele Valley Airport Bolinder Field
- IATA: none; ICAO: KTVY; FAA LID: TVY

Summary
- Airport type: Public
- Owner: Salt Lake City Department of Airports
- Serves: Tooele, Utah
- Elevation AMSL: 4,321 ft / 1,317 m
- Coordinates: 40°36′45.2″N 112°21′02.8″W
- Website: www.slcairport.com/...
- Interactive map of Tooele Valley Airport

Runways
Direction	Length		Surface
Direction	ft	m	Surface
17/35	6,102	1,860	Asphalt

Statistics (2023)
- Aircraft operations (year ending 9/21/2023): 70,424
- Based aircraft: 22
- Sources: SLC Dept of Airports, FAA

Tooele Valley Airport (ICAO: KTVY, FAA LID: TVY), also known as Bolinder Field, is a public use airport in Erda, Tooele County, Utah, United States. It is owned by the Salt Lake City Department of Airports and is located five nautical miles (9.26 km) northwest of the central business district of the City of Tooele. According to the FAA's National Plan of Integrated Airport Systems for 2009–2013, it is categorized as a general aviation airport.

Although most U.S. airports use the same three-letter location identifier for the FAA and IATA, this airport is assigned TVY by the FAA but has no designation from the IATA (which assigned TVY to Dawei Airport in Dawei, Myanmar).

== Facilities and aircraft ==
Bolinder Field-Tooele Valley Airport covers an area of 641 acres (259 ha) at an elevation of 4,321 feet (1,317 m) above mean sea level. It has one runway designated 17/35 with an asphalt surface measuring 6,102 by 100 feet (1,860 x 30 m).

For the 12-month period ending September 21, 2023, the airport had 70,424 aircraft operations, an average of 193 per day: 99% general aviation, and 1% air taxi. At that time there were 22 aircraft based at this airport: all single-engine.

== See also ==
- List of airports in Utah
