= Gregg Godfrey =

American writer, producer and director (born 1969)

- Born: May 26, 1969 (age 57); Draper, Utah, United States
- Occupations: Writer, director, producer
- Writing career
- Period: 1998–present
- Notable works: Nitro Circus, Thrillbillies, Supercross Exposed, Global Addiction, Children of a Metal God
- Website: godfreyclan.com

Gregg Godfrey (born May 26, 1969) is an American writer, producer and director. His first short film was Children of a Metal God, and he is most noted for his work on Nitro Circus, a video series he created in his garage with motocross racer Travis Pastrana in 2003. The show also inspired Nitro Circus: The Movie and Nitro Circus Live, a live show and reality television program.

== Biography ==
Born in Draper, Utah to Dic, a long-haul trucker, and Diane, a stay-at-home mother, Godfrey attended Ricks College on a wrestling scholarship before serving a mission for the Church of Jesus Christ of Latter-day Saints in Italy. After returning home, Godfrey attended the University of Utah, where he earned a degree in film.

Godfrey first worked as a stuntman for Disney but soon left to pursue his own film career. He made his first short documentary film, Legacy in 1995. The video chronicled Godfrey's travels around the country learning about and participating in high action sports such as base jumping, motocross, off-road racing and more. Over the next three years, he made three other short documentaries for Fox Head: Children of a Metal God, Children of a Metal God: Scar Tissue, Children of a Metal God: Redemption, all about action sports. In the early 2000s, Godfrey continued to make documentaries, including Global Addiction, Travis Pastrana's Baja Diaries and Supercross Exposed, before transitioning into television with Nitro Circus and Thillbillies. His work on developing the Beyond Pro format, an EnduroCross racing style, with Edge PowerSports founder Bryan Green quickly became a motocross fan favorite.

In November 2007, Godfrey won the Baja 1000, setting a world record for his 1280-mile, 40-hour-and-22-minute solo motorbike run of the off-road race. Later that month, Godfrey's nephew Tanner was paralyzed in a motocross accident. On November 17, 2008, Godfrey set the world record for the longest semi-truck ramp jump, the first of its kind, measuring 50 ft, 6 in.

Godfrey, along with other members of Nitro Circus, appeared in the 2009 Puddle of Mudd music video for the song Spaceship. On May 10, 2011, Godfrey suffered a serious crash doing a loop-the-loop in Brisbane, Australia while rehearsing for a live performance.

In 2015, Godfrey was recognized by Forbes Magazine for his work on Nitro Circus Live, which ranked 22nd as Forbes Magazine’s Most Promising Companies. Godfrey began producing Nitro Circus DVDs in 2003, Fuel TV picked it up as a miniseries in 2006, and MTV picked up the series in 2009. The company has since grown into a multimillion-dollar television, movie and live-action show franchise. Godfrey and his wife own the production company, Godfrey Entertainment.

As of August 8, 2015, Greg Godfrey and the Godfrey Clan left Nitro Circus and performed at the Inaugural Mastercraft Throwdown, an X-Games event.
