= Elliot Sloan =

American skateboarder

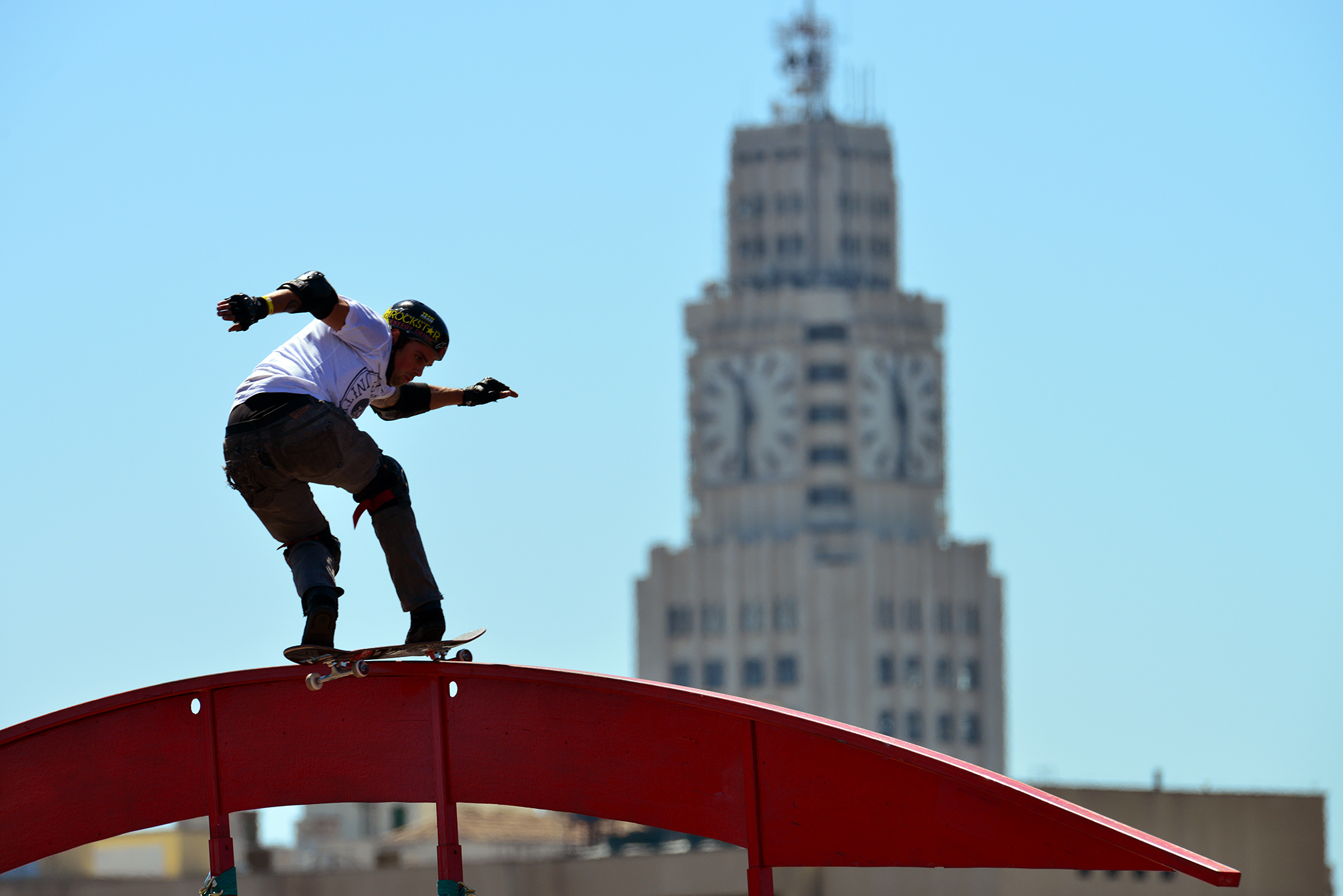
- Sloan performing at the 4th Mega Ramp in Rio de Janeiro, 2012

Personal information
- Born: July 29, 1988 (age 37) New York City, U.S.
- Website: www.elliotsloan.com

Sport
- Country: United States
- Sport: Skateboarding
Medal record
Summer X Games
Representing United States
Gold medal – first place	2013 Los Angeles	Skateboard Big Air
Silver medal – second place	2015 Austin	Skateboard Big Air
Silver medal – second place	2015 Austin	Skateboard/BMX Big Air Doubles
Silver medal – second place	2013 Foz do Iguaçu	Skateboard Big Air
Silver medal – second place	2013 Munich	Skateboard Big Air
Bronze medal – third place	2010 Los Angeles	Skateboard Big Air Rail Jam
Bronze medal – third place	2013 Barcelona	Skateboard Big Air
Gold medal – first place	2019 Minneapolis	Skateboard Big Air
Nitro World Games
Representing United States
Gold medal – first place	2016 Salt Lake City	Skateboard Best Trick
Gold medal – first place	2017 Salt Lake City	Skateboard Best Trick
Silver medal – second place	2018 Vista	Skateboard Vert

Elliot Sloan (born July 29, 1988) is an American professional skateboarder. He is a sixteen-time X Games medalist (7 Gold), most recently winning gold in the Skateboard vert best trick event at the 2023 X Games in Japan.

Sloan was born in New York City and was raised there. He cites Tony Hawk as an influence for him to begin skateboarding.

Besides skateboarding, Sloan is also an active guitarist. He was the lead guitarist and bassist of the melodic death metal project The Stranded, which released 1 album on July 2nd 2012, Survivalism Boulevard. In 2020 he formed the metal act Night Fiends with In Flames drummer Tanner Wayne.
