= Nitro World Games 2017 =

Extreme sport competition

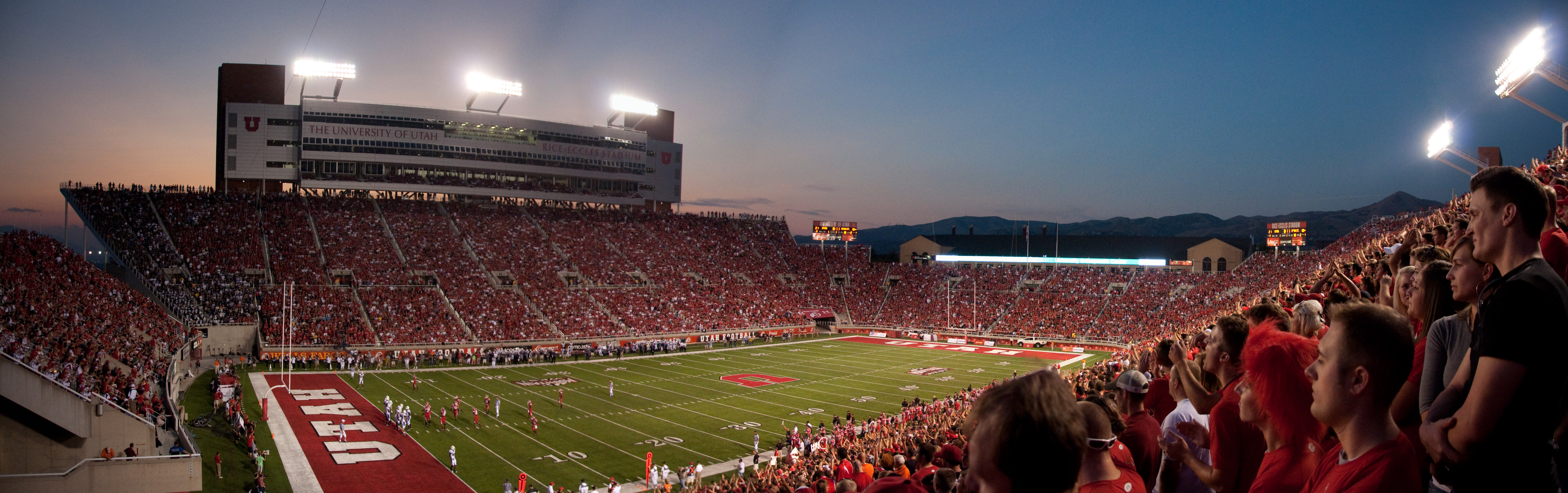
- Venue: Rice–Eccles Stadium
- Location: (United States) Salt Lake City, Utah
- Date: June 24

Nitro World Games 2017 was an action sports competition by Nitro Circus that took place on June 24, 2017, at the Rice-Eccles Stadium in Salt Lake City, Utah.

The games were broadcast live through social media platforms.

== Results ==
=== Medal count ===
| Rank | Nation | Gold | Silver | Bronze | Total |
|---|---|---|---|---|---|
| 1 | Australia (AUS) | 3 | 1 | 3 | 7 |
| 2 | United States (USA)* | 2 | 3 | 3 | 8 |
| 3 | New Zealand (NZL) | 1 | 0 | 0 | 1 |
| 4 | Belgium (BEL) | 0 | 1 | 0 | 1 |
| 4 | Chile (CHL) | 0 | 1 | 0 | 1 |
| Totals (5 entries) | | 6 | 6 | 6 | 18 |

=== Podium Details ===
| Event | Gold | | Silver | | Bronze | |
|---|---|---|---|---|---|---|
| BMX Best Trick | Ryan Williams (AUS) | 18.70 | Brandon Loupos (AUS) | 18.22 | Jaie Toohey (AUS) | 16.58 |
| BMX Triple Hit | Colton Walker (USA) | 9.50 | Nick Bruce (USA) | 9.42 | Brian Fox (USA) | 9.36 |
| FMX Best Trick | Harry Bink (AUS) | 9.02 | William van den Putte (BEL) | 8.99 | Pat Bowden (AUS) | 8.88 |
| FMX (Freestyle) | Levi Sherwood (NZL) | 71.63 | Javier Villegas (CHL) | 67.65 | Josh Sheehan (AUS) | 67.57 |
| Scooter Best Trick | Ryan Williams (AUS) | 17.12 | Tyler Chaffin (USA) | 16.88 | Cody Flom (USA) | 16.50 |
| Skateboard Best Trick | Elliot Sloan (USA) | 7.52 | Beaver Fleming (USA) | 7.15 | Andy Macdonald (USA) | 7.09 |
