= Nitro Circus =

Action sport collective led by Travis Pastrana

- Created by: Archie Holden; Jeremy Rawle; Jeff Tremaine; Travis Pastrana; Johnny Knoxville; Trip Taylor
- Written by: Gregg Godfrey; Johnny Knoxville; Travis Pastrana; Jeremy Rawle; Trip Taylor; Jeff Tremaine
- Directed by: Jeff Tremaine (3 episodes)
- Starring: Travis Pastrana; Andy Bell; Jolene Van Vugt; Greg Powell; Jim DeChamp; Erik Roner; Tommy Passemante
- Country of origin: United States
- Original language: English
- No. of seasons: 2
- No. of episodes: 21

Production
- Executive producers: Gregg Godfrey; Jeremy Rawle; Jeff Tremaine; Travis Pastrana; Johnny Knoxville; Trip Taylor
- Producer: Shanna Zablow Newton
- Cinematography: Donny Anderson; Dimitry Elyashkevich
- Editors: Miles Barken; Stephen Wein; Seth Torok; Matthew Kosinski; Matthew Probst; Brian Forbes; Mark Hansen
- Running time: 22 minutes
- Production company: Dickhouse Productions

Original release
- Network: MTV
- Release: February 8 – October 22, 2009

Related
- Nitro Circus Live; Nitro Circus: The Movie

Nitro Circus was an "action sport collective" led by Travis Pastrana, featuring his friends and him traveling around the world riding dirtbikes, BASE jumping, and performing stunts. Co-founded in 2003 by Pastrana, Nitro Circus became a media company that produces television programming, documentaries and the Nitro Circus Live tour. In 2016, the company introduced the Nitro World Games, an action sports competition designed around pushing progression in core action sports disciplines like FMX, BMX, skate and scooter.

== History ==
=== DVDs ===
The collective began by releasing 8 DVDs during the early 2000s. Good sales led to the creation of the television show.

Title
Travis & the Nitro Circus
Travis & the Nitro Circus 2
Nitro Circus 3
Nitro Circus 4: Lock N Load
Nitro Circus 5: Thrillbillies
Nitro Circus 6: Thrillbillies Doublewide
Nitro Circus 7: Country Fried
Nitro Circus: Greatest Hits

=== Television show ===
Originally run as a 2006 miniseries on Fuel TV, it began running as an episodic reality television show on MTV that featured people performing various dangerous stunts. Nitro Circus officially debuted on February 8, 2009; Season 2 premiered on August 27, 2009.

=== 3D film ===
Nitro Circus: The Movie 3D was released August 8, 2012 in the United States and November 15, 2012 in Australia and New Zealand for one week.

Jim DeChamp suffered a serious back injury on June 29, 2011, while shooting for the 3D film. After undergoing surgery, his doctors indicated there was no spinal damage and that they expect him to make a full recovery.

Damien Starkey and Paul Phillips, both ex-Puddle of Mudd members, scored the movie and provided the majority of the music. This was done through Starkey's company Give 2 Get Music.

== Nitro Circus Live ==
Nitro Circus Live is a reality television show. It follows Travis Pastrana and the Nitro Circus crew as they perform live all around the world.

== Nitro World Games ==
The Nitro World Games is an action sports competition featuring rallycross, freestyle motocross, BMX, kick scooter and skateboard competitions. The 2016 and 2017 editions were held at Rice-Eccles Stadium in Salt Lake City, Utah. The 2018 edition had four venues in the United States, United Kingdom and France.

== Cast ==
=== The Nitro Crew ===
Travis Pastrana
Titles: "Pro action sports athlete", "Actionsports Legend".
Pastrana is the Ringleader of the Nitro Circus Crew, is a pro FMX rider, rallycar driver, and former NASCAR driver, and is usually the first to attempt any stunt involving dirt bikes or BMX bikes.
Andy Bell
Title: "Washed-up motorcycle rider"
Former FMX rider. Bell holds a rivalry with Pastrana involving Big Wheel tricycles stemming from the first episode of the series.
Jolene Van Vugt
Title: "Pro motocross racer", "Nitro Circus".
Known by her nickname "Nitro Girl".
Canadian Female Motocross Champion. She joins Pastrana in many stunts involving dirt bikes. Van Vugt took on more of a cheerleading role in the second season after breaking her arm and can be seen wearing a pink cast throughout the season.
Jim DeChamp
Title: "Pro mountain biker"
Known by his nickname "T-Rex".
Pro mountain bike downhill racer and freestyle rider. He has been friends with Pastrana since childhood. They collaborate on many stunts together on the show. Became the first person to land a front-flip on a motorbike to dirt, as seen in the 7th episode of the first season.
Erik Roner
Title: "Pro skier/base jumper", "Nitro Circus"
Known by his nickname "Rubberneck".
Pro extreme skier and base jumper. Roner was usually the first to attempt any stunt involving snow. On September 28, 2015, Roner sustained fatal injuries while wingsuiting in Squaw Valley, CA.
Tommy Passemante
Title: "Construction Worker"
Known by his nickname "Street Bike Tommy", given for a failed stunt in which he attempted to jump his Suzuki GSX-R motorcycle into the foam pit but overshot, breaking both his legs. He functions as the comic relief member of the crew, and is commonly employed for stunts that are the most dangerous and require the least talent, known as "zero-skill stunts".
Greg Powell
Title: "Travis' cousin"
Pastrana's cousin. Going by the nickname "Special Greg", Powell is the all-around member of the team, and generally attempts any stunt on the show. He was the first person to land a "Special Flip" on a BMX bike. He was a wide receiver on the University of Maryland football team from 2003–06 and is currently an over-the-wall crewman for Pastrana in NASCAR.
Gregg Godfrey
Known by his nickname "Muscle Hampster".
Jeremy Rawle
Title: "Nitro Circus Producer"
Known by his nickname "Tenacious J".
Lyn-Z Adams Hawkins
Title: "X Games Gold Medalist".
Known by her nickname "Baby Hawkins".
Dusty Wygle
Title: "Nitro Circus".
Aaron Sauvage
Title: "Nitro Circus".
Known by his nickname "Crum".
Hubert Rowland
Known by his nickname "Everyone's Favorite RedNek". Hubert not only serves as action sports legend Travis Pastrana's mechanic but is also a stunt man himself. Additionally, he is an engineering mastermind and renowned track builder for Nitro Circus, Monster Energy AMA Supercross, Monster Jam, X Games, Global Rally Cross and several other entities. In 2017, Hubert became the first person to travel coast-to-coast in a UTV, undertaking a 5000-mile journey through 11 states in 29 days, along with several celebrities.

Peter Rowinski

old members- Ronnie Renner, Kenny Bartram, Levi LaVallee, Cam McQueen.

=== Nitro Circus Live Athletes ===
==== BMX ====
Chad Kagy
Title: "X Games Gold Medalist".
Andy Buckworth
Known by his nickname "Andy Pandy".
Jaie Toohey
Matt Whyatt
Andrew Ahumada
Title: "BMX Pro".
James Foster
Title: "BMX Pro".
Jed Mildon
Known by his nickname "Warrior".
Austin Hanson
Todd Meyn
Ryan Williams

==== Mountain Bike ====
Ethen Roberts
Title: "X Games Medalist"
Gavin Godfrey

==== Skate ====
Christopher 'Beaver' Fleming
Title: "Pro Skateboarder".
Bob Burnquist

==== Freestyle Motocross ====
Cam Sinclair

Blake Williams
Title: "X Games Gold Medalist".
Jarryd McNeil
Steve Mini
Sam Boyd
Clinton Moore
Title: "FMX Pro".
Michael Norris
Matty McFerran
Rob Adelberg
Taka Higashino
Adam Jones
Josh Sheehan
Title: "X Games FMX Medalist"
Mark Monea
Brad Burch
Thomas Pagès
Title: "FMX Pro".
Beau
Bruce Cook
Uses modified motorcycle due to paralysis of legs

==== Inline Skates ====
Chris Haffey
Title: "X Games Gold Medalist".

==== WCMX ====
Aaron Fotheringham
Title: "Wheelchair Athlete", "Extreme Wheelchair Athlete"
Known by his nickname: "Wheelz".
Mark Zupan
Title:"Wheelchair Athlete".

==== Scooters ====
Ryan Williams
Corey Funk
Capron Funk
Tyler Chaffin
Title: "Pro Scooter Rider".

==== Ski ====
Rory Bushfield
Title: "Pro Freestyle Skier".

==== Mountain Board ====
Matt Brind
Title: "Mountainboarding".

==== Contraptions ====
J Cole Edginton
Ethen Godfrey Roberts
Rory Bushfield

==== Nitro Grommets ====
Meghan Godfrey
Chanler Godfrey
Tyler Roberts

==== MC's ====
Bruce Robson
Title: "Nitro Circus MC".
Laurette Nicoll
Andy Zeiss
Title: "Nitro Circus MC".
Busty Wolter
Title: "Nitro Circus MC".
JR: Member David Hammond".

== See also ==
- Jackass
- The Dudesons
- Dirty Sanchez
- Adrenaline Crew
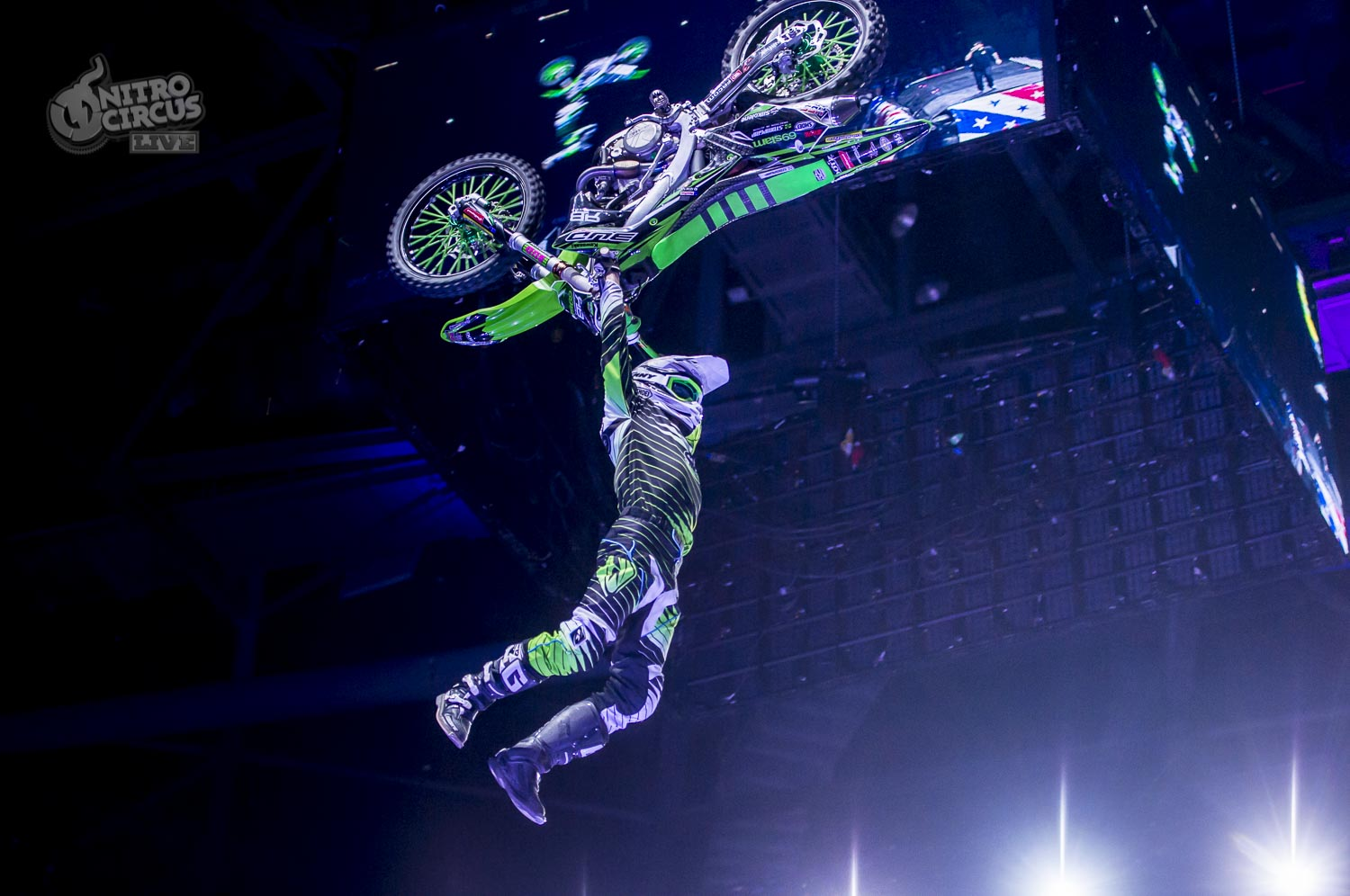
London, UK 2016

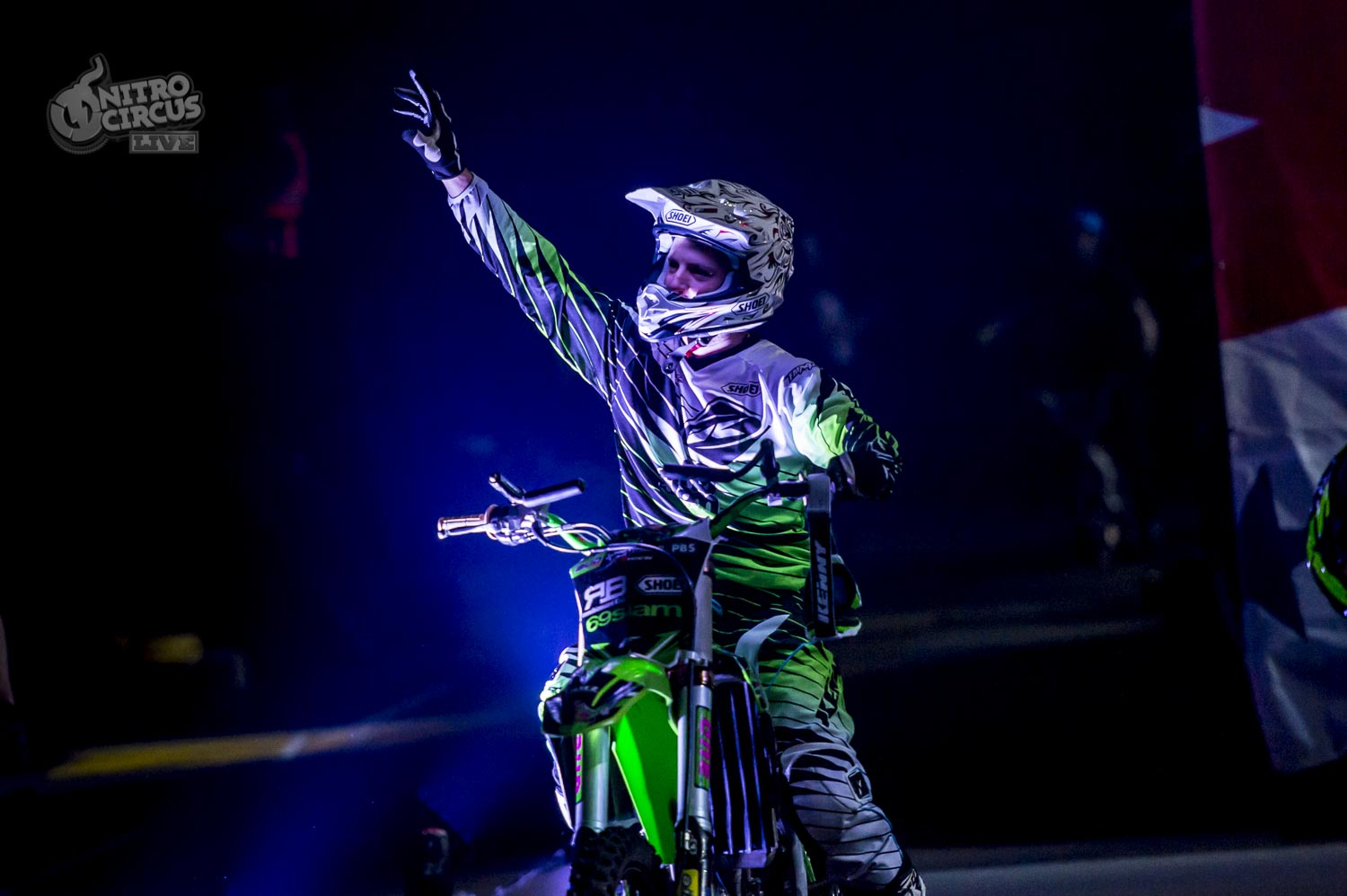
London, UK 2016

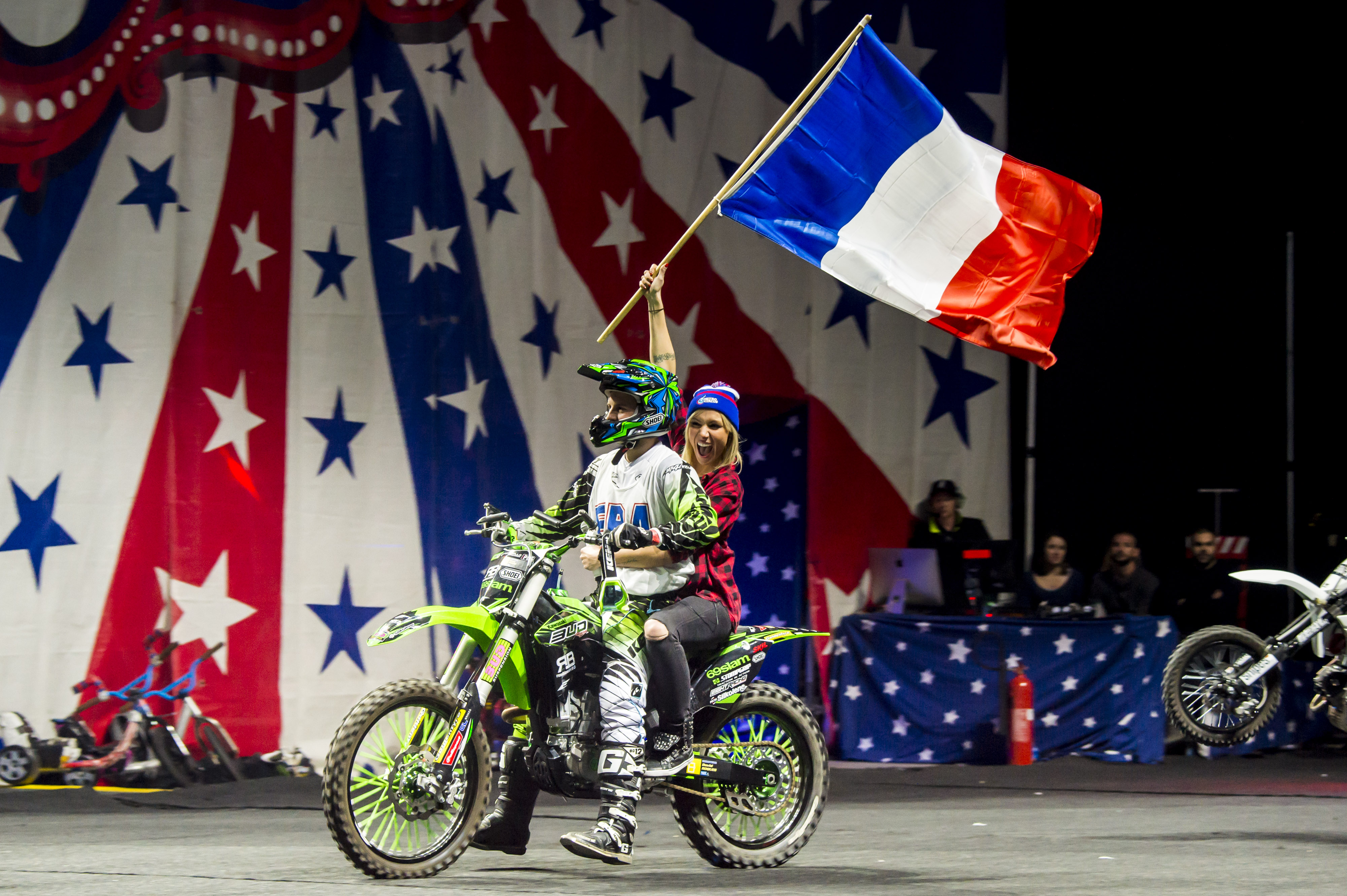
Paris, France 2016
