= Andy Bell (freestyle motocross rider) =

Canadian motorcycle racer and media producer

- Born: Andrew Bell; December 31, 1975 (age 50); Penticton, British Columbia, Canada
- Occupations: Owner, Sweatpants Media, Professional Stuntman, FMX Athlete, Nitro Circus Legend

Andy Bell (born December 31, 1975) is a Canadian-American former freestyle motocross rider and racer who later starred in the Nitro Circus DVDs and television series on MTV.

== Early career ==
Bell was born in Penticton, BC, Canada. He rode FMX professionally from 1998 to 2002, ranking top 10 in the world for 3 years and winning the Canadian FMX Championship in 2001. He was the first "factory" sponsored FMX rider, getting sponsored by KTM Motorcycles in 1999. Before that, he raced motocross professionally from 1993 to 1997 and was ranked in the top 10 in Canada for 4 years. He has appeared in over 30 motocross movies and is the holder of 9 Guinness World Records. Bell has ridden and performed in over 20 countries throughout his career. He was also the Vice-President of promotions for Ogio for 6 of his 8 years there.

== Television and film work ==
Bell has appeared on many TV shows and stations including Fox Sports Net, MTV, MTV2, FUEL TV, Bluetorch, 54321, Rob Dyrdek's Fantasy Factory, Daily Habit, Red Bull X Fighters, Eurosport, Loiter Squad, The Dudesons In America, and National Geographic. He also had appeared as himself in Jackass 3D and Jackass 3.5, performing a number of different stunts. Bell has also hosted numerous TV shows including Fuel TV's Dew Underground, The Daily Habit, MTV's The Ultimate Parkour Challenge and the Red Bull X Fighters Live TV broadcast. Bell fought in EllisMania and was defeated by Jason Ellis in a close bout.

Bell has worked as a Screen Actors Guild stuntman and precision driver, appearing in several films and commercials.

== Car racing ==
Bell raced the 2011 Dodge Viper Cup in Millville, NJ, where he finished 4th overall in his first Viper race. Bell was invited to compete in the 2012 Dodge Viper Cup race in Watkins Glenn, NY, where he finished in 2nd place to the series champion in the race. Bell is an accomplished desert racer, winning the SCORE Stock Mini Class Championship in 2012 his rookie season, with wins in the Baja 500 driving for Toyota & Long Beach Racers. Bell also competed in the 2013 Toyota Celebrity Grand Prix of Long Beach where he qualified in second place and lead the race for 5 laps before a mishap while battling with Adam Carolla put him in the wall. Bell also won his first Baja 1000 for Toyota in Stock Full class in a TRD Pro Tundra, leading a team composed of Jamie Bestwick, Ryan Millen and Ted Moncure, with the legendary Ivan Stewart as the teams mentor.

== Sweatpants Media ==
Following his departure from Nitro Circus, Bell started working behind the camera. In April 2012 Bell co-founded a film production company with director Jonny Zeller called Sweatpants Media. Bell works as the executive producer of Sweatpants Media. Sweatpants Media first project was a web series for Red Bull featuring Travis Pastrana. Since then they have worked with athletes from Louie Vito, Elena Hight, Bob Burnquist and Jamie Bestwick. Clients include Toyota, Panasonic, Dodge and WACOM. Sweatpants Media just announced an upcoming project with Red Bull to do an 8 series online featuring Bryce Menzies as he defends the pro 2WD championship at the TORC off-road Racing.
