= Erda, Utah =

City in Utah, United States

Erda
- City
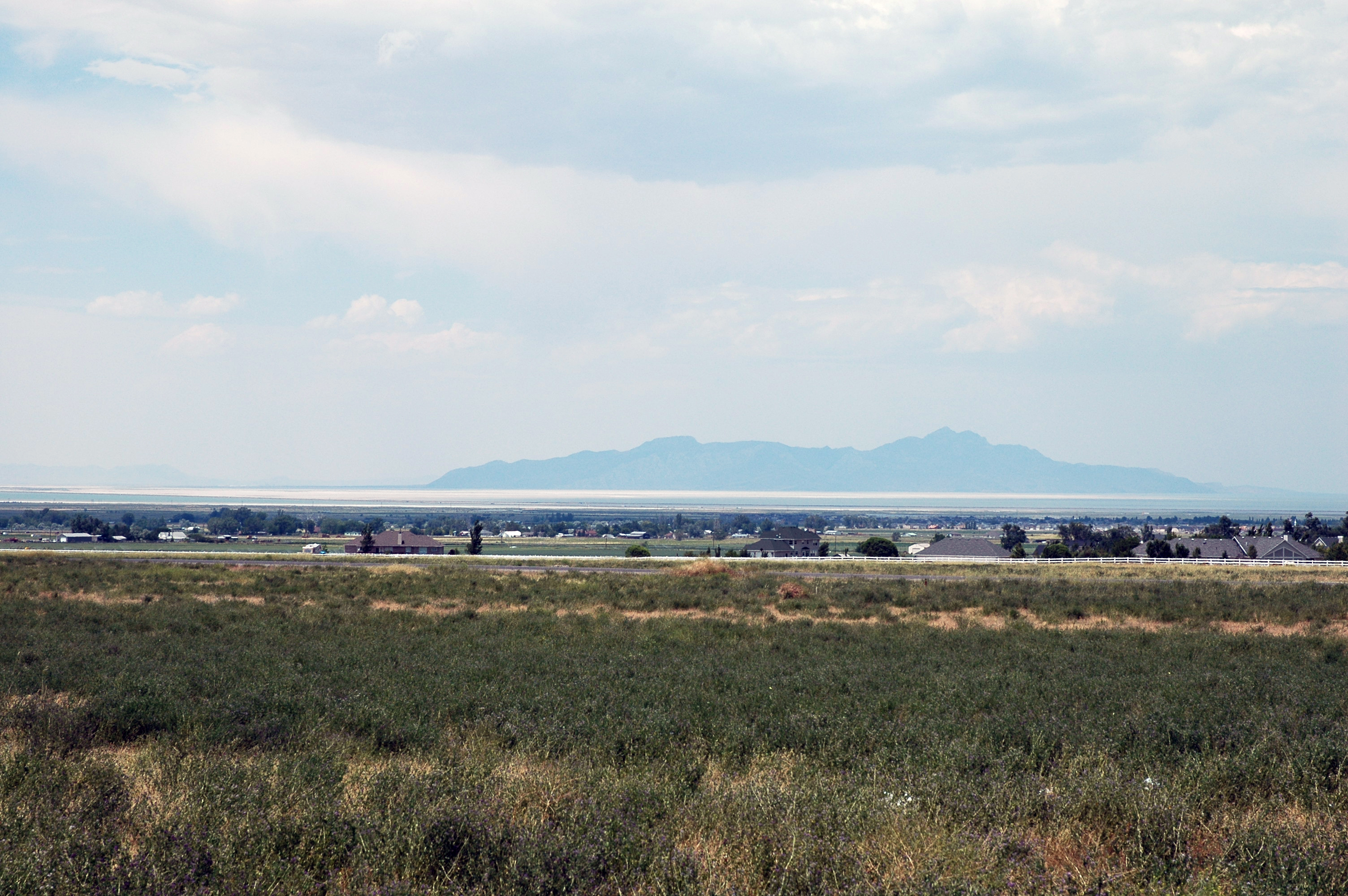
- View of Erda looking at the Great Salt Lake and Stansbury Island

- Seal
- Interactive map of Erda
- Location within Utah Location within the United States
- Coordinates: 40°36′21″N 112°19′40″W
- Country: United States
- State: Utah
- County: Tooele County
- Established: 1852
- Incorporated as a city: January 3, 2022

Area
  - Total: 22.5 sq mi (58.2 km^{2})
  - Land: 22.5 sq mi (58.2 km^{2})
  - Water: 0 sq mi (0.0 km^{2})
- Elevation: 4,337 ft (1,322 m)

Population (2020)
  - Total: 3,673
  - Density: 163/sq mi (63.1/km^{2})
- Time zone: UTC-7 (Mountain (MST))
  - Summer (DST): UTC-6 (MDT)
- ZIP code: 84074
- Area code: 435
- FIPS code: 49-23640
- GNIS feature ID: 2830630
- Website: erda.gov

Erda (/ˈɜːr.də/, UR-də) is a city in Tooele County, Utah, United States. The population was 4,642 at the 2010 census, a significant increase from the 2000 figure of 2,473. Erda was previously a Census-Designated Place (CDP) and a township, but it officially received its incorporation certificate in January 2022.

== Geography and history ==
Erda is located just south Stansbury Park, west of SR-36, and north of the county seat of Tooele. When it was still listed as a CDP, the United States Census Bureau reported its total area as 22.5 square miles (58 km^{2}), all land. The community has been known in the past by the names Bates and Batesville.

== Demographics ==
Historical population
Census	Pop.	Note	%±
1880	145		—
1890	117		−19.3%
1900	183		56.4%
1910	188		2.7%
1920	183		−2.7%
1930	151		−17.5%
1940	188		24.5%
1950	118		−37.2%
1990	1,113		—
2000	2,473		122.2%
2010	4,642		87.7%
2020	3,673		−20.9%

The United States Census Bureau listed Erda as a census designated place until 2023 when it was redesignated a city after incorporation.

As of the census of 2000, there were 2,473 people, 697 households, and 623 families residing in the CDP. The population density was 110.1 people per square mile (42.5 people/km^{2}). There were 722 housing units at an average density of 32.2 units per square mile (12.4 units/km^{2}). The racial makeup of the CDP was 96.93% White, 0.28% African American, 0.36% Native American, 0.32% Asian, 0.53% Pacific Islander, 0.61% from other races, and 0.97% from two or more races. Hispanic or Latino of any race were 4.25% of the population.

There were 697 households, out of which 54.2% had children under 18 living with them, 81.3% were married couples living together, 5.0% had a female householder with no husband present, and 10.6% were non-families. 9.3% of all households were made up of individuals, and 2.4% had someone living alone who was 65 years or older. The average household size was 3.55, and the average family size was 3.81.

In the CDP, the population was spread out, with 38.0% under 18, 8.1% from 18 to 24, 28.9% from 25 to 44, 21.1% from 45 to 64, and 3.9% who were 65 years of age or older. The median age was 30 years. For every 100 females, there were 105.2 males. For every 100 females aged 18 and over, there were 103.6 males.

The median income for a household in the CDP was $62,286, and the median income for a family was $65,494. Males had a median income of $42,386 versus $30,574 for females. The per capita income for the CDP was $18,649. About 3.5% of families and 3.6% of the population were below the poverty line, including 2.3% of those under age 18 and 9.8% of those aged 65 or over.

== Churches and schools ==
As of 2019, there were two churches in Erda. Both churches are meetinghouses of the Church of Jesus Christ of Latter-day Saints (LDS Church), and are located on Erda Way. The LDS Church previously announced a temple would be built in Erda, but after residents expressed concerns with overall development plans, the location was moved to nearby Tooele.

As of 2019, there was only one school in Erda, Excelsior Academy located on Erda Way. Excelsior Academy is a tuition-free, public charter school that functions as both an elementary and middle school, serving grades K–8. The Tooele County School District serves Erda and all of the county.

== Transportation ==
Bolinder Field, also known as Tooele Valley Airport, is located at 4663 N. Airport Road in Erda.

== See also ==
- List of municipalities in Utah
