= X Games Austin 2015 =

2015 extreme sports tournament

- Venue: Circuit of the Americas
- Location: Austin, Texas
- Date: June 4–7

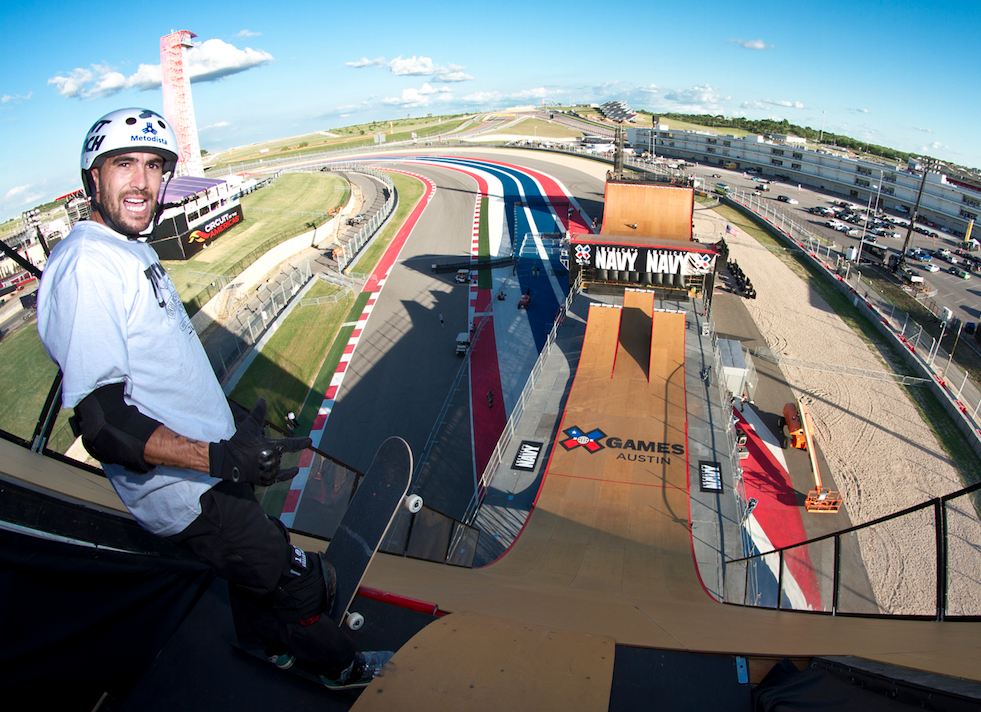
Edgard Pereira standing at the top of a mega ramp at X Games Austin 2015

X Games Austin 2015 was an action sporting event that took place June 4–7, 2015, at the Circuit of the Americas in Austin, Texas.

The 2015 Summer X Games was the second event in a row to be held in Austin and the third full X Games event to be held in the state of Texas; in 2003, a special "Global Championships" event was held in San Antonio, Texas.

The 2015 X Games are once again broadcast on ESPN and ABC. The event debuted three new events; Moto X Flat Track, Moto X Quarter Pipe and Big Air Doubles. This year, X Games Austin attracted 160,000 spectators over four days, making it the most attended X Games since 2004.

== Results ==
=== Flat Track ===
Event	Gold		Silver		Bronze	
X Games Harley-Davidson Flat-Track Racing	Bryan Smith (USA)	8:20.168	Sammy Halbert (USA)	8:20.638	Brad Baker (USA)	8:25.406

=== Moto X ===
Event	Gold		Silver		Bronze	
Men's Moto X Enduro	Mike Brown (USA)	10:09.005	Taylor Robert (USA)	10:15.504	Cody Webb (USA)	10:20.446
Women's Moto X Enduro	Laia Sanz (ESP)	6:37.266	Tarah Gieger (PUR)	6:44.471	Kacy Martinez (USA)	6:58.442
Moto X Best Whip	Jarryd McNeil (AUS)	59.00	Tom Parsons (USA)	10.00	Todd Potter (USA)	10.00
Moto X Step Up	Ronnie Renner (USA)	34.00	Massimo Bianconcini (ITA); Libor Podmol (CZE); Bryce Hudson (USA)	33.00	—	—
Men's Moto X Speed & Style	Nate Adams (USA)	85.50	Blake Williams (AUS)	55.84	Mike Mason (USA)	85.25
Toyota Moto X Quarter Pipe	Thomas Pages (FRA)	95.33	Levi Sherwood (NZL)	93.00	Josh Sheehan (AUS)	87.33

=== Skateboarding ===
Event	Gold		Silver		Bronze	
Skateboard Vert	Pierre-Luc Gagnon (CAN)	92.33	Paul-Luc Ronchetti (GBR)	86.00	Sam Beckett (GBR)	82.33
Skateboard Big Air	Bob Burnquist (BRA)	93.33	Elliot Sloan (USA)	92.00	Tom Schaar (USA)	87.66
Skateboard Park	Curren Caples (USA)	86.00	Pedro Barros (BRA)	84.66	Ronnie Sandoval (USA)	82.00
Women's Skateboard Street	Alexis Sablone (USA)	92.00	Pamela Rosa (BRA)	86.00	Vanessa Torres (USA)	78.00
Monster Energy Men's Skateboard Street	Nyjah Huston (USA)	94.00	Chaz Ortiz (USA)	83.00	Ryan Sheckler (USA)	82.00
Skateboard Street Amateurs	Tyson Bowerbank (USA)	88.00	Alex Midler (USA)	86.00	Dustin Blauvelt (USA)	83.66
Skateboard/BMX Big Air Doubles	Morgan Wade (USA); Bob Burnquist (BRA)	90.00	Steve McCann (AUS); Elliot Sloan (USA)	80.00	Zack Warden (USA); Tom Schaar (USA)	70.00

=== BMX ===
Event	Gold		Silver		Bronze	
BMX Vert	Vince Byron (AUS)	92.00	Jamie Bestwick (GBR)	91.00	Simon Tabron (GBR)	89.66
BMX Park	Daniel Sandoval (USA)	92.66	Dennis Enarson (USA)	92.00	Scotty Cranmer (USA)	89.66
BMX Dirt	Kyle Baldock (AUS)	90.00	Mike Clark (USA)	89.00	Chris Doyle (USA)	89.00
Go Pro BMX Big Air	Colton Satterfield (USA)	90.33	Morgan Wade (USA)	89.66	Mykel Larrin (USA)	88.00
Skateboard/BMX Big Air Double	Morgan Wade (USA); Bob Burnquist (BRA)	90.00	Steve McCann (AUS); Elliot Sloan (USA)	80.00	Zack Warden (USA); Tom Schaar (USA)	70.00

=== Rallycross & Off-Road Truck ===
Event	Gold		Silver		Bronze	
Off-Road Truck Racing	Sheldon Creed (USA)	8:11.923	Robby Gordon (USA)	8:15.141	Arie Luyendyk Jr. (USA)	7:57.705
Rallycross	Scott Speed (USA)	6:20.843	Steve Arpin (CAN)	6:21.810	Sebastian Eriksson (SWE)	6:29.099

=== Medal table ===
Rank	Nation	Gold	Silver	Bronze	Total
1	United States	13	12	15	40
2	Australia	3	2	1	6
3	Brazil	2	2	0	4
4	Canada	1	1	0	2
5	France	1	0	0	1
5	Spain	1	0	0	1
7	Great Britain	0	2	2	4
8	Czech Republic	0	1	0	1
8	Italy	0	1	0	1
8	New Zealand	0	1	0	1
8	Puerto Rico	0	1	0	1
12	Sweden	0	0	1	1
Totals (12 entries)		21	23	19	63

== Highlights ==
Even though he didn't medal in the event, Skateboarder Rony Gomes performed the first frontside 360 ollie in Skateboard Big Air history. Skateboarder Bob Burnquist wins his 8th Skateboard Big Air gold medal, the most all-time of any skateboarder in this event. Burnquist is also the most decorated skateboarder with 28 X Games gold medals. BMXer Colton Satterfield made history when he landed a double flair in BMX Big Air.
