= Tadeusz Błażusiak =

Polish motorcycle rider

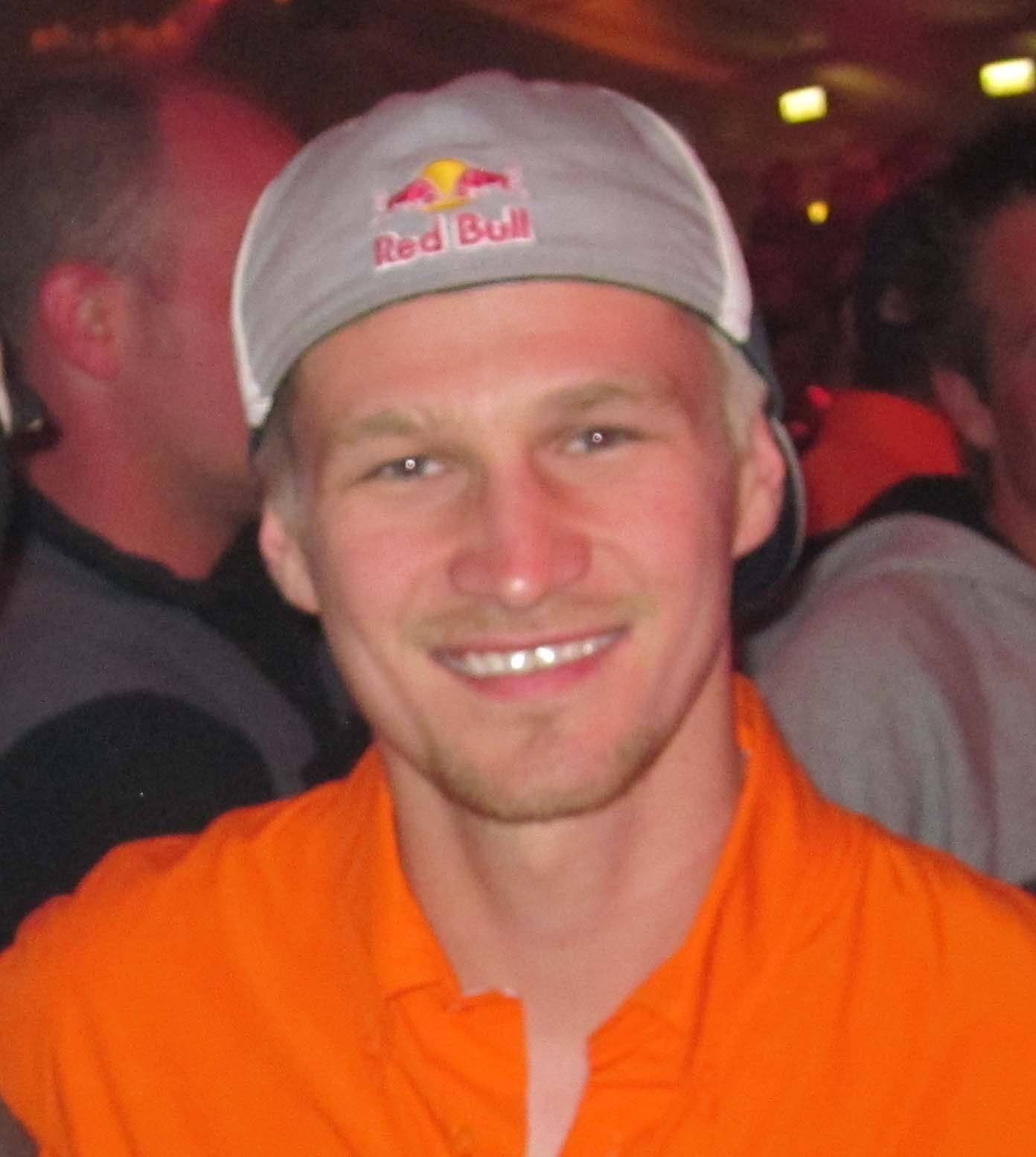

Medal record

Representing Poland

Summer X Games
Gold medal – first place	2011 Los Angeles	Moto X Enduro
Gold medal – first place	2013 Foz do Iguaçu	Moto X Enduro
Gold medal – first place	2013 Los Angeles	Moto X Enduro
Gold medal – first place	2014 Austin	Moto X Enduro
Bronze medal – third place	2013 Munich	Moto X Enduro

Tadeusz Błażusiak, also known as Taddy Blazusiak (born 26 April 1983 in Nowy Targ, Poland) is a Polish motorcycle rider who has won professional titles in trial, enduro and endurocross. He won the Erzberg Rodeo, an annual Austrian extreme enduro event, five times; the FIM Indoor Enduro World Cup six times; and the AMA EnduroCross Championship five times.

== Racing career ==
Błażusiak won the Polish Trial Championship from 1999-2003 and 2005-2007, the German Trial Championship in 2003 and 2004, and the European Trial Championship in 2004. He also competed in the FIM Indoor Trial World Championship from 2002 to 2007, with a best result of eighth in 2006, and the FIM Indoor Trial World Championship, ending seventh in 2007 and eighth from 2005-2007.

Błażusiak switched to enduro in 2007 and won the Erzberg Rodeo extreme enduro race for the first time. He then signed with the KTM factory team, claiming four more straight wins at the race from 2008 to 2011. He won the 2007 Last Man Standing in Bulcher, Texas; earned second at the 2008 The Tough One and first in 2009; and won the Hell's Gate in 2008 and 2009.

Also in 2007, Błażusiak began his career in endurocross with KTM. He was runner-up at the 2007-2008 FIM Indoor Enduro World Cup with a best result of second in Germany. In 2008-2009, he collected three wins and six podiums, ending runner-up again. Błażusiak dominated the 2009-2010 season, claiming the title with ten wins and second-place finishes in the remaining two races. He won four out of the six races in 2010-2011, claiming his second title. Błażusiak won all his races except one in 2011-2012 and won the championship. In 2012-2013 he won four times and ended in the podium in all races, collecting his fourth straight title. He won the FIM SuperEnduro World Championship again in 2013-14 and 2014–15, completing six consecutive titles.

Błażusiak won the Las Vegas round of the 2007 AMA EnduroCross Championship. In 2008 he entered the full season, resulting third in points with two wins in six races. The rider collected four wins and a second in the 2009 season, claiming his first title. He won five races out of six in the 2010 AMA EnduroCross, defending the championship. Błażusiak won the eight rounds in 2011 and seven out of nine in 2012, thus winning his third and fourth championships. In 2013, he collected two wins, four podiums and top-fives in the seven rounds, after which he won the championship for the fifth time.

In addition to the FIM Indoor Enduro World Cup and AMA EnduroCross, Błażusiak won the gold medal at the debut of endurocross at the X Games during the 2011 event in Los Angeles. He then won two gold medals at the 2013 X Games in Foz de Iguaçu and Los Angeles, and a bronze medal in Munich. The following year, he once again won the gold medal in enduroX at the X Games in Austin, bringing his total X Games medal count to four gold and one bronze. Błażusiak signed up with GASGAS for the 2021 race season.
