= X Games Austin 2016 =

2016 extreme sports tournament

- Venue: Circuit of the Americas
- Location: Austin, Texas
- Date: June 2–5

X Games Austin 2016 was an action sporting event that took place June 2–5, 2016, at the Circuit of the Americas in Austin, Texas.

The 2016 Summer X Games would be the third event in a row to be held in Austin and the fourth full X Games event to be held in the state of Texas; in 2003, a special "Global Championships" event was held in San Antonio, Texas.

The 2016 X Games was broadcast again on ESPN and ABC. The event would have the return of BMX Street, Moto X Best Trick, Moto X Freestyle and Women's Skateboard Park competition. This was the last time that the X Games would be hosted at Circuit of the Americas citing the weather and finances as the reasons why the X Games would not return.

== Results ==
=== Flat Track ===
Event	Gold		Silver		Bronze	
X Games Harley-Davidson Flat-Track Racing	Jared Mees (USA)	6:35.907	Kenny Coolbeth Jr. (USA)	6:36.276	Brad Baker (USA)	6:40.896

=== Moto X ===
Event	Gold		Silver		Bronze	
Monster Energy Moto X Best Trick	Jackson Strong (AUS)	94.00	Josh Sheehan (AUS)	89.66	Clinton Moore (AUS)	89.33
Coors Light Moto X Freestyle	Josh Sheehan (AUS)	93.33	Rob Adelberg (AUS)	91.66	Clinton Moore (AUS)	91.00
Moto X Best Whip	Jarryd McNeil (AUS)	39.00	Axell Hodges (USA)	20.00	Edgar Torronteras (ESP)	16.00
LifeProof Moto X Step Up	Libor Podmol (CZE); Jarryd McNeil (AUS)	108'3"			Massimo Bianconcini (ITA)	105'0"
Fruit of the Loom QuarterPipe	Tom Pagès (FRA)	94.66	Josh Sheehan (AUS)	85.00	Clinton Moore (AUS)	84.33

=== Skateboarding ===
Event	Gold		Silver		Bronze	
Skateboard Vert	Sam Beckett (GBR)	89.33	Moto Shibata (JPN)	88.66	Jimmy Wilkins (USA)	86.00
America's Navy Skateboard Big Air	Jake Brown (AUS)	77.33	Evan Doherty (USA)	69.66	Leo Ruiz (BRA)	65.66
Toyota Men's Skateboard Park	Pedro Barros (BRA)	90.33	Curren Caples (USA)	87.66	Chris Russell (USA)	83.33
Women's Skateboard Park	Kisa Nakamura (JPN)	84.33	Lizzie Armanto (USA)	82.66	Jordyn Barratt (USA)	78.00
Women's Skateboard Street	Pamela Rosa (BRA)	84.33	Mariah Duran (USA)	78.00	Lacey Baker (USA)	77.33
Monster Energy Men's Skateboard Street	Ryan Decenzo (CAN)	87.33	Nyjah Huston (USA)	87.00	Ishod Wair (USA)	86.66
Skateboard Street Amateurs	Tyson Bowerbank (USA)	89.66	Christian Dufrene (USA)	88.00	Jagger Eaton (USA)	86.66
Real Street	Chris Joslin (USA)	20.35	Torey Pudwill (USA)	16.62	Zack Wallin (USA)	3.35

=== BMX ===
Event	Gold		Silver		Bronze	
BMX Vert	Jamie Bestwick (GBR)	90.66	Simon Tabron (GBR)	86.00	Dennis McCoy (USA)	84.00
Toyota BMX Park	Dennis Enarson (USA)	70.00	Logan Martin (AUS)	64.00	Kyle Baldock (AUS)	63.00
Intel BMX Dirt	Kevin Peraza (USA)	88.00	Ben Wallace (GBR)	81.00	James Foster (GBR)	73.00
BMX Street	Garrett Reynolds (USA)	76.00	Sean Ricany (USA)	65.00	Broc Raiford (USA)	63.00
Dave Mirra's BMX Park Best Trick	Kyle Baldock (AUS)					

=== Medal table ===
Rank	Nation	Gold	Silver	Bronze	Total
1	United States	6	10	10	26
2	Australia	6	4	4	14
3	Great Britain	2	2	1	5
4	Brazil	2	0	1	3
5	Japan	1	1	0	2
6	Canada	1	0	0	1
6	Czech Republic	1	0	0	1
6	France	1	0	0	1
9	Italy	0	0	1	1
9	Spain	0	0	1	1
Totals (10 entries)		20	17	18	55
