= Jamie Bestwick =

British BMX rider

- Born: 8 July 1971 (age 55); Nottingham, England
- Other names: Burger and Burkey
- Spouse: Kerry Bestwick (m. 1999)
- Children: 1
- Cycling career
- Height: 6 ft 1 in (185 cm)
- Weight: 175 lb (79 kg)
- Sport: Cycling

Summer X Games medal record

Representing United Kingdom
Gold medal – first place	2016 Austin	BMX Vert
Gold medal – first place	2014 Austin	BMX Vert
Gold medal – first place	2013 Barcelona	BMX Vert
Gold medal – first place	2013 Foz do Iguaçu	BMX Vert
Gold medal – first place	2012 Los Angeles	BMX Vert
Gold medal – first place	2011 Los Angeles	BMX Vert
Gold medal – first place	2010 Los Angeles	BMX Vert
Gold medal – first place	2009 Los Angeles	BMX Vert
Gold medal – first place	2008 Los Angeles	BMX Vert
Gold medal – first place	2007 Los Angeles	BMX Vert
Gold medal – first place	2005 Los Angeles	BMX Vert
Gold medal – first place	2005 Los Angeles	BMX Vert Best Trick
Gold medal – first place	2003 Los Angeles	BMX Vert
Gold medal – first place	2000 San Francisco	BMX Vert
Silver medal – second place	2018 Minneapolis	BMX Vert
Silver medal – second place	2019 Minneapolis	BMX Vert
Silver medal – second place	2017 Minneapolis	BMX Vert
Silver medal – second place	2015 Austin	BMX Vert
Silver medal – second place	2006 Los Angeles	BMX Vert
Bronze medal – third place	1996 Newport	BMX Vert

Gravity Games
Gold medal – first place	1999 Providence	BMX Vert
Gold medal – first place	2001 Providence	BMX Vert
Silver medal – second place	2000 Providence	BMX Vert

Jamie Bestwick (born 8 July 1971) is a British BMX rider. He won 13 gold medals in the BMX Vert event at the X Games, and one gold medal for Vert Best Trick.

Bestwick started riding BMX with his friends at ten years old. Jamie only competed in BMX events for fun. Riding his bike was just a way to hang out with his friends. After he finished school, his first priority was working as an engineer for Rolls-Royce in England and he thought that was going to be his career. However, he decided to quit his job and become a professional BMX rider.

Bestwick competed in his first X Games in 1996. He ended Dave Mirra's BMX three-year Vert reign in 2000, taking home the gold. He gradually became unbeatable. He won every single competition he entered in 2005. He won silver at X Games 2015, losing after winning nine years in a row

Bestwick has also won a Laureus World Sports Award for Action Sportsperson of the Year and been nominated for a Best Male Action Sports Athlete ESPY Award. In 2014, Bestwick spoke at Yale University alongside Ken Hill, Scott Russell, and Nick Ienatsch about motorcycle racing and success. In 2006 he performed in Cirque Rocks a charity circus held in New Zealand.

Bestwick acted as coach to Charlotte Worthington when she won the gold medal at the 2020 Summer Olympics and Declan Brooks when he won Bronze Medal at the 2020 Summer Olympics.

== X Games competition history ==
GOLD (14) SILVER (5) BRONZE (1)
YEAR	X GAMES	EVENTS	RANK	MEDAL
1996	Summer X Games II	BMX Vert	3rd	Bronze medal
1997	Summer X Games III	BMX Vert	4th	
1998	Summer X Games IV	BMX Vert	5th	
1999	Summer X Games V	BMX Vert	6th	
2000	Summer X Games VI	BMX Vert	1st	Gold medal
2003	Summer X Games IX	BMX Vert	1st	Gold medal
2004	Summer X Games X	BMX Vert	6th	
2005	Summer X Games XI	BMX Vert	1st	Gold medal
2005	Summer X Games XI	BMX Vert Best Trick	1st	Gold medal
2006	Summer X Games XII	BMX Vert	2nd	Silver medal
2006	Summer X Games XII	BMX Vert Best Trick	7th	
2007	Summer X Games XIII	BMX Vert	1st	Gold medal
2008	Summer X Games XIV	BMX Vert	1st	Gold medal
2009	Summer X Games XV	BMX Vert	1st	Gold medal
2010	Summer X Games XVI	BMX Vert	1st	Gold medal
2011	Summer X Games XVII	BMX Vert	1st	Gold medal
2012	Summer X Games XVIII	BMX Vert	1st	Gold medal
2013	X Games Foz do Iguaçu 2013	BMX Vert	1st	Gold medal
2013	X Games Barcelona 2013	BMX Vert	1st	Gold medal
2014	X Games Austin 2014	BMX Vert	1st	Gold medal
2015	X Games Austin 2015	BMX Vert	2nd	Silver medal
2016	X Games Austin 2016	BMX Vert	1st	Gold medal
2017	X Games Minneapolis 2017	BMX Vert	2nd	Silver medal
2018	X Games Minneapolis 2018	BMX Vert	2nd	Silver medal
2019	X Games Minneapolis 2019	BMX Vert	2nd	Silver medal
