= Gravity Games Bike: Street Vert Dirt =

2002 video game

- Developer: Midway Studios San Diego
- Publisher: Midway Games (Note: Released under the Midway Sports Asylum publishing label.)
- Programmers: Detmar Petereke; Daniel Chambers; Rachid El Guerrab; Randy Johns; Gary Kroll; Jeff MacArthur
- Composer: Aubrey Hodges
- Platforms: PlayStation 2, Xbox
- Release: NA: June 27, 2002 (PS2); NA: September 4, 2002 (Xbox); EU: September 27, 2002
- Genre: Sports
- Modes: Single-player, multiplayer

Gravity Games Bike: Street Vert Dirt is a sports video game developed and published by Midway for the PlayStation 2 and Xbox. It was released in North America on June 27, 2002 for the PlayStation 2 and on September 4, 2002 for the Xbox. It was the only game released under the Gravity Games license by Midway.

The game garnered mostly negative reception from critics. Reviewers criticized the game's broken gameplay, graphical glitches and collision detection problems. Some critics, however, praised the game's large level designs.

== Gameplay ==
The player grinds on a rail

Gravity Games Bike is a BMX video game and features gameplay similar to that of the Dave Mirra Freestyle BMX games. It features 21 characters and 10 levels. The player controls a BMX biker and is required to complete various goals within levels to unlock later courses. As the player performs tricks, they gain more points and fulfill requirements in the game. The control scheme is similar to that of the Dave Mirra games in that one button on the controller is used to perform tricks and another is used to modify the trick once it is performed. Unlike other similar games, Gravity Games Bike rewards the same number of points for performing the same trick repeatedly. The game has several different multiplayer modes.

=== Riders ===
- Jamie Bestwick
- Dennis McCoy
- Tim "Fuzzy" Hall
- Andre Ellison
- Leigh Ramsdell
- Reuel Erickson
- Matt Beringer

== Development ==
Midway announced a partnership with EMAP USA on January 18, 2000, giving them the rights to the Gravity Games license. It began development under the title Gravity Games: Bike and was the first game developed under the license. The name of the game changed to Gravity Games Bike: Street Vert Dirt by August 2001, and IGN noted the game's fluid trick system in one of its initial builds. IGN's Douglass C. Perry noted Midway's attention to detailed level design in a preview for the game. IGN's Chris Carle previewed the game at E3 2002 and praised the game's level design but criticized the graphics and the slow-moving pace of the game.

== Reception ==
Reception

Aggregate score
Aggregator	Score	
Aggregator	PS2	Xbox
Metacritic	24/100	15/100

Review scores
Publication	Score	
Publication	PS2	Xbox
Game Informer	2/10	N/A
Gamekult	2/10	N/A
GameSpot	1.7/10	1.4/10
GameSpy	20%	N/A
GameZone	7/10	N/A
IGN	2/10	2/10
Jeuxvideo.com	8/20	N/A
MeriStation	5.5/10	3.8/10
Official U.S. PlayStation Magazine	0.5/5	N/A
X-Play	1/5	N/A

The PlayStation 2 version received "generally unfavorable reviews", while the Xbox version received "overwhelming dislike", according to the review aggregation website Metacritic. The game was notable for its negative reception.

GameSpy's Miguel Lopez criticized the PlayStation 2 version's unresponsive controls, collision detection, and sound design, stating "... Dirt has ...a propensity to live up to its name." IGN's Chris Roper compared it unfavorably to E.T. the Extra-Terrestrial for the Atari 2600, which is often considered one of the worst games of all time. Roper noted that the game was full of glitches and had an unresponsive control scheme. GameSpot's Jeff Gerstmann called the gameplay "broken" and the game itself "unfinished". GameZone's Natalie Romano praised the PS2 version's sound selection, level size and character variety, while calling the control scheme "one of the game's major weaknesses." Gerstmann criticized the Xbox version for its glitches and control issues, and wrote, "Wasn't it canceled?"

The GameCube version was canceled due to lower than expected sales for all Midway games, though Gerstmann attributed the cancellation to its negative reception.

The game won the awards for "Worst Game of the Year on PlayStation 2" and "Worst Game of the Year on Xbox" at GameSpot's Best and Worst of 2002 Awards.
