= Texas's 66th House of Representatives district =

American legislative district

Texas's 66th State House of Representatives district
Representative
Matt Shaheen; R–Plano
- Demographics: 55.3% White; 10.0% Black; 12.5% Hispanic; 20.4% Asian
- Population (2020) • Voting age: 198,718; 149,863

The Texas House of Representatives' 66th district represents a portion of Collin County, including parts of Plano and Dallas. The current representative of this district is Matt Shaheen, a Republican from Plano who has represented the district since 2015.

Upon being moved to Collin County in 1993, district 66 became a suburban Republican stronghold; recently however, the district has become increasingly competitive, with Democrats coming within 1 percentage point of flipping the district in both 2018 and 2020.

As a result of the 2021 redistricting, the district will represent parts of Frisco, Plano, Prosper, and Celina.

== Statewide election results ==
Election results from recent statewide races:

District 66 vote by party in presidential elections
Year	Democratic	Republican	Third parties
2020	53.73% 47,844	44.62% 39,729	1.65% 1,471

District 66 vote by party in Class I Senate elections
Year	Democratic	Republican	Third parties
2018	52.51% 36,769	46.79% 32,760	0.70% 488

District 66 vote by party in Class II Senate elections
Year	Democratic	Republican	Third parties
2020	48.89% 42,688	48.99% 42,768	2.12% 1,852

District 66 vote by party in gubernatorial elections
Year	Democratic	Republican	Third parties
2018	44.17% 30,668	54.01% 37,504	1.82% 1,262

== List of representatives ==
Legislature	Representative	Party	Term start	Term end	Counties represented
3rd	Hamilton P. Bee	Unknown	1849	1851	Webb
4th	Hamilton P. Bee	Unknown	1851	1853	Webb
5th	Hamilton P. Bee	Unknown	1853	1855	Webb
6th	Hamilton P. Bee	Unknown	1855	1857	Webb
7th	Hamilton P. Bee	Unknown	1857	1859	Webb
8th	Bacilio Benavides	Unknown	1859	1861	Webb
9th	John Staehely	Unknown	1861	1862	Comal
10th	Herman Seele	Unknown	1863	1866	Comal
11th	Daniel Murchison	Unknown	1866	1870	Comal
12th-14th	District inactive		1870	1876	
15th	James Monroe Swisher	Republican	1876	1879	Blanco, Travis
16th	James T.W. Loe	Greenback	1879	1881	Blanco, Travis
17th	Albert W.H. Moursund	Democratic	1881	1883	Blanco, Travis
18th	Albert W.H. Moursund	Democratic	1883	1885	Brazoria, Galveston, Matagorda, Wharton
19th	James Knox White	Democratic	1885	1887	Brazoria, Galveston, Matagorda, Wharton
20th	Charles Irvin Battle	Democratic	1887	1889	Brazoria, Galveston, Matagorda, Wharton
21st	Richard H.D. Sorrell II	Democratic	1889	1891	Brazoria, Galveston, Matagorda, Wharton
22nd	Green Cameron Duncan	Democratic	1891	1893	Brazoria, Galveston, Matagorda, Wharton
23rd	Robert Henry Rogers	Democratic	1893	1893	McLennan
23rd	Seth Phineas Mills	Democratic	1893	1895	McLennan
24th	Seth Phineas Mills	Democratic	1895	1897	McLennan
24th	Cullen Thomas	Democratic	1895	1897	McLennan
25th	Albert Sidney Bird	Democratic	1897	1899	McLennan
25th	James Sluder	Democratic	1897	1899	McLennan
26th	Pat Morriss Neff	Democratic	1899	1901	McLennan
27th	Pat Morriss Neff	Democratic	1901	1903	McLennan
27th	Henry B. Terrell	Democratic	1901	1903	McLennan
28th	Edward Flynn English	Democratic	1903	1905	Milam, Robertson
29th	James Joseph Elliott	Democratic	1905	1907	Milam, Robertson
30th	Clifford Braly	Democratic	1907	1909	Milam, Robertson
31st	Richard Boswell	Democratic	1909	1911	Milam, Robertson
32nd	LeRoy Hamilton Hillyer	Democratic	1911	1913	Milam, Robertson
33rd	William Riley Butler	Democratic	1913	1915	Bell
34th	William Riley Butler	Democratic	1915	1917	Bell
35th	William Riley Butler	Democratic	1917	1919	Bell
36th	Charles William Barrett	Democratic	1919	1921	Bell
37th	Charles William Barrett	Democratic	1921	1923	Bell
38th	John H. Wessles	Republican	1923	1925	Fayette
39th	James Pavlica	Democratic	1925	1926	Fayette
40th	James Pavlica	Democratic	1927	1929	Fayette
41st	James Pavlica	Democratic	1929	1931	Fayette
42nd	Gus Herzik	Democratic	1931	1933	Fayette
43rd	James Pavlica	Democratic	1933	1935	Fayette
44th	Gus Herzik	Democratic	1935	1937	Fayette
45th	Gus Herzik	Democratic	1937	1939	Fayette
46th	John Abness Kerr	Democratic	1939	1941	Fayette
47th	Rudolph B. Spacek	Democratic	1941	1943	Fayette
48th	Rudolph B. Spacek	Democratic	1941	1943	Fayette
49th	Rudolph B. Spacek	Democratic	1943	1945	Fayette
50th	Rudolph B. Spacek	Democratic	1945	1947	Fayette
51st	Rudolph B. Spacek	Democratic	1949	1951	Fayette
52nd	Rudolph B. Spacek	Democratic	1951	1953	Fayette
53rd	Max Carlton Smith	Democratic	1953	1955	Blanco, Caldwell, Hays
54th	Max Carlton Smith	Democratic	1955	1957	Blanco, Caldwell, Hays
55th	Max Carlton Smith	Democratic	1957	1959	Blanco, Caldwell, Hays
56th	Max Carlton Smith	Democratic	1959	1961	Blanco, Caldwell, Hays
57th	Henry Arnold Fletcher	Democratic	1961	1963	Blanco, Caldwell, Hays
58th	James E. Nugent	Democratic	1963	1965	Bandera, Concho, Crockett, Edwards, Kerr, Kimble, Mason, Menard, Real, Schleicher, Sutton
59th	James E. Nugent	Democratic	1965	1967	Bandera, Concho, Crockett, Edwards, Kerr, Kimble, Mason, Menard, Real, Schleicher, Sutton
60th	Gene Hendryx	Democratic	1967	1969	Brewster, Coke, Crane, Glasscock, Irion, Jeff Davis, Pecos, Presidio, Reagan, Sterling, Terrell, Upton, Ward
61st	George Baker	Democratic	1969	1971	Brewster, Coke, Crane, Glasscock, Irion, Jeff Davis, Pecos, Presidio, Reagan, Sterling, Terrell, Upton, Ward
62nd	George Baker	Democratic	1971	1973	Brewster, Coke, Crane, Glasscock, Irion, Jeff Davis, Pecos, Presidio, Reagan, Sterling, Terrell, Upton, Ward
63rd	Phil Cates	Democratic	1973	1975	Armstrong, Briscoe, Childress, Collingsworth, Donley, Floyd, Gray, Hall, Motley, Wheeler
64th	Phil Cates	Democratic	1975	1977	Armstrong, Briscoe, Childress, Collingsworth, Donley, Floyd, Gray, Hall, Motley, Wheeler
65th	Phil Cates	Democratic	1977	1979	Armstrong, Briscoe, Childress, Collingsworth, Donley, Floyd, Gray, Hall, Motley, Wheeler
66th	Foster Whaley	Democratic	1979	1981	Armstrong, Briscoe, Childress, Collingsworth, Donley, Floyd, Gray, Hall, Motley, Wheeler
67th	Foster Whaley	Democratic	1981	1983	Armstrong, Briscoe, Childress, Collingsworth, Donley, Floyd, Gray, Hall, Motley, Wheeler
68th	Dick Burnett	Democratic	1983	1985	Coke, Mitchell, Tom Green, Sterling
69th	Dick Burnett	Democratic	1985	1987	Coke, Mitchell, Tom Green, Sterling
70th	Dick Burnett	Democratic	1987	1989	Coke, Mitchell, Tom Green, Sterling
71st	Robert Junell	Democratic	1989	1991	Coke, Mitchell, Tom Green, Sterling
72nd	Robert Junell	Democratic	1991	1993	Coke, Mitchell, Tom Green, Sterling
73rd	Brian McCall	Republican	1993	1995	Collin (part)
74th	Brian McCall	Republican	1995	1997	Collin (part)
75th	Brian McCall	Republican	1997	1999	Collin (part)
76th	Brian McCall	Republican	1999	2001	Collin (part)
77th	Brian McCall	Republican	2001	2003	Collin (part)
78th	Brian McCall	Republican	2003	2005	Collin (part)
79th	Brian McCall	Republican	2005	2007	Collin (part)
80th	Brian McCall	Republican	2007	2009	Collin (part)
81st	Brian McCall	Republican	2009	2010	Collin (part)
81st	Van Taylor	Republican	2010	2011	Collin (part)
82nd	Van Taylor	Republican	2011	2013	Collin (part)
83rd	Van Taylor	Republican	2013	2015	Collin (part)
84th	Matt Shaheen	Republican	2015	2017	Collin (part)
85th	Matt Shaheen	Republican	2017	2019	Collin (part)
86th	Matt Shaheen	Republican	2019	2021	Collin (part)
87th	Matt Shaheen	Republican	2021	2023	Collin (part)
88th	Matt Shaheen	Republican	2023	2025	Collin (part)
89th	Matt Shaheen	Republican	2025	2027	Collin (part)
90th	TBD	TBD	2027	2029	Collin (part)

== Recent election results ==
Texas House of Representatives, District 66, 2014
Party	Candidate	Votes	%
Republican	Matt Shaheen	24,631	100.00
Total votes		24,631	100.00
Republican hold			

Texas House of Representatives, District 66, 2016
Party	Candidate	Votes	%
Republican	Matt Shaheen	40,368	57.39
Democratic	Gnanse Nelson	27,240	38.73
Libertarian	Shawn W. Jones	2,726	3.88
Total votes		70,334	100.00
Republican hold			

Texas House of Representatives, District 66, 2018
Party	Candidate	Votes	%
Republican	Matt Shaheen	34,382	50.29
Democratic	Sharon Hirsch	33,991	49.71
Total votes		68,373	100.00
Republican hold			

Texas House of Representatives, District 66, 2020
Party	Candidate	Votes	%
Republican	Matt Shaheen	42,728	49.56
Democratic	Sharon Hirsch	41,879	48.58
Libertarian	Shawn W. Jones	1,600	1.86
Total votes		86,207	100.00
Republican hold			
