= Morgan Wade (BMX rider) =

American bicycle motocross rider

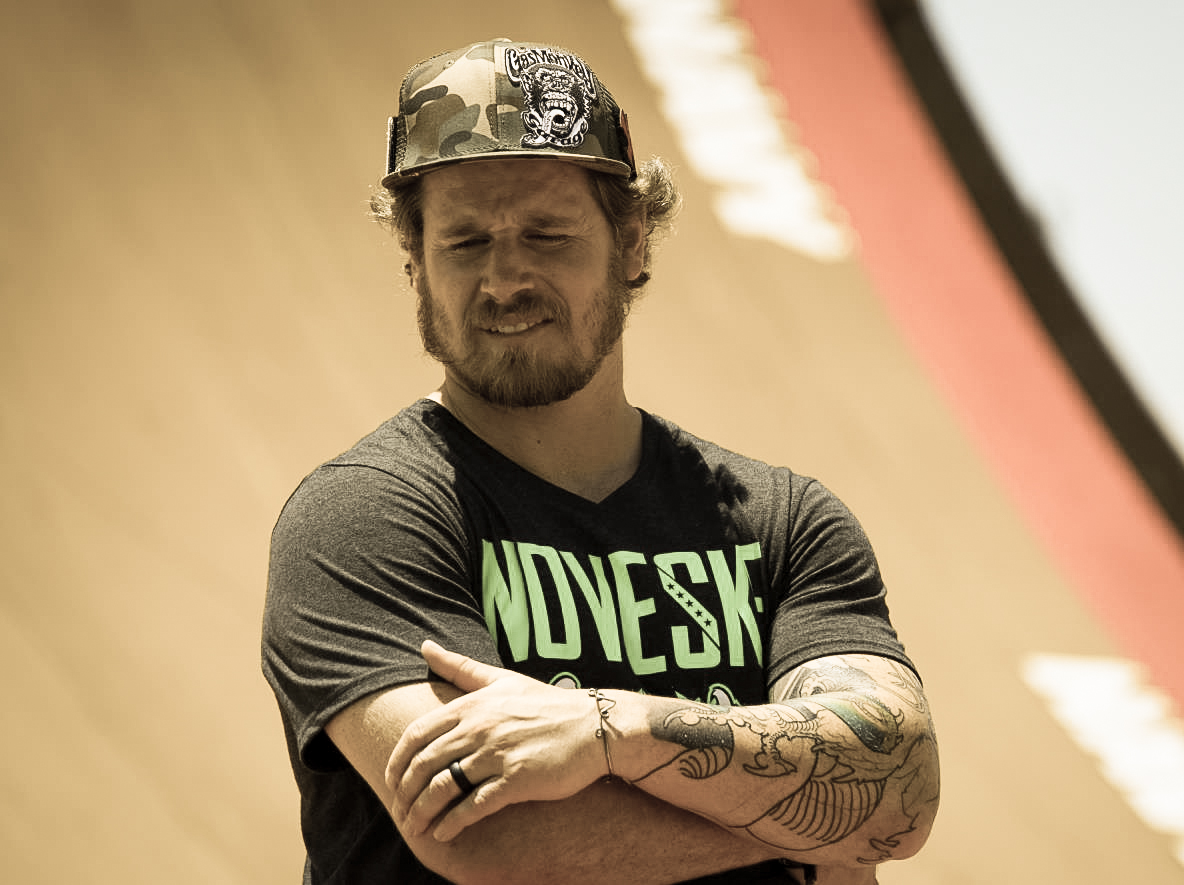

Personal information
- Full name: Morgan Patrick Wade
- Born: July 13, 1983 (age 42) Tyler, Texas, U.S.
- Occupation: BMX Rider
- Years active: 1995–Present
- Agent: Spencer Bass at XSM Global, LLC
- Spouse: Natalie Wade

Sport
- Country: United States
- Sport: Freestyle BMX
- Turned pro: 2001
Medal record
Summer X Games
Gold medal – first place	2013 Los Angeles	BMX Freestyle Big Air
Gold medal – first place	2015 Austin	Big Air Doubles
Silver medal – second place	2006 Los Angeles	BMX Freestyle Park
Silver medal – second place	2013 Munich	BMX Freestyle Big Air
Silver medal – second place	2014 Austin	BMX Freestyle Big Air
Silver medal – second place	2015 Austin	BMX Freestyle Big Air
Silver medal – second place	2018 Minneapolis	BMX Freestyle Big Air
Silver medal – second place	2019 Minneapolis	BMX Freestyle Big Air
Bronze medal – third place	2013 Foz do Iguaçu	BMX Freestyle Big Air

Morgan Wade (born July 13, 1983) is an American professional BMX rider from Tyler, Texas. He is best known for competing in the X Games.

Wade competed in the 2006 and 2007 X Games in the Freestyle and Big Air competitions. He won gold in 2013 X Games Los Angeles for Big Air BMX.

Wade once appeared on the MTV show Scarred. He appeared in the video section of Ride BMX's Drop The Hammer, in which he looped the Mt. Baldy fullpipe. Wade gained a reputation for his toughness as he has been in some major on tour accidents, including getting teeth knocked out, but continued to perform at a high level on the tour.

Wade resides in Tyler, Texas and is married to Natalie Wade, a native of Arizona.
