= AMA EnduroCross Championship =

Indoor motorcycle racing series

The AMA EnduroCross Championship is an endurocross championship held in North America since 2007. It is held in stadiums or arenas, recreating enduro obstacles such as rocks, boulders and logs.

Motorsport promoters Eric Peronnard and Tim Clark organized the first EnduroCross event at the Orleans Arena in Las Vegas in 2004, with a similar format to the Barcelona Indoor Enduro. In 2007, EnduroCross turned into a three-round championship with AMA sanctioning. Since 2008, at least six rounds have been held each year. In 2011 and 2012, the X Games Los Angeles was a points-scoring round of the AMA EnduroCross.

Las Vegas has hosted the final round from 2007 to 2013, and the first round from 2008 to 2010 and since 2012. Cities that have hosted the AMA EnduroCross include Denver, Everett, Boise and Ontario. Most of the events have been held in the West.

In 2006, the owners sold EnduroCross to Primedia, later Source Interlink and TEN: The Enthusiast Network. In 2017, TEN sold the series to the Bonnier Motorcycle Group.

Taddy Blazusiak holds the record of main event wins in EnduroCross with 29 as of the 2013 season. No other rider has collected five main event wins. Geoff Aaron has collected 15 podiums, Mike Brown 13, Cody Webb 12, Colton Haaker 9 and Damon Huffman 9, all of which have also won main events.

== Champions ==
Year	Rider	Motorcycle	Ref.
2004	Ryan Hughes	Honda	
2005	David Knight	KTM	
2006	John Dowd	Suzuki	
2007	David Knight	KTM	
2008	Ricky Dietrich	Kawasaki	
2009	Taddy Blazusiak	KTM	
2010	Taddy Blazusiak	KTM	
2011	Taddy Blazusiak	KTM	
2012	Taddy Blazusiak	KTM	
2013	Taddy Blazusiak	KTM	
2014	Cody Webb	Beta	
2015	Cody Webb	KTM	
2016	Colton Haaker	Husqvarna	
2017	Cody Webb	KTM	
2018	Colton Haaker	Husqvarna	
2019	Colton Haaker	Husqvarna	
2020	Colton Haaker	Husqvarna	
2021	Colton Haaker	Husqvarna	
2022	Jonny Walker	Beta	
2023	Trystan Hart	KTM	
2024	Trystan Hart	KTM	
2025	Jonny Walker	Triumph	
