= Eric Peronnard =

Eric Peronnard is a French-born American creator and promoter of US Open, Minimoto and Endurocross. In 2011, the Endurocross was introduced to the X Games.
