= Tarah Gieger =

Puerto Rico motorcycle racer

Tarah Gieger Wygle
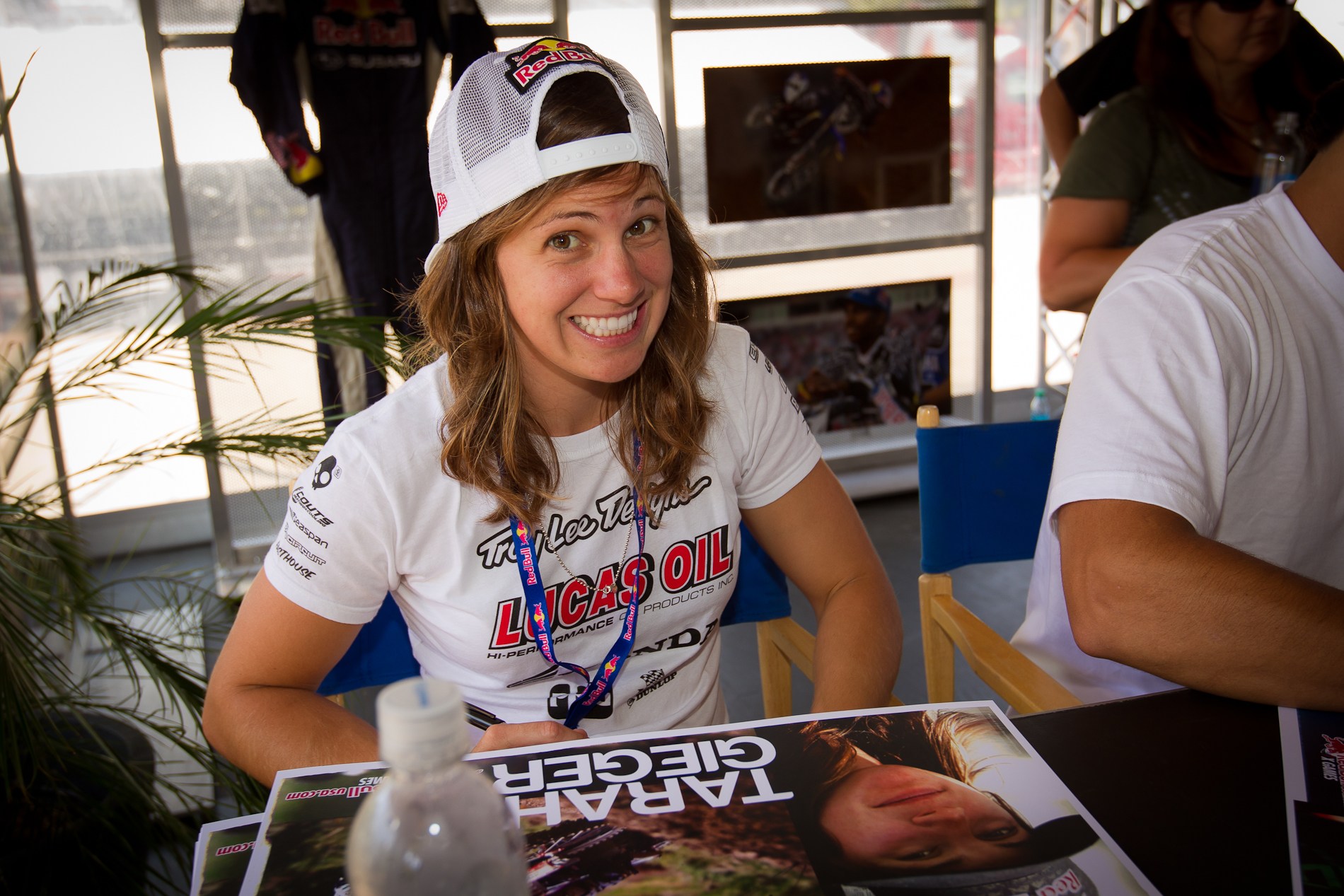
- Gieger in 2011

Personal information
- Born: September 18, 1985 (age 41) Aguadilla, Puerto Rico
- Height: 5 ft 6 in (168 cm)
- Weight: 135 lb (61 kg)

Sport
- Country: Puerto Rico
- Sport: Motocross
Medal record
Summer X Games
Gold medal – first place	2008 Los Angeles	Supermotocross
Silver medal – second place	2010 Los Angeles	Supermotocross
Silver medal – second place	2011 Los Angeles	Supermotocross
Silver medal – second place	2011 Los Angeles	Enduro X
Silver medal – second place	2012 Los Angeles	Moto X Racing
Bronze medal – third place	2013 Foz do Iguaçu	Enduro X
Bronze medal – third place	2013 Los Angeles	Enduro X

Tarah Gieger (born September 18, 1985) is a Puerto Rican female professional motocross racer.

== Early years ==
Gieger's parents moved to Puerto Rico from Florida, where they established a surf shop. Gieger was born in Aguadilla, Puerto Rico. She began practicing surfing, but switched to motorcycles when she was ten years old. She began riding them in the mountains of San Sebastián where crowds gather to practice.

== Professional career ==
In 2003, Gieger began racing professionally. Gieger won Loretta Lynn AMA Amateur National Motocross Championship titles in 2004, 2006, and 2007. Also in 2007, she became the first female racer ever to compete in the Motocross des Nations. In 2008, Gieger won the first women's supercross event at the X Games XIV.

The following year, a broken wrist prevented Gieger from being among the medalists of the X Games. In March 2010, she joined the Troy Lee Design/Lucas Oil/Honda motocross racing team. After that, she won the silver medal at the women's supercross event at the X Games for two years in a row (2010 and 2011).

In 2013, Gieger finished fourth in the Ford Women's Enduro X Final at the X Games Barcelona. That same year, she was photographed nude for ESPN:The Magazine "Bodies We Want" photo shoot.

Gieger is the most decorated female athlete in X Games history.

== Personal life ==
Gieger married fellow Nitro Circus member Dusty Wygle on March 10, 2017. They have a son.

== See also ==
- List of Puerto Ricans
