= Dennis McCoy (BMX rider) =

American bicycle motocross rider

Personal information
- Nicknames: DMC, The Real McCoy
- Born: December 29, 1966 (age 59) Kansas City, Missouri, U.S.
- Height: 5 ft 7 in (170 cm)
- Weight: 150 lb (68 kg)

Cycling career
- Sport: Cycling
- Discipline: BMX
- Role: Freestyle rider
- Rider type: Flatland, Vert, Street

Professional team
- 1984: Haro, Mongoose
Medal record
Representing United States
Summer X Games
Gold medal – first place	1998 San Diego	BMX Vert Doubles
Silver medal – second place	1997 San Diego	BMX Vert
Silver medal – second place	1997 San Diego	BMX Park
Silver medal – second place	1998 San Diego	BMX Vert
Bronze medal – third place	1998 San Diego	BMX Park
Bronze medal – third place	2014 Austin	BMX Vert
Bronze medal – third place	2016 Austin	BMX Vert

Dennis McCoy (born December 29, 1966, in Kansas City, Missouri) is an American freestyle BMX rider. He was a member of the American Freestyle Association along with Mat Hoffman and Dave Mirra and also featured in the 2001 video game Mat Hoffman's Pro BMX as well as the 2002 video game Gravity Games Bike: Street Vert Dirt. Is considered to be a pioneer in freestyle BMX, his credentials include being featured in several Road Fools episodes and managing major action sport competitions and events while still maintaining legendary skill on a BMX bike.

Dennis McCoy received his first sponsorship and turned pro from Bob Haro, of Haro Bicycles in 1984. He also is the longest active competitor in the ESPN X-Games, having been an active competitor since the first event held in Providence, Rhode Island, in 1995 through to the 2018 event in Minneapolis, Minnesota. In the 2013 X-Games of Munich, he was an analytical commentator for the Slopestyle Mountain Bike event.

== X Games competition history ==
GOLD (1) SILVER (3) BRONZE (3)
YEAR	X GAMES	EVENTS	RANK	MEDAL
1995	Extreme Games	BMX Dirt	12th	
1995	Extreme Games	BMX Vert	4th	
1996	Summer X Games II	BMX Street	10th	
1996	Summer X Games II	BMX Vert	12th	
1997	Summer X Games III	BMX Street	2nd	Silver medal
1997	Summer X Games III	BMX Vert	2nd	Silver medal
1998	Summer X Games IV	BMX Street	3rd	Bronze medal
1998	Summer X Games IV	BMX Vert	2nd	Silver medal
1998	Summer X Games IV	BMX Vert Doubles	1st	Gold medal
1999	Summer X Games V	BMX Vert	4th	
2000	Summer X Games VI	BMX Vert	7th	
2001	Summer X Games VII	BMX Park	13th	
2001	Summer X Games VII	BMX Vert	6th	
2002	Summer X Games VIII	BMX Park	15th	
2002	Summer X Games VIII	BMX Vert	9th	
2003	Summer X Games IX	BMX Vert	7th	
2004	Summer X Games X	BMX Vert	5th	
2005	Summer X Games XI	BMX Vert	4th	
2005	Summer X Games XI	BMX Vert Best Trick	7th	
2006	Summer X Games XII	BMX Vert	6th	
2007	Summer X Games XIII	BMX Vert	5th	
2008	Summer X Games XIV	BMX Vert	4th	
2009	Summer X Games XV	BMX Vert	5th	
2010	Summer X Games XVI	BMX Vert	10th	
2011	Summer X Games XVII	BMX Vert	6th	
2012	Summer X Games XVIII	BMX Vert	9th	
2013	X Games Foz do Iguacu 2013	BMX Vert	9th	
2013	X Games Barcelona 2013	BMX Vert	7th	
2014	X Games Austin 2014	BMX Vert	3rd	Bronze medal
2015	X Games Austin 2015	BMX Vert	8th	
2016	X Games Austin 2016	BMX Vert	3rd	Bronze medal
2017	X Games Minneapolis 2017	BMX Vert	8th	
2018	X Games Minneapolis 2018	BMX Vert	7th	
