= X Games Foz do Iguaçu 2013 =

2013 extreme sports tournament

The X Games Foz do Iguaçu 2013 was an action sporting event which took place from April 18–21, 2013 in Foz do Iguaçu, Paraná, Brazil. Venues for the event included the Iguaçu National Park and Infraero Park.

It was the first Summer X Games held in 2013, before events in Barcelona, Spain (May 9–12); Munich, Germany (June 27–30); and Los Angeles, United States (August 1–4, 2013).

== Event locations ==
Venue locations for each sport disciplines for X Games Foz do Iguaçu:

=== Iguaçu National Park ===
- BMX Vert
- Skateboard Vert

=== Infraero Park ===
- BMX Dirt
- BMX Park
- BMX Big Air
- Moto X Best Whip
- Moto X Freestyle
- Moto X Speed & Style
- Moto X Step Up
- Moto X Enduro X
- Skateboard Big Air
- Skateboard Park
- Street League Skateboarding
- Rally Cross

== Results ==
=== Moto X ===
| Event | Gold | | Silver | | Bronze | |
|---|---|---|---|---|---|---|
| Moto X Freestyle | Taka Higashino (JPN) | 91.66 | Rob Adelberg (AUS) | 88.66 | Wes Agee (USA) | 87.33 |
| Moto X Step Up | Bryce Hudson (USA) | 31.00 | Ronnie Renner (USA) | 30.00 | Libor Podmol (CZE) | 29.00 |
| Moto X Best Whip | Jeremy Stenberg (USA) | 45.00% | Edgar Torronteras (ESP) | 30.00% | Josh Hansen (USA) | 17.00% |
| Moto X Speed & Style | Lance Coury (USA) | 97.853 | Andre Villa (NOR) | 84.66 | Mat Rebeaud (SWI) | 89.136 |
| Men's Moto X Enduro X | Taddy Blazusiak (POL) | 12:45.160 | Cody Webb (USA) | 12:54.633 | David Knight (GRB) | 13:04.609 |
| Women's Moto X Enduro X | Laia Sanz (ESP) | 7:56.305 | Maria Forsberg (USA) | 8:28.855 | Tarah Gieger (PUR) | 8:50.724 |

=== Skateboarding ===
| Event | Gold | | Silver | | Bronze | |
|---|---|---|---|---|---|---|
| Skateboard Big Air | Bob Burnquist (BRA) | 88.33 | Elliot Sloan (USA) | 87.66 | Jake Brown (AUS) | 87.25 |
| Skateboard Vert | Bucky Lasek (USA) | 91.162 | Sandro Dias (BRA) | 86.995 | Marcelo Bastos (BRA) | 86.162 |
| Men's Skateboard Park | Pedro Barros (BRA) | 83.00 | Rune Glifberg (DEN) | 76.00 | Ben Hatchell (USA) | 73.00 |
| Women's Skateboard Street | Leticia Bufoni (BRA) | 87.33 | Lacey Baker (USA) | 86.33 | Jéssica Florêncio (BRA) | 77.33 |
| Men's Street League Skateboarding | Nyjah Huston (USA) | 48.00 | Sean Malto (USA) | 39.80 | Torey Pudwill (USA) | 36.20 |

=== BMX ===
| Event | Gold | | Silver | | Bronze | |
|---|---|---|---|---|---|---|
| BMX Big Air | Zack Warden (USA) | 93.66 | Chad Kagy (USA) | 92.66 | Morgan Wade (USA) | 92.00 |
| BMX Vert | Jamie Bestwick (GRB) | 91.00 | Coco Zurita (CHI) | 82.00 | Steve McCann (AUS) | 78.00 |
| BMX Park | Kyle Baldock (AUS) | 74.00 | Pat Casey (USA) | 70.00 | Dennis Enarson (USA) | 70.00 |
| BMX Dirt | Kyle Baldock (AUS) | 92.00 | Brandon Dosch (USA) | 91.00 | Ryan Nyquist (USA) | 90.66 |

=== Rallying ===
| Event | Gold | | Silver | | Bronze | |
|---|---|---|---|---|---|---|
| RallyCross | Scott Speed (USA) | 3:53.522 | Toomas Heikkinen (FIN) | 3:54.249 | Patrik Sandell (SWE) | 3:58.329 |

=== Medal table ===
| Rank | Nation | Gold | Silver | Bronze | Total |
|---|---|---|---|---|---|
| 1 | United States | 7 | 9 | 7 | 23 |
| 2 | Brazil | 3 | 1 | 2 | 6 |
| 3 | Australia | 2 | 1 | 2 | 5 |
| 4 | Spain | 1 | 1 | 0 | 2 |
| 5 | Great Britain | 1 | 0 | 1 | 2 |
| 6 | Japan | 1 | 0 | 0 | 1 |
| 6 | Poland | 1 | 0 | 0 | 1 |
| 8 | Chile | 0 | 1 | 0 | 1 |
| 8 | Denmark | 0 | 1 | 0 | 1 |
| 8 | Finland | 0 | 1 | 0 | 1 |
| 8 | Norway | 0 | 1 | 0 | 1 |
| 12 | Czech Republic | 0 | 0 | 1 | 1 |
| 12 | Puerto Rico | 0 | 0 | 1 | 1 |
| 12 | Sweden | 0 | 0 | 1 | 1 |
| 12 | Switzerland | 0 | 0 | 1 | 1 |
| Totals (15 entries) | | 16 | 16 | 16 | 48 |
