= Bulcher, Texas =

- Unincorporated community
- Location within the state of Texas Bulcher (the United States)
- Coordinates: 33°48′01″N 97°25′47″W
- Country: United States
- State: Texas
- County: Cooke

Population (2000)
  - Total: 6
- Time zone: UTC-6 (Central (CST))
  - Summer (DST): UTC-5 (CDT)

Bulcher is a small unincorporated community in far northwestern Cooke County, Texas, United States. According to the Handbook of Texas, only six people lived in the community in 2000. It is located within the Dallas-Fort Worth Metroplex.

== History ==
John A. Dennis and his family are credited with being the first homesteaders in the area when they relocated to the site in 1872. Subsequent settlers included Matthew A. Morris, the postmaster upon the establishment of the post office in 1874, and John Scanland, who gave land for the Scanland Cemetery east and south of Bulcher. William H. Cox was another early inhabitant who constructed a cotton gin in Bulcher in 1875. The population stayed relatively steady at 250 until June 24, 1926, when oil was discovered nearby. Following the ensuing boom, Bulcher started its decline. In 1933, 40 people were living in the village; by 1986, there were 60. The community's population was unknown in the early 1990s, but in 2000 it was reported to only be six.

On May 7, 1995, an F3 tornado struck Bulcher.

Bulcher is host to the annual Last Man Standing rough-terrain motorcycle race. Polish motorcyclist Tadeusz Błażusiak won the race in 2007.

On July 28, 1921, Bulcher had a branch of the Cooke County Library in its vicinity.

Bulcher has two cemeteries per the Texas Department of Transportation; Shiloh, about 2.5 miles east, and Coker, about one mile southwest. Two other early settlers were Frederick and Charles Hyman from Germany.

== Geography ==
Bulcher is located on Farm to Market Road 373, 27 mi (43 km) northwest of Gainesville, 10 mi (16 km) northeast of Saint Jo, and 15 mi (24 km) northwest of Muenster in northwestern Cooke County. It is also five miles south of the Red River, and is on Farm to Market Road 2382.

== Education ==
Today, the community is served by the Saint Jo Independent School District.

== Notable person ==
- Foster Whaley, member of the Texas House of Representatives.
