= Curren Caples =

American skateboarder

Personal information
- Full name: Curren Gauge Caples
- Born: January 10, 1996 (age 30) Ohio, U.S.
- Home town: Ventura, California

Sport
- Country: United States
- Sport: Skateboarding
Medal record
Representing United States
Summer X Games
Gold medal – first place	2013 Munich	Park
Gold medal – first place	2015 Austin	Park
Silver medal – second place	2013 Barcelona	Park
Silver medal – second place	2016 Austin	Park

Curren Caples (born January 10, 1996) is an American professional skateboarder. He turned pro in March 2013, and his first professional contest was the Tampa Pro, where he placed 69th.

At X Games Barcelona 2013 he won a silver medal in skateboard park. That same year he won the VQS surf contest in Kauai beating Sunrise Shack owner Koa Smith. At X Games Munich 2013, he won a platinum medal in skateboard park, beating the favorite, Pedro Barros. Caples qualified 2nd behind Barros in the skateboard park qualifying at the 2014 Austin X Games, eventually finishing 1st in the final. In the skateboard street event he was knocked out of qualifying by Ryan Sheckler, failing to reach the final six. Most recently he finished 18th at the 2019 CBDMD Peahi Championships in Maui. Caples currently rides for Fucking Awesome, Ace Trucks, Spitfire Wheels, RVCA Clothing, Vans, Mob, Oakley, Bones Swiss Bearings, Monster Energy and Momentum Ride Shop.
