= Van Taylor =

American politician (born 1972)

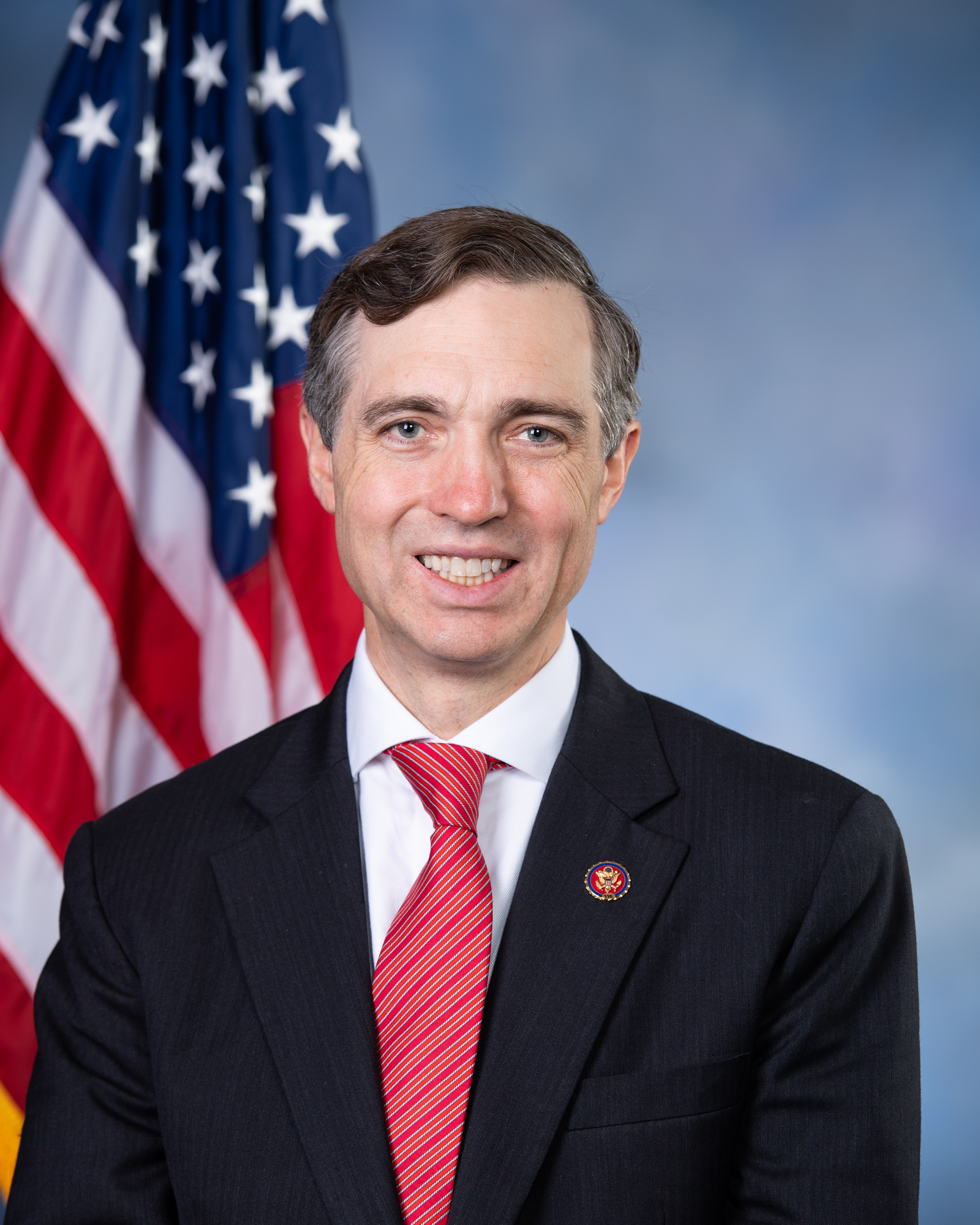
- Official portrait, 2019

Member of the U.S. House of Representatives from Texas's 3rd district
- In office January 3, 2019 – January 3, 2023
- Preceded by: Sam Johnson
- Succeeded by: Keith Self

Member of the Texas Senate from the 8th district
- In office January 13, 2015 – January 3, 2019
- Preceded by: Ken Paxton
- Succeeded by: Angela Paxton

Member of the Texas House of Representatives from the 66th district
- In office April 20, 2010 – January 13, 2015
- Preceded by: Brian McCall
- Succeeded by: Matt Shaheen

Personal details
- Born: Nicholas Van Campen Taylor; August 1, 1972 (age 54) Dallas, Texas, U.S.
- Party: Republican
- Spouse: Anne Coolidge (m. 2004; div. 2024)
- Children: 3
- Education: Harvard University (BA, MBA)
- Website: vantaylor.com

Military service
- Branch/service: United States Marine Corps
- Rank: Major
- Battles/wars: Iraq War

Nicholas Van Campen Taylor (born August 1, 1972), known as Van Taylor, is an American businessman and politician from Plano, Texas. A member of the Republican Party, he was the U.S. representative for Texas's 3rd congressional district from 2019 to 2023.

The district included much of Collin County, a suburban county north of Dallas. A veteran of the Iraq War, he represented the 8th district in the Texas Senate from 2015 to 2019. He also previously served in the Texas House of Representatives for the 66th district in southwestern Collin County. On March 2, 2022, Taylor admitted to an extramarital affair and announced that he would suspend his reelection campaign and retire at the end of the 117th Congress.

== Early life and education ==
A seventh-generation Texan, Taylor was born in Dallas. He is a descendant of Humble Oil co-founder Robert Lee Blaffer. He grew up in Midland, Texas, where he attended the Hillander School and San Jacinto Junior High School. He graduated from St. Paul's School in Concord, New Hampshire. With numerous AP credits, he subsequently graduated in three years from Harvard College in Cambridge, Massachusetts, from which he obtained a Bachelor of Arts in history. He earned a Master of Business Administration from Harvard Business School in 2001.

== Business career ==
From January 2002 to December 2018, Taylor worked for Churchill Capital Company, a real estate investment banking and principal investment firm, as a real estate investment banker. He previously worked for McKinsey & Company and Trammell Crow Company.

== Military service ==
In Iraq, Taylor was assigned to the Marine Corps' Company C, 4th Reconnaissance Battalion and fought with 2nd Force Reconnaissance Company. As a captain, Taylor led missions in advance of Task Force Tarawa during Operation Iraqi Freedom, which detected and defeated several Fedayeen ambushes. He also participated in a casualty evacuation of 31 wounded Marines, transporting them safely to medical treatment.

Taylor's military decorations include the Navy Commendation Medal with "V", the Combat Action Ribbon, and the Presidential Unit Citation. Taylor left the Marine Corps Reserve as a major.

== Early political career ==
=== 2006 campaign for U.S. House ===
In 2005 and 2006, Taylor ran for Texas's 17th congressional district in the United States House of Representatives. He won the Republican primary with 54.03% of the vote. With 40.31% of the vote in the general election, he lost to incumbent Democrat Chet Edwards.

=== Texas House of Representatives ===
==== 2010 campaign ====
On December 2, 2009, Taylor announced his candidacy for the District 66 Texas State House seat. Plano city council member Mabrie Jackson had already resigned from the council to enter the House race. On November 30, 2009, incumbent representative Brian McCall announced that he would not run for reelection. Observers speculated that McCall had told Jackson that he would step down so that she could get a head start in the campaign. McCall also endorsed Jackson as his successor.

The candidates in the March 2 Republican primary were Wayne Richards, Jackson, and Taylor. While Jackson earned the largest number of votes (41%) in the primary, she was shy of the 50% plus one vote required to win the nomination outright. Richards promptly endorsed Taylor, who then defeated Jackson in the April run-off election. McCall left the House seat early, and Taylor was sworn into office on April 20, 2010, by Collin County Judge Keith Self.

=== Texas State Senate ===
==== 2014 campaign ====
On August 2, 2013, Taylor announced he would seek the Republican Party's 2014 nomination for the Texas Senate, District 8 seat held by Ken Paxton, who was stepping down to run for state attorney general.

== Political positions ==
Taylor is considered a major ally of the Tea Party movement. He was endorsed by the North Texas Tea Party for his 2014 campaign for Texas Senate, District 8.

In 2017, Taylor introduced legislation to establish a registry of individuals who have been barred from employment at an educational facility. The measure, if adopted, would prevent any school employee, not just administration and faculty, from working at a school if the person is found to have engaged in an improper relationship with a student.

=== Juneteenth ===
Taylor was one of two House Republicans to co-sponsor the Juneteenth National Independence Day Act.

=== Foreign policy ===
Taylor was among 129 Republicans to oppose President Donald Trump's withdrawal from Syria.

== U.S. House of Representatives ==
=== Elections ===
==== 2018 ====
In August 2017, Taylor announced his candidacy for the United States House of Representatives for Texas's 3rd congressional district. Incumbent 13-term Republican Sam Johnson had announced his retirement. Taylor was endorsed by the Club for Growth, a national conservative group, and With Honor, a cross-partisan political group supporting next-generation military veterans. Taylor secured the nomination after easily winning the March 6 primary. He won the November 6 general election with 54.3% of the vote.

Taylor's victory continued a run of Republican control in one of the first areas of Texas to turn Republican. The GOP has held the seat without interruption since a 1968 special election, and Taylor is only the fourth person to represent it since then. At the same time, it was the closest race in the district in over half a century; indeed, it was the first time since the regular 1968 election that a Democrat had crossed the 40% mark.

==== 2020 ====
Taylor was unopposed in the 2020 Republican primary. In the general election, he faced Democrat Lulu Seikaly. Some observers considered him potentially vulnerable due to the district's demographic changes and its high population of college-educated voters, who had been trending away from the GOP in recent years. Taylor was reelected by over 12 percentage points even as President Donald Trump carried the district by only 1.

=== Tenure ===
On May 19, 2021, Taylor was one of 35 Republicans to join all Democrats in voting for legislation to establish the January 6 commission meant to investigate the storming of the U.S. Capitol. During his 2022 reelection campaign, this vote became a focal point for conservative critics and his opponents in the Republican primary, despite Taylor's conservative voting record on other issues.

==== 2022 campaign and allegations of infidelity ====
On February 27, 2022, two days before the Republican primary, right-wing media outlet National File posted an interview with Tania Joya, a British woman then living in Plano, who said that she and Taylor had a nine-month sexual affair in 2020 and 2021. Joya is the widow of Yahya al-Bahrumi (born John Georgelas), an American who gained notoriety for joining the Islamic State (commonly known as ISIS) in 2013, and has been dubbed the "ISIS bride" by the British tabloid press.

Saying that she and Taylor met during a "reprogramming" session for former jihadists, Joya shared salacious details about the affair and said that Taylor had given her $5,000 for her credit card bills and personal expenses. Her statements were repeated the next day by Breitbart News and circulated widely on social media. The Texas Tribune could not independently verify any of Joya's claims. In a statement to The Dallas Morning News, Joya said that she was "annoyed at having to see her ex-lover's face on billboards" and approached Taylor's Republican primary opponent Suzanne Harp (who would finish third in the primary), hoping that Harp would privately persuade Taylor to drop out of the race, but Taylor did not do so, prompting Joya to make her statements public.

On March 1, 2022, Taylor won 49% of the vote in the Republican primary, short of the 50% majority required to win outright, triggering a May 24 runoff election against runner-up and former Collin County judge Keith Self. The next day, in an email to supporters, Taylor announced the suspension of his reelection campaign: "About a year ago, I made a horrible mistake that has caused deep hurt and pain among those I love most in this world. I had an affair, it was wrong, and it was the greatest failure of my life. I want to apologize for the pain I have caused with my indiscretion, most of all to my wife Anne and our three daughters." Taylor did not indicate that he would resign from office before the end of his term but a campaign spokesperson said that he would withdraw from the election. Taylor formally withdrew from the runoff two days later, making Self the Republican nominee by default.

=== Committee assignment ===
- Committee on Financial Services

=== Caucus memberships ===
- For Country Caucus, Co-Chair
- Problem Solvers Caucus
- Republican Study Committee

== Personal life ==
Taylor married Anne Coolidge, a real estate investment manager, in 2004. The couple divorced in 2024.

== Electoral history ==
Republican primary results, 2018
Party	Candidate	Votes	%
Republican	Van Taylor	45,475	84.7
Republican	David Niederkorn	5,052	9.4
Republican	Alex Donkervoet	3,185	5.9
Total votes		53,712	100.0

Texas's 3rd congressional district, 2018
Party	Candidate	Votes	%
Republican	Van Taylor	169,520	54.2
Democratic	Lorie Burch	138,234	44.2
Libertarian	Christopher Claytor	4,604	1.5
Independent	Jeff Simons (write-in)	153	0.1
Total votes		312,511	100.0
Republican hold			

Texas's 3rd congressional district, 2020
Party	Candidate	Votes	%
Republican	Van Taylor (incumbent)	230,512	55.1
Democratic	Lulu Seikaly	179,458	42.9
Libertarian	Christopher Claytor	8,621	2.1
Total votes		418,591	100.0
Republican hold			

Republican primary results, 2022
Party	Candidate	Votes	%
Republican	Van Taylor (incumbent)	31,489	48.8
Republican	Keith Self	17,058	26.5
Republican	Suzanne Harp	13,375	20.8
Republican	Rickey Williams	1,731	2.7
Republican	Jeremy Ivanovskis	818	1.3
Total votes		64,471	100.0

U.S. House of Representatives
Preceded by Sam Johnson	Member of the U.S. House of Representatives from Texas's 3rd congressional district 2019–2023	Succeeded by Keith Self
U.S. order of precedence (ceremonial)
Preceded by Steve Stockman as Former U.S. Representative	Order of precedence of the United States as Former U.S. Representative	Succeeded by Tony Gonzales as Former U.S. Representative
