= Dennis Enarson =

American cyclist

Personal information
- Born: April 19, 1991 (age 35) La Mesa, California, U.S.
Medal record
Representing United States
Summer X Games
Silver medal – second place	2018 X Games Minneapolis	BMX Street
Bronze medal – third place	2016 World of X Games	Real BMX
Gold medal – first place	2016 Austin	BMX Park
Silver medal – second place	2015 Austin	BMX Park
Bronze medal – third place	2014 Austin	BMX Freestyle Street
Bronze medal – third place	2013 Foz do Iguaçu	BMX Park
Silver medal – second place	2011 Los Angeles	BMX Street
Silver medal – second place	2011 Los Angeles	BMX Park
Silver medal – second place	2010 Los Angeles	BMX Park
Silver medal – second place	2010 Los Angeles	BMX Street

Dennis Enarson (born April 19, 1991 in La Mesa, California) is a professional BMX rider who has won 10 X Games medals and Dew Tour Dirt Jumping & Park events. He is known as one of the best riders in freestyle for his cannonball barspins and ability to adapt to any street, park or dirt course. He is currently residing in San Diego, California and trains with Coach John Welch at NAKOA Fitness.

Enarson began racing BMX at age 8 but decided to quit to begin riding streets and skate parks because he enjoyed it more. He designed the BMX Park course at the 2011 Dew Tour in Portland, OR. He has his own signature frame with Haro Bikes called the SD and a full range of signature BMX parts with Demolition parts, called 'The Rig' line.

== Unclicked Podcast ==
In 2019 Enarson started his own podcast named 'Unclicked', ran out of his San Diego home. He interviews fellow BMX professionals and industry personalities, and releases episodes each Monday via Spotify and Buzzsprout. In 2020 Dennis started working with Ryan Fudger from 'our bmx' to continue making podcasts.
