= Matt Shaheen =

American politician (born 1965)

Member of the Texas House of Representatives from the 66th district
- Incumbent
- Assumed office January 13, 2015
- Preceded by: Van Taylor

Personal details
- Born: Matthew Frank Shaheen; June 8, 1965 (age 61) Virginia, U.S.
- Party: Republican
- Spouse: Robyn
- Children: 3
- Education: Randolph–Macon College (BS); Southern Methodist University (MA)
- Website: Office website

Matthew Frank Shaheen (born June 8, 1965) is an American politician serving as a member of the Texas House of Representatives from the 66th district. Elected in the November 2014, he assumed office in January 2015.

== Early life and education ==
Shaheen was born in Virginia. He earned a Bachelor of Science degree in business economics from Randolph–Macon College and a Master of Arts in liberal arts from Southern Methodist University.

== Career ==
Shaheen worked as a business executive at Hewlett Packard Enterprise.

== Political career ==
He was also a member of the Collin County Board of Commissioners. On December 2, 2013, Shaheen resigned from his seat on the commissioners court to run for the Texas House of Representatives, replacing Van Taylor who decided to run for the Texas Senate. Shaheen cited "a desire to help keep Texas business friendly and a good place to raise a family" as his reasoning to run for higher office.

Shaheen was elected to the Texas House of Representatives in November 2014 and assumed office in January 2015. During the 2019–2020 legislative session, Shaheen was the vice chair of the House Urban Affairs Committee. Shaheen is the founder of the Texas Freedom Caucus, a legislative caucus in the Texas House modeled after the Freedom Caucus.

During the 2016 Republican Party presidential primaries, Shaheen endorsed Senator Ted Cruz.

Shaheen was viewed as a possible candidate for the Texas Senate in 2018, but opted to seek re-election to the House instead.

Along with the other Republican representatives from Collin County, Shaheen voted to impeach Attorney General Ken Paxton.

Shaheen supports a ban on Democrats being given committee chairmanships as long as the Republicans hold the majority of seats in the Texas House.

During the 2025 special session of the 89th Texas Legislature, Shaheen filed the house version of a bill to grant the Attorney General of Texas to independently prosecute election crimes without waiting to be invited by a local district attorney, a priority for Attorney General Ken Paxton. He also filed a bill banning any state lawmaker who is absent for the purposes of impeding legislative action from accepting campaign contributions greater than $221, the daily per diem during a regular or special session. According to Shaheen, "members cannot financially benefit from quorum breaking absences." This was in response to the quorum break by Texas House Democrats to unsuccessfully prevent the GOP from passing a new congressional map giving Republicans a five-seat advantage in the 2026 midterm elections.

== Electoral history ==
Republican primary results, 2014
Party	Candidate	Votes	%
Republican	Matt Shaheen	4,916	48.83
Republican	Glenn Callison	4,031	40.04
Republican	Stacy Chen	1,120	11.13
Total votes		10,067	100.00

Republican primary runoff results, 2014
Party	Candidate	Votes	%
Republican	Matt Shaheen	4,612	54.27
Republican	Glenn Callison	3,886	45.73
Total votes		8,498	100.00

Texas House of Representatives, District 66, 2014
Party	Candidate	Votes	%
Republican	Matt Shaheen	24,631	100.00
Total votes		24,631	100.00
Republican hold			

Texas House of Representatives, District 66, 2016
Party	Candidate	Votes	%
Republican	Matt Shaheen	40,368	57.39
Democratic	Gnanse Nelson	27,240	38.73
Libertarian	Shawn W. Jones	2,726	3.88
Total votes		70,334	100.00
Republican hold			

Texas House of Representatives, District 66, 2018
Party	Candidate	Votes	%
Republican	Matt Shaheen	34,382	50.29
Democratic	Sharon Hirsch	33,991	49.71
Total votes		68,373	100.00
Republican hold			

Texas House of Representatives, District 66, 2020
Party	Candidate	Votes	%
Republican	Matt Shaheen	42,728	49.56
Democratic	Sharon Hirsch	41,879	48.58
Libertarian	Shawn W. Jones	1,600	1.86
Total votes		86,207	100.00
Republican hold			

Texas House of Representatives, District 66, 2022
Party	Candidate	Votes	%
Republican	Matt Shaheen	42,795	60.42
Democratic	Jesse Ringness	28,039	39.58
Total votes		70,834	100.00
Republican hold			

Republican primary results, 2024
Party	Candidate	Votes	%
Republican	Matt Shaheen	11,037	63.75
Republican	Wayne Richard	6,276	36.25
Total votes		17,313	100.00

Texas House of Representatives, District 66, 2024
Party	Candidate	Votes	%
Republican	Matt Shaheen	58,294	61.11
Democratic	David W. Carstens	37,098	38.89
Total votes		95,392	100.00
Republican hold			

Texas House of Representatives
Preceded by Van Taylor	Member of the Texas House of Representatives from the 66th district 2015–present	Incumbent
