= Edgard Pereira =

Brazilian skateboarder

Edgard "Vovô" Pereira
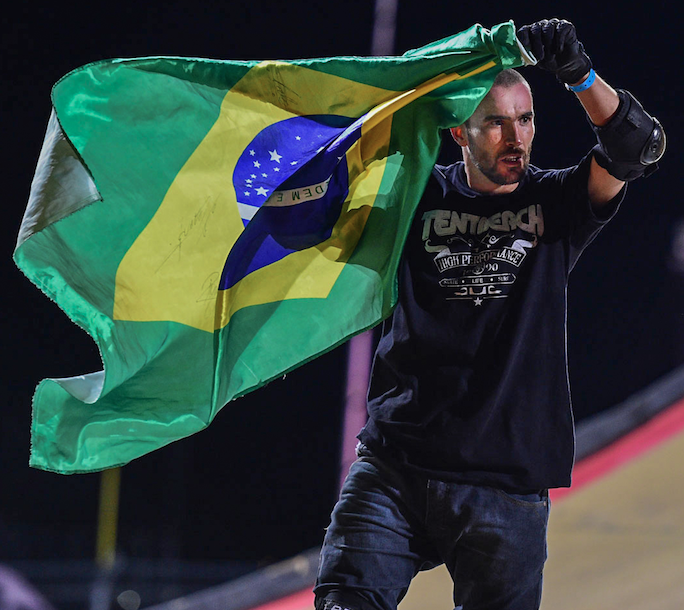

Personal information
- Nickname: Vovô (Grandpa)
- Born: 13 May 1982 (age 44)
- Website: www.eddyvovo.com
Medal record
Summer X Games
Representing Brazil
Bronze medal – third place	2011 Los Angeles	Skateboard Big Air
Bronze medal – third place	2014 Austin	Skateboard Big Air

Edgar "Vovô" Pereira (born 13 May 1982), also known as "Edgar Vovô", is a Brazilian professional skateboarder.

== Early life ==
Pereira was introduced to skateboarding while working as a motorcycle courier in São Bernardo do Campo in 1998. Initially focused on street style riding, Edgard was introduced to mini-ramp skateboarding in 1999 by "the crowd", a group of skateboarders in the Jordanopolis neighborhood. Transition style skateboarding quickly became Pereira's passion, and he began competing in Vert skateboarding contests in Brazil.

== Career ==
Pereira is most known for his competition in Mega Ramp contests. In 2010, he was invited to his first X Games and finished 6th. In the following year, he finished in 3rd place at X Games Big Air, solidifying his place as a top rider. During the next years he was invited to participate at X Games around the world and was always a top finisher. In 2014, Vovo achieved 3rd place finishes in both the Brazilian Skate Circuit Vertical and X Games Austin Big Air where his run consisted of a backflip and a huge backside 540 heelflip flip, a never before seen trick.

== Contest history ==
- 2002: 1st in Skate Vertical Amador
- 2003: 1st in Skate Vertical Amador
- 2005: 4th in X Games Brasil, Vertical
- 2006: 5th in Rio Vert Jam, Vertical
- 2007: 6th in Rio Vert Jam, Vertical
- 2008: 8th in OI Vert Jam, Vertical
- 2008: 9th in X Games, Big Air
- 2009: 5th in X Games, Big Air
- 2010: 2nd in Circuito Brasileio de Skate, Vertical
- 2010: 6th in X Games, Big Air
- 2011: 3rd in X Games, Big Air
- 2012: 4th in Circuito Brasileio de Skate, Vertical
- 2012: 8th in X Games Los Angeles, Big Air
- 2013: 6th in Copa Brasil de Skate, Vertical
- 2013: 5th in X Games Foz do Iguaçu, Big Air
- 2013: 7th in X Games Barcelona, Big Air
- 2013: 6th in X Games Munich, Big Air
- 2013: 5th in X Games Los Angeles, Big Air
- 2014: 3rd in Brazilian Skate Circuit, Vertical
- 2014: 3rd in X Games Austin, Big Air
- 2015: 7th in X Games Austin, Big Air
