= Cirque Rocks =

2006 charity circus held in New Zealand

Cirque Rocks was a charity circus held in Auckland, New Zealand event that was organised by the Dean Lonergan Events organisation and sponsored by McDonald's restaurants. The event was held August 23–26, 2006, with 215 performers. The event was held in the Trust's Stadium in Waitakere.

It featured over 80 circus acts and X-Games performers, choreographed to a 60-piece orchestra. The theme of the night being the history of Rock 'n Roll. The festivities began to a backdrop of early Rock 'n Roll hits and through the night progressed into today's modern rock.

The event was held live at the Trusts Stadium in Auckland on August 23, 2006, and broadcast a couple of days later on local network TV3 on Saturday, August 26, 2006.

The charities that this event raised money for were:

- Ronald McDonald House
- Yellow Ribbon (Prevention of Youth Suicide)
- Child Cancer Foundation

== Performances ==
These are among some of the acts performed at the Cirque Rocks event.

- Plate Spinning
- Holland's Motorcycle Globe of Death
- Sunchasing
- X-Games bikers - - Chad Kagy, Ryan Nyquist, Jamie Bestwick and Scott Cranmer.
- Trampolining
- Cage of Death
- Ramashov Russian swings
- Troupe Mayarov Fast Track Tumbling
- Motorcycle Foot Jugglers from Russia
- The Flying Wallendas (the world's greatest high wire act)

Cirque Rocks was a contemporary circus event and therefore did not use any performing animals.

== Disappearance ==
On August 29, 2006, it was reported that a Chinese performer associated with the Chasing Sun chair balance act failed to turn up for her flight back to China. No further details are apparent and her disappearance remains a mystery.
