= Last Man Standing (motorcycle race) =

Last Man Standing is a motorcycle race held annually in Bulcher, Texas, United States. The race consists of 300 of the world's top enduro riders from around the world. The race takes place on the Red River Motorcycle Trails course straddling the Texas/Oklahoma border.

Located northwest of Dallas/Fort Worth along the Texas-Oklahoma border, the Red River Motorcycle Trails have some of the most challenging terrain in North America for racing Enduro Motorcycles. The event is a carved out 40-mile loop that features steep rocky climbs, descents, boulders the size of cars and forests with trees that one can barely walk through. The race also presents its riders with the 100 mph straight-aways of hard packed, loamy dirt and sand.

== Race ==
The race is an "every man for himself never before seen in off-road racing," according to Josh Whitaker with KTM North America, who represents the leading manufacturer of off-road motorcycles. " Last Man Standing Enduro Event combines gut-wrenching terrain with favorite elements from Enduro, Cross Country and Desert racing techniques. Red Bull sponsors the Last Man Standing event which consists of four elimination stages of one lap each and starts by bunching together approximately 300 invited riders on the 40-mile circuit.

== Course ==
The first two 40-mile laps happen during the day and the second two laps at night. The top 50 percent of the riders then move on until only 25 riders are left for the fourth and final stage. The rider who wins the event is crowned "Last Man Standing" claiming the majority share of prize money made up of entry fees.

The Course starts with 200 riders, side-by-side. Each line-up is in a valley with no lines and no trails. What awaits the riders is all terrain. Across the valley, a signal fire is lit, which is when the riders take off.

== Trail ==
The trails have the tightest, fastest, steepest, and most technical terrain. The ever-changing dirt brings the red clay of the Southeast and the hard packed light colored sand mix of the West into a cloud storm of riders and dust. At night, only the best at the top of their game will advance to the night laps and face a reversed direction of the race.

== Finish ==
The Finish of the race is a test of skill, endurance, and mental toughness. The race is a race to survive. Because in the end, there is only one who will emerge as the best as Last Man Standing
