= X Games Austin 2014 =

2014 extreme sports tournament

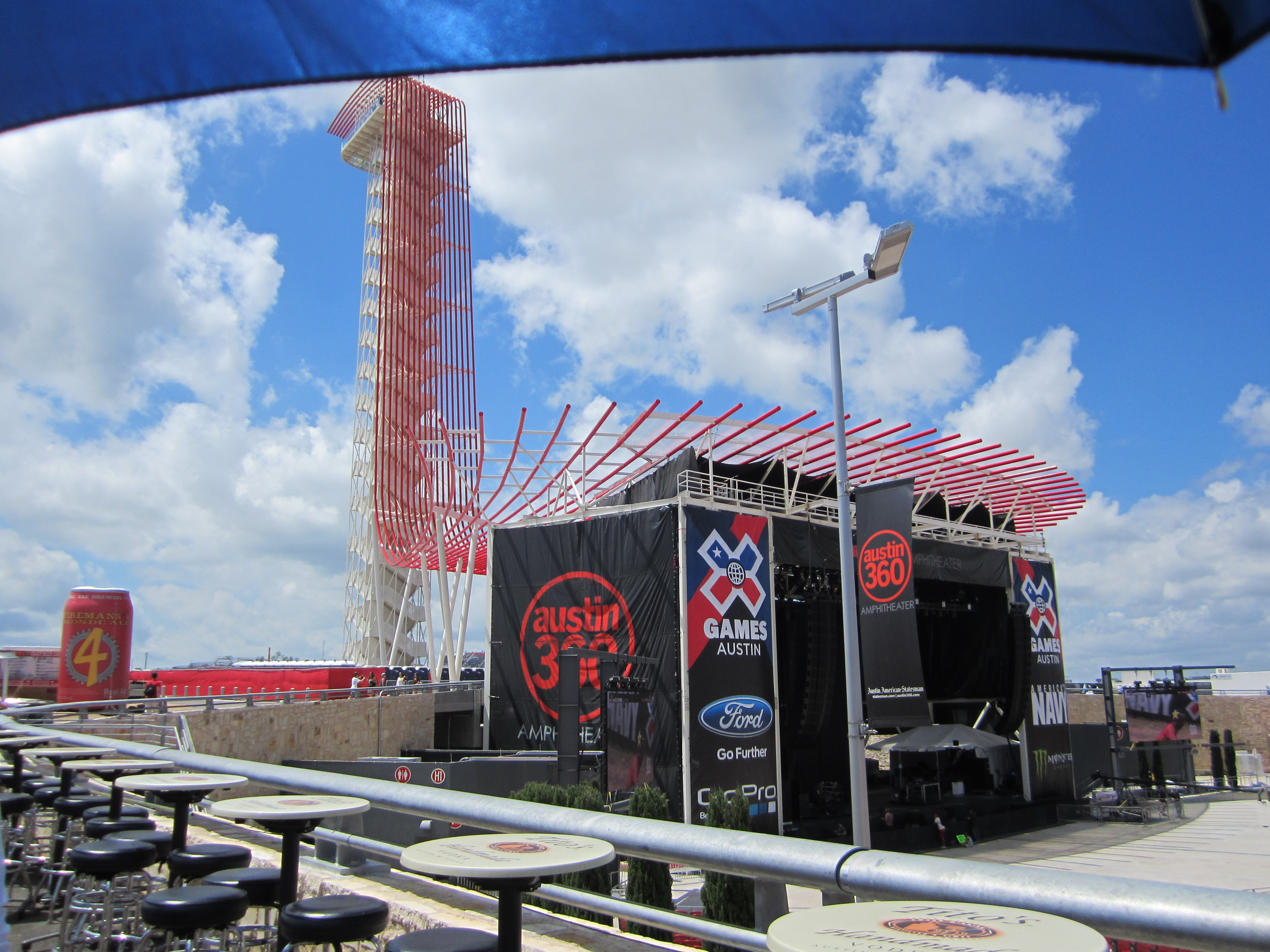
- Venue: Circuit of the Americas
- Location: Austin, Texas
- Date: June 5–8

X Games Austin 2014 was an action sporting event that took place over June 5–8, 2014, at the Circuit of the Americas in Austin, Texas.

While the Summer X Games in past years was typically held in California, this was the first full X Games event to be held in the state of Texas; in 2003, a special "Global Championships" event was held in San Antonio, Texas. The games were originally announced to be held on May 15–18, but were slipped to the next month, the reason given by ESPN was for a more favorable broadcast window.

X Games Austin gained a 4-day attendance of 160,000 and an all-time total of 5,069,115. It was also announced on the ESPN broadcast that next year's X Games will again be hosted in Austin, Texas and that a new event, Moto X Flat Track will make its debut.

== Results ==
=== Moto X ===
Event	Gold		Silver		Bronze	
Men's Moto X Enduro	Tadeusz Błażusiak (POL)	8:35.484	Cody Webb (USA)	8:37.829	Alfredo Gomez (ESP)	8:41.462
Women's Moto X Enduro	Kacey Martinez (USA)	5:16.365	Sandra Gómez Cantero (ESP)	5:26.480	Rachel Gutish (USA)	5:44.419
Moto X Best Whip	Tom Parsons (USA)	33.00%	Jeremy Stenberg (USA)	23.00%	Josh Hansen (USA)	18.00%
Moto X Step Up	Ronnie Renner (USA)	34.00	Bryce Hudson (USA)	33.50	Libor Podmol (CZE)	33.00
Men's Moto X Speed & Style	Mike Mason (USA)	83.50	Blake Wilson (AUS)	80.56	Jarryd McNeil (AUS)	79.50
Moto X Freestyle	Event canceled					

=== Skateboarding ===
Event	Gold		Silver		Bronze	
Skateboard Freestyle Vert	Jimmy Wilkins (USA)	87.00	Sandro Dias (BRA)	85.66	Mitchie Brusco (USA)	84.00
Skateboard Big Air	Tom Schaar (USA)	89.00	Bob Burnquist (BRA)	88.00	Edgard Pereira (BRA)	87.00
Skateboard Park	Pedro Barros (BRA)	90.66	Grant Taylor (USA)	84.00	Aaron Homoki (USA)	81.00
Skateboard Street Amateurs	Tyson Bowerbank (USA)	85.00	Chase Webb (USA)	80.66	Nassim Guammaz (NED)	77.66
Women's Skateboard Street	Leo Baker (USA)	-	Pamela Rosa (BRA)	-	Leticia Bufoni (BRA)	-
Men's Skateboard Street	Nyjah Huston (USA)	95.00	Luan Oliveira (BRA)	87.66	Alec Majerus (USA)	85.66
Skateboard Real Street	Clint Walker (USA)	-	Wes Kremer (USA)	-	Forrest Edwards (USA)	-

=== BMX ===
Event	Gold		Silver		Bronze	
BMX Vert	Jamie Bestwick (GB)	92.66	Simon Tabron (GB)	89.66	Dennis McCoy (USA)	88.33
BMX Freestyle Street	Garrett Reynolds (USA)	90.66	Dakota Roche (USA)	89.33	Dennis Enarson (USA)	89.00
BMX Dirt	Kyle Baldock (AUS)	95.00	Ben Wallace (GB)	90.33	Brandon Dosch (USA)	88.33
GoPro BMX Freestyle Big Air	Colton Satterfield (USA)	90.66	Morgan Wade (USA)	89.66	James Foster (USA)	87.66

=== Rallying & Off-Road Truck ===
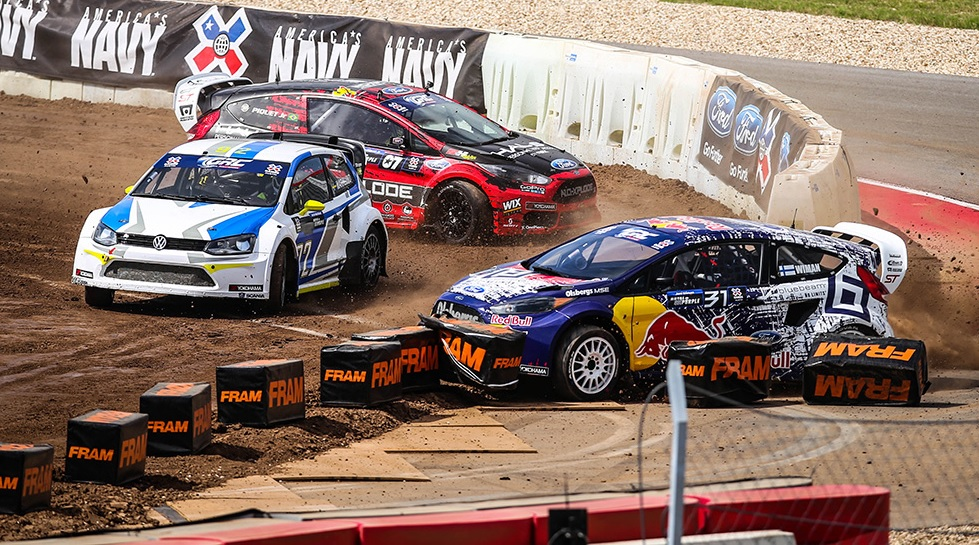
Joni Wiman (off track), Toomas Heikkinen (white and blue car) and Nelson Piquet Jr. (red car) in the RallyCross event

Event	Gold		Silver		Bronze	
RallyCross Lites	Mitchell DeJong (USA)	5:22.019	Kevin Eriksson (SWE)	5:24.333	Austin Cindric (USA)	5:29.036
RallyCross	Scott Speed (USA)	4:12.072	Bucky Lasek (USA)	4:17.480	Nelson Piquet Jr. (BRA)	4:28.472
Stadium Super Trucks	Apdaly Lopez (MEX)	27:29.567	Sheldon Creed (USA)	27:35.262	Robby Gordon (USA)	27:36.600

=== MLG X Games Invitational COD: Ghosts ===
This X Games also awarded medals for E-Sports for the first time in a Call of Duty: Ghosts tournament co-organized by Major League Gaming. Eight teams participated – the top three finishers from the 2014 COD Championship and the remaining five COD Pro Points top scorers.

Event	Gold	Silver	Bronze
Call of Duty: Ghosts	OpTic Gaming: Matthew Haag (NaDeSHoT) (USA); Seth Abner (Scump) (USA); James Eubanks (Clayster) (USA); Jordan Cannon (ProoFy) (USA)	Team Kaliber: Brandon Rodgers (Sharp) (USA); Jeremy Olsen (Neslo) (USA); Jevon Gooljar-Lim (Goonjar) (CAN); Bryan Zhelyazkov (Apathy) (USA)	Evil Geniuses: Patrick Price (ACHES) (USA); Tyler Polchow (TeePee) (USA); Ian Porter (Crimsix) (USA); Damon Barlow (Karma) (CAN)

=== Medal table ===
Rank	Nation	Gold	Silver	Bronze	Total
1	United States	13	9	12	34
2	Brazil	1	4	3	8
3	Great Britain	1	2	0	3
4	Australia	1	1	1	3
5	Mexico	1	0	0	1
5	Poland	1	0	0	1
7	Spain	0	1	1	2
8	Canada	0	1	0	1
9	Czech Republic	0	0	1	1
9	Netherlands	0	0	1	1
Totals (10 entries)		18	18	19	55

== Highlights ==
BMXer Jamie Bestwick won his ninth consecutive gold medal in BMX Vert event. At 14 years of age, Skateboarder Tom Schaar becomes the youngest to win the Skateboarding Big Air event, pulling off a 900 at the top of the massive ramp. Skaterboarder Nyjah Huston ties the highest score ever in the Skateboarding Street event in X Games history.

== See also ==
- Fun Fun Fun Fest
