= Foster Whaley =

American politician

Member of the Texas House of Representatives from the 84th district
- In office January 11, 1983 – January 10, 1989
- Preceded by: Clint Hackney
- Succeeded by: Warren Chisum

Member of the Texas House of Representatives from the 66th district
- In office January 9, 1979 – January 11, 1983
- Preceded by: Phil Cates
- Succeeded by: Dick Burnett

Personal details
- Born: March 23, 1920 Bulcher, Texas, U.S.
- Died: April 25, 1993 (aged 73) Pampa, Texas, U.S.
- Party: Democratic

Foster Whaley (March 23, 1920 – April 25, 1993) was an American politician who served in the Texas House of Representatives from 1979 to 1989.
