= Superenduro =

Hybrid motorcycle competition

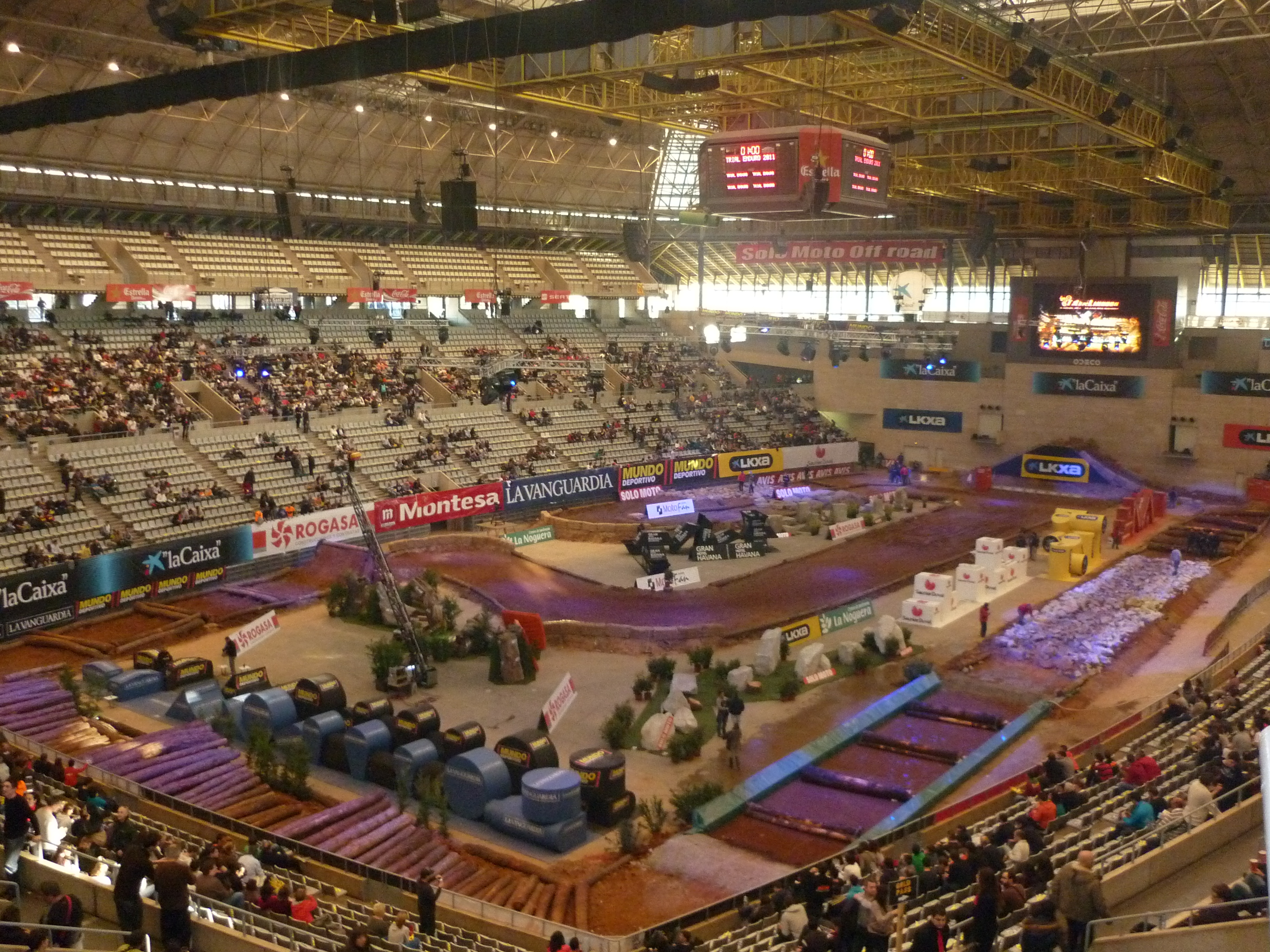
2011 Barcelona Indoor Enduro course

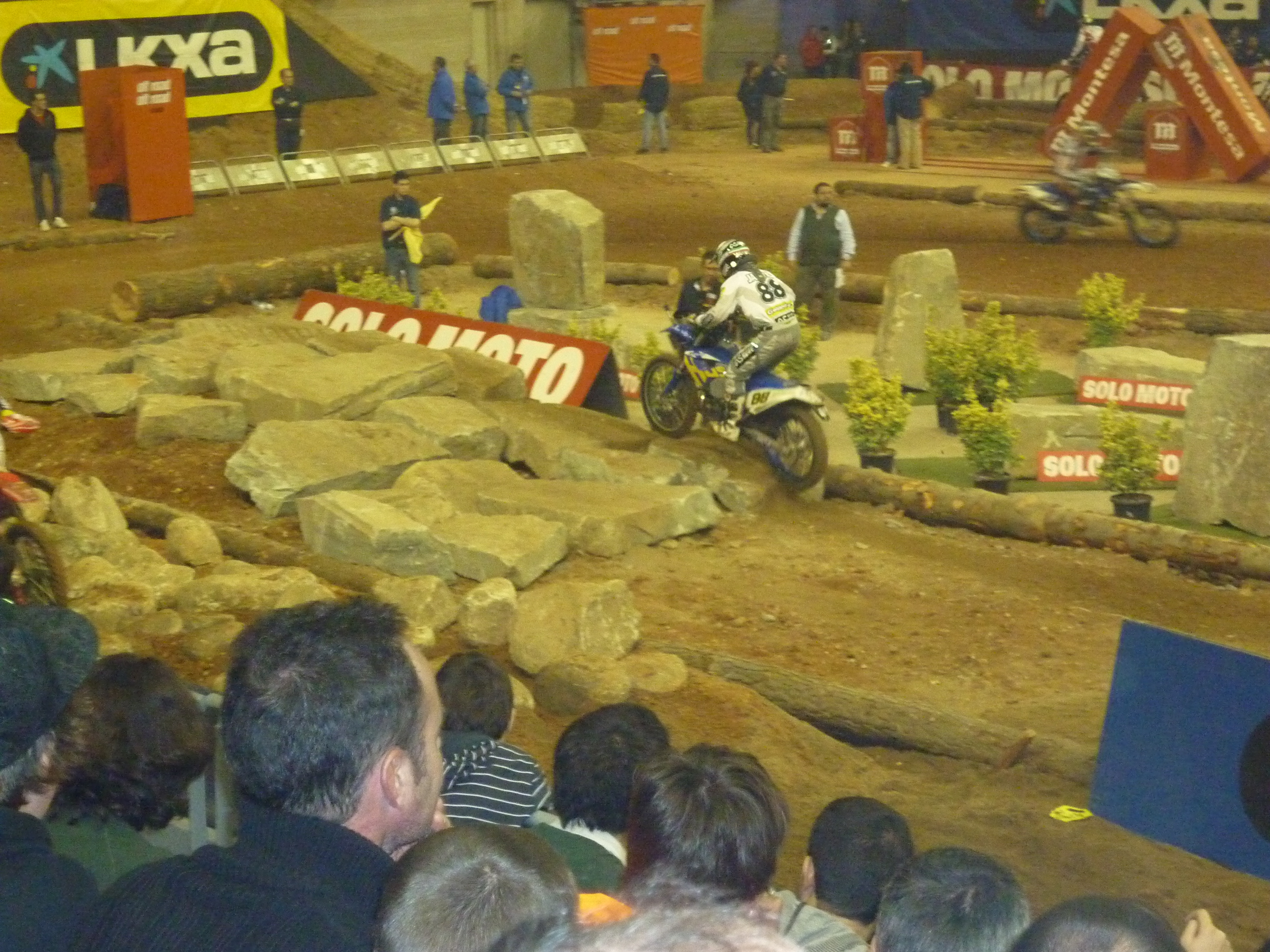
Graham Jarvis at the 2011 Barcelona Indoor Enduro

Indoor enduro or SuperEnduro which is also known by Endurocross shortened Enduro-X or EX, is a hybrid motorcycle competition, a mix of supercross and enduro racing held indoors over obstacles resembling a trials track. Super enduro events are typically held in hockey or downsized basketball arenas. Its main difference with supercross is in there being "hard rock sections" and wooden parts (resembling fallen trees) akin to enduro and technical 'trials' courses, rather than tarmac in between jumps. Tracks incorporate various elements of off-road riding, including rocks, boulders, logs, sand, mud, a water-hole and special obstacles (like giant tires). A Super enduro course is much faster than a trials course and much slower than a supercross course.

== History ==
The indoor enduro debuted in 2000 as a support event to the Barcelona Trial Indoor, organized by Jaime Alguersuari Sr. The hybrid sport expanded to other European cities in the 2000s.

In 2007, the FIM created the FIM Indoor Enduro World Cup, later named the FIM Indoor Enduro World Championship but now renamed to the FIM SuperEnduro World Championship, which despite the name had only been held in Europe until the 2013/14 season.

Super enduro in the United States was founded by Eric Peronnard, responsible for the US Open of Motocross and the Supercross Paris-Bercy. It was originally held as a one-off event called EnduroCross at the Orleans Arena in Las Vegas, Nevada. The race was expanded into the AMA EnduroCross Championship in 2007.

An AMA EnduroCross round was added to the X Games Los Angeles for the 2011 and 2012 editions. In 2013, the four X Games summer games featured endurocross rounds, and did not award points for the AMA EnduroCross Championship. The X Games endurocross events are also organized by Peronnard.

== See also ==
- Hare scramble
