= Kyle Baldock =

BMX Dirt and Freestyle rider

Personal information
- Nationality: Australian
- Born: 29 March 1991 (age 35) Gold Coast
- Occupations: Professional BMX Athlete, BMX Instructor

Kyle Baldock (born 29 March 1991) is a BMX Freestyle Dirt and Park rider from Gold Coast, Australia.

== Sanctioned Events ==
- 2018 X Games Sydney - Dirt: 2nd
- 2017 X Games Minneapolis - BMX Dirt Best Trick: 1st
- 2016 X Games Austin - Park: 3rd / BMX Park Best Trick: 1st
- 2015 X Games Austin - Dirt: 1st
- 2015 Monster Energy Cup BMX Jam - Dirt: 1st
- 2014 X Games Austin - Dirt: 1st
- 2013 Red Bull Farm Jam - Dirt: 1st
- 2013 X Games Foz do Iguacu - Drt and Park: 1st
- 2012 BMX Worlds, Cologne, Germany - Dirt: 1st
- 2011 Alli Dew Tour, Ocean City, MD - Park: 1st
- 2011 Alli Dew Tour, Salt Lake City, UT - Big Air: 1st
- 2009 Core Series Round Two, Queensland, Australia - 1st
