= Go-Big Show =

2021 American television series

- Presented by: Bert Kreischer
- Judges: Rosario Dawson; Cody Rhodes; Jennifer Nettles; Snoop Dogg; T-Pain
- Country of origin: United States
- Original language: English
- No. of seasons: 2
- No. of episodes: 20

Production
- Executive producers: Ted Chung; Conrad Green; Bert Kreischer; Ben Silverman; Howard T. Owens; Jay Peterson; Todd Lubin; Snoop Dogg; Brisa Hernandez; Greg Lipstone
- Producers: Erin Dellorso; Carrie Weisberg
- Production companies: Propagate Content; Matador Content; Snoopadelic Films

Original release
- Network: TBS
- Release: January 7, 2021 – March 10, 2022

Go-Big Show is an American competition series that aired on TBS from January 7, 2021, to March 10, 2022. In contrast to other talent shows, Go-Big Show focuses on bigger scale performances featuring monster trucks, horse riding and large stage acts. On each episode, performers compete for an opportunity to advance toward the season finale, with a grand prize of $100,000 at stake. The second season premiered on January 6, 2022.

The show formerly featured Rosario Dawson, Cody Rhodes, Jennifer Nettles and T-Pain as judges. It was hosted by Bert Kreischer.

== Cast ==
Go-Big Show is hosted by Bert Kreischer (comedian). Judges include Cody Rhodes (wrestler), Jennifer Nettles (singer) and Rosario Dawson (actress). Snoop Dogg (rapper) was one of the four judges during season one. However, in August 2021, it was announced that T-Pain (rapper) would replace him for season two. Previously, DJ Khaled was planned to join the show.

Cast by season
Season	Host	Judges			
1	Bert Kreischer	Cody Rhodes	Jennifer Nettles	Rosario Dawson	Snoop Dogg
2	Bert Kreischer	Cody Rhodes	Jennifer Nettles	Rosario Dawson	T-Pain

== Format ==
On each of the six qualifier episodes, three pairs of acts perform for the judges. Each act is scored on a scale of 1 to 100 (using levers/throttles connected to a 23-foot "Power Tower" equipped with 4,000 LED lights). The higher-scoring act of the pair advances to the semifinals. If both acts in a match-up receive the same score, a coin toss is used to decide the winner.

For each of the three episodes in the semifinals, two heats of three acts each perform and are scored as in the preliminaries. The high scorers from the respective heats advance to a vote by the judges to determine which act will move on to the finals. Once the semifinals are complete, the judges select one of the three acts eliminated by their votes to advance as a "wild card".

The finale consists of three rounds, with each act being scored as in previous episodes. Two acts face off in the first round, and the low scorer is eliminated. In each of the following rounds, one new act performs and must outscore the winner of the previous round in order to eliminate them and advance. The winner of the third round receives the $100,000 grand prize.

== Season 1 overview (2021) ==
Each act is scored on a scale of 1 to 100, calculated as an average of the scores given by the individual judges. During the Qualifier Rounds, performers go head-to-head, and the act that receives the highest combined score moves on to the next round.

Match-Up Winner

=== Episode 1: "Welcome to the Go-Big Show" ===
Original air date: January 7, 2021 US Viewership: 1.03

==== Match-Up 1: Kurtis Downs vs. Grace Good ====
Act	Talent	Score
Kurtis Downs	Freestyle BMX	96
Grace Good	Circus Performer	90

==== Match-Up 2: Andrew S. vs. Scott Anderson ====
Act	Talent	Score
Andrew Stanton	Sideshow Performer	95
Scott Anderson	Magician	95

Andrew won the tie-breaking coin toss.

==== Match-Up 3: Orissa Kelly vs. Jamie Keeton ====
Act	Talent	Score
Orissa Kelly	Foot Archery Performer	89
Jamie Keeton	Human Mutant	79

=== Episode 2: "You Can't Unsee This!" ===
Original air date: January 14, 2021 US Viewership: 0.99

==== Match-Up 1: The Gator Crusader vs. Tulga ====
Act	Talent	Score
The Gator Crusader	Alligator Act	85
Tulga	Mongolian Strong Man	94

==== Match-Up 2: Wheelz vs. Tomas Garcilazo ====
Act	Talent	Score
Wheelz	Wheelchair Motocross	86
Tomas Garcilazo	Rope Artist & Horseman	91

==== Match-Up 3: Gabe The One Armed Archer vs. Cassidy Rose ====
Act	Talent	Score
Gabe George	One Armed Archery	91
Cassidy Rose	Country Singing & Yodeling	89

=== Episode 3: "And You Thought That Was Risky?" ===
Original air date: January 21, 2021 US Viewership: 0.77

==== Match-Up 1: Ben Blaque vs. Tyler Scheuer ====
Act	Talent	Score
Ben Blaque	Crossbow	94
Tyler Scheuer	Face Balancing Act	88

==== Match-Up 2: Ginger Duke vs. Christopher Joyce ====
Act	Talent	Score
Ginger Duke	Trick Riding	91
Christopher Joyce	Handstand Master	92

==== Match-Up 3: Jackie Bibby vs. David Kalb ====
Act	Talent	Score
Jackie Bibby	Snake Handler	91
David Kalb	Trick Shot	60

=== Episode 4: "Danger, Danger Everywhere" ===
Original air date: January 28, 2021 US Viewership: 0.94

==== Match-Up 1: Rider Kiesner & Bethany Iles vs. Wesley Williams ====
Act	Talent	Score
Rider Kiesner & Bethany Iles	Rope Artist	96
Wesley Williams	Box Jumper	71

==== Match-Up 2: Reckless Ben Schneider vs. Bill Dixon ====
Act	Talent	Score
Ben Schneider	Extreme Slackliner	93
Bill Dixon	Street Bike Freestyle Stunt Rider	89

==== Match-Up 3: Amina The Great vs. Leonid The Magnificent ====
Act	Talent	Score
Amina The Great	Strong Woman	79
Leonid Filatov	Circus Performer	85

=== Episode 5: "Go Out With a Bang!" ===
Original air date: February 4, 2021 US Viewership: 0.87

==== Match-Up 1: Justin the Bull Fighter vs. Sideshow Star Krystal ====
Act	Talent	Score
Justin Josey	Bullfighter	83
Krystal Kurio	Sideshow Performer	85

==== Match-Up 2: James the Archer vs. Justin the Yo-Yoer ====
Act	Talent	Score
James Jean	Redneck Archer	88
Justin Weber	Yo-Yoer	83

==== Match-Up 3: Chris the Shooter vs. Twin Motorcycle Stunts ====
Act	Talent	Score
Chris Cheng	Marksman	66
Shannon & Sawyer Schmidtman	Motorcycle Stunt Duo	65

=== Episode 6: "The Last Chance" ===
Original air date: February 11, 2021 US Viewership: 0.75

==== Match-Up 1: Zach The Sling Shooter vs. The Monster Trucker ====
Act	Talent	Score
Kevin King	Monster Truck	88
Zachary Fowler	Slingshot Marksmen	80

==== Match-Up 2: The Balance Guru vs. Scooter Trick Deijon ====
Act	Talent	Score
Deijon Taylor	Scootering	91
Travis Horn	Handstand, Balancing	86

==== Match-Up 3: Callie The Baller vs. Wayne the Mentalist ====
Act	Talent	Score
Callie Bundy	Football Trickshots	52
Wayne Hoffman	Mentalist	49

=== Episode 7:"Semifinals" ===
Original air date: February 18, 2021 US Viewership: 0.78

==== Match-Up 1: Tulga vs. Krystal vs. Deijon ====
Act	Talent	Score
Tulga	Mongolian Strong Man	95
Krystal Kurio	Sideshow Performer	90
Deijon Taylor	Scootering	91

==== Match-Up 2: Reckless Ben vs. Ben Blaque vs. Chris Cheng ====
Act	Talent	Score
Ben Schneider	Extreme Slackliner	92
Ben Blaque	Crossbow	90
Chris Cheng	Marksman	67

Tulga advanced to the finals in a 3–1 vote over Ben Schneider.

=== Episode 8:"Go Big, Fly High" ===
Original air date: February 25, 2021 US Viewership: 0.80

==== Match-Up 1: Jackie vs. Tomas vs. Gabe ====
Act	Talent	Score
Jackie Bibby	Snake Handler	90
Tomas Garcilazo	Rope Artist & Horseman	93
Gabe George	One Armed Archery	90

==== Match-Up 2: Kurtis vs. Leonid vs. Callie ====
Act	Talent	Score
Kurtis Downs	Freestyle BMX	97
Leonid Filatov	Circus Performer	85
Callie Bundy	Football Trickshots	64

Tomas Garcilazo advanced to the finals in a 3–1 vote over Kurtis Downs.

=== Episode 9:"This Show is on Fire!" ===
Original air date: March 4, 2021 US Viewership: 0.67

==== Match-Up 1: Kevin vs. Andrew vs. Orissa ====
Act	Talent	Score
Kevin King	Monster Truck	88
Andrew Stanton	Sideshow Performer	98
Orissa Kelly	Foot Archery Performer	95

==== Match-Up 2: James vs. Rider & Bethany vs. Christopher ====
Act	Talent	Score
James Jean	Redneck Archer	93
Rider Kiesner & Bethany Iles	Rope Artist	90
Christopher Joyce	Handstand Master	84

Andrew Stanton advanced to the finals in a 3–1 vote over James Jean.

Kurtis Downs received a "Wildcard" spot in the finals over James Jean and Ben Schneider.

=== Episode 10: "A Very Go Big Final" ===
Original air date: March 11, 2021 US Viewership: 0.69

==== Finale Knock Out ====
Act	Talent	Score
Kurtis Downs	Freestyle BMX	93
Tulga	Mongolian Strong Man	96
Kurtis was Eliminated
Tulga	Mongolian Strong Man	96
Andrew Stanton	Sideshow Performer	95
Andrew was Eliminated
Tulga	Mongolian Strong Man	96
Tomas Garcilazo	Rope Artist & Horseman	97

Tomas Garcilazo won the competition and the grand prize of $100,000.

== Season 2 overview (2022) ==
Similar to season one, the four judges' scores for an act are averaged to determine the overall score. Unlike the prior season, each judge's individual scores were also revealed. During the Qualifier Rounds, performers go head-to-head, and the act that receives the higher average score moves on to the next round.

Match-Up Winner

- Note: For some of the match-ups, some or all of the judges' individual scores were not shown on screen. This is indicated in the score box as "unknown".

=== Episode 1: "We're Back, Bigger Than Ever!" ===
Original air date: January 6, 2022

==== Match-Up 1: JD "Iceman" Anderson vs. Amadeus "Ironjaw" Lopez ====
Act	Talent	Judge's Score				Total Score
Act	Talent	Cody	Rosario	T-Pain	Jennifer	Total Score
JD Anderson	Strongman	91	91	94	92	92
Amadeus Lopez	Aerialist	86	89	86	84	86

==== Match-Up 2: Professor Splash vs. David Matz ====
Act	Talent	Judge's Score				Total Score
Act	Talent	Cody	Rosario	T-Pain	Jennifer	Total Score
Professor Splash	High Diving	Unknown	Unknown	Unknown	Unknown	90
David Matz	Circus Performer	Unknown	Unknown	Unknown	Unknown	85

==== Match-Up 3: James Carter vs. Molly Schuler ====
Act	Talent	Judge's Score				Total Score
Act	Talent	Cody	Rosario	T-Pain	Jennifer	Total Score
James Carter	Freestyle Motocross Rider	Unknown	Unknown	Unknown	Unknown	94
Molly Schuler	Competitive Eating	Unknown	Unknown	Unknown	Unknown	76

=== Episode 2: "Now That's What I Call Big!" ===
Original air date: January 13, 2022

==== Match-Up 1: Dare Daughter vs. Bazoo The Kloun ====
Act	Talent	Judge's Score				Total Score
Act	Talent	Cody	Rosario	T-Pain	Jennifer	Total Score
Annaliese Nock	Daredevil	92	94	96	93	94
Bazoo The Kloun	Sideshow Clown	30	68	62	70	57

==== Match-Up 2: Gladius vs. Thomas Vu ====
Act	Talent	Judge's Score				Total Score
Act	Talent	Cody	Rosario	T-Pain	Jennifer	Total Score
Gladius	Equestrian	89	89	90	87	89
Thomas Vu	Rubixcuber & Stunt Performer	93	89	95	90	92

==== Match-Up 3: Andrew Lee vs. Joe "Axe Man" White ====
Act	Talent	Judge's Score				Total Score
Act	Talent	Cody	Rosario	T-Pain	Jennifer	Total Score
Andrew Lee	Illusionist	89	88	90	92	90
Joe White	Axe Thrower	75	78	65	79	74

=== Episode 3: "Bulls, Balls and Falls" ===
Original air date: January 20, 2022

==== Match-Up 1: Jon "Divine Strength" Bruney vs. Manu "Flying Frenchman" Lataste ====
Act	Talent	Judge's Score				Total Score
Act	Talent	Cody	Rosario	T-Pain	Jennifer	Total Score
Manu Lataste	Bull Leaping	94	95	97	96	95
Jon Bruney	Strongman	93	93	95	92	93

==== Match-Up 2: Horse vs. Charles Peachock ====
Act	Talent	Judge's Score				Total Score
Act	Talent	Cody	Rosario	T-Pain	Jennifer	Total Score
Horse	Nutshot Taker	Unknown	Unknown	Unknown	Unknown	88
Charles Peachock	Juggler	83	85	72	90	82

==== Match-Up 3: Dariella & Elena vs. Jose Angeles ====
Act	Talent	Judge's Score				Total Score
Act	Talent	Cody	Rosario	T-Pain	Jennifer	Total Score
Dariella & Elena	Aerialist	90	93	90	91	91
Jose Angeles	Freerunner	91	91	92	93	92

=== Episode 4: "No Pain, No Gain" ===
Original air date: January 27, 2022

==== Match-Up 1: Zavell 'Zero Gravity' Perry vs. Anastasia Synn ====
Act	Talent	Judge's Score				Total Score
Act	Talent	Cody	Rosario	T-Pain	Jennifer	Total Score
Zavell Perry	Stunt Tumbler	89	94	93	92	92
Anastasia Synn	Sideshow Performer	92	95	90	95	93

==== Match-Up 2: Jonathan "Rolla Bolla" Rinny vs. Leroy Patterson ====
Act	Talent	Judge's Score				Total Score
Act	Talent	Cody	Rosario	T-Pain	Jennifer	Total Score
Jonathan Rinny	Rolla Bolla	80	84	73	80	79
Leroy Patterson	Stunt Wrestler	2	50	40	60	38

==== Match-Up 3: Christopher & Stephanie vs. Kamikaze Kid ====
Act	Talent	Total Score
Christopher & Stephanie	Hair Aerialists	Withdrew
Kamikaze Kid	Stunt Performer	Won By Default

=== Episode 5: "This Is Definitely Not Child's Play" ===
Original air date: February 3, 2022

==== Match-Up 1: The Amazing Sladek vs. Beaver Fleming ====
Act	Talent	Judge's Score				Total Score
Act	Talent	Cody	Rosario	T-Pain	Jennifer	Total Score
The Amazing Sladek	Daredevil Acrobat	91	88	90	94	91
Beaver Fleming	Skateboarder	89	66	65	79	75

==== Match-Up 2: Rob Lake vs. Andrew Parker ====
Act	Talent	Judge's Score				Total Score
Act	Talent	Cody	Rosario	T-Pain	Jennifer	Total Score
Rob Lake	Illusionist	87	80	90	90	87
Andrew Parker	Escape Artist	89	86	90	91	89

==== Match-Up 3: Tori Boggs vs. Anthony Nevarez ====
Act	Talent	Judge's Score				Total Score
Act	Talent	Cody	Rosario	T-Pain	Jennifer	Total Score
Tori Boggs	Jump Roper	Unknown	Unknown	Unknown	Unknown	94
Anthony Nevarez	Fire Dancer	85	86	86	82	85

=== Episode 6: "One Last Shot" ===
Original air date: February 10, 2022

==== Match-Up 1: Lina Liu vs. Mike 'Mind Boss' Gillette ====
Act	Talent	Judge's Score				Total Score
Act	Talent	Cody	Rosario	T-Pain	Jennifer	Total Score
Lina Liu	Umbrella Acrobat	87	90	86	89	88
Mike Gillette	Strongman	87	87	85	87	86

==== Match-Up 2: Dane Beardsley vs. Kevin 'Iron Hands' Taylor ====
Act	Talent	Judge's Score				Total Score
Act	Talent	Cody	Rosario	T-Pain	Jennifer	Total Score
Kevin Taylor	Strongman	90	94	92	91	92
Dane Beardsley	BMX Flatland Rider	78	89	80	88	84

==== Match-Up 3: Fernando Velasco vs. Jefrick 'Knife Ninja' Barrios ====
Act	Talent	Judge's Score				Total Score
Act	Talent	Cody	Rosario	T-Pain	Jennifer	Total Score
Fernando Velasco	Magician	Unknown	Unknown	Unknown	Unknown	82
Jefrick Barrios	Knife Throwing	Unknown	Unknown	Unknown	Unknown	67

=== Episode 7:"Time To Raise The Game" ===
Original air date: February 17, 2022

==== Match-Up 1: Manu Lataste vs. Kamikaze Kid vs. Andrew Parker ====
Act	Talent	Judge's Score				Total Score
Act	Talent	Cody	Rosario	T-Pain	Jennifer	Total Score
Manu Lataste	Bull Leaping	97	96	97	97	97
Kamikaze Kid	Stunt Performer	87	83	86	82	84
Andrew Parker	Escape Artist	90	84	87	83	86

==== Match-Up 2: Daredaughter vs. Jose Angeles vs. Kevin Taylor ====
Act	Talent	Judge's Score				Total Score
Act	Talent	Cody	Rosario	T-Pain	Jennifer	Total Score
Annaliese Nock	Daredevil	98	95	96	98	97
Jose Angeles	Freerunner	92	99	97	95	96
Kevin Taylor	Strongman	92	95	95	93	94

Manu advanced to the finals in a 3–1 vote over Annaliese Nock.

=== Episode 8:"It's A Wild, Wild Semifinal" ===
Original air date: February 24, 2022

==== Match-Up 1: James Carter vs. Tori Boggs vs. The Amazing Sladek ====
Act	Talent	Judge's Score				Total Score
Act	Talent	Cody	Rosario	T-Pain	Jennifer	Total Score
James Carter	Freestyle Motocross Rider	97	100	97	96	97
Tori Boggs	Jump Roper	93	95	95	93	94
The Amazing Sladek	Daredevil Acrobat	94	91	90	94	92

==== Match-Up 2: Horse vs. Lina Liu vs. Fernando Velasco ====
Act	Talent	Judge's Score				Total Score
Act	Talent	Cody	Rosario	T-Pain	Jennifer	Total Score
Horse	Nutshot Taker	92	97	96	90	94
Lina Liu	Umbrella Acrobat	95	96	94	95	95
Fernando Velasco	Magician	92	89	92	90	91

James Carter advanced to the finals in a 3–1 vote over Lina Liu.

=== Episode 9:"It's Never Been Closer" ===
Original air date: March 3, 2022

==== Match-Up 1: Thomas Vu vs. JD Anderson vs. Jonathan Rinny ====
Act	Talent	Judge's Score				Total Score
Act	Talent	Cody	Rosario	T-Pain	Jennifer	Total Score
Thomas Vu	Rubixcuber & Stunt Performer					96
JD Anderson	Strongman					96
Jonathan Rinny	Rolla Bolla	94	99	97	95	96

Thomas was eliminated due to having a combing score of 383, while JD and Jonathan once again tied with a combined score of 385. JD advanced due to having a higher score in the Qualifier round.

==== Match-Up 1: Professor Splash vs. Andrew Lee vs. Anastasia Synn ====
Act	Talent	Judge's Score				Total Score
Act	Talent	Cody	Rosario	T-Pain	Jennifer	Total Score
Professor Splash	High Diving	96	97	94	95	95
Andrew Lee	Illusionist	93	90	96	90	92
Anastasia Synn	Sideshow Performer	80	89	82	85	84

Professor Splash advanced to the finals in a 3-0 vote over JD Anderson. Cody didn't vote given Professor Splash already had the majority vote.

Annaliese Nock received a "Wildcard" spot in the finals over Lina Liu and JD Anderson.

=== Episode 10: "Only One Can Win - The Finale" ===
Original air date: March 10, 2022

==== Finale Knock Out ====
Act	Talent	Judge's Score				Total Score
Act	Talent	Cody	Rosario	T-Pain	Jennifer	Total Score
James Carter	Freestyle Motocross Rider	98	95	96	96	96
Annaliese Nock	Daredevil	99	98	97	97	98
James Carter was Eliminated
Annaliese Nock	Daredevil	98				
Professor Splash	High Diving	98	100	99	99	99
Annaliese Nock was Eliminated
Professor Splash	High Diving	99				
Manu Lataste	Bull Leaping	99	100	100	100	100

Manu Lataste won the competition and the grand prize of $100,000.

== Season 1 acts (2021) ==
Season 1 featured 36 different acts.

Winner | Runner-up | Finalist Wild Card

Act Elimination Chart
Act	Talent	Elimination
Grace Good	Circus Performer	Qualifier Round
Scott Anderson	Magician	Qualifier Round
Jamie Keeton	Human Mutant	Qualifier Round
The Gator Crusader	Alligator Act	Qualifier Round
Wheelz	Wheelchair Motocross	Qualifier Round
Cassidy Rose	Country Singeing & Yodeling	Qualifier Round
Tyler Scheuer	Face Balancing Act	Qualifier Round
Ginger Duke	Trick Riding	Qualifier Round
David Kalb	Trick Shot	Qualifier Round
Wesley Williams	Box Jumper	Qualifier Round
Bill Dixon	Street Bike Freestyle Stunt Rider	Qualifier Round
Amina The Great	Strong Woman	Qualifier Round
Justin Josey	Bullfighter	Qualifier Round
Justin Weber	Yo-Yoer	Qualifier Round
Shannon & Sawyer Schmidtman	Motorcycle Stunt Duo	Qualifier Round
Zachary Fowler	Slingshot Marksmen	Qualifier Round
Travis Horn	Handstand, Balancing	Qualifier Round
Wayne Hoffman	Mentalist	Qualifier Round
Deijon Taylor	Scootering	Semi-Finals
Krystal Kurio	Sideshow Performer	Semi-Finals
Ben Blaque	Crossbow	Semi-Finals
Chris Cheng	Marksman	Semi-Finals
Gabe George	One Armed Archery	Semi-Finals
Jackie Bibby	Snake Handler	Semi-Finals
Leonid Filatov	Circus Performer	Semi-Finals
Callie Bundy	Football Trickshots	Semi-Finals
Orissa Kelly	Foot Archery Performer	Semi-Finals
Christopher Joyce	Handstand Master	Semi-Finals
Rider Kiesner & Bethany Iles	Rope Artist	Semi-Finals
Kevin King	Monster Truck	Semi-Finals
Ben Schneider	Extreme Slackliner	Semi-Finals Judge Vote
James Jean	Redneck Archer	Semi-Finals Judge Vote
Andrew Stanton	Sideshow Performer	Finalist
Kurtis Downs	Freestyle BMX	Finalist
Tulga	Mongolian Strong Man	Runner-Up
Tomas Garcilazo	Rope Artist & Horseman	Winner

=== List of notable appearances of acts ===
Many acts from the show have appeared in prior sports events and/or talent competitions.

==== Sports events and competitions ====
- Aaron Fotheringham also known as Wheelz, has been a part of Nitro Circus since 2010; touring and completing various records, including four wins at the WCMX World Championships.
- Chris Cheng won the fourth season of Top Shot.
- Kurtis Downs has competed at 2017 and 2019 X Games placing 3rd and 6th in BMX Big Air respectfully. He is also a member of Nitro Circus.

==== Talent competition ====
- Andrew Stanton appeared on season 5 of America’s Got Talent as a part of Swing Shift Side Show being eliminated during the Wild Card show.
- Ben Blaque has appeared on four different Got Talent franchises; including season 7 of America’s Got Talent as a quarter-finalist, series 10 of Britain's Got Talent as a semifinalist, season 2 of America’s Got Talent: The Champions and La France a un incroyable talent: Battle of the Judges.
- Leonid Filatov, better known as Leonid the Magnificent, has appeared on America's Got Talent on three occasions, season 1 being eliminated in the semifinals and in season 2 and season 6 being eliminated in the Vegas Round. He also competed in season 10 of La France a un incroyable talent and season 6 of Česko Slovensko má talent.
- Orissa Kelly appeared on series 10 of Britain's Got Talent, she also appeared and won Amazingness.
- Scott Anderson appeared on season 5 of America's Got Talent (being eliminated in the Vegas Round) and Wizard Wars.
- Tulga has appeared on various Got Talent shows including season 12 of America’s Got Talent, season 13 of France’s Got Incredible Talent, season 9 of Australia's Got Talent, season 12 of Das Supertalent and series 8 of Česko Slovensko má talent. He has also appeared on other talent competition shows, including the fifth edition of Tú sí que vales and season six of IUmor.
- Wayne Hoffman appeared on the third season of Penn & Teller: Fool Us where he successfully fooled Penn & Teller. He has also appeared on season 10 of America’s Got Talent and Phenomenon.

== Season 2 acts (2022) ==
Season 2 featured 36 different acts.

Winner | Runner-up | Finalist Wild Card

Act	Talent	Elimination
Amadeus Lopez	Aerialist	Qualifier Round
David Matz	Circus Performer	Qualifier Round
Molly Schuler	Competitive Eating	Qualifier Round
Bazoo The Kloun	Sideshow Clown	Qualifier Round
Gladius	Equestrian	Qualifier Round
Joe White	Axe Thrower	Qualifier Round
Jon Bruney	Strongman	Qualifier Round
Charles Peachock	Juggler	Qualifier Round
Dariella & Elena	Aerialist	Qualifier Round
Zavell Perry	Stunt Tumbler	Qualifier Round
Leroy Patterson	Stunt Wrestler	Qualifier Round
Beaver Fleming	Skateboarder	Qualifier Round
Rob Lake	Illusionist	Qualifier Round
Anthony Nevarez	Fire Dancer	Qualifier Round
Mike Gillette	Strongman	Qualifier Round
Dane Beardsley	BMX Flatland Rider	Qualifier Round
Jefrick Barrios	Knife Throwing	Qualifier Round
Christopher & Stephanie	Hair Aerialists	Withdrew
Kamikaze Kid	Stunt Performer	Semi-Finals
Andrew Parker	Escape Artist	Semi-Finals
Kevin Taylor	Strongman	Semi-Finals
Jose Angeles	Freerunner	Semi-Finals
Tori Boggs	Jump Roper	Semi-Finals
The Amazing Sladek	Daredevil Acrobat	Semi-Finals
Fernando Velasco	Magician	Semi-Finals
Horse	Nutshot Taker	Semi-Finals
Thomas Vu	Rubixcuber & Stunt Performer	Semi-Finals
Jonathan Rinny	Rolla Bolla	Semi-Finals
Andrew Lee	Illusionist	Semi-Finals
Anastasia Synn	Sideshow Performer	Semi-Finals
Lina Liu	Umbrella Acrobat	Semi-Finals Judge Vote
JD Anderson	Strongman	Semi-Finals Judge Vote
James Carter	Freestyle Motocross Rider	Finalist
Annaliese Nock	Daredevil	Finalist
Professor Splash	High Diving	Runner-Up
Manu Lataste	Bull Leaping	Winner

=== List of notable appearances of acts ===
Many acts from the show have appeared in prior sports events and/or talent competitions.

==== Talent competition ====
- JD Anderson appeared on season 9 of America's Got Talent where he was eliminated in the quarterfinals.
- Professor Splash appeared on season 6 of America's Got Talent where he was eliminated in the semifinals.
- Annaliese Nock appeared on season 13 of America's Got Talent where she withdrew prior to the Judge Cuts and season 15 with her father Bello who were eliminated in the quarterfinals.
- Andrew Lee appeared on season 2 of Asia's Got Talent where he was eliminated in the semifinals and series 12 of Britain's Got Talent where he was eliminated in the deliberations.
- Horse appeared on season 7 of America's Got Talent where he was eliminated in the quarterfinals but returned for the wildcard round where he was eliminated again.
- Charles Peachock appeared on season 6 of America's Got Talent where he was eliminated in the quarterfinals but returned for the wildcard round where he was eliminated again.
- Jonathan Rinny appeared on season 12 of America's Got Talent where he was eliminated in the Judge Cuts.
- Kevin Taylor appeared on season 3 of America's Got Talent where he was eliminated in the Vegas Round.
- Rob Lake appeared on season 13 of America's Got Talent where he was eliminated in the quarterfinals.
- Leroy Patterson appeared on season 10 of America's Got Talent where he was eliminated in the Judge Cuts. He also competed on the 2nd season of the Fox Reality Channel game show Solitary, where he was the 3rd player eliminated.

== Production ==
The show is filmed at the Macon Coliseum in Macon, Georgia, via Propagate and Boat Rocker Media's Matador Content. Production for the 10-episode hour-long second season began in August 2021.

== Ratings and reviews ==
The debut episode drew a million viewers and was the best unscripted series launch by TBS in three years. Viewership declined slightly each week during the first season. However, due to its success, the series was renewed for a second season.

Common Sense Media reported it is a "mixed-bag of talent" featuring profanity and mild violence meant for mature audiences, along with family-friendly performances. The positive impact on younger viewers is the discussion of safety and the unique talents of the performers.
