= Professor Powsey =

English pier diver and entertainer

Professor (Albert Edward 'Bert') Powsey
- Postcard of Powsey's bicycle dive from Brighton's West Pier, in 1905
- Born: 1866; Sheerness, Kent, England
- Died: 2 March, 1956; Liverpool
- Occupation: High diver
- Years active: 1900–1941

Albert Edward 'Bert' Powsey (1866–1956), known professionally as Professor Powsey, was a British high diver active between 1900 and 1941.

Powsey was among a number of similar professional high, trick and fancy daredevil divers who performed for crowds on piers and at fairgrounds throughout the UK in the early 20th century. These include Professor Cyril, Professor Gautier, Professor Davenport, Professor Reddish, Zoe Brigden, Walter Tong, and Powsey's own daughter Gladys and son Herbert Powsey.

== Early life ==
Powsey was born in 1866 in Sheerness, Kent. At the age of 13 he embarked on a six-month cruise to the West Indies on a cargo boat and on his return was assistant to a grocer. On 7 September 1880, at 14, he received a Royal Humane Society Bronze Medal for lifesaving as "A. E. Powsey, 'Boy, T S Cornwall" (case number 21075). The T. S. Cornwall, formerly HMS Wellesley, had been a 74-gun ship of the line converted to a floating reformatory or training ship. Powsey apprenticed as a steam pipe fitter, eventually becoming a foreman.

In 1890 he married Rose Emma Ellis, who had been touring the world as the first female deep-sea diver. At the time of their marriage Powsey joined the staff of Marlborough College in Wiltshire for 10 years, and there evolved his high diving act.

== Diving career ==
Powsey first undertook regular diving routines on the Herne Bay Pier for several seasons around the turn of the century. During this time he trained his daughter Gladys and son Herbert. Offered facilities at Brighton's West Pier, he left Herne Bay, leaving son Herbert to perform regularly there.

From Brighton he then moved to Clacton-on-Sea, and then in 1908 to Southport Pier, where he performed three dives daily until 1936, apart from a two-year absence during which he made a world tour.

After Southport pier he took to diving at the Southport fair ground/pleasureland.

Online postcard, photographic and film evidence shows that as well as being a regular diving performer at a given location (for example Southport Pier), he also made excursions to dive elsewhere around the country.

== Dives ==
Powsey's diving routines included the 'Terrible Cycle Dive', which involved cycling off a ramp positioned above the pier deck. Another was the Sack Dive, in which he dived in a sack, and the 'Sensational Dive in Flames' in which he either was placed in a sack with cotton wool affixed and then doused with petrol set alight just before jumping, or dived into water with petrol on the surface that was set alight. He also dived from an 80-foot tower into a tank with four feet of water. In Southport he offered to dive from an aeroplane at 150 feet but was refused permission.

Powsey made his final dive at the age of 75 in 1941 at a gala in Southport for the Soldiers', Sailors' and Airmen's Charity Funds, and retired at his home in Virginia Street, Southport. He died in 1956.

== Recollections and legacy ==
Among the divers' spectators was a young A. J. P. Taylor, who was born in Southport and recalled Saturday visits to its Pleasureland with his father to watch a "deep sea diver called Professor Powsey, who performed spectacular dives which included one on a blazing bicycle".

In 2014, Powsey's grandson Albert recollected watching the dives as a schoolboy, and recalled the following from when he was 11 or 12:

I remember watching and there being a huge crowd of people around. My grandfather would often dive into a small pool and people would wonder why they could not get closer. I remember he would call out "Are you ready, ladies and gentlemen?" Then, as he was about to leap you could hear the intake of breath as everyone gasped, almost as if they did not believe he was going to do it. Then he would plunge down into the water and it would splash out all around him – and that is why they couldn't stand any closer, because they would have got soaked.

'Real photo' postcards of Professor Powsey and contemporary stunt divers are bought, sold and collected to this day, and can be searched and found on online auctions or articles.

On Southport Pier there is a statue of Professor Powsey diving, astride a bicycle.

== See also ==
- Roy Fransen
- Flying the Foam
- Professor Splash
- Diving horse
