= Gabriel George =

- Known for: Paralympics, Archery, Volunteerism
- Website: https://worldarchery.sport/profile/24022/gabriel-george/biography

Gabriel “Gabe” George is a medically retired U.S. Navy Corpsman and an American Paralympic athlete.

== Military career ==
George joined the Navy in July 2005 as a corpsman. His first deployment included bringing him to the Mediterranean, Israel, Haifa, Greece, Croatia, Europe, and Turkey; the second was to Guantanamo Bay, Cuba. He was medically retired in 2009 as a result of the injuries from his motorcycle accident

== Archery ==
In 2018, George was introduced to adaptive sports through the National Veterans Summer Sports Clinic in San Diego, where a Paralympic coach demonstrated how he could fire a bow using string—he went to buy a bow the next day. Soon George was looking to compete, participating in paralympic competitions while aiming to be included on Team USA. His dedication to the sport has led to participation in the 2019 DOD Warrior Games for Team Navy, candidacy for the Tokyo Paralympics in 2020 (prior to its cancellation), and an invitation to the Invictus Games in 2022 for Team USA.

== Advocacy ==
=== Medical marijuana ===
Because of his motorcycle accident, George suffers from chronic pain due to nerve damage. His neurologist was the first to suggest medical marijuana as a potential treatment for the side effects of his pharmaceutical regimen. George has expressed that taking the drug improves his quality of life, combating the chronic pain while also not adding any side-effects

== Appearances ==
In 2019 George was a feature interviewee on the Making Good episode Veterans Oceans Adventures, aired by the BYUtv channel.

George was a contestant on the American Go Big Show, appearing for the first time on January 14, 2021 as a contestant on the episode “You Can’t Unsee This!” After earning the high score in his match-up, he moved on to be a semi-finalist and appeared a second time on February 25’s episode “Go Big, Fly High.”
