= Shallow diving =

Extreme sport

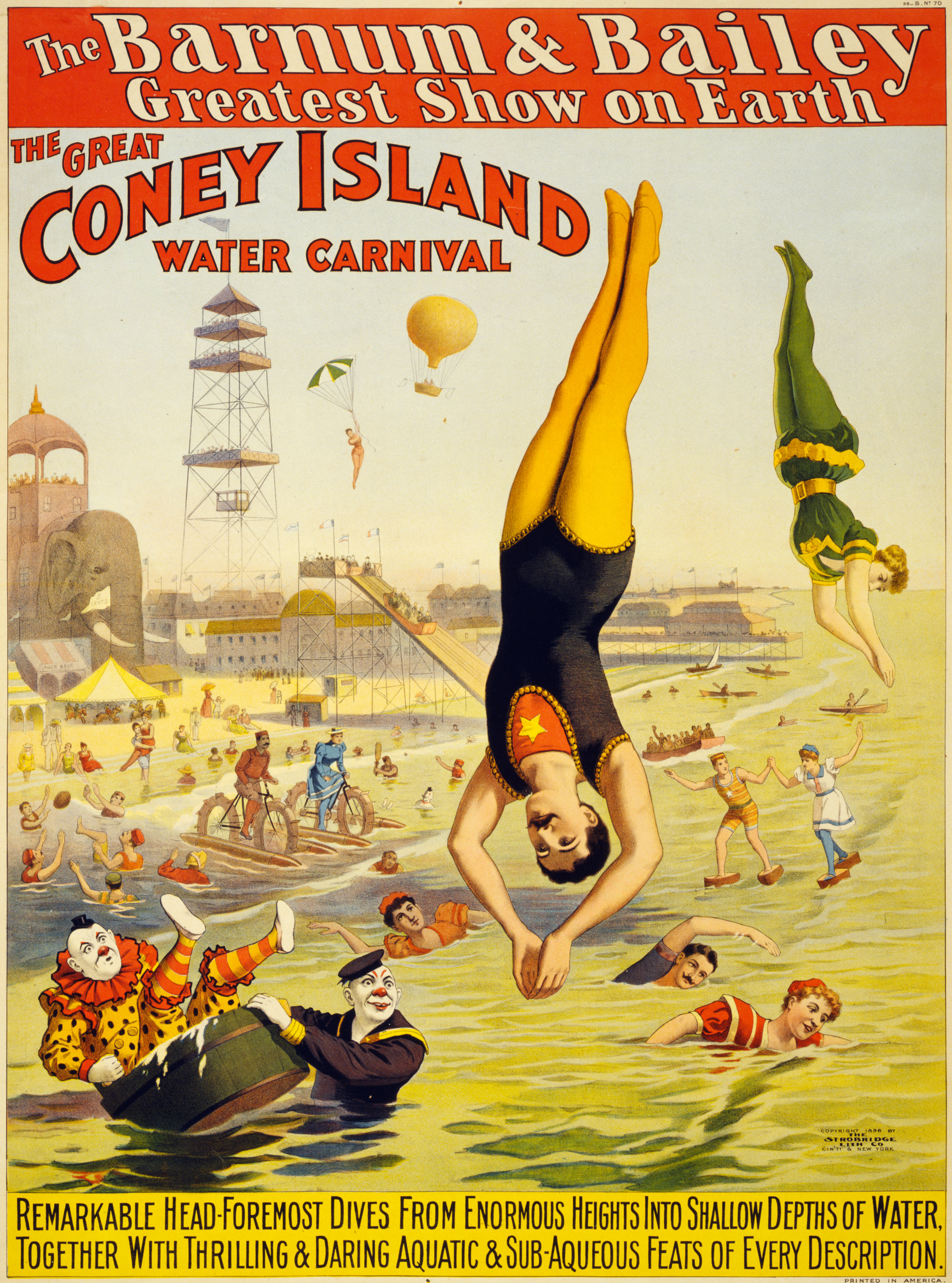
Circus poster, c. 1898, advertising "Remarkable Head-Foremost Dives From Enormous Heights Into Shallow Depths of Water"

Shallow diving is an extreme sport, whereby enthusiasts attempt to dive from the greatest height into the shallowest depth of water, without sustaining injury. It is typically associated with traveling circuses along with the strongman, performing animals, clowns and other such attractions.

== Technique ==
Divers aim to hit the water horizontally in a manner akin to the belly flop. This spreads the impact over the greatest surface area, and achieves the longest time decelerating, before hitting the bottom of the container where the water is held.

== World records ==
- Professor Splash (ne. Darren Taylor) successfully dove from 37.8 feet (11.52 m) into a paddling pool of depth 1 foot (30 cm) breaking his record for a successive 20th time.
- Professor Powsey dove successfully from an 80-foot (24 m) tower into a tank with 4 feet (1.2 m) of water.
- Roy Fransen successfully dove from 108 feet (32.9 m) into 8 feet (2.4 m) of water.
