= The Amazing Johnathan Documentary =

- Poster
- Directed by: Ben Berman
- Written by: Ben Berman
- Edited by: Scott Evans
- Production companies: Anonymous Content; Cold Iron Pictures; Horse Horse Horse
- Release date: January 25, 2019 (Sundance Film Festival)
- Country: United States
- Language: English

The Amazing Johnathan Documentary is a 2019 documentary film, directed by Ben Berman.

== Cast ==
- The Amazing Johnathan as himself
- Eric André as himself
- Benjamin Berman as himself
- Simon Chinn as himself
- Judy Gold as herself
- Penn Jillette as himself
- Max Maven as himself
- Jon Mugar as himself
- Chadd Smith as himself
- Anastasia Synn as herself
- Doreen Szeles as herself
- Doug Szeles as himself
- Chad S. Taylor as himself
- Carrot Top as himself
- "Weird Al" Yankovic as himself

== Reception ==
On the review aggregator Rotten Tomatoes, the film holds an approval rating of 80% based on 41 reviews, and an average rating of 7/10. The website's critical consensus reads, "The Amazing Johnathan Documentary sets out to survey a magician's final tour -- and ends up pulling off some wildly ambitious tricks of its own." Metacritic, which uses a weighted average, assigned the film a score of 52 out of 100, based on 13 critics, indicating "Mixed or average reviews".

Peter Debruge writing for Variety wrote, "Berman eventually does prove to be rather resourceful, pulling off a coup that surprises even Johnathan in the end — and that’s no easy trick". John DeFore of The Hollywood Reporter wrote, "Ben Berman's Untitled Amazing Johnathan Documentary offers a helpful reminder to aspiring doc-makers out there: There's more to the job than just following someone around with a camera".
