= David Lebuser =

German wheelchair athlete and WCMX pioneer

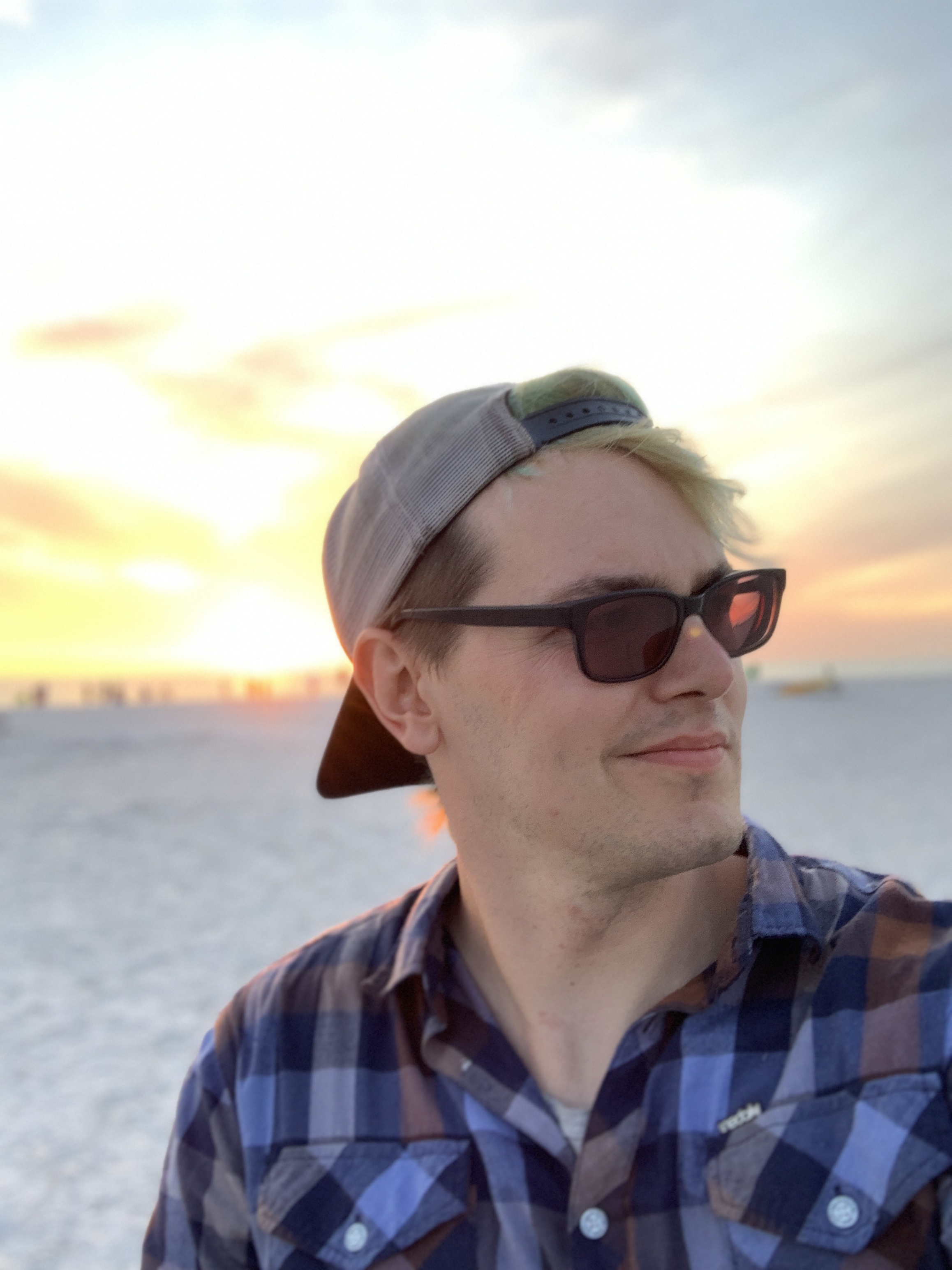
- David Lebuser

Personal information
- Nickname: Dat Lebbe
- Nationality: German
- Born: September 12, 1986 (age 39) Frankfurt (Oder), Bezirk Frankfurt, East Germany
- Height: 1.96 m (6 ft 5 in)
- Website: http://www.sitnskate.de

Sport
- Country: Germany
- Sport: WCMX

David Lebuser (born September 12, 1986, in Frankfurt (Oder), East Germany) is a German extreme wheelchair athlete. He was the first professional wheelchair skater in Germany. Apart from riding WCMX, which is adapted from skateboarding and BMX, he also hosts WCMX workshops for other wheelchair users in Germany. At the age of 21, he became paralysed from the waist down (L3) after he fell into a stairwell.

== Early life and education ==
Lebuser grew up in Frankfurt (Oder) in Brandenburg, Germany. After primary education, he went to a sports school in Frankfurt (Oder) and graduated from a secondary school in 2003. He worked as a painter and later attended sixth form. Before moving to Berlin in 2010, he worked as a customer consultant. He did several internships since, including in Helsinki, Finland.

== Accident and rehabilitation ==
On 28 August 2008, Lebuser broke his back after falling into a stairwell, two floors down. He tried to slide down a handrail after a friend's birthday. He has a spinal cord injury from the waist down (first lumbar vertebra fracture). During his time at the hospital and his rehabilitation the 2008 Summer Paralympics in Beijing took place, so he soon realised that there was more to do than getting pushed around in a chair. While still in hospital a friend showed Lebuser a YouTube video of Aaron Fotheringham doing a wheelchair backflip, which inspired him to go to skate parks and start wheelchair skating. He also started playing wheelchair basketball soon after rehabilitation.

== Professional life ==
Since 2012, Lebuser competes in the WCMX World Championships, also known as Life Rolls On "They Will Skate Again" in Venice, California every year. In 2013, he placed third in the WCMX division and fifth in all divisions. In 2012, he placed fifth. 2014 he won the category "Best Overall Run" in the wheelchair section.

In 2013, Lebuser began hosting WCMX workshops for other wheelchair users across Germany, as he was previously the only wheelchair skater in the country. He also created an action sports division at the German Wheelchair Sports Association (DRS).

Lebuser uses a customized WCMX chair from Jumper Equipamentos in Brazil for skating. The chair features four-wheel suspension and is sturdier than everyday wheelchairs, enabling him to perform the same tricks as skateboarders and BMX riders, with the suspension cushioning his landings.
