= Myq Kaplan =

American stand-up comedian

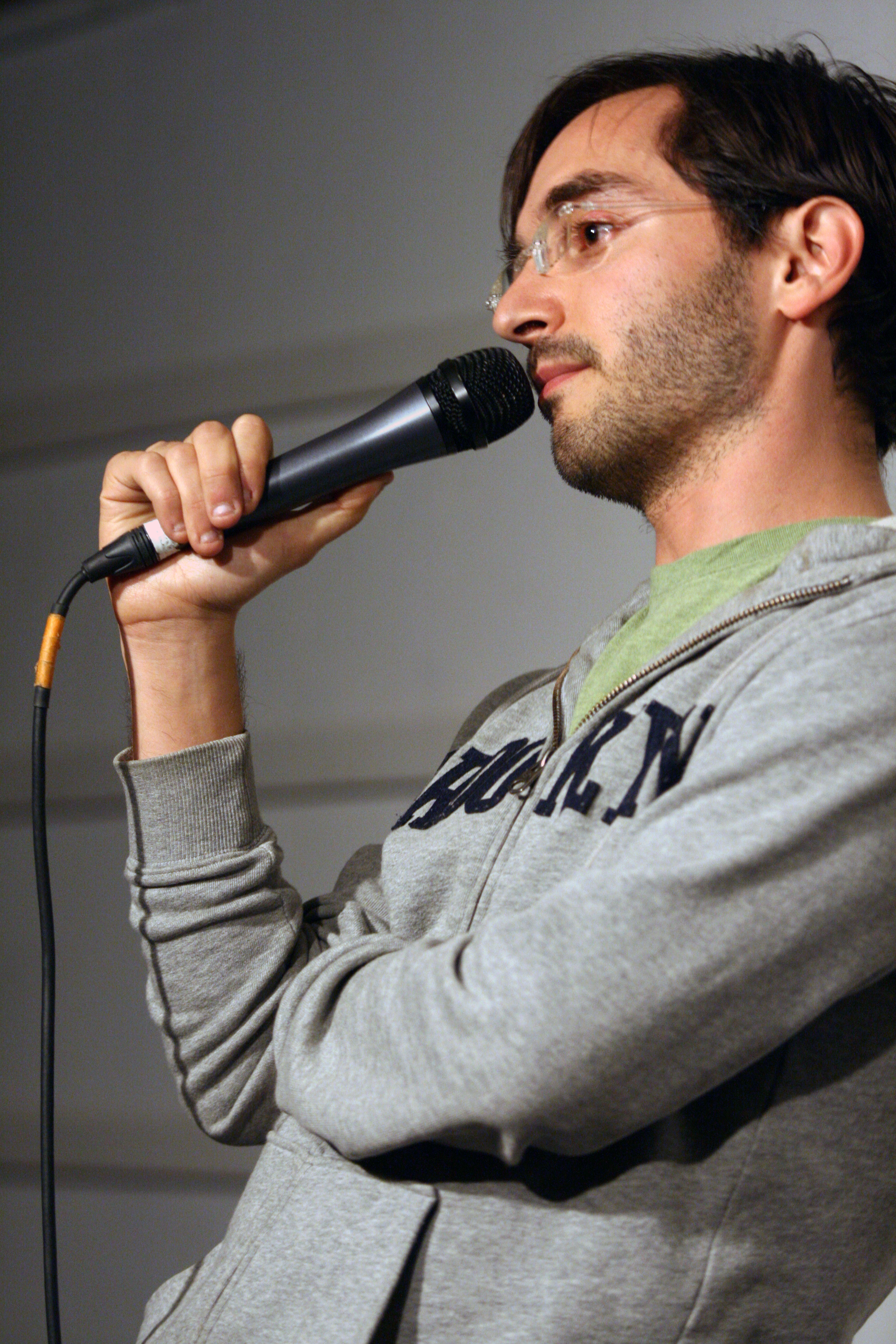
- Kaplan performing at Meltdown Comics in Hollywood, California, December 2011
- Born: Michael Kaplan; October 7, 1978 (age 47); Livingston, New Jersey

Comedy career
- Years active: 2005–present
- Medium: Stand-up comedian
- Website: myqkaplan.com

Myq Kaplan (/maɪk/; born October 7, 1978) is an American stand-up comedian. Born Michael Kaplan in Livingston, New Jersey, he works out of Boston and New York City.

== Education ==
Kaplan received his bachelor's degree from Brandeis University in Waltham, Massachusetts in 2000, and a master's degree in linguistics from Boston University in Boston. While a student at Boston University in 2005, he won the "funniest student" contest.

== Comedy career ==
Kaplan tours North America and has performed over 1,000 shows at comedy clubs. He was a semifinalist in the 2006 Boston Comedy Festival and in the 2006 Seattle Comedy Competition. He was one of nine finalists in Comedy Central's 2007 Open Mic Fight competition. In 2008, a reader poll by The Phoenix, a Boston newspaper, named him Local Comedian of the Year. He took part in Montreal's Just for Laughs comedy festival in 2009.

=== Television, internet, and recordings ===
Myq Kaplan has appeared on Comedy Central's Live at Gotham, in promos for CC, and on Netflix. He has been featured on ABC News Now. On December 16, 2009, he performed for the first time on The Tonight Show. Kaplan also was a contestant on the competition TV series Last Comic Standing during the summer of 2010 and placed fifth.

He is also a frequent guest on long running comedy podcast Keith and the Girl. He has been a guest on the "Comedy Bang! Bang!" podcast four times, #110 (June 27, 2011), #658 (May 31, 2020), #818 (June 26, 2023) and #943 (November 24, 2025). He has been a guest on the podcast "You Made It Weird With Pete Holmes" 2 times, one released on April 4, 2012, and as a returning guest released December 20, 2017. Kaplan hosts his own podcast Hang Out with Me.

On April 30, 2010, his Comedy Central Presents special aired on Comedy Central. His comedy album Vegan Mind Meld came out on April 27, 2010, and his second album, Please Be Seated, was released in 2012. In August 2014, his one-hour standup special entitled Small, Dork, and Handsome appeared on Netflix for streaming. On January 31, he was the first guest on Bombing with Mike Dorval, where he talked about his joke writing and a joke that bombed for The New York Times. He was also a contestant on the tenth season of America's Got Talent making it to the Quarterfinals.

== Personal life ==
Kaplan is a musician, primarily a guitarist and vocalist. He is a vegan, polyamorous, and has said he is "atheistic". However in a 2016 podcast, he elaborated, saying that he became more spiritual through using psychedelics.

== Discography ==
=== Comedy albums ===
- Vegan Mind Meld (2010, BSeenMedia)
- Meat Robot (2013, Comedy Central Records)
- Small, Dork, and Handsome (2014, Comedy Dynamics)
- No Kidding (2017, Aspecialthing Records)
- Live in Between Albums (2018, Blonde Medicine)
- A.K.A. (2020, Blonde Medicine)
- Live in Between Albums 2: Rocky Mountain Hi! (2022, Blonde Medicine)
- Rini (2025, Blonde Medicine)

=== Music albums ===
- Please Be Seated w/ Micah Sherman (2012, BSeenMedia)
- Many Mini Musics (2016, My Grandfather Was A Spy)

=== Podcast albums ===
- The Best of Super Hang, Vol. 1 (2014, Keith and The Girl)
- The Long Shot Season 3 - Episode #318: "Road Trips (feat. Myq Kaplan)" (2015)

=== EPs ===
- The Micah Myq Mega Mixtape w/ Micah Sherman (2014, Bandcamp, 9-tracks)

=== Singles ===
- The Micah Myq Mega Mixtape w/ Micah Sherman (2016, BSeenMedia, 3-tracks)

=== Compilation appearances ===
- Comedy Death-Ray Xmas CD 2010 (2010) - Track 3: "How Hitler Saved Christmas"
- Live from Jamestown: Latenight @ Lucy Comedy Fest 2013 (2014) - Track 14: "The Fast & Furious"
- The Comedy Holiday Album (2017) - Track 10: "Merry Passover"
- Just for Laughs: Premium, Vol. 26 (2018) - Track 10: "Children (Jfl 2015)"
- Just for Laughs: Funny AF, Vol. 6 (2019) - Track 13: "My Demographic (Jfl 2012)"

== Film and television appearances ==
=== Films ===
- JK LOL (Short, 2009) - Himself
- Broken Mike (2012) - Himself
- Like Me (2014) - Himself
- Welcome to Bridgetown (2015) - Himself
- Punching Henry (2016) - Zack
- Off Stage: Myq Kaplan (2017) - Himself
- Tasteless (2018) - Himself

=== TV series ===
- Louie (2010) - Myq Kaplan
- Comedy Bang! Bang! (2015) - Lenny
- The Comedy Show Show (2016) - Mitch Hedberg
- Who Is? (2016) - Voice
- Giving Up (2017) - Wake Performer
- Tales from the Trip (2019) - Himself
- Comedy Central Originals: High School Fails (2019) - Himself
- Broadway Comedy Club Presents (2020) - Contestant/Comic
- Mystery Mansion (2021) - Eyeball

=== Comedy specials ===
- Comedy Central Presents (2010, Comedy Central)
- Small, Dork, and Handsome (2014, Comedy Dynamics/Netflix)
- Live from the Universe (2021, Dry Bar Comedy)
- I Got Punched for These Jokes (2025, Dry Bar Comedy)
- Rini (2025, Blonde Medicine)

=== Stand-up appearances ===
- Live at Gotham (1 episode, 2008)
- The Tonight Show with Conan O'Brien (1 episode, 2009)
- Last Comic Standing (1 episode, 2010)
- The Late Late Show with Craig Ferguson (4 episodes, 2010–13)
- Late Show with David Letterman (2 episodes, 2011–12)
- Conan (5 episodes, 2011–17)
- Funny As Hell (1 episode, 2012)
- Late Night with Seth Meyers (1 episode, 2014)
- Just for Laughs (1 episode, 2015)
- America's Got Talent (3 episodes, 2015)
- The Late Late Show with James Corden (1 episode, 2017)
- Paste Magazine (1 video, 2018)

== Videography ==
=== Comedy animations ===
- Jews and Sea Creatures (2010)
- Axes and Brains (2014)
- Highs and Lose (2014)
- Nothing, Everything, and Eddie Murphy (2017)
- A Meditation to Help You Relax... (2020)
- The Longest Sidewalk in the World (2020)

=== Music videos ===
- Bop 25 w/ Micah Sherman (2012)
- Movie Star w/ Micah Sherman (2013)
- Comedian's National Anthem w/ Micah Sherman (2013)
- Music's Fun (To Play) (2016)
- Sung Advice #1-8 (2017)

=== Video podcasts ===
- Risk!: NYC PodFest (2013)
- Robert Kelly's You Know What Dude: #162 (2017)
- Never Not Funny: Talking Eyebrows (2020)
- Quip League: with Moshe Kasher (2020)
- Linda Marcus Smith's The Comics' Spot: with Comedian Michael Adam Kaplan (2020)
- Ghole: Hanging with Myq A.K.A. Myq Kaplan (2020)
- The Comedy Studio: Podcast LIVE Sept. 22 (2020)
- Face to Facetime: #22 (2020)
- The Dave Hill Goodtime Hour: October 5 (2020)
- The Ted Alexandro Show: Ep. 27 (2020)
- Scot Nery: Is it a mistake to specialize? (2020)
- The Rhett Sever Podcast: #2 Existentialism (2021)
