= Ruckus (game show) =

American variety/game show

- Genre: Game show
- Created by: Merv Griffin
- Written by: Marc Hershon
- Directed by: James Marcione
- Presented by: The Amazing Johnathan
- Narrated by: Jim Bradley
- Theme music composer: Mort Lindsey
- Country of origin: United States
- No. of episodes: 60

Production
- Executive producer: Merv Griffin
- Producer: Burt Wheeler
- Production locations: Merv Griffin Resorts, Atlantic City, New Jersey
- Camera setup: Multi-camera
- Running time: approx. 26 minutes
- Production companies: Merv Griffin Enterprises; Columbia Pictures Television

Original release
- Network: WNBC-TV
- Release: September 9, 1991 – January 3, 1992

Ruckus is an American variety/game show that starred The Amazing Johnathan for a season and was shot at Merv Griffin's Resorts in Atlantic City, New Jersey. Assistants on the program were Helen Incollingo and Charlene Donahue-Wallace. The format had audience members playing games for cash prizes. In the final round, three contestants played a four-minute stunt round.

The show often begin with Johnathan performing a magic trick, and the camera often zoomed in on the loud audiences cheering wildly for the contestants.

== Stunts ==
The stunts were all similar to Beat the Clock stunts, but they were all designed to be messy. Sometimes Johnathan would perform another magic trick prior to the stunt. Many stunts often awarded around $500 to be split amongst the teams, and some stunts allowed for bonus money.

== Reach For the Stars ==
The final round, titled "Reach For the Stars", involved 3 players trying to win as much money as possible. (Reach for the Stars was also the title of a 1967 game show created by Merv Griffin which featured similar game play). The four-minute timer began counting down as soon as Johnathan began reading the first question. The player who buzzed in and answered it earned $100 and ran over to a board with stars. He/she would grab a star and hand it to Johnathan to answer a question or perform a stunt, all of which were worth anywhere from $100 to $1,000. If they failed to answer a question or perform a stunt before hearing the buzzer, the other two contestants were eligible to answer a toss-up question to get in the game. Some episodes used a variation where another toss-up question would be asked after each stunt regardless of whether the contestant who played it completed it or not. The player with the biggest total won the game and the cash they earned with it when the four minutes expired.

== Broadcast history ==
The show aired from September 9, 1991, to January 3, 1992, on WNBC-TV in New York City, with plans to move it to syndication. However, it did not resurface until the Game Show Network began airing reruns in 1997. According to the Amazing Johnathan's website, he was embroiled in a contract dispute with joint creator-executive producer Merv Griffin during the off-season and chose not to return; not wanting to continue the show with a different host, Griffin opted to cancel it instead.

== Reception ==
Ruckus has been called a " a Beat the Clock-type game show."
