= Rob Lake =

American magician and illusionist (born 1982)

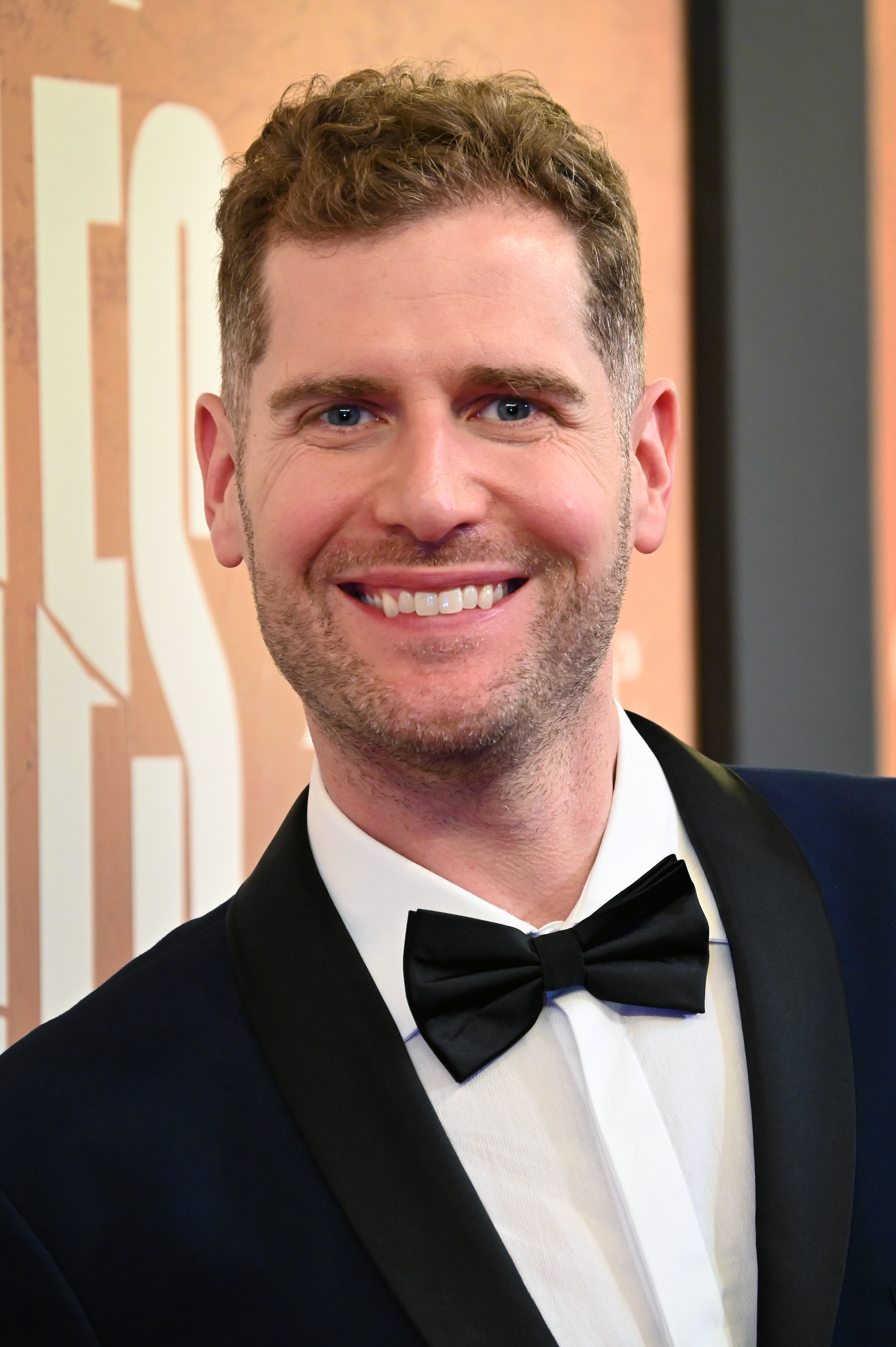
- Lake in 2025
- Born: 30 December 1982 (age 43); Norman, Oklahoma
- Occupations: Magician; illusionist; illusion designer; magic consultant; theatrical producer
- Agent: WME
- Known for: America's Got Talent; Starring in the Broadway production Rob Lake Magic with Special Guests The Muppets; Residencies at Atlantis Paradise Island
- Awards: Merlin Award for International Stage Magician of the Year (2008)
- Website: www.roblake.com

Rob Lake (born December 30, 1982) is an American magician and illusionist. He was a quarter-finalist on America's Got Talent in 2018, and in 2008 became the youngest recipient of the Merlin Award for International Stage Magician of the Year. He has performed in more than 60 countries, starred in the Broadway production Rob Lake Magic with Special Guests The Muppets, and worked as an illusion designer and consultant for stage and concert productions.

== Career ==
=== Early career ===
Rob Lake was born on December 30, 1982 in Norman, Oklahoma. Lake became interested in magic at age 10 when he saw the Kirby VanBurch show in Branson, Missouri. VanBurch soon became Rob's mentor along with another Oklahoma magician, Jim Smithson. After seeing VanBurch perform, Lake checked out every book on magic in his local public library and began staging performances for family and neighbors. By age 11 he was performing at birthday parties, Rotary and Lions club meetings, and churches, reinvesting his earnings in new props. He attended Oklahoma Children's Theater summer programs as a child and has cited Walt Disney, Jim Henson and Steven Spielberg as lifelong influences, along with an early interest in the engineering and production behind theme park attractions and filmmaking. He left the University of Oklahoma at age 20 to pursue magic full time, taking birthday party and restaurant work while staying with family and friends and reinvesting his earnings in the show. He later moved to Branson, where he worked alongside VanBurch, before taking a six-month engagement at a Japanese theme park performing five shows a day.

In 2005 at age 22, Rob embarked on his first international tour, performing in Japan for several months. Back in the US, Rob started performing his theatrical show for casinos and cruise ships, including Disney Cruise Line and Holland America Line. In 2008 Rob became the youngest magician ever to receive a Merlin Award as the International Stage Magician of the Year. Rob Lake performed several of his illusions for the international program, Great Magicians of the World that aired internationally in 2008 & 2009.

In 2012, Lake performed a summer residency at Harrah's New Orleans.

In 2013 Rob performed 8 illusions for Masters of Illusion (TV series) airing in 2014. Rob Lake was featured on Elizabeth Stanton's Great Big World syndicated television series in 2013 and 2014.

In March 2013, Lake made a 50,000-pound armored truck appear outside FedExForum in Memphis for a Caesars Entertainment promotional event.

In 2014, Lake held a summer residency at the Trump Taj Mahal in Atlantic City, New Jersey. He later held recurring engagements at Harrah's Lake Tahoe, including a holiday run from December 2016 to January 2017 and a summer 2017 return.

=== America's Got Talent ===
In 2018, Lake competed on season 13 of America's Got Talent, advancing to the third live quarter-final at the Dolby Theatre. His audition featured an appearance illusion in which he was shown outside the theater before appearing inside a curtain held onstage by Heidi Klum and Tyra Banks. The vanishing effect he performed in the audition took him seven years to develop. Videos of his appearances subsequently accumulated more than 80 million views on YouTube and Facebook.

=== International engagements ===
Lake has performed his show touring to theatres, arenas, and casinos throughout the United States, including the Las Vegas Strip.

Beginning in 2015, Lake completed seven separate engagements at Atlantis Paradise Island, including a multi-year residency through 2018 and return summer residencies in 2023 and 2025.

His other notable international engagements during this period included a month-long engagement in Singapore in 2018 and an engagement in Riyadh in 2019. In 2022, he headlined a sold-out engagement at Dubai Opera and in Kuwait City. He toured South Africa in 2024, with residencies in Cape Town and Johannesburg. In 2025, he returned to Dubai for an engagement at the Dubai World Trade Centre before making his Indian debut in Mumbai.

By 2026, Lake had performed in casinos, arenas, and theaters in more than 60 countries.In 2017, BroadwayWorld reported that his show had generated millions of dollars at the box office.

=== Later television appearances ===
Lake appeared on the Hallmark Channel series Home & Family in 2017. In 2019, he involved Michael Strahan and Sara Haines in an illusion on ABC's Good Morning America and was featured with CeeDee Lamb in a segment for ESPN's College GameDay.. In 2021, Lake appeared on Fox's Game of Talents and performed a levitation with Justin Sylvester on E!'s Daily Pop. He also appeared on TBS's Go-Big Show. That year, he also appeared on the Italian talent series Tú sí que vales, advancing to the final.

In 2025, he appeared on Today and Watch What Happens Live with Andy Cohen.

=== Illusion design and consulting ===
Lake has worked as an illusion designer and magic consultant for stage and concert productions. His credits include the North American tour of Disney's Aladdin and the Broadway musical Death Becomes Her. His other design and consulting credits include the Harry Potter global philharmonic concert tours, Sesame Street Live and projects for Walt Disney Imagineering.

Lake served as creative consultant and illusion designer for Adele's Weekends with Adele residency at Caesars Palace in Las Vegas. His work included the disappearance effect used at the end of the production.

In February 2026, Variety reported that he had signed with WME.

== Broadway ==
In August 2025, Lake and Kermit the Frog announced Rob Lake Magic with Special Guests The Muppets, a limited Broadway engagement at the Broadhurst Theatre. Lake created, produced and starred in the production, which marked the Broadway debut of The Muppets. Kermit, Miss Piggy, Fozzie Bear, Animal, Rowlf and Gonzo appeared in the production, and Lake developed new illusions for their participation. In discussing the production, Lake cited the Muppets as a childhood influence and pointed to Broadway's vaudeville history and magicians including Harry Houdini, Howard Thurston and Harry Kellar as influences on his work.

The production began previews on October 28 and opened on November 14 at the Broadhurst Theatre. After 20 previews and four regular performances, the production closed on November 16.

In October 2025, shortly before previews began, Lake appeared on Playbill's Big Broadway Nerd Panel at New York Comic Con.

== Philanthropy ==
=== Animal rescue ===
Lake has performed benefit shows in Oklahoma supporting animal rescue and welfare since 2013, beginning with a fundraiser for animals affected by the 2013 Moore tornado. He has since staged annual benefits for organizations including Friends for Folks and Norman Animal Welfare, and has also benefited the Central Oklahoma Humane Society.

Friends for Folks pairs shelter dogs considered unadoptable with inmates trained as handlers. Lake's own rescue dog has appeared in the performances, and sponsors have underwritten tickets for low-income families and children in the community to attend.

Benefit performances in subsequent years, included engagements in Oklahoma City in 2021, 2022, and 2023, and in Norman in 2024 and 2025.

=== Operation Magic ===
Lake has performed recurring international tours for Armed Forces Entertainment, presenting shows for United States service members and their families at military installations in Europe and the Pacific.

Beginning during the COVID-19 pandemic, Lake executive produced three streaming specials for Armed Forces Entertainment. The first, released in 2021, was directed by Ed Gregory, with Michael Arden serving as theatrical consultant. It featured appearances by Rodney Atkins, Nancy Cartwright, Lauren Cohan, Reba McEntire, Rex Linn, Thomas Schumacher and Gina Torres. The third special, released in 2023, combined stage illusions, street magic and behind-the-scenes footage and featured Darci Lynne.
