= The Amazing Johnathan =

American comedian and magician (1958–2022)

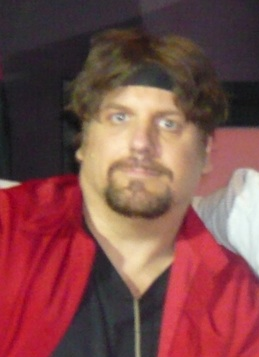
- Johnathan in 2008
- Born: John Edward Szeles; September 9, 1958; Detroit, Michigan, U.S.
- Died: February 22, 2022 (aged 63); Las Vegas, Nevada, U.S.
- Occupations: Magician, comedian, actor
- Years active: 1983–2014; 2017–2022
- Spouses: Sandra Bowing (m. 1995; div. 2000) Anastasia Synn (m. 2014)
- Website: theamazingjohnathan.com

John Edward Szeles (September 9, 1958 – February 22, 2022), better known by the stage name The Amazing Johnathan, was an American comedian and magician. His act was mostly composed of hijinks, interaction with one specific audience member, and a few legitimate magic tricks. From 2001 to 2014, he was a year-round headliner in Las Vegas. Self-described as the "Freddy Krueger of Comedy", Szeles performed wearing his ever-present headband, and his shows frequently used gore; for example, pretending to suck on his own hanging eyeball, cutting his wrists, and skewering his own tongue. He was also good friends with fellow performer Criss Angel and helped him perform a variety of illusions, most notably during three guest appearances on Angel's Mindfreak.

== Career ==
=== Early career ===
Szeles was born in Detroit, Michigan, the son of Doreen and Edward Szeles. In the 1970s, he relocated to California, where he began his career performing on the streets of San Francisco. He first appeared on television in The 8th Annual Young Comedians Show in 1983 and later went on to become the host of the short-lived 1991 syndicated variety/game show Ruckus. He appeared on various talk and variety shows from the mid-1980s to mid-2000s. His only credited performance as an actor was "The Obligatory Holiday Episode" of The Weird Al Show (playing the part of Uncle Johnathan). He made several appearances on Late Night with David Letterman, a record 24 appearances on Fox's Comic Strip Live, and had several specials on Comedy Central including Comedy Central Presents, Lounge Lizards, and more recently his own one-hour special entitled Wrong on Every Level. He dedicated the special to his Uncle Eugene, who showed him his first card trick which "started this whole mess". He appeared in the 2005 documentary The Aristocrats.

Johnathan had success in Australia following appearances on Channel 9's Hey Hey It's Saturday.

Szeles also authored a how-to book on practical jokes titled Every Trick in the Book, a compilation of both classic practical jokes and plain magic tricks, along with his own original material in both categories. From 2014 onwards, he was working on his memoirs with the working title of Drive It Like You Stole It, although his declining health prevented him from finishing it.

=== Later years ===
In 2008, Szeles combined two of his passions, classic-car collecting and drive-in movie theaters, to open the "Amazing Underground", a members-only indoor drive-in located within his warehouse facilities in Las Vegas.

In 2011, Szeles was performing regular shows in Las Vegas at the Harmon Theater while also taking select dates at venues across the United States and in Australia. 2011 marked Szeles' third year of performing at the Harmon Theatre and Szeles' 11th consecutive year as a full-time Las Vegas headliner. He won the "Best Comedian" award from the Las Vegas Review-Journal (LVRJ), Comedian of the Year from Nevada Magazine, Top Ten Acts in Vegas (LVRJ), and was the longest-running, most successful solo comic magician in U.S. history.

In 2013, Szeles hosted an online talk show called Burn Unit.

== Personal life ==
In March 2007, it was reported that Szeles was diagnosed with "a serious heart condition". The performer's website identified the condition as cardiomyopathy and went on to assert that, due to a combination of weight loss and blood thinners, he was doing well.

In December 2012, Szeles ended his one-year contract with Bally's and ceased performing in Las Vegas. He had been performing in the city for 13 years. Szeles toured throughout 2013, playing The Improv comedy clubs. On June 7, 2014, he married his partner and manager Anastasia Synn. He had a stepdaughter, Haley Kenyon, from Synn's previous relationship.

However, his heart condition worsened, and Szeles announced that he would effectively retire, performing a final show in Toledo, Ohio, for the general public, and then for members of the Magic Castle on June 30 and July 1, 2014. On November 5, 2014, in front of a live audience on ENT Speaks, he stated that he had a year to live. However, Szeles defied his initial terminal prognosis. In 2017, he played several shows across the United States, with Synn assisting him and taking over when he became fatigued.

A documentary titled The Amazing Johnathan Documentary about his illness and return to the stage was released on Hulu in 2019.

A second documentary, Always Amazing: The True Story of the Life, Death, and Return of Amazing Johnathan, was also released in 2019, on YouTube.

Szeles died in his sleep of heart failure at his home in Las Vegas on February 22, 2022, at the age of 63.
