= WCMX (sport) =

Sport of performing athletic tricks in a wheelchair

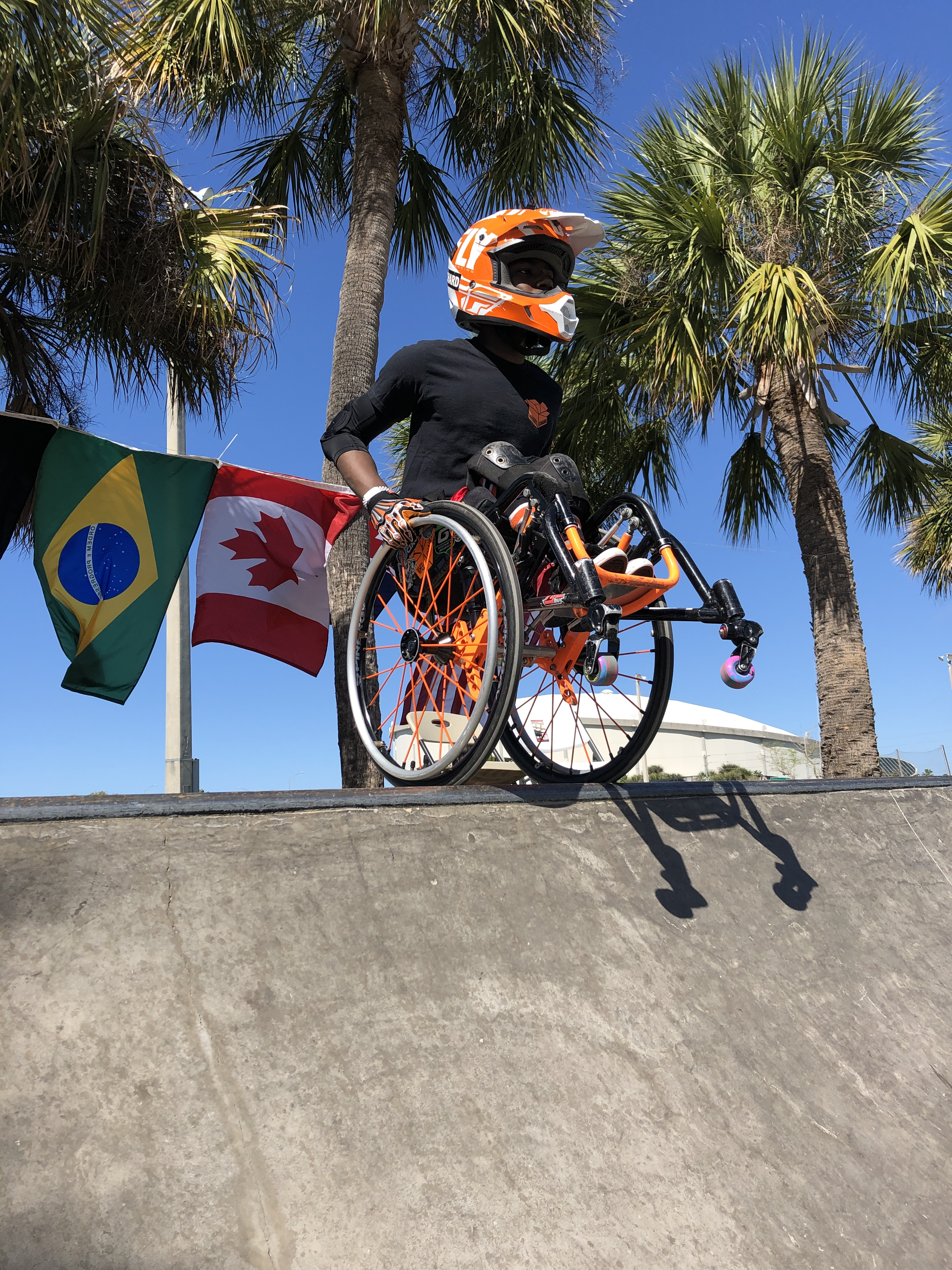
Wheelchair skater Delmace Mayo on top of a skate ramp

WCMX is a sport in which wheelchair athletes perform tricks adapted from skateboarding and BMX, usually performed at a skatepark. It was invented by Aaron Fotheringham.

== Overview ==
The sport has its own competitions and custom wheelchairs.

== History ==
The term WCMX, a mash-up of wheelchair and BMX, was coined by Fotheringham.

=== Australia ===
Timothy Lachlan was the first Australian to land a wheelchair backflip.

=== Germany ===
David Lebuser, Germany's first professional WCMX rider, popularized WCMX in Germany by hosting WCMX workshops and organizing world championships. He was crowned as (unofficial) World Champion by winning the Best Overall Run at the Life Rolls On WCMX event in Venice Beach, California in 2014. He obtained 3rd prices in the WCMX World Series in 2015, 2016, 2017, 2018, 2022 and 2023. At the 2016 WCMX World Series in Dallas USA, Philipp Cierpka performed a backflip as the first European WCMX athlete.

=== Switzerland ===
WCMX athlete Lorraine Truong popularized and professionalized the WCMX scene in Switzerland. She won the WCMX World Series in 2022 and 2023 and was known for her aggressive racing style. In addition, she was World WCMX board member in which she structured and modernized worldwide WCMX competitions.

=== UK ===
The first WCMX meet-up in the UK was in early 2019.

Welch Lily Rice was the first female in Europe to land a backflip in 2017. She won the WCMX World Series championship in September 2019.

Tomas Woods, a British athlete, won the 2023, 2024 and 2025 WCMX World Series.

=== USA ===
WCMX was created in the US. by Aaron Fotheringham. Fotheringham won several world championships, and participated in Nitro Circus and America's Got Talent: Extreme. He earned Guiness World records for the first wheelchair backflip (2008), highest ramp jump by wheelchair (2010), longest duration balancing a side wheelie in a wheelchair (2010), first wheelchair front flip (2011), longest wheelchair ramp (2018), tallest quarter-pipe drop-in on a wheelchair (2018) and highest wheelchair hand plant (2018). Katherine Beattie was the first female to perform a wheelchair backflip.

== Equipment used ==
Riders use purpose-built wheelchairs called WCMX chairs to perform various tricks and stunts. Unlike standard daily use wheelchairs, WCMX chairs have a reinforced frame, grind bar, carbon fibre push wheels, skateboard or rollerblade wheels, suspension castors and a seatbelt. The most commonly used safety gear is full-face helmets, elbow and knee pads and gloves. Full-face helmets are preferred as they offer greater protection against falls from any angle. For more dangerous tricks involving flips or mega ramps, riders should wear a neck brace and a chest/back protector to reduce the risk of injury to the spine.

== Categories of tricks ==
This is not an exhaustive list; new tricks and variations are created each day.

=== Air ===
Backflip, Double Backflip, Front Flip, 180, 360, Flair.

=== Bowl and ramp tricks ===
Handplant, Carving, Drop-In, Acid Drop, Bank Drop, One Wheel Drop-in, Layback, Blunt Stall, Fakie.

=== Flat-ground ===
One wheel spin, Castor Spin, Layback, Duck Walk, Bunny Hop.

=== Grinds and slides ===
50-50 Grind, 5-0 Grind, Footplate/Nosegrind, Hand-rim slide.

=== Balance ===
Wheelie, One Wheel Wheelie, No-Handers.

=== Miscellaneous ===
Upside-Down Wheelie, Upside-Down One Wheel Spin.

== Risks ==
As with other skatepark sports, the risks involved in WCMX can be greatly reduced by wearing safety gear such as a full-face helmet and pads, and only trying tricks within the rider's skill level. WCMX chairs provide a wide base of support, making falls less likely unless the rider is trying tricks that involve shifting the centre of gravity, e.g. balance tricks such as one-wheel spins.

== Culture ==
In 2016, an online campaign for a Lego wheelchair skate park was rejected. However, WCMX is represented in the Lego City Skate Park (60290) set, released 2021.
