= Snake handler =

One who handles and works with snakes

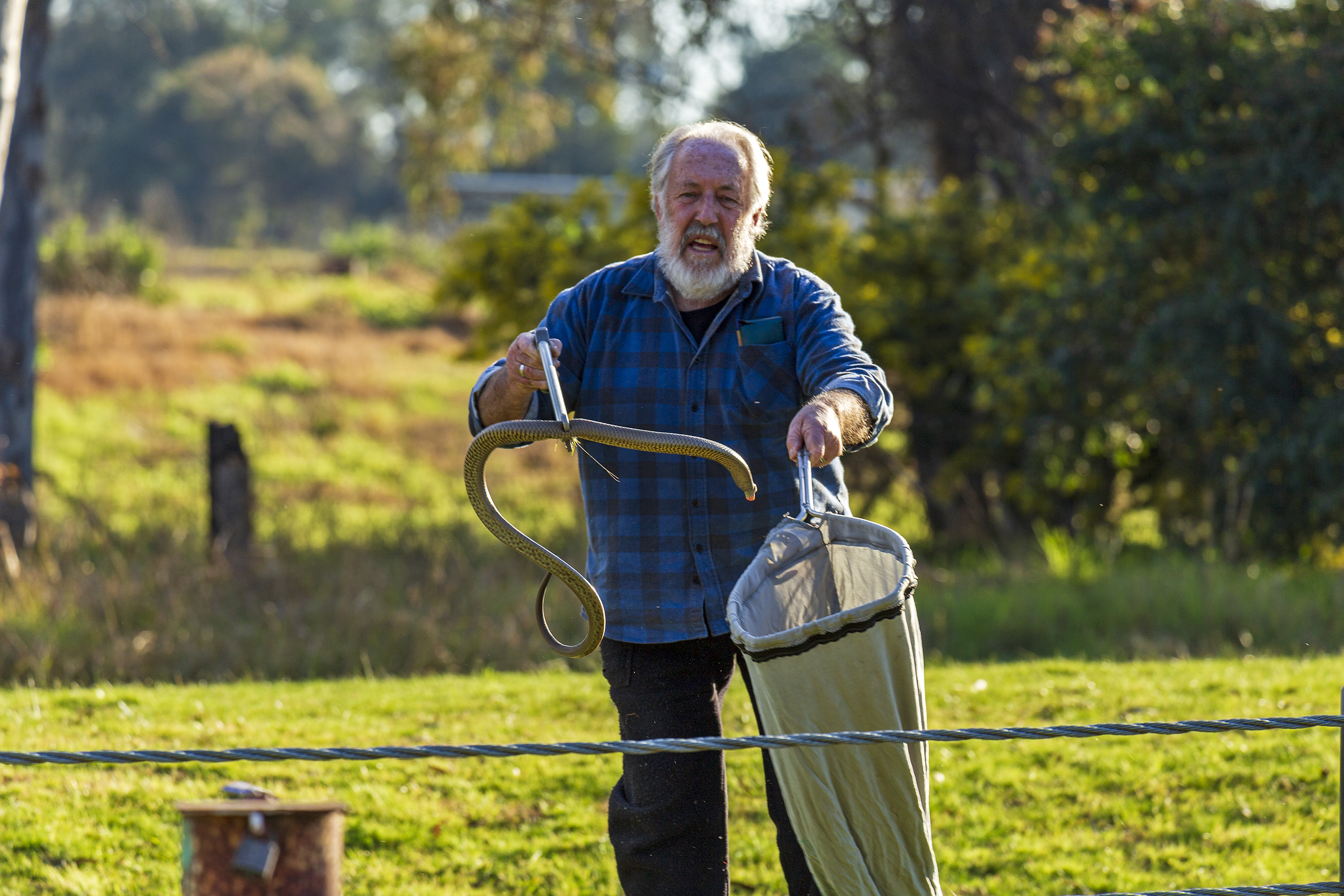
Snake handler catching an eastern brown snake in Wagga Wagga, New South Wales, Australia

A snake handler is a person who professionally handles and works with snakes. Snake handlers typically work in snake farms alongside herpetologists, and as zookeepers and in animal control services. Snake-handling skills are also employed by first responders, park rangers, and military personnel.
