= Professor Splash =

American show diver

- Born: Darren Taylor; March 8, 1961 (age 64); Denver, Colorado, United States
- Occupation: Master Shallow Water Diver

Professor Splash (born March 8, 1961) is the show name of Darren Taylor, an American show diver from Denver, Colorado. He is well known for breaking high diving records using small pools. He holds the Guinness World Records for highest shallow water dive. Taylor has been on The History Channel's Stan Lee's Superhumans and explained the form of his famous dive. Taylor appeared on Discovery Channel's Time Warp and set a world record dive captured on slow motion cameras.

In 2011, Professor Splash appeared on NBC's America's Got Talent as a part of the auditions that took place in Houston, Texas. He received a "yes" from all three judges and advanced to the Las Vegas round. From the Vegas round, he advanced directly to the live quarterfinals without having to perform. In the quarterfinals, he jumped 36 feet 7 inches into the water, setting a new Guinness world record. From that height he hit the water traveling at approximately 53 km/h (33 mph). He was chosen over Seth Grabel in Judge's Choice, advancing into the semifinals. He was eliminated in the semifinals and did not advance to the top 10. Professor Splash was the only performer in 10 seasons to set two Guinness records.

He appeared on ITV's Red Or Black? in the U.K. at Wembley Arena, Red Or Black? Kiev, Ukraine, Outrageous Acts of Science on Science Channel and "Minute of Fame" in Moscow, Russia.

He was also on Česko Slovensko má talent 2012 (another version of Got Talent).

Professor Splash would come out of retirement to participate in the second season of the Go-Big Show where he came second.
