= Roy Fransen =

British stunt performer (1916–1985)

Personal information
- Born: 4 January 1916 Tottenham, Great Britain
- Died: 5 July 1985 (aged 69) Northolt, Great Britain

Sport
- Sport: Diving

Royston Albert Fransen (born 4 January 1916 in Tottenham, north London, England; died 5 July 1985) was a British high diver and stuntman. He was best known for his public displays of high and acrobatic diving, usually into shallow depth tanks and pools. These high dives were often performed with both diver and water surface being set ablaze with burning petrol. Fransen's professional high and fire diving career lasted over 40 years until an accident during a 1985 performance led to his death.

== Career ==
=== Early diving ===
As a youth and during the 1930s, Fransen practiced dry and without water at home in suburban Pinner, to improve his athletic hobby and sporting skills. He dived from a springboard into safety-netting set up in his parents' back garden.

In the late 1940s together with his elder brothers and friends, including diver-stuntman George Baines and diver Vera Beaumont, Fransen created a high dive stunt and show, aiming to generate an income. Within two seasons had grown into a full-scale water show production called Aqua-Revue, where a troupe of 20 to 30 performed a mix of acrobatic water skills, beauty, comedy and danger at open air lidos and indoor swimming pools. Roy Fransen's Aqua Show, plus Aqua-Belles and Aqua-Zanies, toured many UK holiday resorts well into the mid-1950s.

=== Record dive ===
In 1946 Fransen made a record breaking high-dive from the roof of Earls Court Exhibition Centre, a height of 108 feet (33 m), landing in water at a depth of 8 feet (2.4 m). The dive incorporated a full somersault followed by a head-first entry into a 16-foot (4.9 m) diameter (above ground) diving tank.

The record remained unbroken worldwide for 49 years, and during his lifetime Fransen remained the unchallenged European high and fire diving champion.

=== The Dive of Death ===
By 1960 Fransen had developed a more compact arena show. This was billed as the "Dive of Death", and as a spectacle attracted large audiences. Circus and trade fairs throughout the capital cities of the world were regularly visited, and his act appeared on television across Europe. Fransen appeared in an advertising campaign for Timex, performing several "On Fire Into Fire" high dives whilst wearing their brand of wristwatch.

The "Dive of Death" featured Fransen diving into burning petrol floating on the water's surface. The act usually saved until after dark, allowing the flames to add greater drama. The "On Fire, Into Fire" dive was performed—on occasions thrice daily. Then Fransen would wear a full body costume: a silver painted cotton boiler-suit. Doused with petrol himself, a moment was selected to set alight both tank and diver, and he would dive 70 feet (21 m) into the water.

Although a regular swallow dive from a height of 75 feet (23 m) is twice the average of Olympic diving, the water in Fransen's dive was less than half as deep, and the surface area of the pool was much smaller. Every dive, even without fire, required precision alignment and split-second reactions. Head first (swallow dive) entry into the tank itself—a mere 16 feet (4.9 m) in diameter—demanded perfect aim and a secure launch from the diving platform above.

== Death ==
On 5 July 1985, at the age of 69, Fransen died from injuries when his "Five Dive" show at a public performance at Northolt Air Show went wrong.
