= Flying the Foam and Some Fancy Diving =

- Screenshot from the film
- Directed by: James Williamson
- Starring: 'Professor' Reddish
- Cinematography: James Williamson
- Production company: Williamson Kinematograph Company
- Release date: 1906
- Running time: 1 min 40 secs
- Country: United Kingdom
- Language: Silent

Flying the Foam and Some Fancy Diving is a 1906 British silent comic trick film, directed by James Williamson, featuring a man diving from Brighton Pier while mounted on a bicycle, in both forward and reverse motion.

This film, according to Michael Brooke of BFI Screenonline, "adds additional layers of entertainment, firstly by showing the stunt from multiple angles (or rather several stunts, as the surrounding crowds differ from shot to shot) and then by showing it in reverse motion so that Reddish appears to be performing the impossible feat of riding his bicycle vertically out of the sea". It is believed to be an extended version of Professor Reddish Performing his Celebrated Bicycle Dive from Brighton West Pier (1902), supplemented by more conventional footage of pier divers at a later date.
