= Anastasia Synn =

Canadian entertainer and activist (born 1975)

- Born: January 1, 1975 (age 51); Richmond Hill, Ontario, Canada
- Occupations: Stunt performer; Magician; Transhumanist; Biohacker; Cyborg rights activist
- Years active: 2006–present
- Spouse: The Amazing Johnathan (m. 2014; died 2022)
- Website: synnister.com

Anastasia Synn is a Canadian sideshow stunt performer and magician, as well as a transhumanist and biohacker. She is known for her cyborg rights activism. She was married to magician and comedian the Amazing Johnathan, whom she also managed, until his death on February 22, 2022.

== Transhumanism and biohacking ==
A frequent speaker at magic, transhumanist, and biohacking conferences, Synn's implants include the largest magnet ever implanted into a person, as well as a sound-transmitting magnet implanted into the tragus of her ear. In 2023, Guinness World Records named her the record holder for most technological implants in the body (female), at 52. All of her modifications were surgically performed by a nurse and an underground DIY surgeon.

Synn has used her implants to perform magic tricks, appearing on the television show Penn & Teller: Fool Us. This performance was named by BioHacking News as one of the top biohacking moments of 2018.

Synn's biohacking is part of the DIYbio cyborg subculture called "grinding", which developed out of the magnets being used in the body modification subculture instead being used as a hack to acquire an "electromagnetic sense". Around half of Synn's implants are microchips, which she programs to give herself heightened senses and abilities, such as opening locks, turning on her computer, and the like.

Synn has spoken before the Nevada State Senate to oppose a 2019 proposal for a microchip implant ban, and her testimony influenced state senator Melanie Scheible to oppose the ban.

== Personal life ==
Synn met magician the Amazing Johnathan while he was doing a six-year run at the Harmon Theater. The couple got married at A Special Memory Chapel in Las Vegas in June 2014, in a ceremony attended by fellow magicians David Copperfield, Penn & Teller, and Jeff McBride, as well as comedian Gallagher. Their wedding reception took place at Geisha House, Las Vegas. Together, they hosted annual parties covered by the Las Vegas press. Synn frequently performed shows with her husband, often taking over for him halfway through when he became fatigued.

Synn has a daughter from a previous relationship.

== Media appearances and performances ==
Synn has been featured widely in the media, including in a 2010 feature in Las Vegas Weekly and in articles about biohacking, including a 2018 Gizmodo science feature.

She has appeared in The Verge's 2012 web documentary on biohacking, entitled A Journey into Cyborg America, as well as Zoomin Next's "Life of Cyborgs Episode Six: The Cybernetic Magician".

A "widely regarded stage performer", Synn has performed "shocking" needle penetrations of her muscles and has appeared on national television in the United States during a 2018 episode of Masters of Illusion, with the Amazing Johnathan, as well as in a solo performance during a September 2018 episode of Penn and Teller's Fool Us. In Australia, she appeared on an episode of James Galea's Best Trick Ever on ABC2. She has been featured at numerous live performance venues, including Scot Nery's Boobie Trap and Brookledge Follies.

Synn was featured on the cover of the international magic magazine Vanish in September 2018.

She is featured in the 2019 film The Amazing Johnathan Documentary directed by Benjamin Berman.
