= Scot Nery's Boobie Trap =

Live performance variety arts show in Los Angeles, California

Scot Nery's Boobietrap is a weekly live performance variety arts show founded in 2015, featuring musicians, ventriloquists, comedians, knife throwers, dancers, Magic Castle magicians, jugglers, acrobats, contortionists, circus acts, and other variety entertainers. The show was created by Scot Nery and until 2020, co-produced by Meranda Carter. Performances are held every Wednesday, featuring an average of 15 acts each week. They are intended for audiences 17 years and older.

== History ==
Boobietrap launched in May 2015 as "Scot Nery's Platinum Open Mic" at Way 2 Much Entertainment's headquarters in an Echo Parkwarehouse. The show quickly transitioned to a curated and booked format. In December 2015, Fire Leopard became the house band.

The show moved to Fais Do Do in West Adams, Los Angeles in June 2016, then to The Whitley on Hollywood Boulevard in Hollywood in June 2017. The show ran continuously for 254 weeks from May 2015 until March 2020, when it closed during the COVID-19 pandemic. The show resumed performances at venues in the Los Angeles area.

== Format ==
Each performance features approximately 15 acts, with each act performing for four minutes. Acts which exceed the time limit trigger playful disruptions including bubble machines, flashing lights, and inflatable air dancers. The show is hosted by Nery and accompanied by Fire Leopard. On rare occasions throughout the over-200 live performances of the show, guest emcees have hosted, including comedian and actor Tom Arnold, magician Justin Willman, and sword-swallower Brett Loudermilk.

== Reception ==
Called "a comedic whirlwind" by the Los Angeles Times, Boobietrap was named the Best Variety Arts Show in Los Angeles by Los Angeles, a magazine; as well as Outstanding Variety Show by San Diego Fringe and has been named the No. 1 Hollywood show on Tripadvisor. Boobietrap has attracted notable audience members including Emma Thompson, Mark L. Walberg (the television host), and Steve-O.

== Host and notable performers ==
Scot Nery is a juggler, contortionist, and fire-eater, who hosts Boobietrap. Notable performers who have appeared in the show include:

- Ventriloquist Karl Herlinger
- The band Fire Leopard
- Trapeze performer Rick Andreoli
- Comedian Joel Axelrod
- Juggler Michael Rayner
- Singer Jesse Payo
- Balloon artist Dennis Forel
- Magician Nathan Coe Marsh
- Contortionist Bonnie Morgan
- Juggler and mime Lindsay Benner
- Performance artist April Hava Shenkman
- Magician Kayla Drescher
- Magician Carisa Hendrix
- Reggie Watts from The Late Late Show with James Corden
- Aerialist Sagiv Ben Binyamin
- Comedian Kristen Studard
- Actress and comedian Kate Flannery
- Musician Popstar Nima
