= Aaron Fotheringham =

American extreme wheelchair athlete and WCMX pioneer

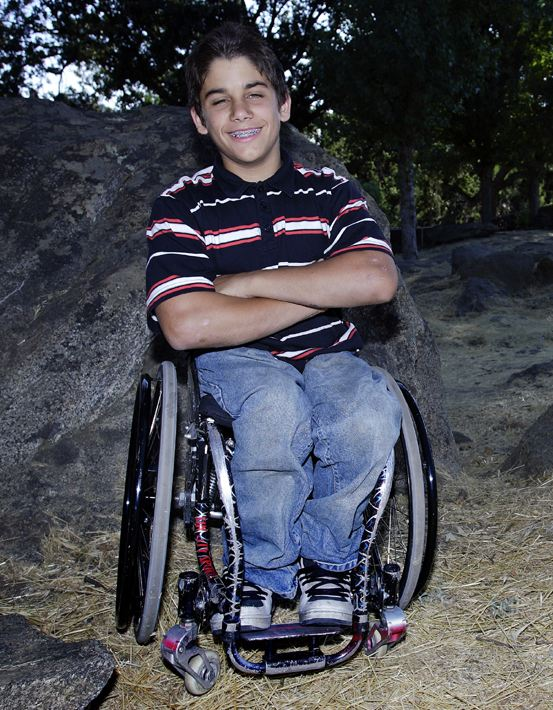
- Fotheringham in 2006

Personal information
- Full name: Aaron Fotheringham
- Nickname: Wheelz
- Born: November 8, 1991 (age 35) Las Vegas, Nevada, U.S.
- Height: 4 ft 10 in (147 cm)
- Spouse: Charlee Wilson (m. 2018)
- Website: https://aaronwheelz.com/

Sport
- Country: United States
- Sport: WCMX
- Club: Nitro Circus

Achievements and titles
- National finals: 2005 Vegas AmJam BMX

Aaron Fotheringham (born November 8, 1991) is an American extreme wheelchair athlete who performs tricks adapted from skateboarding and BMX. He competes in the Vegas Am Jam series in skate park competitions, usually against BMX riders.

Fotheringham calls his activity "WCMX". He is the first person to successfully perform a backflip in a wheelchair at the age of 14, and a double backflip at the age of 18. He performs many other tricks in his wheelchair including 180 degree 'aerials', one-wheeled spins and rail grinds. He plans to fuse the back flip with the 180 aerial into what is known as a 'flair'.

== Career ==
Although he used crutches early on, he has been a wheelchair user full-time since the age of eight. He would watch his brother riding his BMX at the skate park, and one day his brother told him that he should try riding his chair in the park, an event of which Fotheringham said "One day my brother was like, 'It'd be really cool if you dropped in on your chair, do you want to try it?'" My dad was there and he gave me the thumbs up, so they helped me get my chair up a four-foot quarter pipe. Then I dropped in and just fell. Multiple times. Then, finally, I rode away from one of them.". He later noted that "I did, and I was hooked". He placed fourth in the intermediate BMX division in a competition held at Sunny Springs Skate Park on August 26, 2006.

Fotheringham uses a customized WCMX wheelchair designed by Box Wheelchairs, which is both lightweight and features four-wheel suspension. This enables him to perform the same sorts of tricks that skateboarders and BMXers can do, as the suspension cushions his landings. Fotheringham has described it as "pretty much indestructible". Fotheringham advises others attempting to try these tricks to wear a helmet; he has had several injuries performing these tricks, including a broken elbow. He tries out new tricks by performing them first into a foam pit. Then he graduates to a 'resi', a harder plastic sheet over the cushions, before attempting the new trick on a regular skateboard ramp. When asked about having to practice, Fotheringham responded "I don't think of it as practice, I think of it as a fun way to live my life".

In 2010 Fotheringham joined the Nitro Circus Live tour, an action sports roadshow that tours Australia, New Zealand, Europe and the United States. "A little while after my 18th birthday I got an email from a producer of Nitro Circus. He said they'd heard I was trying to jump a big ramp but that nobody would give me permission. And they said: 'Here at Nitro Circus, we're not going to stop you doing it," Fotheringham later told James Renhard for Mpora. On the tour Fotheringham performed on a fifty-foot ramp-to-ramp jump doing backflips, double backflip attempts and on February 9, 2011, in New Zealand, the world's first wheelchair frontflip.

== In media ==
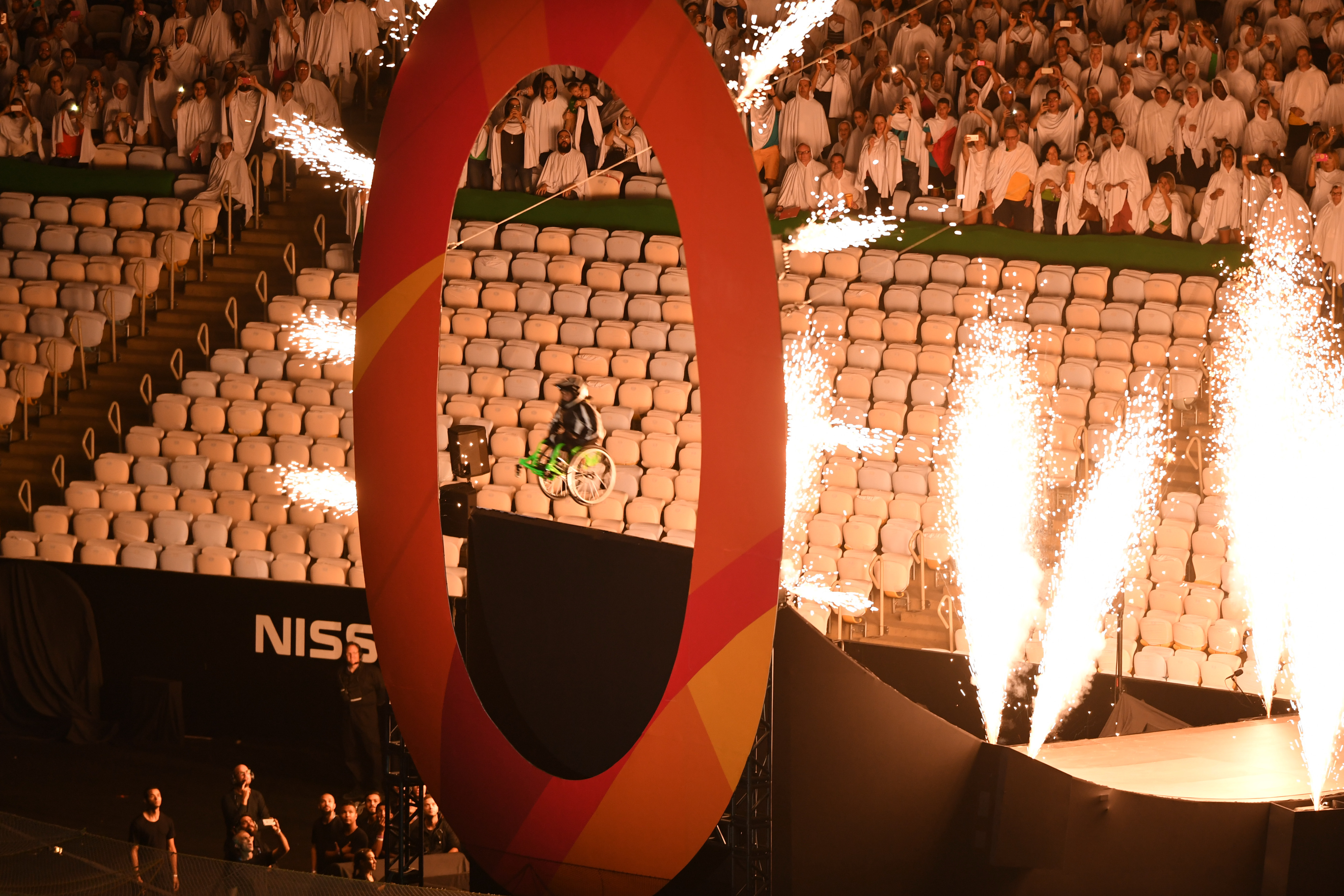
Fotheringham performing at the 2016 Summer Paralympics opening ceremony

In 2008 he appeared in an episode of the reality series The Secret Millionaire and received a donation of US$20,000 from Century Software founder Gregory Haerr. In 2009, Fotheringham worked as a stunt double for Kevin McHale's character, Artie Abrams, in the TV series Glee.

In 2022, he competed on America's Got Talent: Extreme. After receiving Nikki Bella's golden buzzer in the audition round, he advanced to the finale, and earned second place.

== Personal life ==
Fotheringham was born with spina bifida and has had 23 surgeries related to the condition throughout his life. He is one of six children who were adopted by his parents. Fotheringham is a member of The Church of Jesus Christ of Latter-day Saints and married Charlee Wilson in the Las Vegas Nevada Temple in 2018.
