= Red Bull Arena =

Red Bull Arena may refer to:

- Red Bull Arena (Leipzig), home stadium of German football club RB Leipzig
- Red Bull Arena (Salzburg), home stadium of Austrian football club FC Red Bull Salzburg
- Red Bull Arena (New Jersey), now known as Sports Illustrated Stadium, home stadium of American soccer club New York Red Bulls

== See also ==
- Red Bull, the naming-rights sponsor of these venues
- Association football teams owned by Red Bull
