= Hangar-7 =

Building in Salzburg, Austria

Coordinates: 47°47′37″N 13°00′26″E

- Logo of Hangar-7

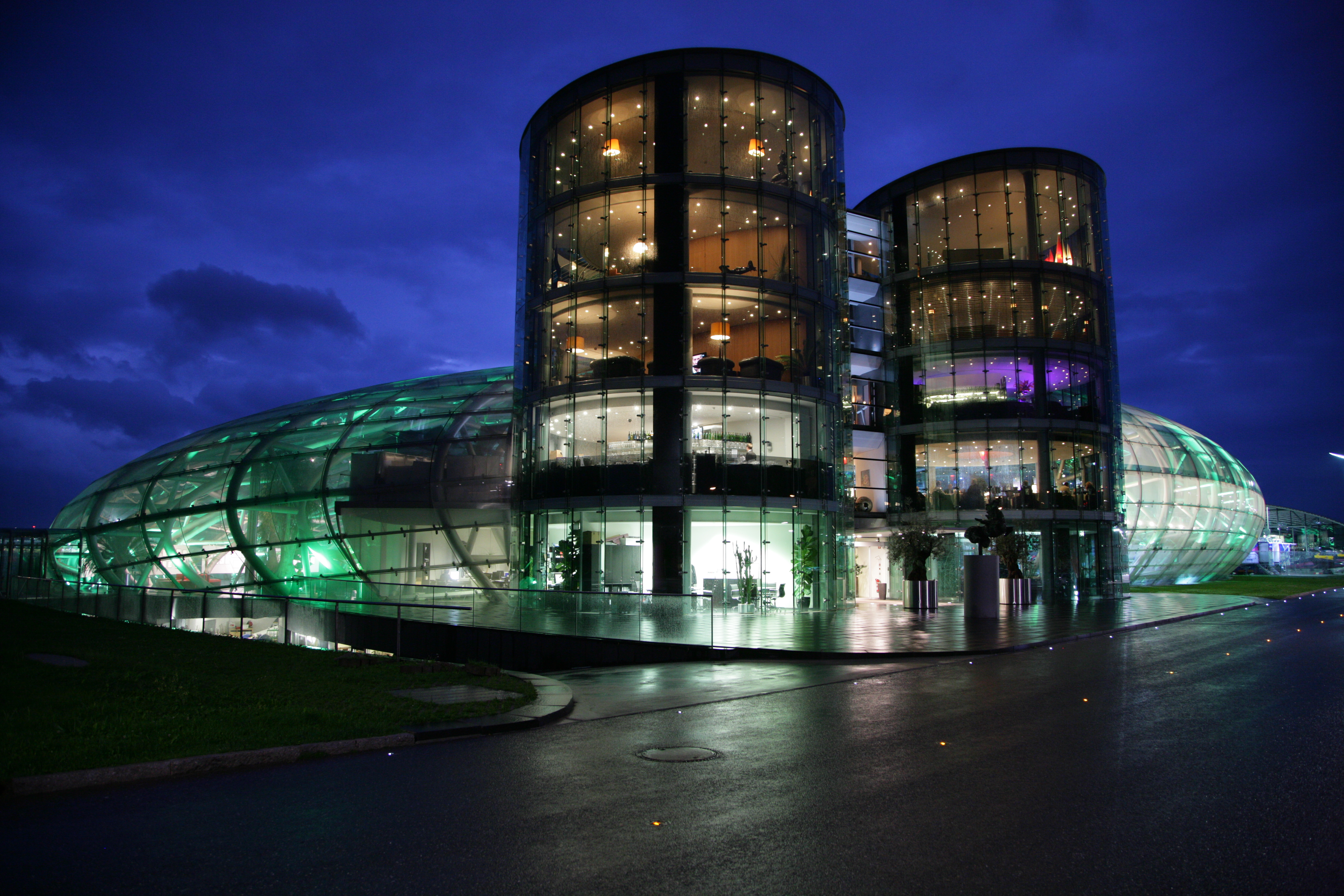
- Exterior of Hangar-7 at night
- Alternative names: Red Bull Hangar 7

General information
- Location: Salzburg, Austria
- Year built: 1999
- Completed: 2003
- Owner: Red Bull GmbH

Website
- www.hangar-7.com

Hangar-7 is an events venue, gallery and museum space adjacent to Salzburg Airport in Austria. It was built by Red Bull GmbH to bring together arts, aviation and the culinary arts. The building hosts the Michelin-starred restaurant Ikarus, two bars and a lounge alongside a collection of historical airplanes, helicopters, Formula One racing cars, and more in rotating exhibitions.

Hangar-7 was initially developed by Red Bull founder Dietrich Mateschitz who was looking for more space for The Flying Bulls, a private aircraft collection and performance aviation fleet associated with Red Bull. The Flying Bulls continues to be based at Hangar-7, and regular mainteneance on the collection takes place at "Hangar 8".

Hangar-7 hosts regular Red Bull affiliated events, including "Paper Wings", an event for folded paper airplanes, and films the live weekly talk show, "Sport und Talk aus dem Hangar-7" for ServusTV at the venue.

== Construction ==
Hangar 7 was designed by Volkmar Burgstaller. The building is airfoil shaped, constructed of 1,200 tons of steel and 75,000 sqft of glass surface. The steel-and-glass dome-shaped structure was engineered and built by Austrian specialists Waagner-Biro and completed in 2003.

The building was specifically designed to accommodate the fleet of The Flying Bulls. The building's 40m wide door was developed to allow them to fit their largest plane, a Douglas DC-6B, inside.
