= Red Bull Soapbox Race =

Soapbox race organized at least once a year by Red Bull

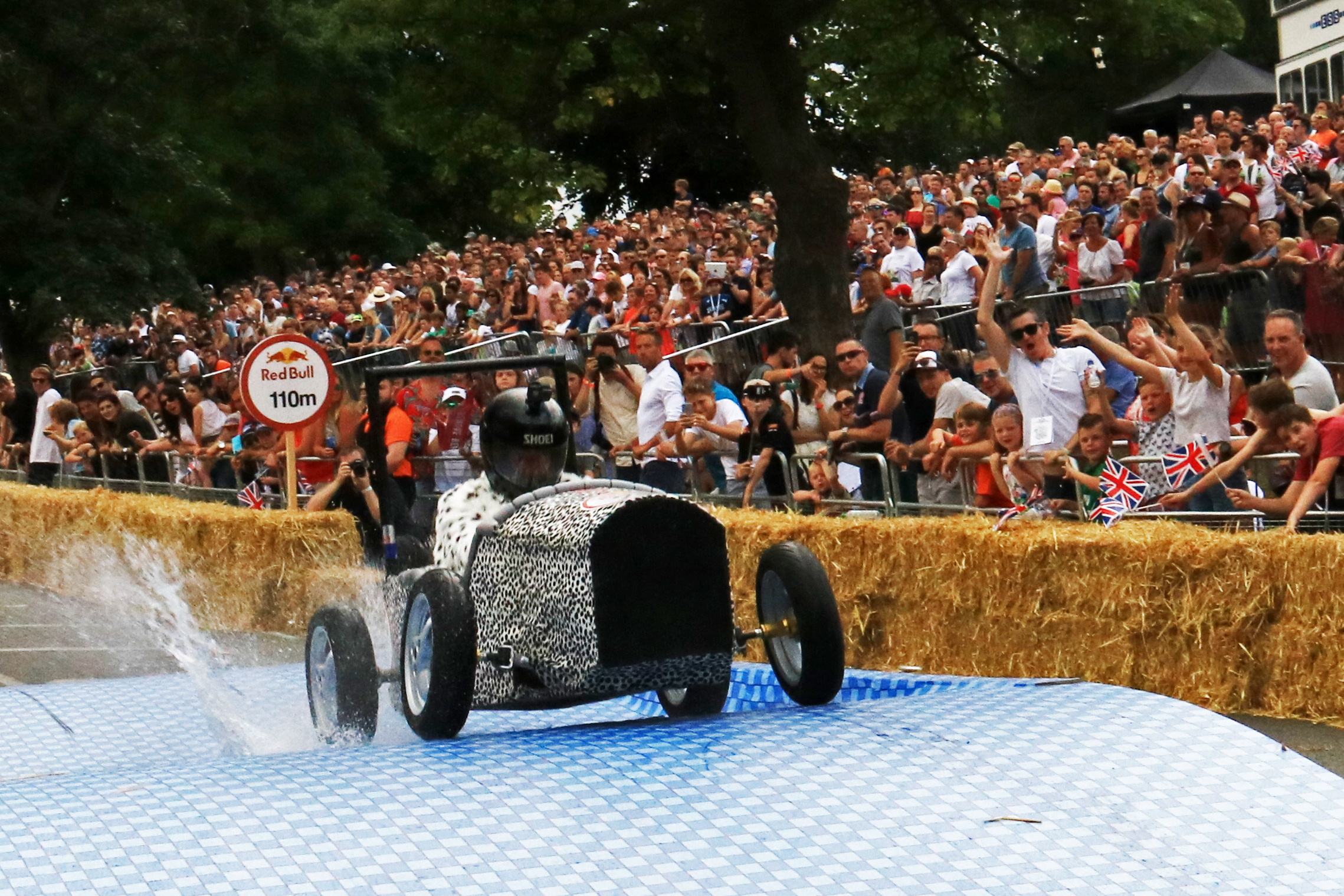
A participant driving through the course for the Red Bull Soapbox Race held in Alexandra Palace, London in 2017

The Red Bull Soapbox Race or Red Bull Box Cart Race is a soapbox race organised at least once a year by Red Bull. During its final phase, amateur pilots challenge one another by presenting hand-made, motor-less vehicles, judged for their aesthetics, their speed and their road-holding.

Originality and extravagance play an even greater role in the competition, as each team is also rated for their showmanship and the soapboxes are often inspired by folklore, pop culture, motorsport or everyday-life themes in their creation. Some notable examples include Pokémon-based karts and playful reproductions of the Popemobile or Mr. Bean's Mini.

First held in 2000, over a hundred races have been held in multiple countries around the world ever since, usually attracting thousands of spectators and putting the primary focus on the most creative and entertaining side of the competition.

== History ==
The inaugural event was held in Brussels, Belgium on April 30, 2000. Races have since been held all across the world, covering every single continent at least once, excluding Antarctica. The first race out of Europe took place on March 30, 2003, when the sixth edition was organized in Auckland, New Zealand: this was also the first time the competition was held in Oceania. Auckland would later host the soapbox race thrice more, in 2005, 2013 and 2015.

In 2004, the event was organized in four different locations throughout the year, including Durban, South Africa. The same location was chosen one year later, and the country would host the competition twice more, in 2006 (in Johannesburg) and 2010 (in Soweto): South Africa still represents the only African nation to have held the soapbox race.

The competition first arrived in the United States in 2006, when a new edition was held in St. Louis, Missouri: ever since, a total number of seventeen races have taken place throughout the country.

In 2007, the race spread to the Caribbean for the first time, as Jamaica hosted a new edition. Instead, South America first got to know the event better the following year, when two different editions were held in Brazil: the first one took place in Fortaleza on June 8, while the second one was organized in Porto Alegre on September 21.

The circle was completed between 2012 and 2017, with four subsequent editions being organized in the same number of Asian countries: China (although the event was hosted in Hong Kong), India, Taiwan and Oman.

Currently, 2017 has featured the largest amount of races, with eleven different races taking place between Europe, North America and Asia throughout the year.

2020 actually featured just one edition of the race, held in Santiago (the third time overall, as the Chilean capital city had already hosted the event in 2011 and 2016) on March 14. The second one was set to be held in Florence, Italy on June 7, but was later cancelled due to the emergency measures taken in response to the COVID-19 pandemic in the country. Still, the seventy selected projects were rated and awarded by the deputed jury in October of the same year.

== Rules ==
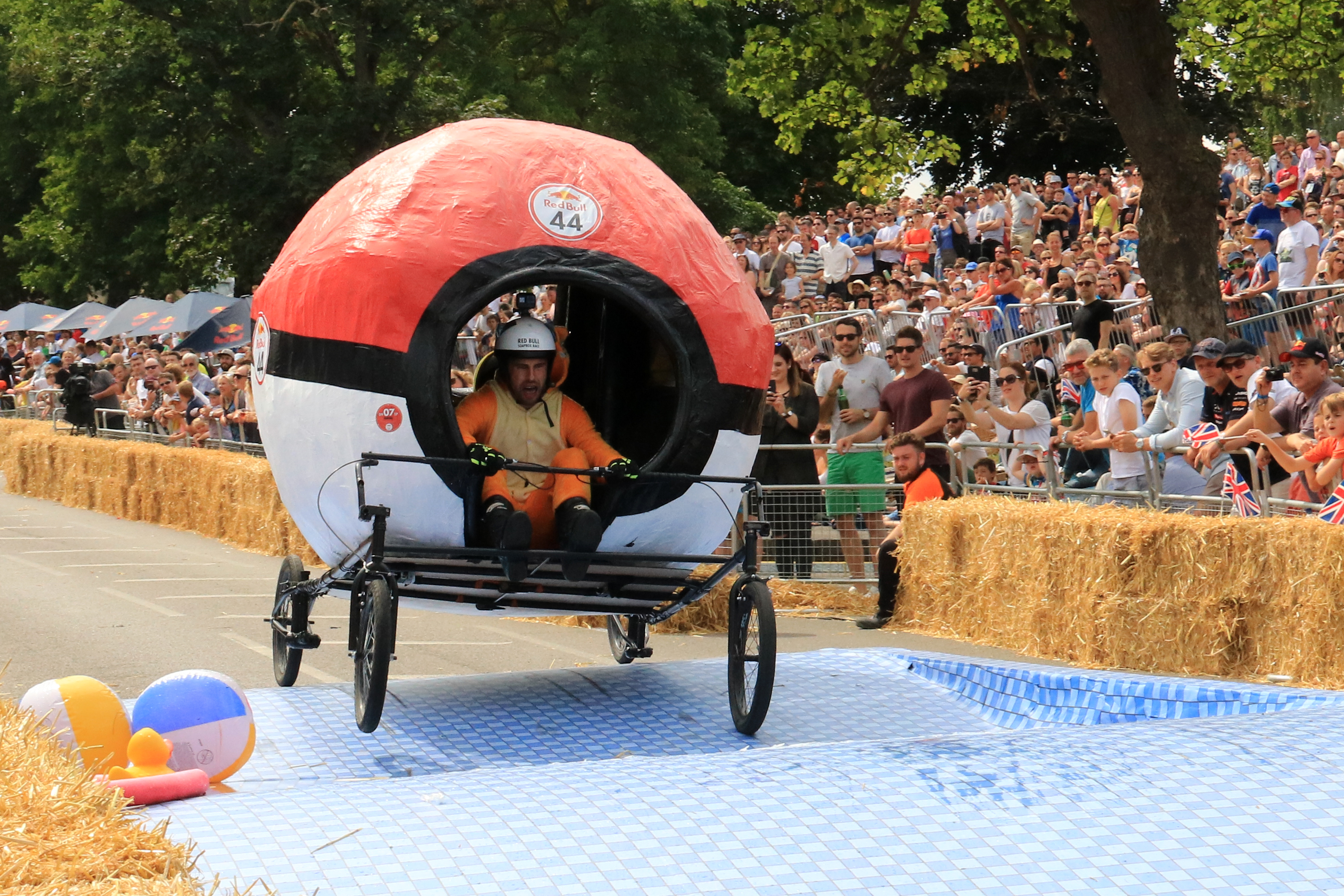
A participant to the race held in Alexandra Palace, London (2017) driving through the course on a Pokémon-inspired soapbox: creativity plays a huge role in the competition, as the style of each vehicle is inspired by folklore, pop culture or everyday-life themes.

The vehicles must have steering and braking capability. Teams are judged on both the time taken to complete the course, as well as creativity of their design and the showmanship of a performance at the start of the race, meaning the team with the fastest time is not necessarily the winner.

== Tracks ==
In the 2013 London race, one team reached a speed of over 50 kilometres per hour (30 mph) as they completed the 430-metre (1,410 ft) course in 33 seconds. The Cork 2004 course down St. Patrick's Hill was the steepest ever used at the time.

== Notable participants ==
In 2008, a team from Queen's University Belfast set the world speed record for soapbox racers at Stormont, Northern Ireland, at 72 km/h (45 mph), before entering the vehicle, Equmes 1, into the Red Bull race at Stormont later in the week.

On May 16, 2015, the Dutch racing driver Max Verstappen, a Formula One driver for the Red Bull racing team himself, opened the race in Valkenburg, Netherlands, driving a soapbox that resembled his own STR10 racing car.

On 7 July 2019, YouTubers Zac Alsop and Jamie Rawsthorne of "The Zac and Jay Show" entered the London race. In a Monopoly-themed run, they threw around £1,000 into the crowd.

In September 2024, YouTuber TomSka and a team from Surfshark VPN entered the race in Kaunas, Lithuania as part of an advertising campaign. The cart was themed around a toilet and had TomSka piloting the cart 'naked', though in reality he was wearing skin-coloured underwear, with the tagline "Why are you sharing your data, but not this?". TomSka also revealed that he had planned to film an episode for his series "TryHards" at the race alongside collaborator Eddie Bowley but that they had failed to secure places in time.

== Races ==
No.	Date	Course length	Location	City	Country/Region	Entrants	Winning team	Spectators	Reference
1	30 April 2000			Brussels	Belgium				
2	2 September 2001		Roundhay Park	Leeds	United Kingdom	50	The Garage		
3	2 September 2001	800 metres (2,600 ft)	Kurpark Oberlaa	Vienna	Austria				
4	17 March 2002			Melbourne	Australia				
5	7 July 2002	750 metres (2,460 ft)		Bern	Switzerland	62	Kuhl Runnings		
5	8 September 2002			Bochum	Germany				
6	30 March 2003	700 metres (2,300 ft)	Auckland Domain	Auckland	New Zealand	80	Rubber Duck Racing	44,000	
7	2004				Netherlands				
8	20 June 2004	250 metres (820 ft)	St Patrick's Hill	Cork	Ireland	63	Crazy Babies		
9	8 August 2004	650 metres (2,130 ft)	Knebworth Park	Stevenage	United Kingdom	84	Team Volvet Underground		
10	17 October 2004	445 metres (1,460 ft)	Trematon Drive	Durban	South Africa	67	Team Flower Power		
	28 November 2004	500+ metres (1,600+ ft)	Lansdowne Street	Melbourne	Australia	94	BBQ boys from Monbulk		
	2005		La Rue d'Ouchy	Lausanne	Switzerland				
	2005	445 metres (1,460 ft)	Trematon Drive	Durban	South Africa	70+			
	13 February 2005	700 metres (2,300 ft)	Auckland Domain	Auckland	New Zealand	80	Wanganui Motors Transformers		
	18 September 2005		Schloss Solitude	Stuttgart	Germany				
	27 August 2006		Jan Smuts Avenue	Johannesburg	South Africa	54			
	24 September 2006	800 metres (2,600 ft)	Kurpark Oberlaa	Vienna	Austria				
	29 October 2006		Forest Park	St. Louis, Missouri	United States	42	Fast Food		
	11 August 2007				Jamaica	43	The Pier One Team		
	30 September 2007	0.5 miles (800 m)	Fremont Avenue to North 36th Street	Seattle, Washington	United States		The A-Team		
	14 October 2007	0.25 miles (400 m)	College Hill	Providence, Rhode Island	United States	61	The Good, The Bad and The Nerdy (The Numerator 2.0)		
	11 May 2008			Brussels	Belgium				
	25 May 2008		Stormont	Belfast	United Kingdom	47	Ruddell Metals		
	8 June 2008		Praia do Futuro	Fortaleza, Ceará	Brazil	39	Elvis não morreu, bebeu! (Elvis did not die, drank!)		
	6 September 2008	500 metres (1,600 ft)		Philadelphia, Pennsylvania	United States		Deuces Wild		
	7 September 2008		West 4th Avenue	Vancouver, British Columbia	Canada				
	21 September 2008	400 metres (1,300 ft)	Corrida em Porto Alegre	Porto Alegre, Rio Grande do Sul	Brazil	29	Gangster's Team Gravity Race		
	4 October 2008		Eden Park	Cincinnati, Ohio	United States				
	25 October 2008			Denver, Colorado	United States		Team Save Ferris		
29	24 May 2009		Maçka	Istanbul	Turkey	60	FIRE(Ateş)		
	29 August 2009		10th Street, Piedmont Park	Atlanta, Georgia	United States		Yongsa Dragon Breath		
	6 September 2009			Medellín	Colombia				
	26 September 2009		Grand Ave. and 5th Street	Los Angeles, California	United States		Ironheade	105,000	
	18 October 2009		Sacher Park	Jerusalem	Israel				
	24 September 2010		Diepkloof Xtreme Park	Soweto	South Africa	50+	Team Zooma		
	6 November 2010		Fundidora Park	Monterrey	Mexico				
	23 April 2011		Estrada da Rainha	Balneário Camboriú, Santa Catarina	Brazil				
	23 May 2011			Los Angeles, California	United States	38	The Lakers Fanwagon	115,000	
	12 June 2011			Zagreb	Croatia				
	3 July 2011			Stockholm	Sweden				
	18 July 2011	450 metres (1,480 ft)	Heroiv Krut Alley	Kyiv	Ukraine	43			
	25 September 2011		Parque Nacional de Bogotá	Bogotá	Colombia	60			
	2 October 2011		Praça do Papa	Belo Horizonte, Minas Gerais	Brazil		Red Bule Uai Sô		
	21 November 2011			Santiago	Chile	68			
	5 May 2012	380 metres (1,250 ft)		Brussels	Belgium	85	Toga Max 2		
	10 June 2012		10th Street, Piedmont Park	Atlanta, Georgia	United States	36	SweetWater		
	1 July 2012	500 metres (1,600 ft)	Krylatskoye Cycling Circuit	Moscow	Russia	56			
	16 September 2012		Austin Ranch	Dallas, Texas	United States	40	Oregon Trail		
	23 September 2012			Warsaw	Poland	80			
	15 October 2012		To Shek Street, Ma On Shan	Hong Kong	China	42			
	2 December 2012			Mumbai	India	50			
	19 April 2013			Muscat	Oman		No Flying Yoke		
	14 July 2013	500 metres (1,600 ft)	Halde Hoheward	Herten	Germany	68	Zeitrider	55,000	
	14 July 2013	420 metres (1,380 ft)	Alexandra Palace	London	United Kingdom	70	SpitPhya		
	25 August 2013		Nygårdsparken	Bergen	Norway				
	29 September 2013		Taipei National University of the Arts	Taipei	Taiwan				
	11 November 2013			Buenos Aires	Argentina				
	13 November 2013	700 metres (2,300 ft)	Auckland Domain	Auckland	New Zealand		Team Zoom Car Wash		
	6 April 2014	400 metres (1,300 ft)	La Heradura	Lima	Peru	52	Rapidos Y Sabrosos	25,000	
	15 June 2014		Parc de Saint-Cloud	Paris	France	50	Rugbyman en Folie	38,000	
	24 August 2014		Yesler Way	Seattle, Washington	United States	36	Nickerson Street Saloon Rainier Rocket		
	14 September 2014		Amfiteatrul Mihai Eminescu	Bucharest	Romania	51	Vegetarian Cannibals		
	28 September 2014		National Palace of Culture	Sofia	Bulgaria				
	28 September 2014	500 metres (1,600 ft)	IFSC Headquarters	Turin	Italy	61	Let There Be Rock	40,000	
	16 May 2015	350 metres (1,150 ft)	Cauberg	Valkenburg	Netherlands	60	Der Mergelvreters		
	12 July 2015	420 metres (1,380 ft)	Alexandra Palace	London	United Kingdom	65	Absolute Radio Breakfast Club		
99	29 August 2015	1,500 feet (460 m)	Eden Park	Cincinnati, Ohio	United States	41	Peep My Ride		
100	4 September 2015			Amman	Jordan				
101	6 September 2015	300 metres (980 ft)	Beaver Hall Hill	Montreal, Quebec	Canada	45	The Docs (Back to the Future)	25,000	
102	20 September 2015	400 metres (1,300 ft)		Goiânia, Goiás	Brazil				
103	24 October 2015	1,200 feet (370 m)	North Ave, Old Fourth Ward	Atlanta, Georgia	United States		The Grease Monkeys		
	31 October 2015		Montjuïc	Barcelona	Spain	70	TMC Men in Blue		
	15 November 2015		Centennial Parklands	Sydney	Australia				
	22 November 2015	700 metres (2,300 ft)	Auckland Domain	Auckland	New Zealand		Red Stag Hunters		
	5 June 2016		St Patrick's Hill	Cork	Ireland	60+	Jumbo Breakfast Roll		
	3 September 2016		Colina Park	Cluj-Napoca	Romania	41			
	11 September 2016		Atizapán	Mexico City	Mexico		Chile en Papas de Calabaza		
	9 October 2016			Baku	Azerbaijan				
	13 November 2016		Buddh International Circuit	New Delhi	India				
	13 November 2016		Hiranandani Gardens in Powai	Mumbai	India	50	The Other Guys		
	27 November 2016		Calle Talinay, La Reina	Santiago	Chile		Calcetin Con Rombosman		
	9 July 2017	420 metres (1,380 ft)	Alexandra Palace	London	United Kingdom		Brooklands Special		
	19 August 2019		Tähtitorninvuori	Helsinki	Finland		Saippua Loota Kustoms		
	19 August 2017	350 metres (1,150 ft)	Cauberg	Valkenburg	Netherlands	70	Return of the Legend		
	20 August 2017		The Botanical Garden	Aarhus	Denmark				
	20 August 2017		Elysian Park	Los Angeles, California	United States	61	OJ & the White Bronco		
	10 September 2017	410 metres (1,350 ft)	Mont-de-l’Enclus	Kluisbergen	Belgium	70	Pattyn Packing Lines		
	10 September 2017		La Rue d'Ouchy	Lausanne	Switzerland	70	The Fly		
	24 September 2017		Palace of the Republic	Almaty	Kazakhstan				
	1 October 2017		National Taiwan Sport University, Taoyuan	Taipei	Taiwan				
	1 October 2017		Parc de Saint-Cloud	Paris	France	51	Drum Team		
	23 October 2017		Yomiuriland Amusement Park	Tokyo	Japan				
	24 June 2018	500 metres (1,600 ft)	Villa Borghese	Rome	Italy				
	8 September 2018	1,500 feet (460 m)	Eden Park	Cincinnati, Ohio	United States		The Sea Cowboys (aka the Swamp Monkeys)		
	9 September 2018		Parque Eduardo Sétimo	Lisbon	Portugal		The Mean Machine		
	7 July 2019	420 metres (1,380 ft)	Alexandra Palace	London	United Kingdom	59	Gas Gas Gas	20,000	
	15 September 2019			Kaunas	Lithuania	60	Klumpė		
	28 September 2019		The Colony Ranch	The Colony, Texas	United States		Skeeter Done, (aka the Swamp Monkeys)		
	6 October 2019		Yomiuriland	Kawasaki, Kanagawa	Japan		Banana Cabaret		
	14 March 2020		Zona de Pits, Parque Metropolitano	Santiago	Chile	30	Los Pícaros del Bío Bío		
	~~7 June 2020~~	500 metres (1,600 ft)	Piazzale Michelangelo	Florence	Italy	70			
	18 June 2022		Iowa State Capitol	Des Moines	United States			25,000	
	26 June 2022		Porta del Paese	Città di San Marino	San Marino	40	Car-ota Gag Garage		
	3 July 2022		Alexandra Palace	London	United Kingdom	67	Go Go Gadget Soapbox		
	3 December 2022	500+ metres (1,600+ ft)	Lansdowne Street	Melbourne	Australia			30,000	
	27 August 2023		Aargauerstalden	Bern	Switzerland	44	Hinteer Dem Lenkrad	28,000	
	8 September 2023	350 metres (1,150 ft)	Abdoun Corridor	Amman	Jordan	39	Team Shalati	10,000+	
	22 October 2023			Tbilisi	Georgia		Tech Crush		
	3 March 2024	250 metres (820 ft)	Ramanaidu Studios	Hyderabad	India	28	Kranken Wagen		
	22 June 2024		Queen Elizabeth Park Road	Edmonton	Canada	58	Cock-A-Doodle Crew	30,000	
	22 June 2024	420 metres (1,380 ft)	Alexandra Palace	London	United Kingdom	59	The Hurry Houdinis		
	31 May 2025		Iowa State Capitol	Des Moines	United States		Rolling Fish Heads	35,000	
	14 June 2025		Capitol Hill	Salt Lake City	United States	48	The Desert Rats	50,000	
	19 July 2025		Downtown	Los Angeles	United States				
	16 May 2026		Downtown	Los Angeles	United States	40	Donut Media		
	13 September 2026		Tallinn Song Festival Grounds	Tallinn	Estonia	45	Yksi Kaksi Kolme - Sauna	24,000	
	4 October 2026		Sandton Drive	Johannesburg	South Africa	57	The Livingroom Referees		

== Prizes ==
The winners of events receive a trophy and various special prizes, such as a trip to the Macau Formula 3 Grand Prix to meet Carlos Sainz Jr. (Hong Kong 2012), a tour of the Red Bull Racing Factory, including a high performance track day (London 2013). In the 2007 Providence race, the three highest scoring teams received trips. A People's Choice Award is given to the audience's favorite team. Prize money is also awarded for the best charity entrant - 5,000 Euros for the 2004 Cork race.

== Reception ==
In 2007, the New York Times contrasted the creative nature of the Red Bull series adult based teams, with the traditional American view of youth based Soap Box Derby, where design options were limited. Reviewing the 2008 Belfast race, the News Letter related that it was "difficult to describe the quality of the lunacy on display" Reviewing the 2011 Los Angeles event, the Huffington Post described it as a piece of wholesome fun so rare in modern-day big cities, and through the various designs and teams it showed creativity and the human spirit, with flashes of great ingenuity and engineering, and capturing the zeitgeist. Previewing the 2015 London event, the Evening Standard described the series as a global phenomenon. Reviewing the 2015 Montreal event, the Montreal Gazette said the races were not for the faint hearted, even for spectators.
