= Wibmer =

Wibmer is a surname. Notable people with the surname include:

- Cornelia Wibmer (born 1979), Austrian para-cyclist
- Fabio Wibmer (born 1995), Austrian cyclist
