= Colorado Freeride Festival =

Mountain bike contest

The Colorado Freeride Festival is the largest freeride bike contest in the United States. It is held annually at Trestle Bike Park in Winter Park, Colorado, typically spanning four days throughout the month of July and includes over 800 international riders. Participating riders compete in various events such as Downhill mountain biking, Cross-country cycling, and Freeride aka. slopestyle competitions. The Festival was suspended in 2018 due to conflicts with local construction projects.

== Results ==
=== Men ===
| Events | Gold | Silver | Bronze |
|---|---|---|---|
| 2013 Slopestyle | Martin Soderstrom (SWE) | Peter Henke (GER) | Anton Thelander (SWE) |
| 2014 Slopestyle | Brett Rheeder (CAN) | Torquata Testa (ITA) | Jakub Venzi (CZE) |
| 2015 Slopestyle | Carson Storch (USA) | Martin Soderstrom (SWE) | Nicholi Rogatkin (USA) |
| 2016 Slopestyle | Matt Jones (GBR) | Nicholi Rogatkin (USA) | Emil Johansson (SWE) |
| 2017 Slopestyle | Nicholi Rogatkin (USA) | Josh Hult (USA) | Max Fredriksson (SWE) |
| 2018 Slopestyle | no event | | |

=== Women ===
| Events | Gold | Silver | Bronze |
|---|---|---|---|
| 2016 Super Downhill | Jacqueline Thomas | Christy Graves | Jill Behlen |
| 2016 Air Downhill | Jacqueline Thomas | Christy Graves | Meaghan Ohara |
| 2017 Super Downhill | Jacqueline Thomas | Sarsha Huntington | Jill Behlen |
| 2017 Air Downhill | Jacqueline Thomas | Lauren Kinney | Meaghan Ohara |
| 2018 Super Downhill | no event | | |
| 2018 Air Downhill | no event | | |
