= Red Bull GmbH =

Austrian conglomerate company

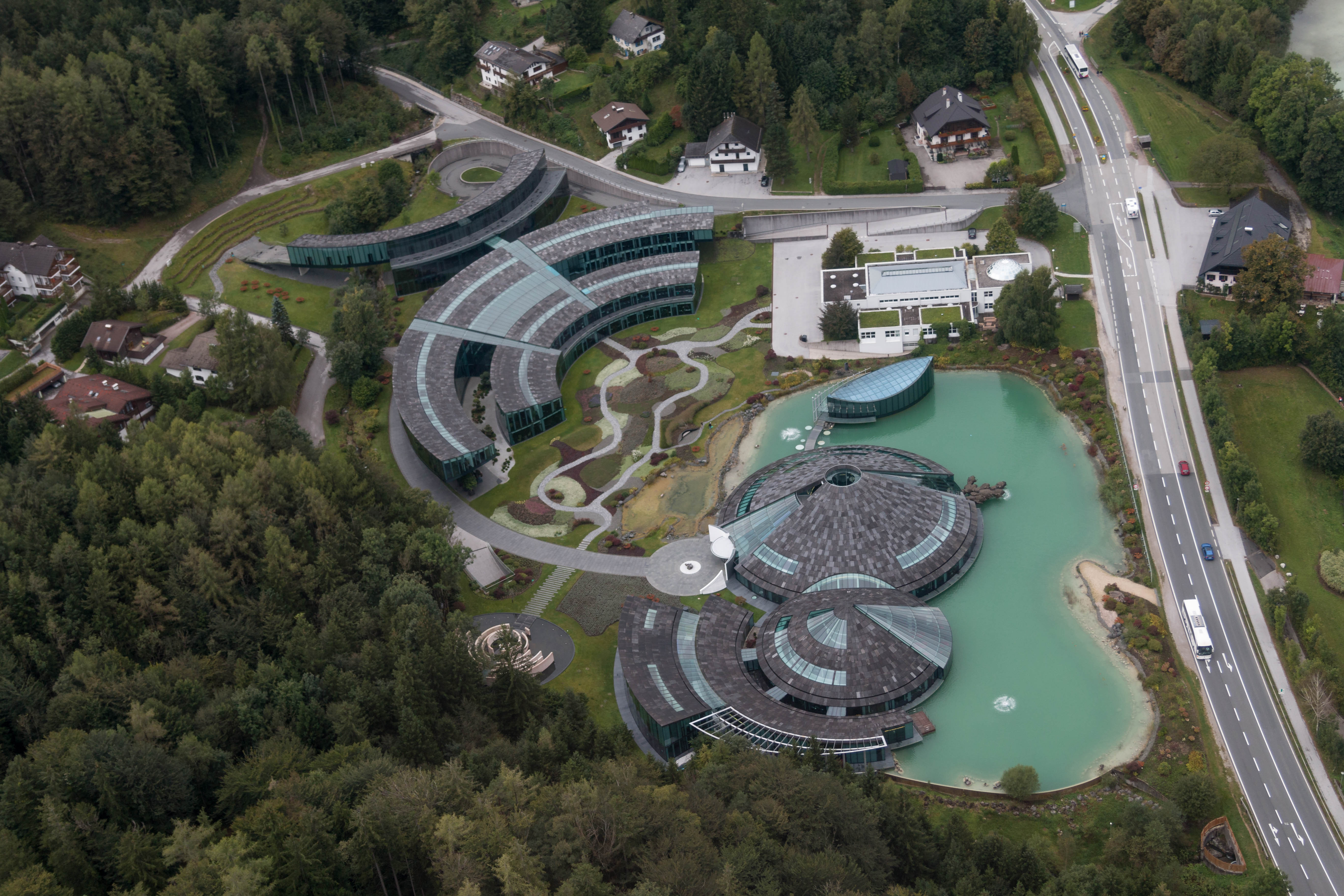
- Headquarters in Fuschl am See, Salzburg, Austria
- Type: Private
- Industry: Conglomerate
- Founded: 1984; 42 years ago
- Founders: Dietrich Mateschitz; Chaleo Yoovidhya
- Headquarters: Am Brunnen 1, 5330 Fuschl am See, Salzburg, Austria
- Area served: Worldwide
- Key people: Franz Watzlawick (CEO Beverage Business); Alexander Kirchmayr (CFO); Oliver Mintzlaff (CEO Corporate Projects and New Investments)
- Products: Energy drink; Clothing; Music
- Brands: Red Bull; AlphaTauri
- Services: Sports; Motorsports; Publishing
- Revenue: ▲€12.196 billion (FY 2025)
- Operating income: ▲€1.3 billion (2018)
- Net income: ▲€650 million (2018)
- Owners: Chalerm Yoovidhya (51%); Mark Mateschitz (49%)
- Number of employees: ▲21,924 (2025)
- Subsidiaries: EHC Red Bull München; EC Red Bull Salzburg; FC Liefering; FC Red Bull Salzburg; New York Red Bulls; New York Red Bulls II; Paris FC (10.6%); Racing Bulls; RB Leipzig; RB Omiya Ardija; Red Bull Bragantino; Red Bull Bragantino II; Red Bull OG; Red Bull Records; Red Bull Racing; Red Bull Powertrains; Newcastle Red Bulls
- Website: redbull.com

Red Bull GmbH (German pronunciation: [ʁɛt ˈbʊl]) is an Austrian multinational private conglomerate company that created the Red Bull range of energy drinks. It is also known for its wide range of sporting events and teams. The headquarters of Red Bull GmbH are located in Fuschl am See, Salzburg.

== History ==
Red Bull GmbH was founded in 1984 by Austrian entrepreneur Dietrich Mateschitz and Thai entrepreneur Chaleo Yoovidhya. While employed by the German consumer goods manufacturer Blendax (later acquired by Procter & Gamble) in 1982, Mateschitz discovered during a business trip to Thailand that a local energy drink named Krating Daeng—produced by Chaleo's company, T.C. Pharmaceuticals—helped relieve his jet lag. Recognizing its potential appeal to Western markets, Mateschitz entered into a partnership with Chaleo to adapt and introduce the drink internationally.

Under the terms of their agreement, both partners invested US$500,000 to establish Red Bull GmbH. Each held a 49% ownership stake, while the remaining 2% was assigned to Chaleo's son, Chalerm. Mateschitz was appointed to oversee the company's management and global marketing strategy.

Between 1984 and 1987, Red Bull GmbH reformulated Krating Daeng to suit European tastes by adding carbonation and reducing sweetness. The resulting product was launched in Austria in 1987 under the name Red Bull. The drink rapidly gained popularity, particularly among young urban professionals, and became synonymous with an active and energetic lifestyle. During the early 1990s, the company expanded throughout Europe, entering the United States market in 1997. Within its first year, Red Bull captured roughly 75% of the American energy drink market.

As Red Bull's global success grew, so did the fortunes of its founders. By March 2012, both Chaleo Yoovidhya and Dietrich Mateschitz were estimated by Forbes to have personal net worths exceeding US$5.3 billion each.

By 2022, Red Bull had expanded its distribution network to over 171 countries and sold more than 11.5 billion cans worldwide, cementing its position as the world's most-consumed energy drink.

In addition to its flagship energy drink, Red Bull GmbH has diversified into other beverage lines, including Simply Cola, the Carpe Diem range of herbal soft drinks, and the Sabai Wine Spritzer, developed in partnership with Siam Winery in Thailand.

In 2018, Red Bull introduced Organics by Red Bull, a line of organic soft drinks made mostly without caffeine.

Red Bull ranked the 12th highest maritime cargo shipping carbon emissions generator in 2021.

== Marketing ==
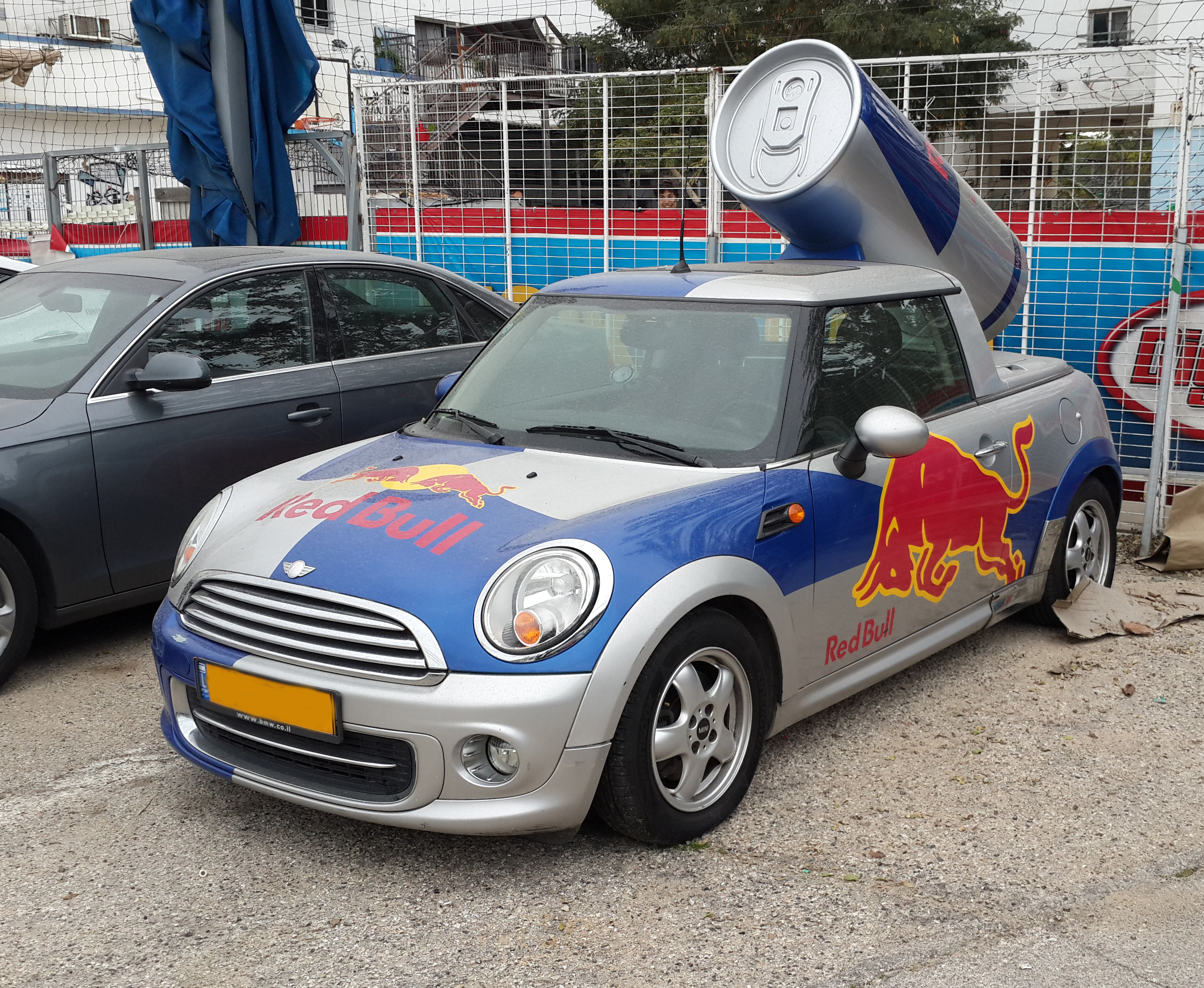
Red Bull advertising car

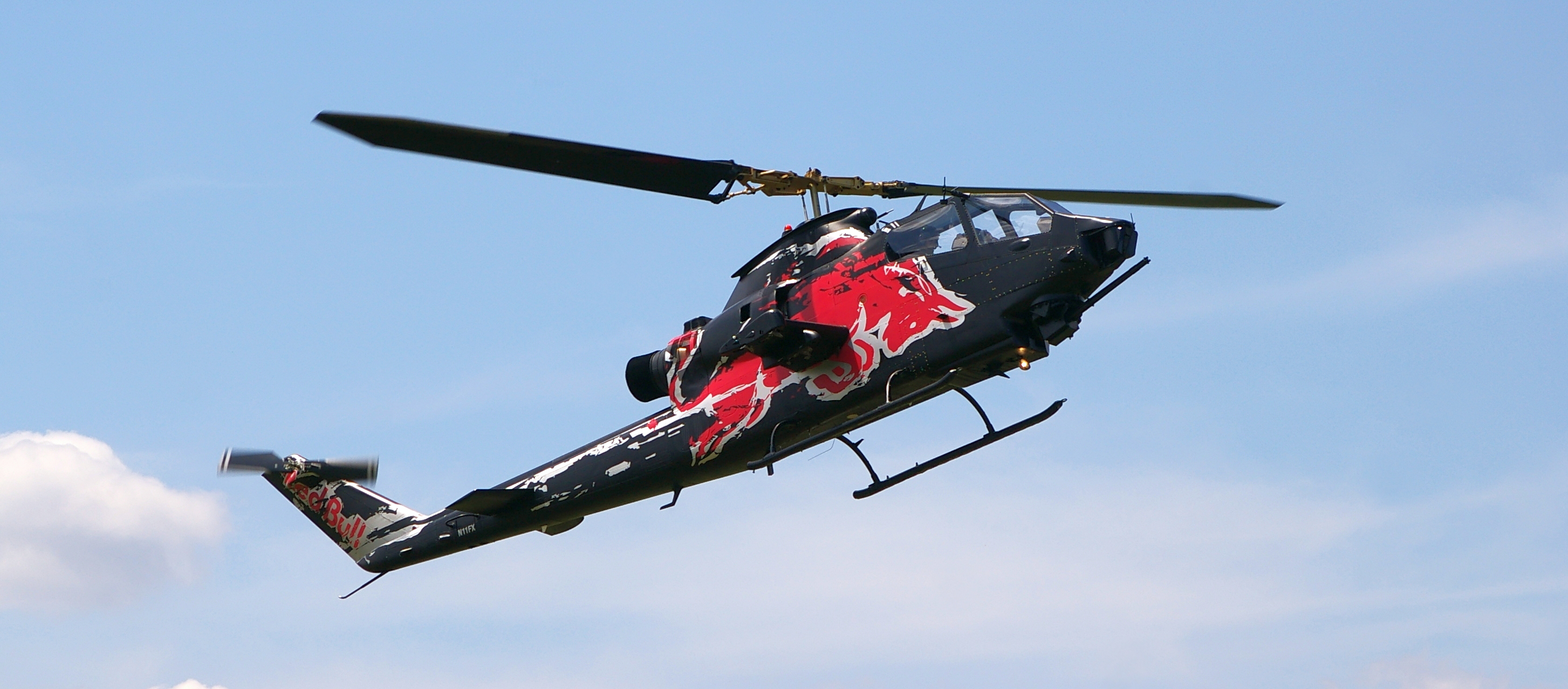
Red Bull's TAH-1F Cobra helicopter assembled by Chuck Aaron, owned by the Flying Bulls

Initially, Red Bull distributed free cases of the drink to college students in an attempt at viral advertising. This strategy was wildly successful, resulting in the rapid proliferation of sales. Red Bull has since become known for its sleek marketing targeted at young urban professionals through various sports and entertainment-based advertising campaigns.

Since 1992, Red Bull is known for making a series of animated commercials under the slogan "Red Bull gives you wiiings", featuring squint-eyed large-nosed characters who grow a pair of wings after drinking the product. To this day, the campaign has been broadcast in over 170 countries worldwide. The commercials were directed by artists Tibor Hernádi and Horst Sambo with the collaboration of Johannes Kastner, the owner of German-based agency Kastner & Partners.

Red Bull uses music and video games, and has enlisted celebrities, such as American rapper Eminem (sponsoring the Red Bull "EmSee Battle Rap championships"). It hosts events such as art shows and the "Red Bull Flugtag" (German for "flight day" or "flying day").

=== Media outlets ===
Red Bull Media House is a media company specialized in sport, lifestyle, music and games.

The company publishes several magazines: The Red Bulletin (lifestyle), Servus (food, health and gardening); Terra Mater (nature, science and history); Bergwelten (alpinism) and Seitenblicke (celebrities).

Other Red Bull Media House divisions are Red Bull TV, Red Bull Photography, Benevento Publishing, Red Bull Music Academy, Red Bull Records, ServusTV and Red Bull Music Publishing.

=== Promotional cars ===
Red Bull has developed the MET (Mobile Energy Team) program. The teams consist of mostly college students, who drive specially designed Red Bull "Racers". The racers are detailed with the Red Bull logo and most carry an oversized can of Red Bull on their chassis (Suzuki Vitara, MiniCooper, SportTrac, etc.). The METs complete daily missions that include sporting events, businesses, colleges, shopping centres, etc. The Mobile Energy Team is trained to know the properties of the energy drink thoroughly and present them to consumers.

=== Promotional aircraft ===
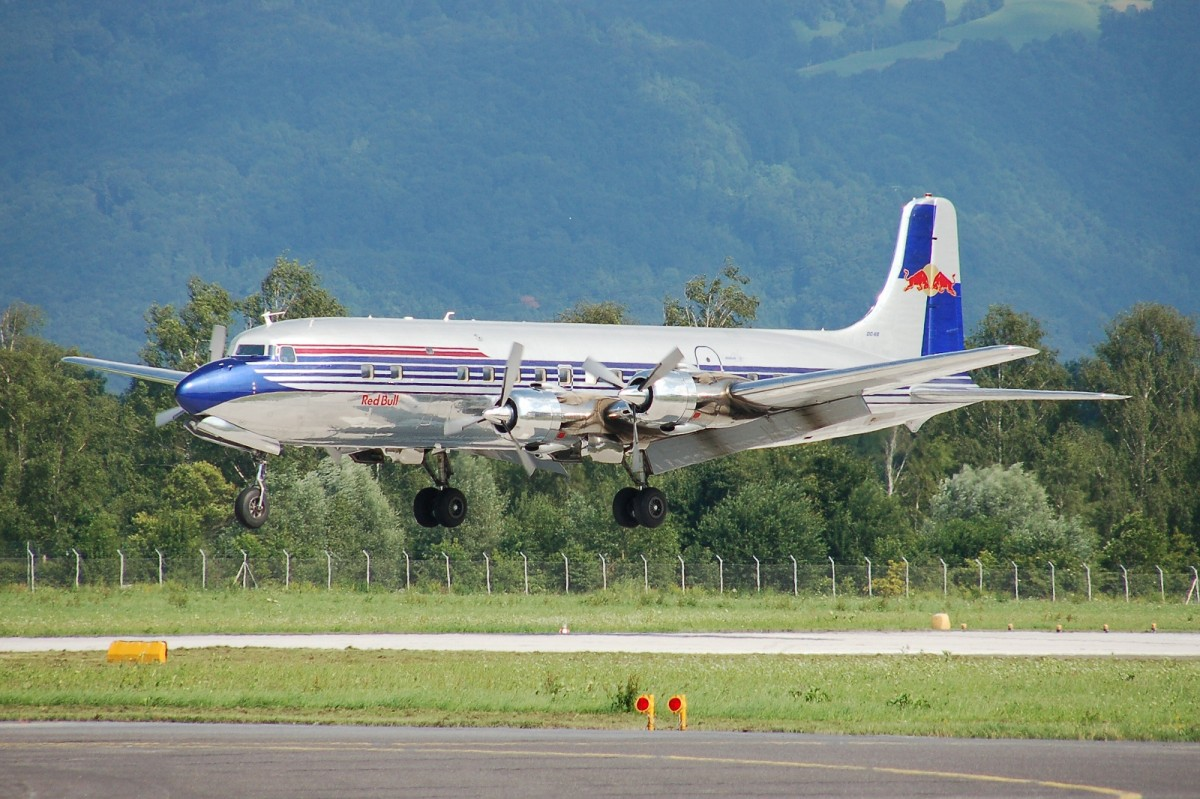
Red Bull's DC-6B landing at Salzburg Airport

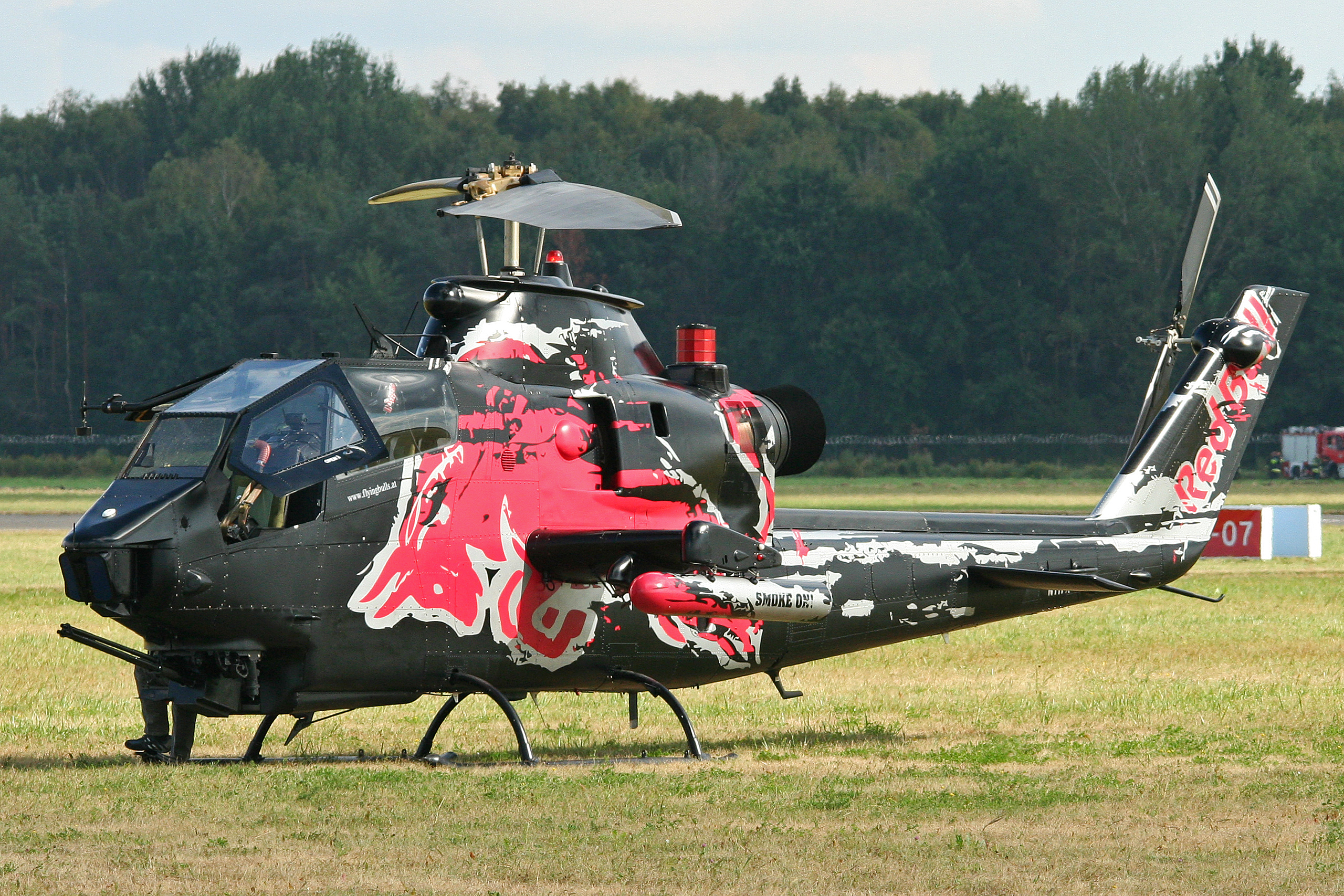
Red Bull's Bell AH-1F Cobra during the 2013 Radom Air Show at Radom Airbase, Poland

-The company operates numerous historic fixed wing and rotary wing aircraft in their promotions under the Red Bull Air Force and The Flying Bulls names:

- Chance-Vought F4U-4 96995 (OE-EAS) (WWII)
- Lockheed P-38L-5LO 44-53254 (N25Y)
- North American B-25J-30NC 44-86893 (N6123C)
- Douglas DC-6B (OE-LDM)
- Bell AH-1F Cobra (N1FX)

=== Music industry ===
The brand is promoted via various music-related activities. In 2007, the company launched its own record label Red Bull Records. It runs the Red Bull Studio recording facility, in Santa Monica. The Red Bull Music Academy organises music workshops and festivals around the world.

The brand also organises and sponsors the famous Red Bull Batalla de Los Gallos, a series of battle rap competitions held in many Spanish speaking countries.

In 2013, it started a talent development program called Red Bull Sound Select. Randy Randall, of No Age, said he was okay working with Red Bull as the company is not owned by a larger company and the branding of the events is relatively low key. In the same year, the Red Bull Amplifier was launched with help from Sidekick Studios. It plans to assist digital startups by giving access to its audience, events, and facilities. In return Red Bull gets associated with trendy startups.

=== Visual arts ===
Red Bull Arts is a visual arts fellowship program launched by Red Bull in 2013 under the name Red Bull House of Arts. The program has multiple locations, including Detroit, Michigan; São Paulo, Brazil; and formerly New York City. The program typically consists of a three-month period during which six to eight participants create new artwork to be displayed at a final exhibition. During the fellowship, artists receive unlimited access to the galleries and a stipend for art supplies. Some of the artwork has been used in Red Bull advertising campaigns.

Art of the Can is international art competition in which artists are asked to create works using Red Bull cans.

=== Video games ===
The brand appears frequently throughout the game Wipeout 2097.

In the PlayStation 3's social gaming platform, PlayStation Home, Red Bull developed its own in-game island, specifically advertising its energy drink and the Red Bull Air Race event (for which the space is named) released in January 2009. In late November 2009, Red Bull produced two new spaces, the Red Bull Illume space, and the Red Bull Beach space featuring the Red Bull Flugtag, both released on the same day. In January 2012, Red Bull released its first personal space called the "Red Bull House of Skate" featuring an indoor skate park.

In the 2010s, Red Bull began sponsoring esports competitors and video game personalities, including American Halo 3 player Richard "Ninja" Blevins, Spanish League of Legends player Enrique Cedeño "xPeke" Martinez, and Swedish Super Smash Bros. player William "Leffen" Hjelte.

The brand also sponsors several esports teams, including Dota 2 team OG (winners of The International in 2018 and 2019), G2 Esports, Cloud9 and T1 (winners of the League of Legends World Championship a record 6 times). It formed a League of Legends team, Red Bulls, which competed in the European League of Legends Challenger Series in 2017 before folding in 2018.

The brand also sponsors several fighting game players who compete in Tekken and Street Fighter.

In the Formula One Esports Series, Red Bull won the drivers championship in 2023-24 and 2025, and the constructors championship in 2019, 2020 and 2025.

=== Sport ===
Red Bull has used sports sponsorships as an advertising vehicle for most of its existence. The company first started sponsoring athletes in 1989, initially focusing on motorsports and extreme sports, and later grew to include more mainstream sports such as basketball and soccer. As of 2016, the company sponsored more than 750 individual athletes and more than a dozen teams.

These range from motorcycle racing, such as MotoGP, Superbike World Championship, Dakar Rally, motorcycle speedway, rugby union, mountain biking, aerobatics, BMX, motocross, windsurfing, snowboarding, skateboarding, kayaking, rowing, wakeboarding, cliff-diving, BASE jumping, parkour, surfing, skating, freestyle motocross, rallycross, Formula 1 motor racing and NASCAR racing to breakdancing.

In the 2000s, the company expanded its sporting team ownership to football, including Red Bull Salzburg, RB Leipzig, and New York Red Bulls. It now operates one of the footballs' largest multi-club ownership groups. The company also owns ice hockey clubs Red Bull Salzburg and EHC Red Bull München.

List of sports clubs and teams owned by Red Bull GmbH
Team	Location	Sport	Ownership		Note(s)
Team	Location	Sport	From	To	Note(s)
EC Red Bull Salzburg	Salzburg, Austria	Ice hockey	2004	present	
EHC Red Bull München	Munich, Germany	Ice hockey	2013	present	
FC Red Bull Salzburg	Salzburg, Austria	Association football	2005	present	
FC Liefering	Grödig, Austria	Association football	2012	present	
Leeds United F.C.	Leeds, England	Association football	2024	present	Minority stake
Newcastle Red Bulls	Newcastle, England	Rugby union	2025	present	
New York Red Bulls	New York, United States	Association football	2006	present	
New York Red Bulls II	New York, United States	Association football	2015	present	
Paris FC	Paris, France	Association football	2024	present	10.6% stake
Racing Bulls	Faenza, Italy	Formula racing	2024	present	Constructor
RB Leipzig	Leipzig, Germany	Association football	2009	present	99% stake
RB Leipzig (women)	Leipzig, Germany	Association football	2016	present	99% stake
RB Omiya Ardija	Saitama, Japan	Association football	2024	present	
RB Omiya Ardija (women)	Saitama, Japan	Association football	2024	present	
Red Bull–Bora–Hansgrohe	Niederndorf, Austria	Road bicycle racing	2024	present	51% stake
Red Bull Bragantino	Bragança Paulista, Brazil	Association football	2020	present	
Red Bull Bragantino (women)	Bragança Paulista, Brazil	Association football	2020	present	
Red Bull Bragantino II	Bragança Paulista, Brazil	Association football	2007	2024	
Red Bull Ghana	Sogakope, Ghana	Association football	2008	2014	
Red Bull Powertrains	Milton Keynes, England	Formula racing	2021	present	Engine manufacturer
Red Bull Racing	Milton Keynes, England	Formula racing	2005	present	Constructor
Red Bull Racing Team	Mooresville, United States	Stock car racing	2006	2011	
Scuderia AlphaTauri	Faenza, Italy	Formula racing	2020	2023	Constructor
Scuderia Toro Rosso	Faenza, Italy	Formula racing	2006	2019	Constructor

==== Motorsport ====
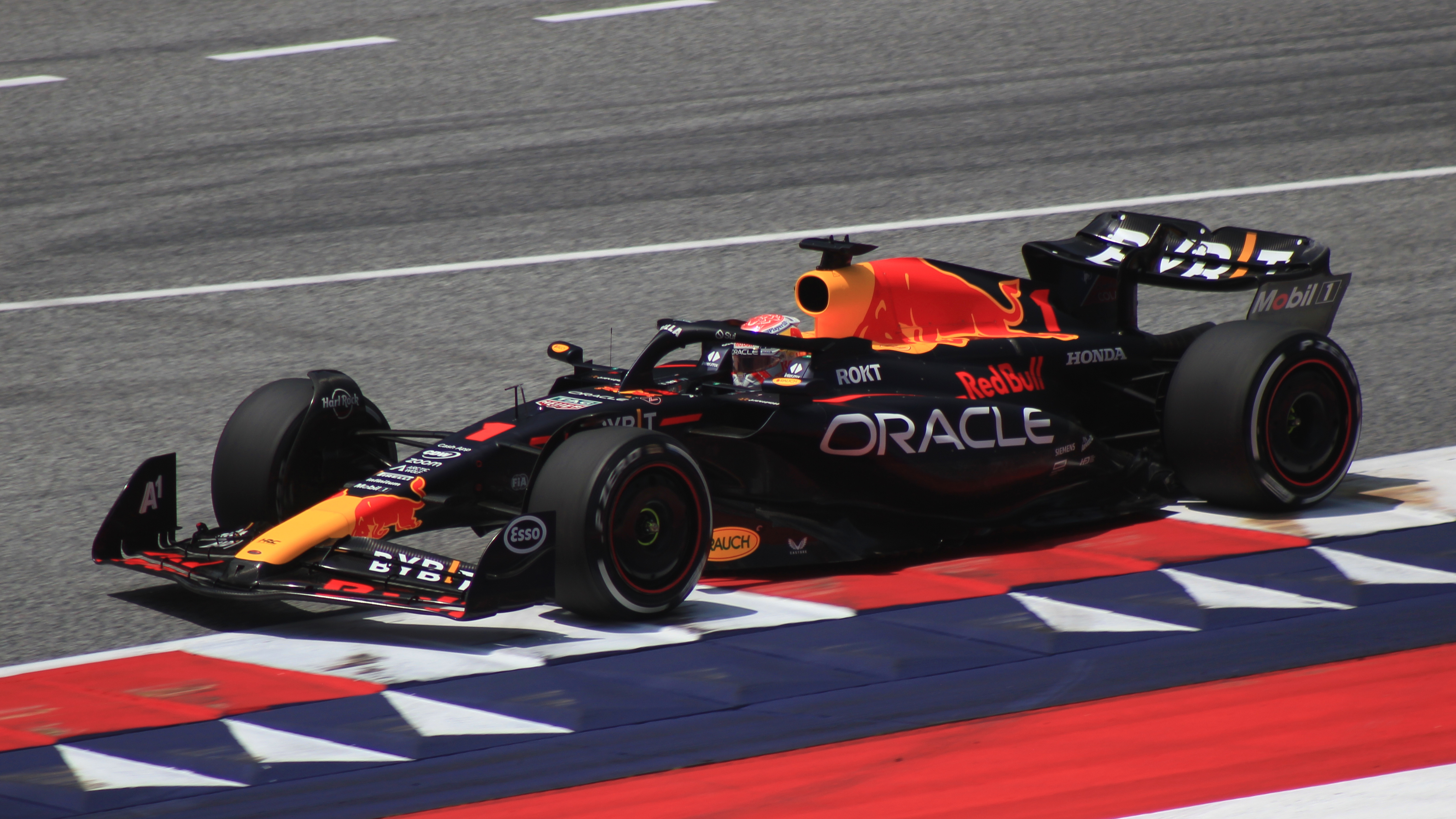
Max Verstappen driving then Red Bull RB19, the 2023 championship-winning car of Red Bull Racing in Formula One

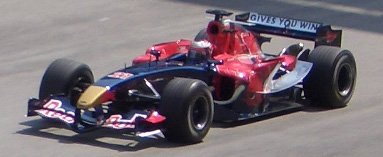
Toro Rosso, a Formula One team for young drivers

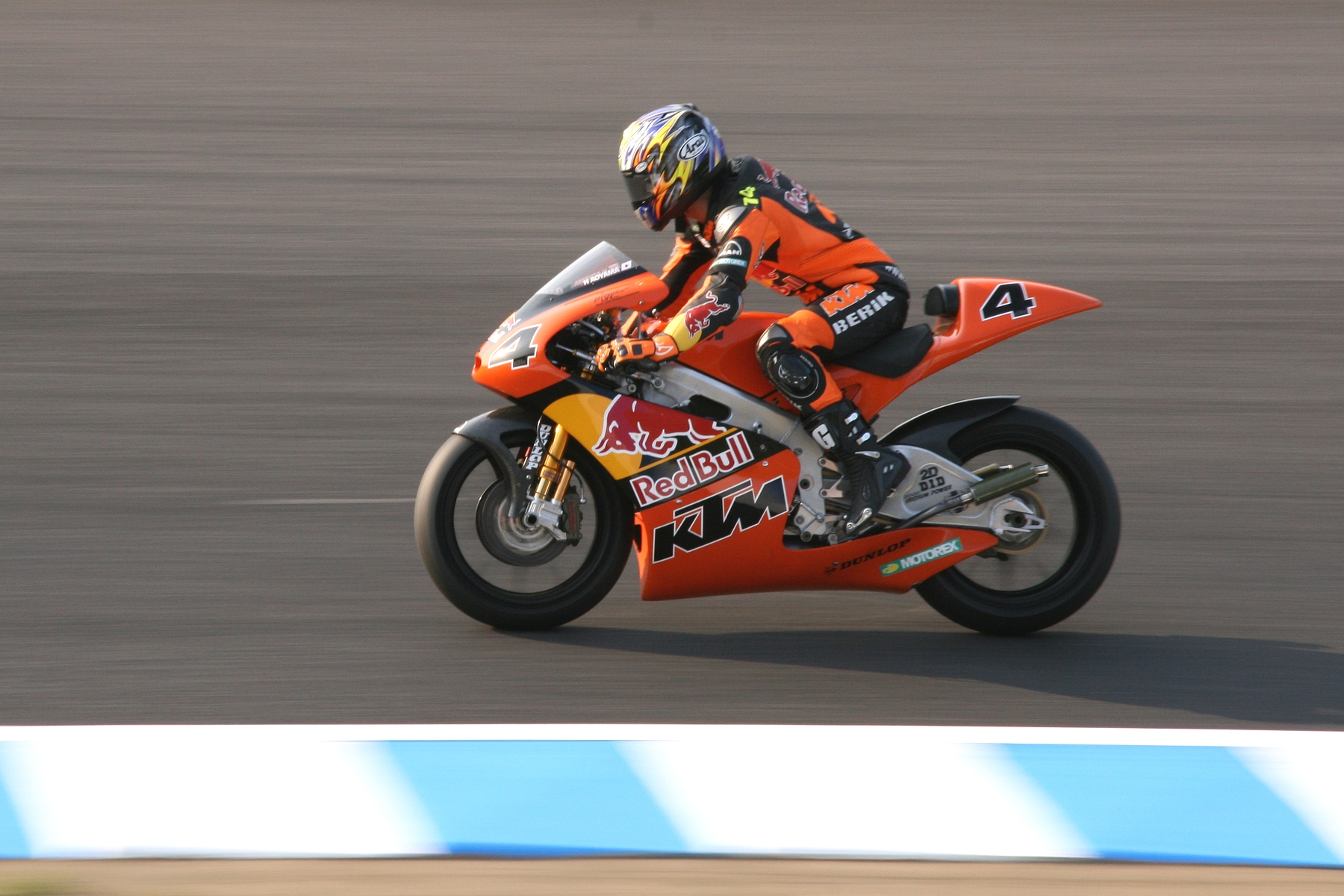
Hiroshi Aoyama riding a Red Bull KTM 250 FRR, at the 2007 Japanese Grand Prix

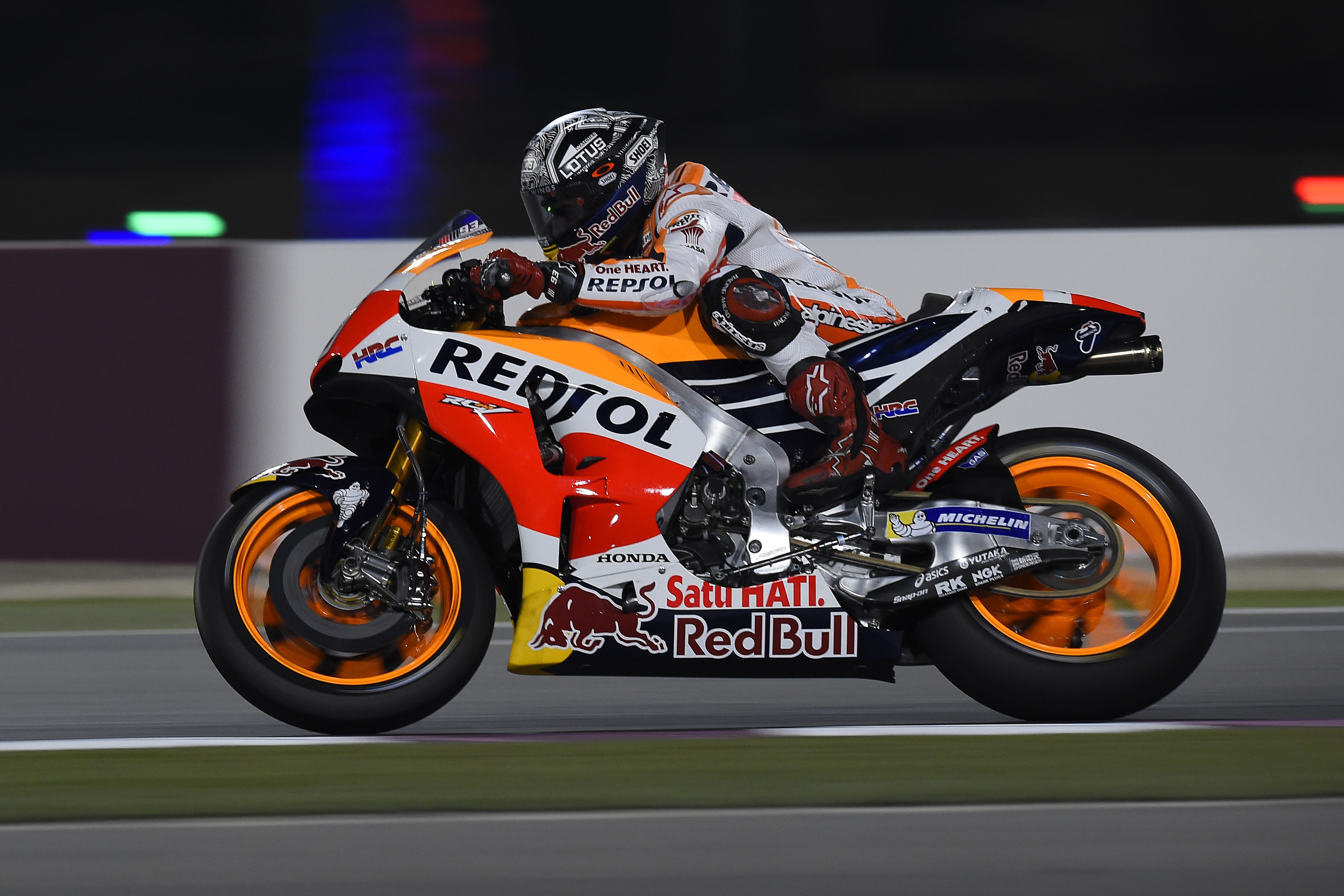
Marc Márquez riding a Honda RC213V with Red Bull sponsoring at Qatar MotoGP testing

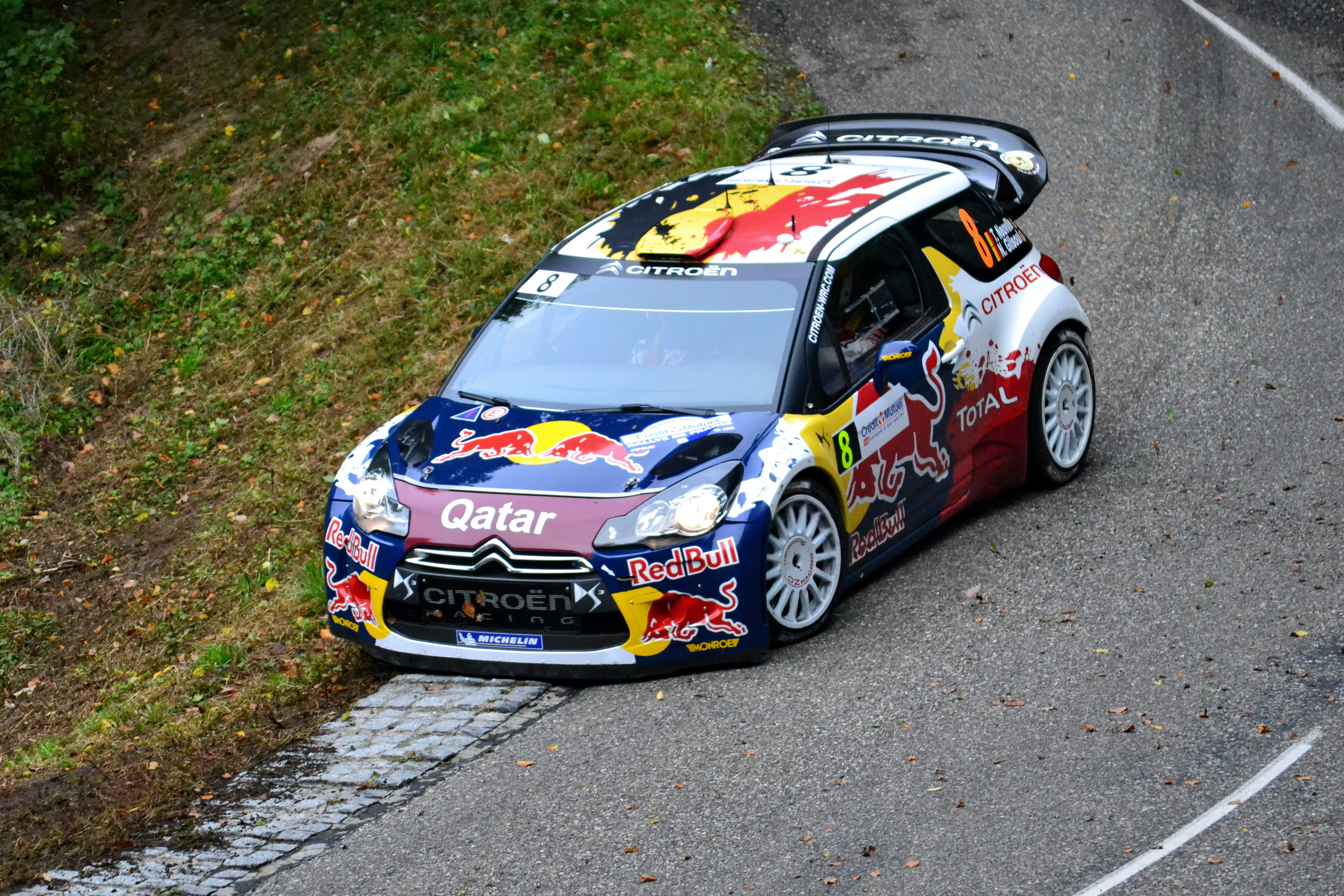
Thierry Neuville driving a Red Bull-sponsored Citroën DS3 WRC at the 2012 Rallye de France

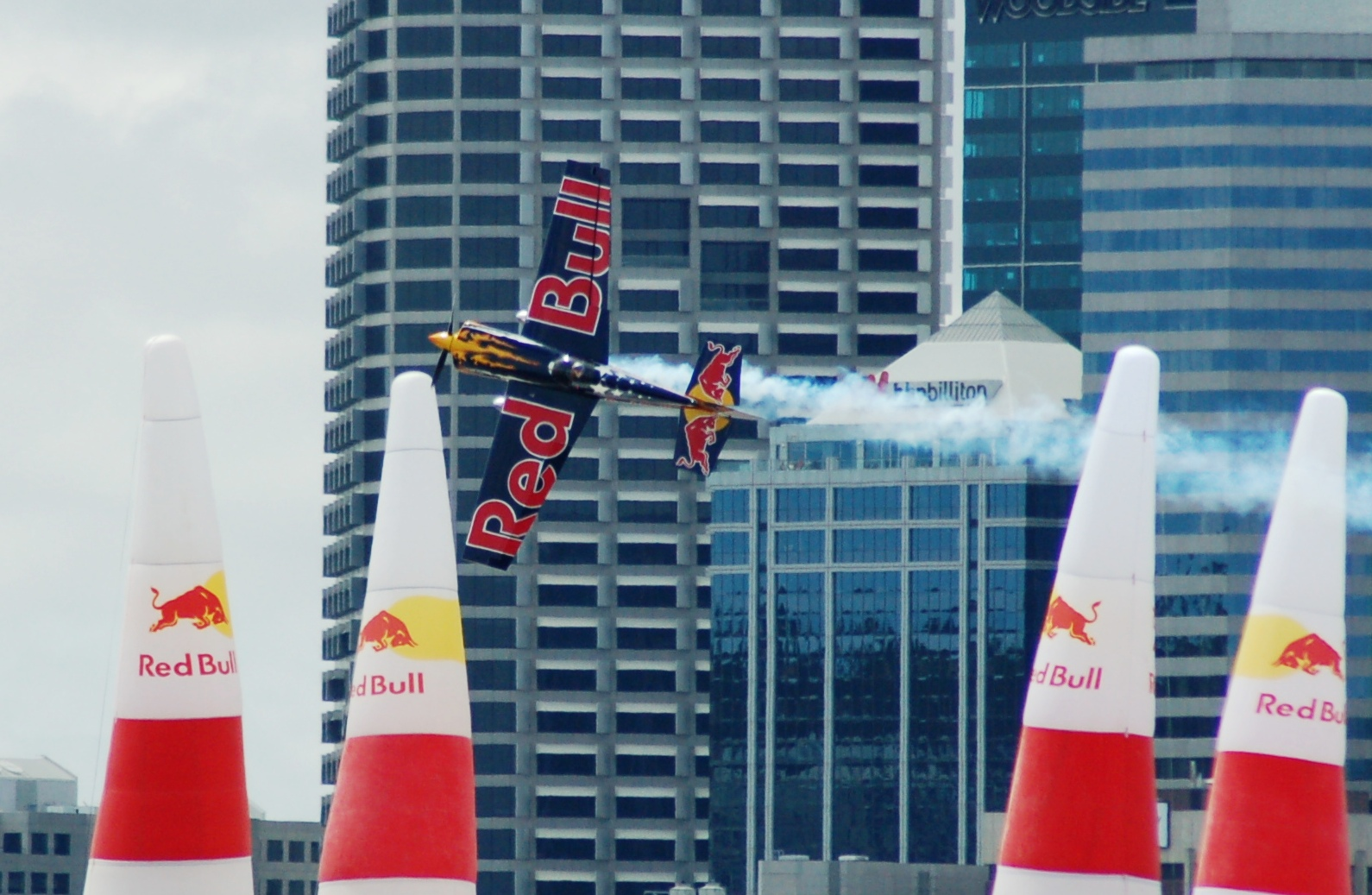
Kirby Chambliss racing in the Red Bull Air Race World Championship

In 1995, Red Bull sponsored its first motorsports team, the Swiss Formula One team Sauber. In late 2004, the company purchased Jaguar to become Red Bull Racing for 2005, The next year it expanded with a second team named Scuderia Toro Rosso (Italian for Team Red Bull) by buying the Minardi team. The latter team was later renamed Scuderia AlphaTauri and currently Racing Bulls. Both teams have scored Grand Prix victories, with Red Bull Racing winning the 2010, 2011, 2012, 2013, 2022 and 2023 Constructors' Championship. Two Red Bull Racing drivers have won the Drivers' Championship; Sebastian Vettel won the championship in 2010, 2011, 2012, and 2013, with Max Verstappen winning the 2021, 2022, 2023 and 2024 Formula One Drivers' Championships.

Red Bull Racing used Renault engines between 2007 and 2018, before beginning a partnership with Honda that lasted until the end of 2025. In 2021, Red Bull founded its own power unit division, Red Bull Powertrains, which began producing its own power units for the Red Bull-owned teams in 2026 with backing from Ford. Former Red Bull Racing chief technical officer Adrian Newey has been credited with designing highly-successful cars that are capable of championship contention. The Red Bull Racing RB19, designed by Newey, was one of the most dominant cars in Formula One history, winning 21 out of 22 races in the 2023 season.

According to former Red Bull team principal Christian Horner in the Netflix original series Formula 1: Drive to Survive, Red Bull is in a unique position wherein they have four drivers (two at Red Bull Racing and two at Scuderia AlphaTauri). He also stated that the two AlphaTauri drivers are Red Bull contracted drivers.

In 2010, the Red Bull Racing engineer Adrian Newey designed a prototype racing car, the Red Bull X2010, for the video game Gran Turismo 5.

In 2022, Red Bull announced a full-on production of a hypercar called RB17, also designed by Newey.

In 2006, Red Bull announced they would be sponsoring the NASCAR Team Red Bull. They debuted in the Nextel Cup Series at Lowe's Motor Speedway. The team was shut down in December 2011 and its assets acquired by BK Racing.

In January 2025, Red Bull announced their return to NASCAR (for the first time since the closure of Red Bull Racing Team in 2011) by sponsoring Shane van Gisbergen (a former driver for Red Bull-sponsored Triple Eight in the Supercars championship) and Connor Zilisch with Trackhouse Racing for certain races in the 2025 NASCAR Cup Series.

The Stock Car Brasil team WA Mattheis was sponsored by Red Bull between 2009 and 2016; Cacá Bueno has won the 2009, 2011 and 2012 championships. The Australian Supercars Championship's Triple Eight Race Engineering has also been sponsored by Red Bull since 2013. Jamie Whincup has won three titles in 2013, 2014 and 2017 and team-mate Shane van Gisbergen won the championship in 2016, 2021 and again in 2022 at the Gold Coast 500.

In motorcycling, Red Bull is a title sponsor of Red Bull KTM Factory Racing and Honda Racing in several disciplines. It also sponsors events such as the motorcycle Erzberg Enduro, where less than two percent of entrants finish the course.

In 2007, Red Bull and MotoGP launched a motorcycle racing series for up-and-coming young riders with no previous Grand Prix motorcycle racing experience. This class was called the Red Bull MotoGP Rookies Cup, and since then a number of newcomers have progressed to the 125cc/Moto3 championship in MotoGP. Prior to the 2013 season, the two-stroke KTM 125 FRR engine was used. 2013 saw the engine change to the four-stroke KTM RC250RBR, following the introduction of the four-stroke Moto3 class.

Red Bull and Ajo Motorsport partnership began in 2012 in Moto3, evolving into a dominant force in Grand Prix racing. The collaboration, built on a shared vision of talent development, expanded to Moto2 in 2017 and is now a key part of KTM's MotoGP program. Aki Ajo, the team's founder, lead the Red Bull KTM Factory Racing MotoGP team in 2025, marking a new chapter in their history.

Red Bull has also sponsored numerous motorsports teams worldwide, including the Abt Audi Sport team in Deutsche Tourenwagen Masters, (Note: Also a general series sponsor) the Kamaz Master in the Dakar Rally, VW Race Touareg Team, Peugeot Sport, the Citroën, Volkswagen, M-Sport Ford and Škoda teams in the World Rally Championship, the SEAT team in the World Touring Car Championship, the Neel Jani and PKV Racing teams in Champ Car, Rhys Millen's Pontiac in Formula D, Arden International (Note: Owned by Red Bull Racing team principal Christian Horner) in the GP2 Series, TOM'S Toyota and Mugen Honda at differing periods in Super GT and Super Formula, and the Red Bull Cheever Racing Team in the IRL.

Red Bull also has sponsored various racing drivers including NASCAR driver Brian Vickers and Kasey Kahne and Formula One drivers Christian Klien and Vitantonio Liuzzi. Red Bull is also sponsor to young Canadian racing prodigy Robert Wickens and teammate John Michael Edwards in the Champ Car Atlantic Series, as well as rally driver Travis Pastrana, MotoGP riders Dani Pedrosa, Marc Márquez, Pol Espargaro, Brad Binder, Stefan Bradl, Joan Mir and Jack Miller, American Superbike (AMA) riders Eric Bostrom, Ben Bostrom and Jake Zemke and British Superbike (BSB) riders Jonathan Rea, Eugene Laverty and Ryuchi Kiyonari.

In 1999 it started sponsoring the Flying Bulls, a Czech aerobatics team. The company promoted the Red Bull Air Race World Championship from 2003 to 2019.

The 2005 DARPA Grand Challenge, a competition for driverless cars, was won by a student team from Stanford. The Team's robotically driven Volkswagen Touareg "Stanley" was sponsored by Red Bull.

==== Extreme sports ====
Since the initial viral marketing campaign, Red Bull's efforts have included sponsoring extreme sport events including cliff diving, BMX, skiing, flying, downhill and free-ride mountain biking and skateboarding. In the 1990s, Red Bull sponsored the rower Xeno Müller, who won an Olympic gold medal in the single sculls in 1996.

Red Bull also owns and conducts the Flugtag ("flight day" in German), a competition where entrants launch themselves off a 10-metre ramp in homemade "flying machines" into a body of water (reminiscent of the Birdman Rally); its own version of the soapbox derby called the Red Bull Soap Box Race; the Red Bull Crashed ice, a world tour, in the winter extreme sporting event, ice cross downhill, which involves downhill skating in an urban environment, on a track which includes steep turns and high vertical drops.

Red Bull is now sponsoring the Cyberathlete Professional League.

Red Bull sponsors the Red Bull Rope Masters competition with the National Double Dutch League for the Annual Holiday Classic at the Apollo Theatre in New York City, an event often dominated by teams from Japan featuring fusion double-dutch (set to hip-hop or contemporary music), and they sponsor other regional events.

==== Football ====
The company has also been highly active in association football. On 6 April 2005, Red Bull bought the Austrian club SV Austria Salzburg and renamed it to Red Bull Salzburg, a move which has been heavily criticised by supporter groups within Austria and across Europe. They also purchased FC Liefering as Salzburg's feeder club.

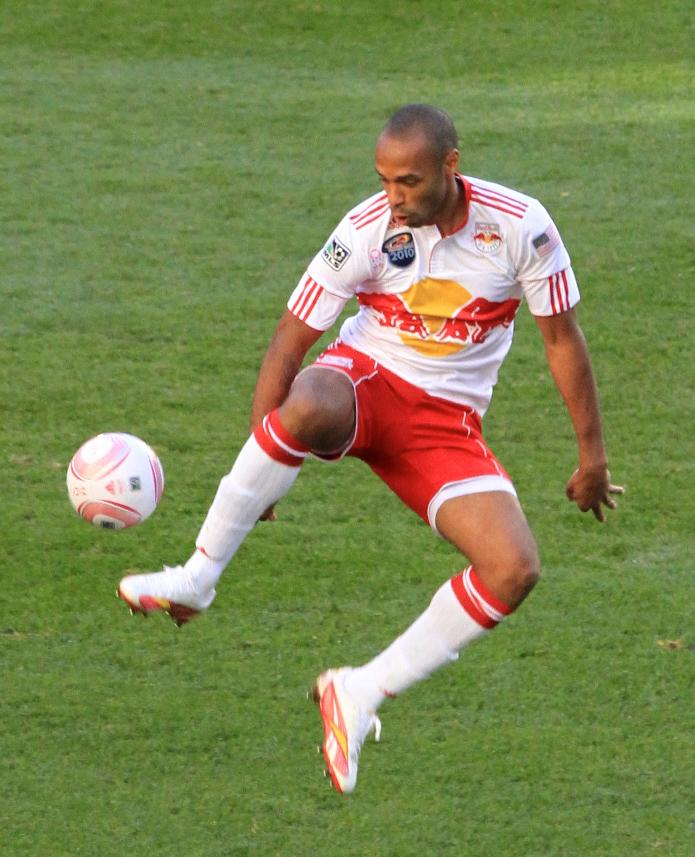
Thierry Henry was one of several high-profile signings by the New York Red Bulls in 2010.

In 2005, Red Bull purchased the MetroStars, a team in Major League Soccer representing New York City, from Anschutz Entertainment Group and renamed the franchise; Red Bull New York is the name of the Red Bull subsidiary that operates the team, while the squad itself is known as the New York Red Bulls. Anschutz Entertainment Group was about to begin building the MetroStars their own stadium, but groundbreaking was delayed a month as AEG completed the sale of the team. The company paid for the team's new stadium, Red Bull Arena (now known as Sports Illustrated Stadium), which had its match opener 20 March 2010.

In 2007, Red Bull founded the lower-division club Red Bull Brasil in the city of Campinas, São Paulo. As the plan to reach the Campeonato Brasileiro Série A in 10 years failed, Red Bull became owners of Série B side Clube Atlético Bragantino in March 2019 and renamed the team to Red Bull Bragantino. Red Bull Bragantino became the champion of the 2019 edition of Série B, and was promoted to the Série A for the 2020 edition.

In June 2009, the company purchased the football licence of German fifth division club SSV Markranstädt based near Leipzig, renaming them RB Leipzig for the 2009–10 season onwards. The company stated that its goal was to reach the country's first division, the Bundesliga, within ten years; this goal was ultimately achieved, with RB Leipzig winning four promotions in seven seasons to secure Bundesliga football starting in 2016–17 season. RB nominally stands for RasenBallsport ("Lawn Ball Sports"), to avoid corporate sponsorship restrictions. RB Leipzig has been divisive and the subject of protests by some fans but has also experienced rapid success, climbing through the German football divisions to get a place in the top-flight German Bundesliga and earning berths in the UEFA Champions League in 2017–2018 and 2019–2020, the latter trip ending with a semi-final loss to Paris St. Germain.

In May 2024, Red Bull acquired a minority stake in Leeds United and became the club's principal shirt sponsor.

In August 2024, the company took over Japanese side Omiya Ardija from previous owners NTT, marking them as the company's first Asian club in their portfolio.

In October 2024, the company announced to purchase a future minority ownership stake at Paris FC.

In January 2025, it was announced that Red Bull became main sponsors of Atlético de Madrid until 2027.

Red Bull also sponsors several other Premier League clubs, including Newcastle United, West Ham United, Crystal Palace F.C., and Everton F.C..

==== Rugby union ====
Red Bull sponsor a number of individual rugby union players including South African World Cup winning captain Siya Kolisi, Ireland international Mack Hansen, and England international Jack Nowell.

They have previously partnered with England national team as their official energy drink partner.

In August 2025, Red Bull completed the purchase of English Prem club Newcastle Falcons.

==== Ice hockey ====
The first team sponsored by Red Bull was ice hockey's EC Salzburg, the city's team in the Austrian Hockey League, during the 1987–88 season. Red Bull acquired the club outright in 2000 and renamed it Red Bull Salzburg. Since 2014, Salzburg has also hosted the company's joint ice hockey and soccer academy.

Red Bull became the title sponsor of DEL team EHC München in 2012, and took full ownership the following year. It also financed the team's new arena, SAP Garden.

==== Cycling ====
Red Bull sponsors numerous cyclists including Danny MacAskill, Fabio Wibmer, Wout van Aert and Pauline Ferrand-Prévot.

In January 2024 Austrian Federal Competition Authority (FCA) announced Red Bull GmbH's planned acquisition of a controlling interests of 51% in RD pro cycling GmbH & Co KG and RD Beteiligungs GmbH, the owner of the professional road cycling team BORA-Hansgrohe.

The FCA approved the acquisition on 29 January 2024. Bora-Hansgrohe's manager Ralph Denk stated "the foundations of our partnership with Red Bull are now officially in place. This is the green light we've been waiting for to go ahead with the formalities and many specific parts of the collaboration."

==== Other sports ====
Red Bull covers the costs to organise the Wings for Life World Run since its first edition in 2014. This permits that the entry fees for the participants can entirely be given to the nonprofit Wings for Life foundation.

The company sponsors the Los Angeles Clippers NBA team and Red Bull 3X, a series of men's and women's 3x3 basketball tournaments.

The Thai unit and its Philippine partner has been responsible in forming, licensing, and funding the Red Bull Barako basketball team in the Philippine Basketball Association (PBA) since 2000. It has become one of the more successful sports teams in the Philippines, winning three championships in the PBA.

Red Bull sponsors the FIVB Beach Volleyball World Tour.

They have also sponsored England cricketer Ben Stokes, and their branding is visible on the back of his bat.

In 2021, Red Bull sponsored Hoang Anh Gia Lai from V.League 1.

Red Bull have expressed interest into expanding into baseball, though no purchase has been made official yet.

==== Athlete sponsorships ====
Austrian Formula One driver Gerhard Berger was the first athlete to be sponsored by Red Bull in 1989. Many of the company's early sponsorships were in lesser-known or extreme sports, including Olympic rower Xeno Müller, who won a gold medal at the 1996 Atlanta Olympics in the single scull race and BASE jumpers Frank "Gambler" Gambalie, Miles Dashier, and Shane McConkey. In the 2010s, Red Bull began expanding its athlete base to include athletes from more mainstream sports, including Austrian tennis player Dominic Thiem, Brazilian skateboarder Letícia Bufoni, American skier Lindsey Vonn, and American Major League Baseball player Kris Bryant.

=== Sports championships ===
==== Motor racing ====
- Formula 1 World Drivers' Championships (8)
  - 2010, 2011, 2012, 2013, 2021, 2022, 2023, 2024
- Formula 1 World Constructors' Championships (6)
  - 2010, 2011, 2012, 2013, 2022, 2023

==== Association football ====
===== Austria =====
- Austrian Bundesliga (14)
  - 2006–07, 2008–09, 2009–10, 2011–12, 2013–14, 2014–15, 2015–16, 2016–17, 2017–18, 2018–19, 2019–20, 2020–21, 2021–22, 2022–23
- Austrian Cup (9)
  - 2011–12, 2013–14, 2014–15, 2015–16, 2016–17, 2018–19, 2019–20, 2020–21, 2021–22
- Regionalliga West (1)
  - 2012–13

===== United States =====
- Supporters' Shield (3)
  - 2013, 2015, 2018
- USL Championship Cup (1)
  - 2016
- USL Championship Players' Shield (1)
  - 2016
- National Premier Soccer League (1)
  - 2014

===== Germany =====
- Regionalliga Nordost (1)
  - 2012–13
- NOFV-Oberliga Süd (2)
  - 2009–10, 2014–15
- Sachsenliga (1)
  - 2013–14
- Bezirksliga Leipzig (2)
  - 2010–11
- Saxony Cup (2)
  - 2010–11, 2012–13
- Regionalliga promotion playoff 1 (1)
  - 2012–13
- DFB-Pokal (2)
  - 2021–22, 2022–23
- DFL-Supercup (1)
  - 2023

===== Brazil =====
- Campeonato Paulista Série A3 (1)
  - 2010
- Campeonato Paulista Série B (1)
  - 2009
- Campeonato Brasileiro Série B (1)
  - 2019
- Campeonato Paulista do Interior (2)
  - 2019, 2020
- Campeonato Paulista Group D (1)
  - 2020

==== Ice hockey ====
===== Austria =====
- Austrian Hockey League (7)
  - 2007, 2008, 2010, 2011, 2014*, 2015, 2016, 2018*
- Continental Cup (1)
  - 2010
- European Trophy (1)
  - 2011

===== Germany =====
- Deutsche Eishockey Liga (4)
  - 2015–16, 2016–17, 2017–18, 2019–20 (RS)

=== Events ===
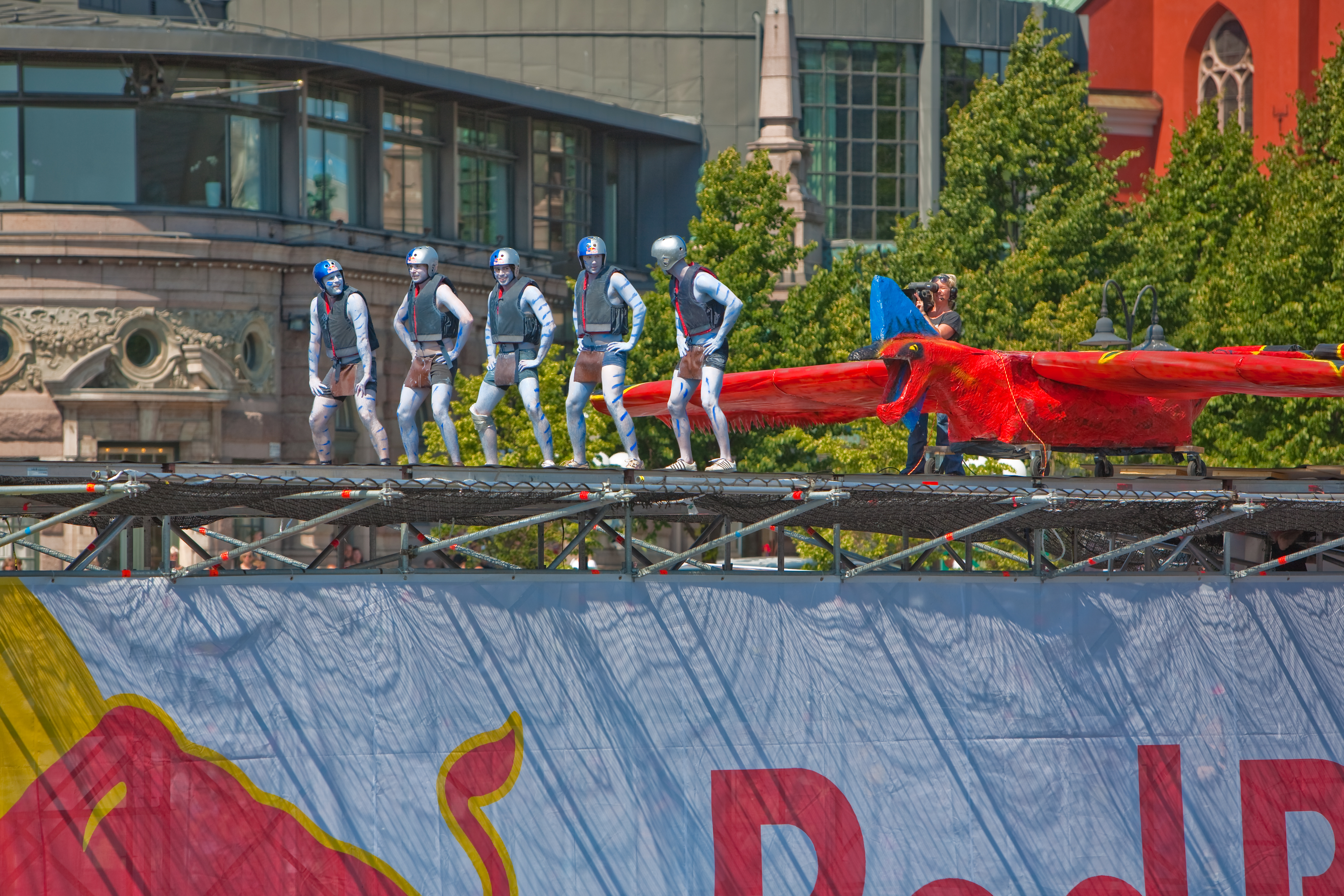
Red Bull Flugtag 2010 in Stockholm

Current and former Red Bull events include ACF Nationals (2009), Air Race World Championship (2003–2019), Argentine motorcycle Grand Prix, Art of Motion, BC One, Big Wave Africa, Cape Fear, Cliff Diving World Series, Crashed Ice, Dolomitenmann, Drifting World Championship, Flugtag, Frozen Rush, Indianapolis motorcycle Grand Prix, King of the Air, King of the Rock Tournament, Last Man Standing, MotoGP Rookies Cup, Motorcycle Grand Prix of the Americas, New Year No Limits, Paper Wings, Rampage, Red Bull 400, Red Bull Joyride, Road Rage, Romaniacs Hard Enduro Rallye, Soapbox Race, Spanish motorcycle Grand Prix, Stratos, Street Freestyle World Champions (2019), Trolley Grand Prix, Unleashed (2015), Wings for Life World Run, X-Alps, Xcbusa, Hardline, and X-Fighters.

==== Legend Events ====
Red Bull hosts the Red Bull Legends Parade, a special event held during Formula 1 race weekends at the Red Bull Ring in Spielberg, Austria. In this parade, Formula 1 racing legends ride their historic car around the circuit, providing a unique experience for fans. In motorcycle racing, Red Bull and MotoGP has announced a Legends Parade event to be held during the Austrian GP. This is the first MotoGP event of its kind and will feature a number of top riders. They will ride historic motorcycles and relive the MotoGP vibes of yesteryear for a nostalgic experience. Several riders have been confirmed to participate in the Legends Parade.

=== Venue ===
Red Bull owns several sports venues, including football stadiums and racing circuits. The most famous stadiums in Leipzig, home of RB Leipzig, and Salzburg, home of FC Red Bull Salzburg. They also own the racing circuit that hosts Formula 1 and MotoGP races. R Here are some of the major venues owned or associated with Red Bull:

- Football Stadiums:

Red Bull Arena (Leipzig): Home stadium of RB Leipzig, located in Germany.
Red Bull Arena (Salzburg): Home stadium of FC Red Bull Salzburg, located in Austria.
Red Bull Arena (New Jersey): Formerly known as Red Bull Arena, now known as Sports Illustrated Stadium, home of the New York Red Bulls.

- Racing Circuits:

Red Bull Ring: A racing circuit in Spielberg, Austria, that hosts Formula 1 and MotoGP races.
