= Natural Science Building (University of Bergen) =

University building in Bergen, Norway

Coordinates: 60°23′5.64″N 5°19′41.47″E

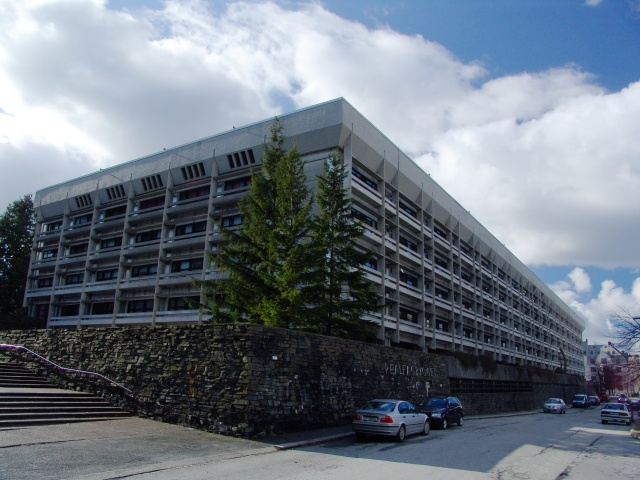
The Natural Science Building

The Natural Science Building (Norwegian: Realfagbygget) is located in Allégaten 41 at Nygårdshøyden in Bergen, right next to Nygårdsparken. The building is a part of the Faculty of Mathematics and Natural Sciences at the University of Bergen. The building was drawn by architect Harald Ramm Østgård, and built between 1963 and 1977. The Sciences Building is one of Norway's largest buildings with 47000 square meters usable area. The building is considered one of the best examples of brutalistic architecture in Bergen.
