= The Red Bulletin =

Lifestyle magazine published by Red Bull GmbH

- Type: International Active Lifestyle Magazine
- Format: Independent magazine
- Publisher: Red Bull Media House
- Founded: 2005
- Language: English, German, French and Spanish
- Website: redbulletin.com

The Red Bulletin is a lifestyle magazine published by Red Bull GmbH, which began in 2005. The headquarters are in Vienna, Austria.

The Red Bulletin features sports, culture, music, nightlife, entrepreneurship and lifestyle stories. Editorial content is controlled in collaboration with local editors.

== History ==
- 2005: The Red Bulletin was first published at the Monaco Grand Prix, printed onsite. From this point on, the magazine became a part of the Formula One season; initially, it started as a daily newspaper on-site.
- 2007: In November, The Red Bulletin became a monthly magazine, first appearing on a regular basis in Austria.
- 2009: The Red Bulletin was launched in the UK, Germany and Ireland.
- 2010: The Red Bulletin was established in New Zealand, South Africa and Kuwait.
- 2011: Publication began in the USA, Switzerland, France and Mexico. In the same year, The Red Bulletin app was launched.
- 2013: From May onwards, an e-paper version for Brazil was available. In addition, the Kuwait version became a "Gulf Edition", thereby addressing other Middle East countries. For the first time, all national issues also became available as a digital e-paper.
- 2014: In June, to coincide with the return of Formula One in Austria, The Red Bulletin went back to its original formula; daily special editions were released for the Grand Prix weekend in Spielberg. Also in this year, The Red Bulletin entered the Asian Market with a South Korean and a Chinese special edition.
- 2015: In November The Red Bulletin became permanently available in a broader market with a monthly South Korean Edition. At the same time, the launch of The Red Bulletin New Zealand was stopped.
- 2016: Reaching out to a business-oriented audience as well as the start-up scene, The Red Bulletin launched its first two line extension issues, The Red Bulletin Innovator, in May and October. Towards the end of the year, The Red Bulletin Ireland and The Red Bulletin South Korea were taken off the market.

== Circulation and distribution ==
The Red Bulletin has a monthly print run of more than 1.4 million copies in four languages (German, English, French) and local country editions in six markets (Austria, Germany, Switzerland, France, United Kingdom, United States). The distribution of the magazine is organized through national and international channels, distributed with carrier partners, as well as available on newsstands and as a subscription worldwide.
