= Nicholi Rogatkin =

American cyclist (born 1995)

Personal information
- Nationality: American
- Born: December 21, 1995 (age 30) Boston, Massachusetts

Sport
- Sport: BMX, Slopestyle,
- Turned pro: 2012

Achievements and titles
- Highest world ranking: 3 (FBM World ranking)
Medal record
Competition
Gold medal – first place	Red Bull Joyride 2018	Slopestyle
Silver medal – second place	Red Bull Joyride 2015	Slopestyle

Nicholi Rogatkin (born December 21, 1995) is an American professional bike rider from Lincoln, Massachusetts, United States. Currently ranked #2 in the World. 2016 World Champion and 2018 Triple Crown Winner. The winningest FMB World Tour athlete with over 25 wins.

== Career ==
Rogatkin started riding BMX at the age of five and became a professional at age 13. Rogatkin won the ASA Triples in Miami and BMX Dirt Worlds in 2013. In 2014, he focused more on mountain biking, and rode the FMB World Tour as a rookie. In the 2015 season, he placed second at Crankworx Rotorua and Crankworx Whistler and became the first rider ever to win both the Best Trick Competition and the main event at Vienna Air King in Vienna, Austria. Nicholi pulled the World's First Cashroll on a Downhill bike. In 2016 Rogatkin did a new trick and named it the Twister. The "Twister" is best described as a 1080 front flip, or a front cork 1080. Rogatkin finished 2016 season in First Place in the Freeride Mountain Bike World Tour Diamond Series and First Place in FISE World Series. In 2017 Rogatkin added another rotation to his own Twister (1080) and landed 1440 while competing at District Ride In Nuremberg, Germany.

On August 18, 2018, Nicholi was the first to win the “Triple Crown” of Crankworx Slopestyle after winning at Innsbruck, Austria, Les Gets, France, and Whistler in British Columbia. In 2019, he helped do motion capture for the Riders Republic video game along with Fabio Wibmer and Tomas Lemoine.

== Wins ==
2013

- 1st BMX Worlds Dusseldorf, Germany
- 1st ASA Triples Miami, FL
- 1st OMarisquino Vigo, Spain

2014

- 1st 26 Trix Leogang, Austria
- 1st OMarisquino, Vigo, Spain
- 1st OMarisquino Best Trick Vigo, Spain

2015

- 1st Panasonic Best Trick Contest - Vienna Air King
- 1st Vienna Air King Austria
- 1st Best Trick 26 Trix Leogang, Austria
- 1st OMarisquino Vigo, Spain
- 1st GlemmRide Slopestyle Saalbach, Austria
- 1st Bike Days Solothurn, Switzerland

2016

- 1st Air to the Throne London, GB
- 1st Air to the Throne Best Trick
- 1st ATs Showdown Best Trick Santa Rosa, CA
- 1st Swatch Rocket Air Thun, Switzerland
- 1st Best Trick Crankworx Les Gets, France
- 1st Swatch Primeline Munich, Germany
- 1st Åre Video Challenge Åre, Sweden
- 1st Red Bull Sky Gate Slope Style Zhangjiajie, China
- 1st EuroBike Progression Session, Friedrichshafen, Germany
- 1st EuroBike Team Battle, Friedrichshafen, Germany
- 1st FISE World Chengdu, China
- 1st 2016 FMB World Tour
- 1st 2016 FISE World Series

2017

- 1st Air to the Throne London, Great Britain
- 1st Crankworx Rotorua Slopestyle in Memory of McGazza, Rotorua, NZ
- 1st Swatch Rocket Air Team Battle (North America), Thun, Switzerland
- 1st Swatch Rocket Air, Thun, Switzerland
- 1st Bike Days, Solothurn, Switzerland
- 1st 26Trix Best Trick Leogang, Austria
- 1st Crankworx Innsbruck, Austria
- 1st Colorado Freeride Festival, Winter Park, Colorado, USA
- 1st O'Marisquino Vigo, Spain
- 1st District Ride Best Trick Nuremberg, Germany
- 1st District Ride Nuremberg, Germany
- 1st FISE World, Edmonton, Canada
- 1st Happy Ride, Barcelona, Spain

2018

- 1st Best Trick DarkFest, Stellenbosch, South Africa
- 1st Swatch Rocket Air Team Battle (North America), Thun, Switzerland
- 1st Bike Days, Solothurn, Switzerland
- 1st FISE World Montpellier, France
- 1st Crankworx Innsbruck, Austria
- 1st Crankworx Les Gets, France
- 1st Big White Invitational, BC Canada
- 1st Crankworx Whistler, BC Canada
- Triple Crown of Slopestyle Winner

2019

- 1st Swatch Rocket Air Team Battle (North America), Thun, Switzerland
- 1st Bike Days Solothurn, Switzerland
- 1st Crankworx Best trick, Whistler, Canada
- 1st Backwoods Jam Best Trick BC, Canada
- 1st Audi Nines Slope Bike Best Trick, Birkenfeld

2021

- 1st Best Trick, Freeride Fiesta, Guadalajara Mexico
- 1st Best Trick, Red Bull Copenride, Copenhagen, Danmark
- 1st Best Trick, Red Bull Roof Ride, Katowice, Poland

2022

- 2nd District Ride Nuremberg, Germany
- 1st Crankworx Cairns, Australia

2024

- 1st Rheeder Slopestyle At SilverStar, Canada
- 1st Big White Invitational, Canada

2025

- 1st Best Trick, Tahoe Games Tahoe, Nevada

2026

- 1st Puerto Vallarta Downhill Freestyle, Mexico
- 1st Red Bull Double Down Bentonville, Arkansas USA
- 1st Red Bull District Ride Best Trick Groningen, Netherlands
