= Red Bull New Year No Limits =

US television series

New Year No Limits was an annual American television special that aired on ESPN from December 31, 2007 until January 1, 2012. It was created, hosted and sponsored by Red Bull GmbH. The program usually aired after the Chick-fil-A Bowl (around 11 pm) until 1 am Eastern Time.

== 2007 ==
The 2007 version originated from the Rio All Suite Hotel and Casino in Las Vegas, Nevada. Joe Tessitore, Mark Schlereth, Cam Steele, and Jamie Little were the commentators.

On this show, freestyle motocross rider Robbie Maddison set a new world record for the longest jump on a motorcycle, jumping 322 feet, 7½ inches. He then made a second attempt, largely because his personal goal was 360 feet. He failed in that attempt, and the second jump was slightly shorter.

Maddison jumped above a makeshift football field set up in the Rio's parking lot, which was used to provide a perspective of the distance.

The show was also scheduled to feature the first-ever backflip in an off-road truck, performed by Rhys Millen, best known for his skills as a drifting race car driver. However, he suffered a back injury in his final warm-up jump when the truck overshot safety barriers. Millen did speak to Schlereth by telephone.

In the original plan, Maddison was to have jumped shortly after midnight ET and Millen's flip was set for 3 a.m. ET. However, because of the overtime finish of the Chick-fil-A Bowl that preceded it, and as a safety precaution due to headwinds at the site, Maddison did not jump until approximately 12:45 a.m. (9:45 p.m. Dec. 31 in Las Vegas). SportsCenter, which was set as interstitial programming, then followed at 1:10 a.m. ET and was re-run in its entirety in place of the canceled Millen stunt.

Angels and Airwaves performed at the end of the show.

Early promotions indicated that New Year No Limits was presented by MGM, the distributor of the upcoming mockumentary release The Poughkeepsie Tapes, though the sponsorship was dropped when MGM decided to shelve that film (which would not be released in any form until 2014).

== 2008 ==
The 2008 New Year No Limits jump once again featured Maddison, and this time the off-road attempt to backflip a truck by Millen was once again on the plan, with the popular Kiwi racer on the docket on the undercard before the motorcycle jump.

At 8:30 pm PT, Millen performed the backflip on the truck, launching at 36 MPH, traveling 80 feet at a height of 50 feet, and landing hard on all four wheels before the truck rolled.

Shortly after the stroke of the new year in the Eastern Time Zone (about 35 minutes later), Maddison successfully connected on a ten-story-high jump, landing on top of a replica of the Arc de Triomphe at a Las Vegas casino. While that was successful, he lacerated his left hand on the ensuing 60-foot drop.

== 2009 ==
The 2009 New Year No Limits moved west to Long Beach, California, where Travis Pastrana, a four-time Rally America champion and part-time WRC driver, jumped a Subaru Impreza STI rally car off the Pine Avenue pier, soaring 269 feet on Rainbow Harbor, and landed on a floating barge shortly after 9 pm Pacific Time. He celebrated by hitting a backflip off the landing ramp into Rainbow Harbor.

== 2010 ==
The 2010 New Year No Limits was planned to move to San Diego, California, where Levi LaVallee, a seven-time Winter X Games medalist and champion snocross racer, was to attempt to jump his Polaris snowmobile longer than ever before and eclipse the current record of 301 feet. The event would have taken place at the Embarcadero Marina Park in the Port of San Diego. Embarcadero is Spanish for “landing place,” making it an appropriate location for LaVallee’s jump.

On Friday December 17, Red Bull officially announced that Levi Lavallee was injured during a practice run and would be unable to make his record-setting attempt during the special telecast. As a result, there was no New Year, No Limits event for 2010. During the practice sessions leading up to the event Levi managed to land a record-setting 361-foot jump shattering the old record of 301 1/2 feet. Since the official event for the attempt did not take place the practice run has been submitted for the official world record title. An episode of SportsCenter aired in place of New Year No Limits.

== 2011 ==
The 2011 edition of New Year No Limits featured LaVallee making a second attempt at crossing San Diego Bay while Robbie Maddison attempted to do the same on a motorcycle; the two attempts took place side-by-side. The event was televised on ESPN and was also broadcast on the Internet via ESPN3.

LaVallee set a new World Record unofficially during his jump landing at a distance of 412 ft. Robbie Maddison landed his jump at 378 ft, 9 inches also an unofficial World Record, but short of his stated goal of 400 ft.

== Cancellation ==
The program would not air in 2012 into 2013, and was effectively cancelled with the launch of the College Football Playoff on ESPN in 2014, which effectively monopolized New Year's Eve and New Year's Day with bowl programming rather than a need for counterprogramming.
