= Xcbusa =

Paraglading competition

The XCBusa is a paragliding competition in the northern alps in Italy by the lake Garda.

== History ==
The Contest its born in Riva del Garda Italy made by the italian Pilot Michele Marchi Vidi

== Rules ==
The pilots has 5 try to make a flight for the final score. The flight has to be declared before taking off. The best 3 flight will be taken for the final score using the xcontest scoring system.

== XCBusa 2014 ==
=== Results ===
1 - (Italy) Italo Miori

2 - (Italy) Roberto La Fauci

3 - (Italy) Moreno Parmesan

== XCBusa 2015 ==
=== Results ===
1 - (Italy) Moreno Parmesan

2 - (Italy) Italo Miori

3 - (Italy) Giorgio Tonetta

== XCBusa 2016 ==
=== Results ===
1 - (Italy) Moreno Parmesan

2 - (Italy) Matteo Marega

3 - (Italy) Ermanno Dossi

== XCBusa 2017 ==
=== Results ===
1 - (Austria) Helmut Schrempf

2 - (Italy) Manuel Schmiedhofer

3 - (Italy) Italo Miori

== XCBusa 2018 ==
=== Results ===
1 - (Italy) Piero Franchini

2 - (Italy) Italo Miori

3 - (Italy) Stefano Sottroi

== XCBusa 2019 ==
=== Results ===
1 - (Italy) Andrea Conci

2 - (Italy) Giovanni Gallizzia

3 - (Italy) Ivan Centa
