= Red Bull Street Freestyle World Champions 2019 =

Freestyle Football Finals

- Genre: Freestyle Football competition
- Created by: Steve Elias
- Presented by: Sean Garnier, Dan Woods, Lukas Skoda
- Judges: Louis Nani; Pavel Pardo; Carlos Iacono; Andrew Henderson
- Country of origin: United States
- Original language: English
- No. of seasons: 1
- No. of episodes: 10

Production
- Executive producer: Steve Elias
- Running time: 60–120 minutes
- Production company: Red Bull

Original release
- Network: Red Bull TV
- Release: November 15 – November 19, 2019

Red Bull Street Style World Championship 2019 was a freestyle competition where qualified freestylers took part in the finals of Freestyle Football. Competitors exhibited their top tricks and unique moves in a 2v2 battle format held over three minutes. The 2019 finals took place at WynWood village, Miami Beach, Florida. It was won by Ricardo Fabiano Chahini in men`s category and Melody Donchet in the women category

== Format ==
To take part in the final competition, the competitor must have been a champion in their country. Competitors revealed their top tricks and unique moves in a three minute 2v2 battle format. Three minutes in the centre ring, two players, one ball and one winner is announced by the judges. Each participant performs for three 30-second routines, judges looked for creative combination on floor and performing tricks with foot, head and body moves. Scores are based on the quality of execution and control as well as style, energy and rhythm. Competitors can never use their hands and dropped balls are frowned upon.

== Contestants ==
=== Men`s category ===
Country/Territory	Contestant	Date of birth	Height	Hometown
Netherlands	Jesse Marlet	5 March 1998	1.80 m (5 ft 11 in)	Amsterdam
Poland	Michal Rycaj	25 July 1990	1.72 m (5 ft 7 1/2 in)	Warsaw
Norway	Tobias Brandal Busaet	26 February 1992	1.78 m (5 ft 10 in)	Oslo
Norway	Erlend Fagerli	19 June 1997	1.75 m (5 ft 9 in)	Tromsø
France	Gautier Jean Marie	1 January 1990	1.75 m (5 ft 9 in)	Paris
Poland	Szymon Maciej	25 April 1990	1.73 m (5 ft 8 in)	Warsaw
Norway	Brynjar Fagerli	18 August 1994	1.73 m (5 ft 8 in)	Tromsø
Poland	Lukasz Czeslaw	21	1.78 m (5 ft 10 in)	Warsaw
Colombia	Sebastien Oritz Hernandez	16 July 1994	1.78 m (5 ft 10 in)	Colombia
Brazil	Pedro Henrique de Oliviera	31 July 1995	1.70 m (5 ft 7 in)	Rio de Janeiro
Philippines	Phillip Warren Gertsson	24 July 1991	1.75 m (5 ft 9 in)	Manila
Sweden	Emil Kalldoff	17 December 1995	1.73 m (5 ft 8 in)	Hamilton
Mexico	Estaban Hernandez Acosta	27 March 1991	1.73 m (5 ft 8 in)	La Paz
Japan	Yo Katsuyama	26 June 1997	1.68 m (5 ft 6 in)	Nagoya
Brazil	Ricardo	16 February 1998	1.78 m (5 ft 10 in)	Belém
Australia	Jordan Valentio Morisson	19	1.74 m (5 ft 8 1/2 in)	New South Wales

=== Women category ===
Country/Territory	Contestant	Hometown
Slovakia	Lucia Kevicka	Nitra
Netherlands	Laura Dekker	Amsterdam
Venezuela	Laura Biondo	Oslo
United States	Caitlyn Schreffer	Tromsø
Poland	Agnieszka Mnich	Warsaw
Poland	Kalina Matysiak	Warsaw
France	Melody Donchet	Paris
France	Yoanna Dallier	Warsaw

== Champions ==
Ricardinho from Brazil won the men`s category while Melody Donchet from France won the women`s category.

== Media ==
The competition was broadcast in six languages on various television shows and on various social media pages and YouTube channels for both World Football Freestyle Association and Red Bull with over million viewers. Over 3000 spectators attended the event physically.

== Judges ==
The judges in the final competitions were Louis Nani, Pavel Pardo, Daniel Mikolajek, Carlos Iacono and Andrew Henderson.

== Venue ==
The competition took place at Wynwood

== Sponsors ==
The event was sponsored by Red Bull (Title sponsor), others were World Freestyle Football Association, SWRL.

== Opening ceremony ==
The opening ceremony of the 2019 Red Bull Street Style champions took place at Wynwood park on 15 November 2019.
