= The Flying Bulls =

Aircraft collection and aerobatic team

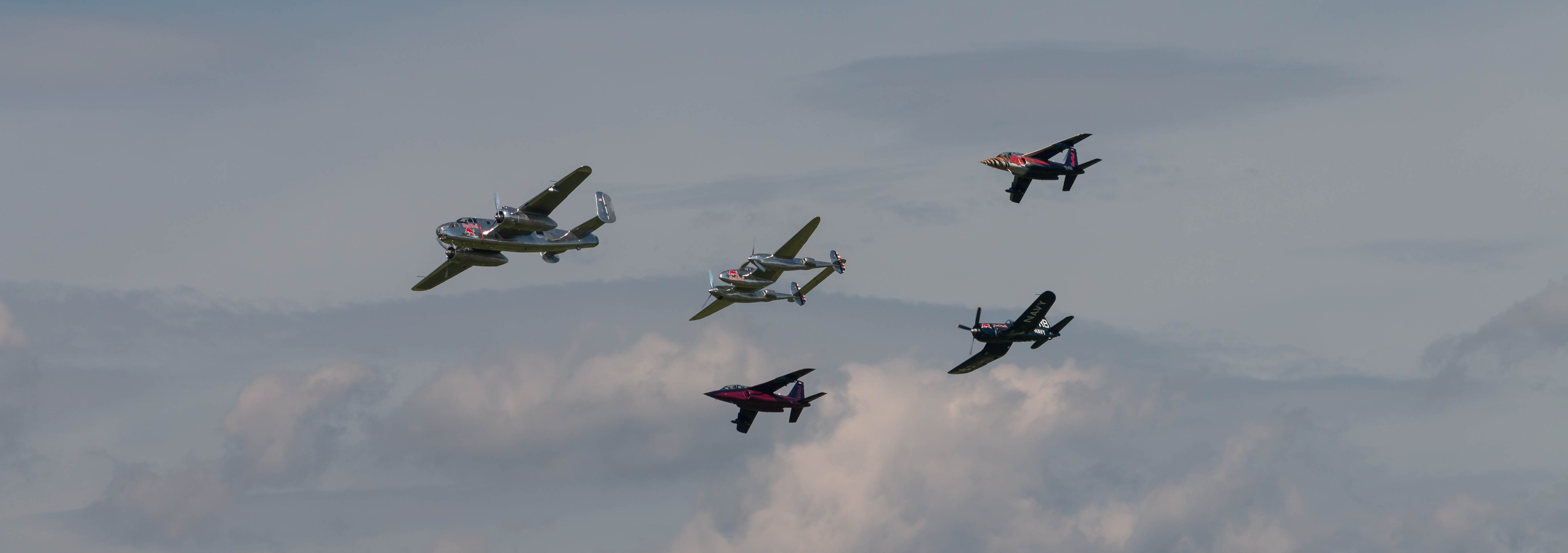
Flying Bulls at Airpower 2019

The Flying Bulls are a private aircraft fleet stationed in Salzburg, Austria, formerly owned by the founder of Red Bull, billionaire and aviation lover Dietrich Mateschitz.

The Flying Bulls are based at Hangar 7 in Salzburg, which was built by Red Bull specifically for their needs. Hangar 7 is open for public display, while the next door Hangar 8 is used for maintenance and restoration.

== History ==
The collection of the Flying Bulls goes back to the aerobatic pilot Siegfried "Sigi" Angerer (1949-2022). He had his first flying expieriences at the time he was 15 years old. In his lifetime he completed over 24,000 flights across 70 different aircraft types. In 1990 he met Mateschitz at an airshow in Innsbruck, Austria, where he was performing with his F4U Corsair. After teaching Mateschitz how to fly on a Piper PA-18, he gained him (and Red Bull) as a sponsor for his aircraft. Together they founded the Flying Bulls in 1999. Angerer was chiefpilot until his retirement in 2012.

The Flying Bulls have collecting rare aircraft like the Douglas DC-6B, formerly used as the presidential airplane for the Yugoslav leader Tito, a Pilatus PC-6, several demilitarized Alpha Jets, as well as multiple helicopters like the Bell AH-1 Cobra. In 2009 a Lockheed P-38L Lightning joined the fleet.

Furthermore the collection consists of a fully aerobatic Bölkow Bo 105, a Bell 47, a North American T-28, a North American B-25J, a Chance Vought F4U, amphibious aircraft like the Cessna 208 Amphibian and Aviat Husky, a Stearman PT-17, a Fairchild PT-19, as well as a P-51D since 2021.

In 2013 a Bristol 171 Sycamore was restored to airworthy condition again, and is the only airworthy example in the world. In 2023 the Flying Bulls acquired a Sikorsky S-58.

In May 2026 it was announced that a F-86 would join the fleet together with its pilot Frédéric Akary.

== Fleet ==
The Flying Bulls fleet consists of various aircraft and helicopters. Some of them are equipped specifically for TV broadcasting and photo flights. The majority is displayed at airshows and events. Among the fleet are european or worldwide rarities such as the Douglas DC-6B, the Canadair F-86 or the Bristol 171.

Tables correct as of may 2026

Aircraft
picture	type	registration	year of construction
	Aviat Husky	OE-CKW	2006
	Beech T-34	OE-ADM	1955
	Boeing PT-17	OE-AMM	1943
	Canadair F-86 MK6	F-AYSB	1956
	Cessna 337 Skymaster	N991DM	1969
	Cessna 208 Amphibian	OE-EDM	1996
	Chance Vought F4U-4	OE-EAS	1945
	Douglas DC-6B	OE-LDM (ex N996DM)	1958
	Extra 300 LX	OE-ARN OE-ARO	2013
	Fairchild PT-19	N50429	1943
	Grumman F8F-2	N68RW	1947
	Lockheed P-38	N25Y	1944
	North American B-25J	N6123C	1945
	North American P-51D	OE-EFB	1944
	North American T-28B	OE-EMM	1955
	North American T-6	OE-ERB	1942
	P.68TC	OE-FSE	2022
	Pilatus PC-6	OE-EMD	1998
OE-FAS	Dornier Alpha Jet	OE-FAS^{1} OE-FRB^{1} OE-FDM^{1}	1980/81

^{1} all Alpha Jets were withdrawn from use on 22^{nd} of August 2025 for an unknown reason

Helicopters
picture	type	registration	year of construction
	AS 350 B3+	OE-XTV	2009
	Bell 209/AH1F	N11FX	1967
	Bell 47 G-3B-1	OE-XDM	1966
	Bristol 171 Sycamore	OE-XSY	1957
	Eurocopter EC135	OE-XFB	2006
D-HTDM	MBB BO 105C	D-HSDM; D-HTDM	1974
	MBB BO 105S - Media	D-HUDM	1993

== Current pilots ==
The Flying Bulls have a number of pilots who are specifically trained for certain aircraft.

pilot	function	operated types
Eskil Amdal	Pilot & CEO	DC-6B, P-38, P-51, F4U-4, F8F-2,T-28B, T-6, PT-17, T-34, Extra 300 LX
Raimund Riedmann	Flight operations manager & chiefpilot fixed wing aircraft	DC-6B, B-25J, P-38, P-51, F4U-4, T-28B, T-6, PT-17, PT-19, T-34, Cessna 337, Cessna 208 Amphibian, Aviat Husky, Extra 300 LX, P.68
Mirko Flaim	Flight operations manager & chiefpilot rotary aircraft	AH-1F, Bo.105/Bo.105S, EC135, AS 350, Bell 47
Frederic Akary	Pilot	F-86
Stefan Doblhammer	Pilot	(Alpha Jet)
Eric Goujon	Pilot	F4U-4, PC-6, Extra 300 LX
Frederic Handelmann	Pilot	DC-6B, B-25J, T-6, Extra 300 LX
Miguel Hochleitner	Pilot	F4U-4, T-28B, PC-6, Extra 300 LX
Hans Pallaske	Pilot	T-34, PC-6, Cessna 337, Cessna 208 Amphibian
Ludwig Reiter	Pilot	B-25J, PT-17, PT-19, T-34, Cessna 208 Amphibian, Aviat Husky, Extra 300 LX, P.68
Nicolas Rossier	Pilot	P-51, T-28B, T-6, Extra 300 LX
Matthias Schwaighofer	Pilot	AH-1F, Bo.105/Bo.105S, EC135, AS 350, Bell 47
Siegfried Schwarz	Pilot & retired chiefpilot	AH-1F, Bo.105/Bo.105S, EC135, Bristol 171, AS 350, Bell 47
Rainer Wilke	Pilot	Bo.105

== Accidents and incidents ==
A Bede BD-5J "Microjet" (N53EJ) crashed in the afternoon of the first of May 2013 near Baumkirchen (Tyrol). The German pilot Guido Gehrmann reported problems and contemplated an emergency landing on the Inntalautobahn, however he had to land near Mils. The aircraft collided with a slope, resulting in the death of the pilot.

In June 2021, a North American T-28B (OE-ESA) crashed near Jickovice (Czech Republic) on the return flight from an airshow in Poland. The aircraft impacted terrain during a low level barrel roll. The pilot Rainer Steinberger suffered fatal injuries. The photographer on the second seat survived with major injuries.
