= Nygårdsparken =

Public park in Bergen, Norway

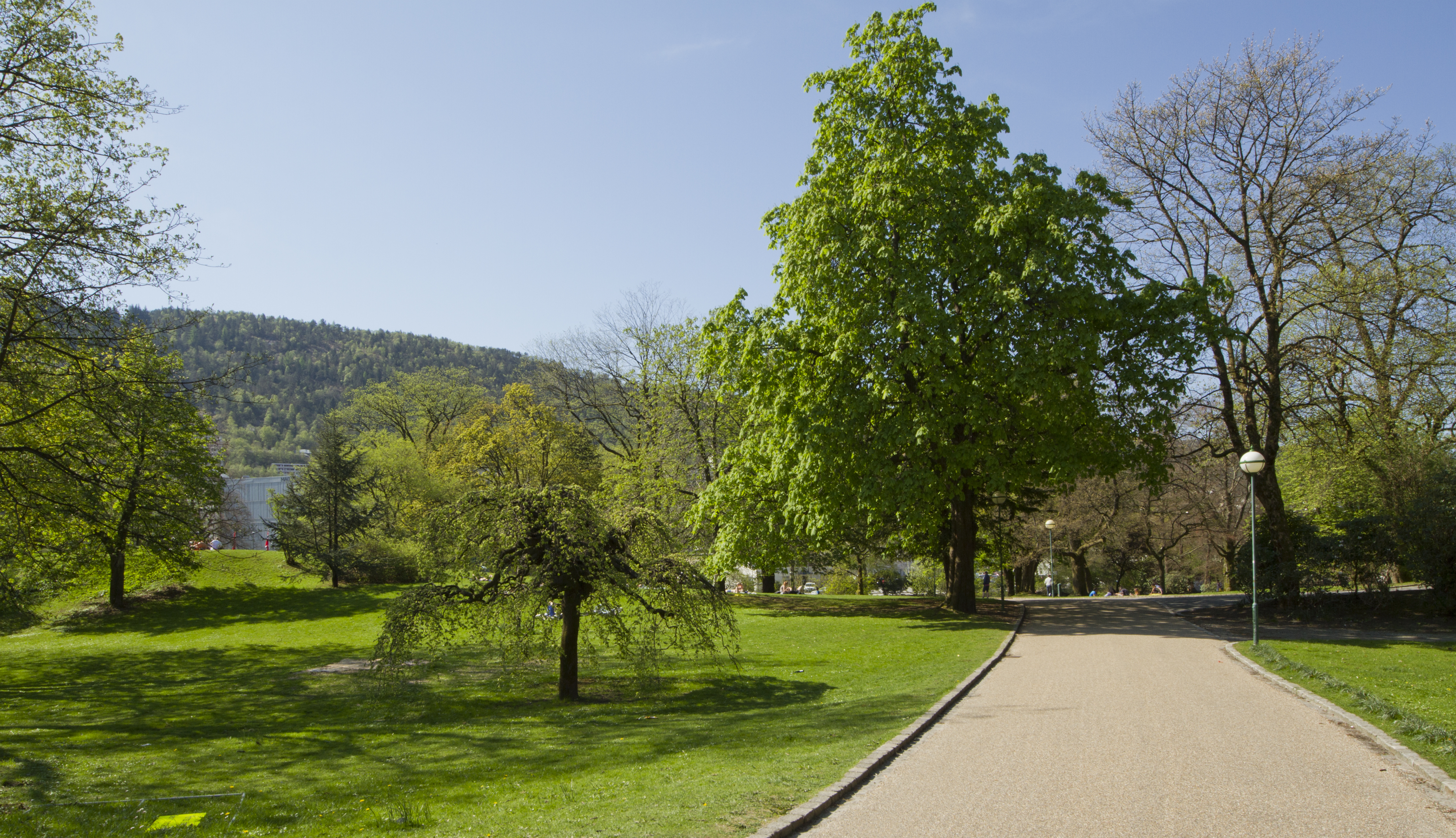
- Interactive map of Nygårdsparken
- Location: Bergen, Norway
- Coordinates: 60°22′58.447″N 5°19′45.527″E
- Area: 74.2 decares (18.3 acres)
- Opened: 1880
- Status: Open year round

Nygårdsparken is a public park located in the city centre of Bergen in Vestland county, Norway. It is located between the neighbourhoods of Nygård and Møhlenpris. Covering 74.2 decares (18.3 acres), Nygårdsparken is the largest urban park in Bergen.

== History ==
Nygårdsparken was conceived by the physicians Joachim Georg Wiesener and Klaus Hanssen, who founded the Park Association of Nygaard (Nygaards Parkselskab) in 1880. Modeled on the typical English park, it was laid out by the Danish gardener S. Lund Leiberg.

In 1898, the "Bergen exhibition" changed the park into an exhibition area. With a ticket costing 50 øre you could visit a small zoo and a botanical garden, study objects from Nansen's polar expeditions, and take the elevator to the top of Wisbech & Meinich's "Panorama tower with electric elevator". A lift attendant in uniform was in charge of what was most likely the first elevator in Bergen. Norway's first elevator was namely produced in the same year, in Wisbech's factory in Christiania.

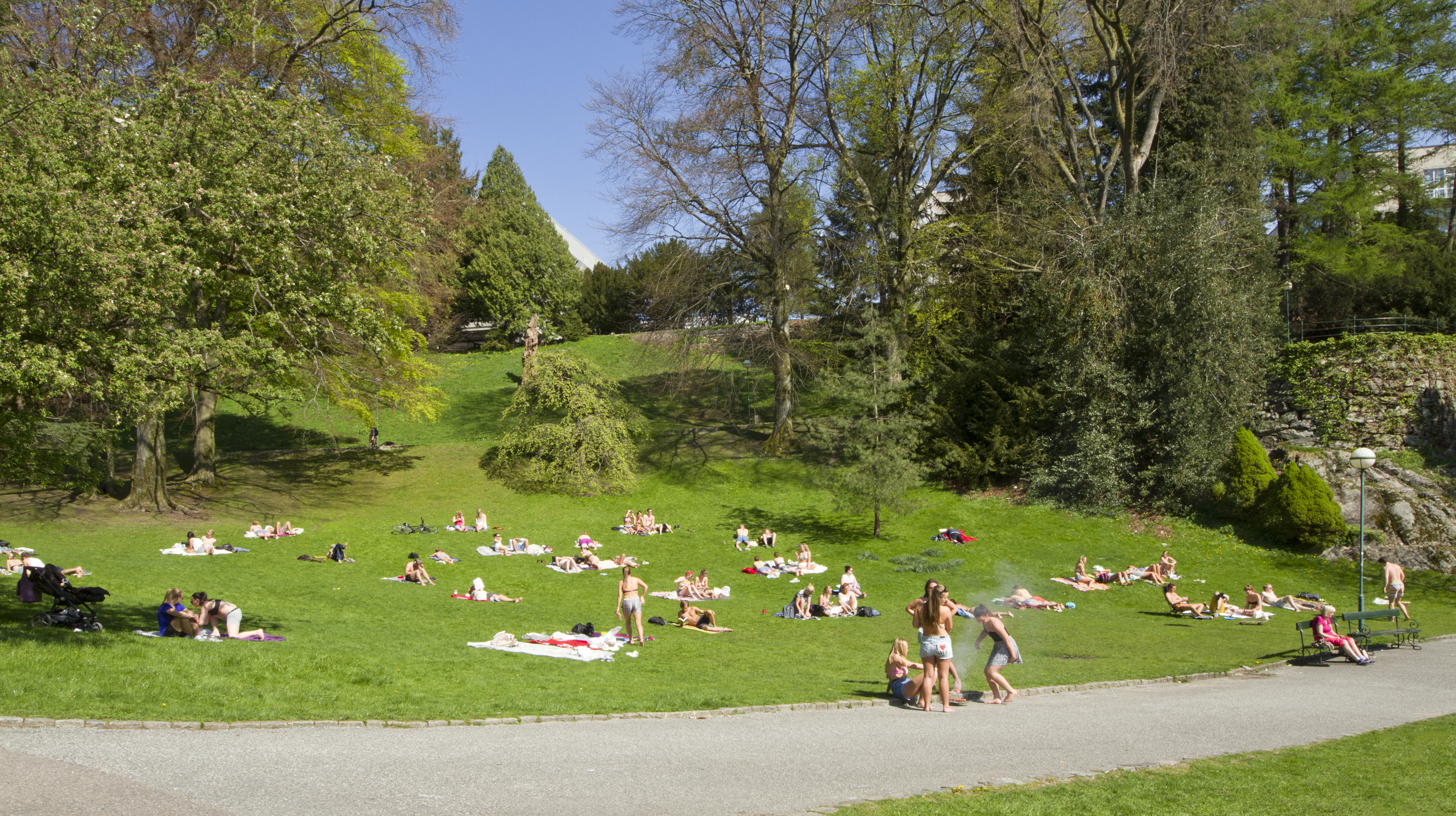
Summer in Nygårdsparken

Following the uncontrolled expansion of the city in the last half of the 20th century, the population in the city centre fell dramatically. While Nygårdsparken had earlier been within short walking distance of 30,000 to 40,000 people, this was no longer the case. As a result, the interest in the park fell, leading to a lack of maintenance. Eventually, drug addicts, lacking better places to stay, began using the park for their purposes. Nygårdsparken evolved into the main drug area in Bergen, with sale of heroin, cannabis and other drugs taking place all day and night. The police have been criticised both for not paying attention to the amount of drug abuse taking place in the park, and for not taking action against drug dealers or the drug addicts themselves.

As part of a plan to increase the kindergarten capacity in Bergen, the municipality decided that in 2007 to build seven temporary kindergartens in Bergen, including one in Nygårdsparken, with a total capacity of 550 children.

In August 2014, the northern part of Nygårdsparken was closed. After extensive rehabilitation of roads and vegetation as well as the construction of a pavilion with a cafe, the first construction stage at the new Nygårdsparken was reopened on 9 September 2017. The drug scene moved to other parts of the city.
