= Fabio Wibmer =

Austrian cyclist (born 1995)

Personal information
- Nicknames: Whipmer; Flipmer
- Born: 30 June 1995 (age 31) Oberpeischlach, Kals am Großglockner, Austria
- Height: 1.90 m (6 ft 3 in)
- Weight: 78 kg (172 lb)

Cycling career
- Sport: Cycling
- Current team: Red Bull, Canyon Sick!
- Disciplines: Street trials Mountain biking
- Role: Rider

Fabio Wibmer (born 30 June 1995) is an Austrian cyclist and YouTuber who mainly practices street trials, as well as downhill mountain biking. He is best known for his online street trials videos, which are comparable to those by Danny MacAskill. He is sponsored by energy drink company Red Bull. He won the national downhill mountain biking championships in 2016. He is also the co-founder of the bicycle marketplace Bikeflip, launched in Innsbruck in 2021 together with Andrea Maranelli and Nikolai Holder.

Wibmer runs the "Sick! Series" brand of clothing, which creates cycling gear and accessories, among other items. He also performs live shows showcasing street trials as part of the "Drop and Roll" team founded by Danny MacAskill, along with Duncan Shaw, Ali Clarkson, and John Langlois.

As of December 2023, Wibmer's YouTube channel, which was created in 2008, has over 7.7 million subscribers and 1.5 billion views. His most viewed upload is 2019's "Wibmer's Law", with 258 million views, followed by "Urban Freeride lives", with 257 million views.

== Videos (Selection) ==
Date	Title	Location	Notes
February 2014	Paris Is My Playground	Paris	
December 2014	Osttirol Is My Playground	East Tyrol	Filmed by Hannes Berger; Music by The Family Crest (The Headwinds & Love Don't Go) and Early Morning Rebel (Hold On)
December 2015	Fabiolous Escape	East Tyrol	Filmed by Hannes Berger
November 2016	Out Of Mind	Saalbach-Hinterglemm, Leogang	Filmed by Manuel Nguyen
November 2016	Riding a bike on a 200 m high rail	Kölnbreinsperre, Maltakraftwerke	Entry for the GoPro Of The World Contest
April 2017	Urban Freeride Lives	Salzburg	Filmed by Hannes Berger
July 2017	Urban Freeride Lives in Vienna	Vienna	Filmed by Manuel Nguyen; Music by The Phantoms (Take The World & Can't Get Enough)
September 2017	Riding down the Dolomites	Dolomites	Filmed by Stephan Senfter; Music by Here and Now (Energy)
April 2018	Fabiolous Escape 2	Saalbach-Hinterglemm	Filmed by Alex Meliss; Music by Audionetwork.com
September 2019	Wibmer’s Law – Fabio Wibmer	Austria	Music by Sounds of Red Bull (Come Alive)
December 2019	Urban Freeride Lives 3	Lyon & Paris	Filmed by Manuel Nguyen & Hannes Berger; Music by Oh The Larceny (Blood Is Rebel)
January 2020	Israel Is My Playground – Fabio Wibmer	Israel	Filmed by Aleksander Osmalek, Lukas Faltenbacher, Ohad Nir and Hannes Berger
May 2020	Home Office – Fabio Wibmer	Austria	Produced by Sick Cinema
November 2022	GTB Video Game	France	Produced by Sick Cinema
July 2023	Urban Freeride lives Chile	Chile	Produced by Sick Cinema
January 2024	The Streif	Austria, Streif	Produced by Sick Cinema
