= Eastroc Beverage =

Chinese beverage company

Eastroc Beverage (Group) Co. Ltd.
- Trade name: Eastroc
- Native name: 东鹏饮料（集团）股份有限公司
- Formerly: Shenzhen Eastroc Beverage Industry Co., Ltd.
- Type: Public
- Traded as: SSE: 605499; SEHK: 9980
- Industry: Beverage
- Founded: 1987; 39 years ago
- Headquarters: Shenzhen, Guangdong, China
- Key people: Lin Muqin (Chairman)
- Products: Eastroc Super Drink
- Revenue: ▲CN¥15.83 billion (2024)
- Net income: ▲CN¥3.33 billion (2024)
- Total assets: ▲CN¥22.68 billion (2024)
- Total equity: ▲CN¥7.69 billion (2024)
- Website: www.szeastroc.com

Eastroc Beverage (Group) Co. Ltd. (Eastroc; Chinese: 东鹏饮料; pinyin: Dōngpéng Yǐnliào) is a Chinese beverage company that focuses on energy drinks, beverage products and sports beverages.

== Background ==
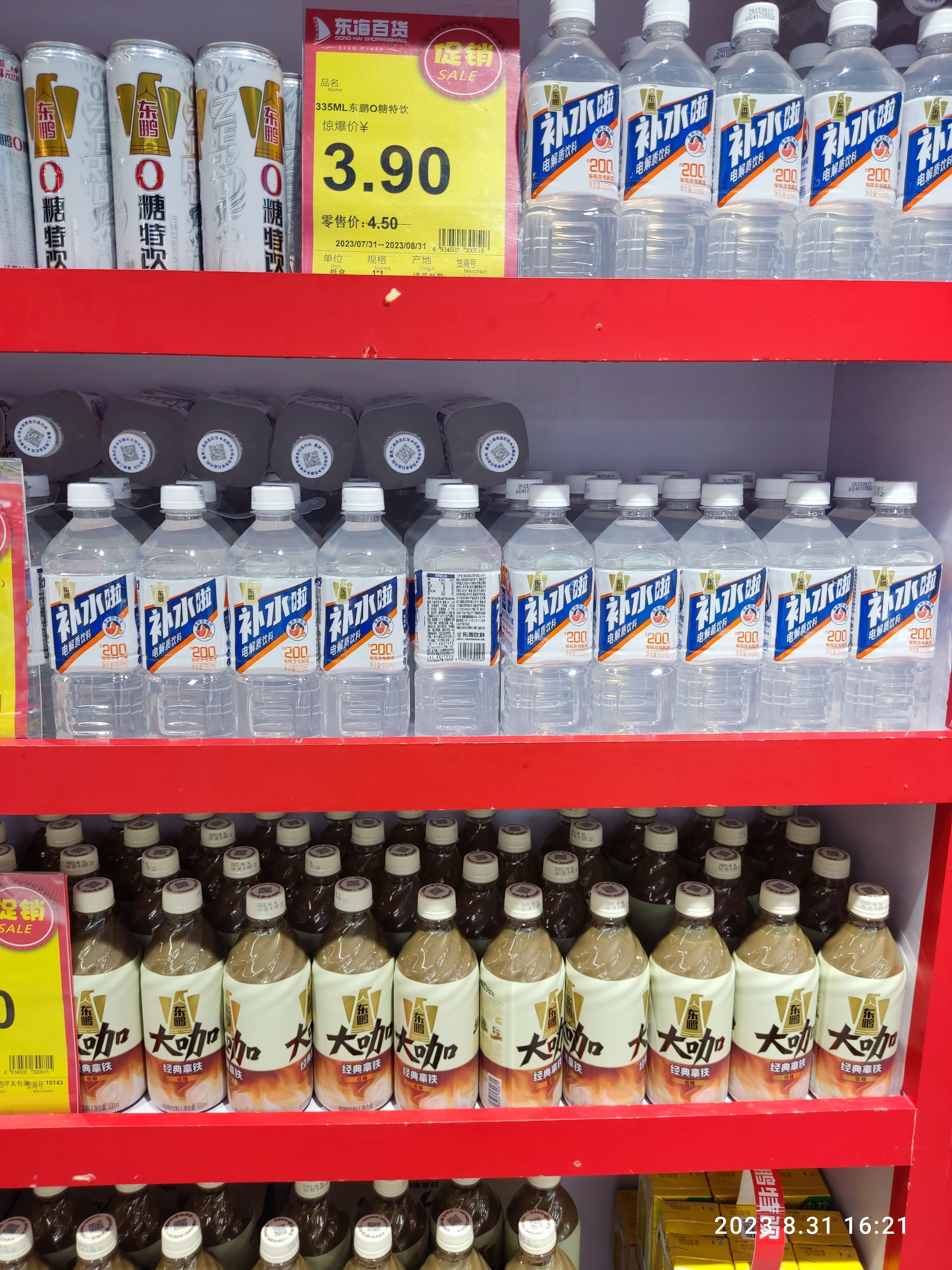
Eastroc products in a supermarket

Eastroc was founded in 1987 and was established in 1994 as a state-owned company/ making. Eastroc focused on herbal tea beverages but due to the dominance of Wong Lo Kat, it did not perform strongly and came close to bankruptcy at one point.

In 2003, Eastroc general sales manager Lin Muqin acquired the company and restructured it as a limited company.

Lin changed the company's direction to focus on energy drinks after seeing the growth of Red Bull. The move attracted controversy where it was accused of plagiarising Red Bull. However Eastroc succeeded by making products cheaper to target the lower end of the market rather than competing with Red Bull directly in the high end market. Eastroc also used online marketing and entertainment channels to advertise its products. Eastroc's breakthrough came in 2016 when Krating Daeng and Reignwood Group engaged in a legal battle over Red Bull licensing. This gave Eastroc the opportunity to expand in China's energy drink market. By the time the lawsuit ended in 2021 Eastroc had already overtaken Red Bull in China sales.

In 2021, Eastroc held its initial public offering on the Shanghai Stock Exchange to become a listed company.

In 2022, Eastroc planned to list global depositary receipts on the SIX Swiss Exchange. However these plans did not materialise and in December 2024, it was reported Eastroc was looking at listing in Hong Kong.

In February 2026, Eastroc held a secondary listing on the Hong Kong Stock Exchange.
