= Yoovidhya =

Yoovidhya is a Thai surname. Notable people with the surname include:

- Chaleo Yoovidhya (1923–2012), Thai businessman and investor
- Chalerm Yoovidhya (born 1950), Thai businessman, son of Chaleo
- Vorayuth Yoovidhya (born c. 1985), grandson of Chaleo, involved in the death of Wichian Klanprasert
