= Chanchai Ruayrungruang =

Chinese-Thai Billionaire

- Born: Yan Bin; 1954 (age 70–71); Shandong, China
- Occupation: Businessman
- Title: CEO, Reignwood Group

Chanchai Ruayrungruang (born 1954), also known as Yan Bin, is a Chinese-Thai billionaire businessman and CEO of the privately held Reignwood Group.

Ruayrungruang was born in the Chinese province of Shandong. He emigrated to Thailand in the 1980s, where he founded the Reignwood Group before moving the company back to China in 1990. Ruayrungruang lives in Beijing, China.

In the mid 1990s, he acquired the rights to manufacture and distribute Red Bull in China through a joint venture with members of the Yoovidhya family.
