= Corruption in Thailand =

Corruption in Thailand is a national issue. Thai law provides criminal penalties for conviction of official corruption. Thailand's 2014 military junta, the National Council for Peace and Order (NCPO), stated that fighting corruption would be one of its main focus points, a common practice for military dictatorships following Thailand's frequent military coups. Despite the promises, officials engaged in corrupt practices with impunity, and the NCPO engaged in corrupt practices itself.

Transparency International's 2025 Corruption Perceptions Index, which scored 182 countries on a scale from 0 ("highly corrupt") to 100 ("very clean"), gave Thailand a score of 33. When ranked by score, Thailand ranked 116th among the 182 countries in the Index, where the country ranked first is perceived to have the most honest public sector. For comparison with regional scores, the best score among those countries of the Asia Pacific region that appeared in the Index (Note: Afghanistan, Australia, Bangladesh, Bhutan, Brunei Darussalam, Cambodia, China, Fiji, Hong Kong, India, Indonesia, Japan, North Korea, South Korea, Laos, Malaysia, Maldives, Mongolia, Myanmar, Nepal, New Zealand, Pakistan, Papua New Guinea, Philippines, Singapore, Solomon Islands, Sri Lanka, Taiwan, Thailand, Timor-Leste, Vanuatu, and Vietnam) was 84, the average score was 45 and the worst score was 15. For comparison with worldwide scores, the best score was 89 (ranked 1), the average score was 42, and the worst score was 9 (ranked 181, in a two-way tie).

"Even though Thailand has the legal framework and a range of institutions to effectively counter corruption, all levels of Thai society continue to suffer from endemic corruption."

In the 2022 edition of its Best Countries rankings, U.S. News & World Report evaluated global perceptions of 85 developed countries based on 73 country attributes. On the country attribute "Not Corrupt", countries were scored on a scale from 1 to 100 and then ranked by score. Thailand, with a Not Corrupt score of 64.3, was ranked #35 in the list of least corrupt countries, where the #1 country (Sweden, with a score of 100) was perceived to be the least corrupt of all. Among the 16 Asian countries evaluated, (Note: Cambodia, China, India, Indonesia, Japan, Kazakhstan, Malaysia, Myanmar, Philippines, Russia, Singapore, South Korea, Sri Lanka, Thailand, Uzbekistan, and Vietnam) Thailand was ranked #4, where the Asian country with the best Not Corrupt score, Japan, received a 99.9.

== Dynamics ==
The intersection of business and government has resulted in the widespread use of bribes in most sectors across the country. Bribery and conflict of interest are common within Thailand's private and public sectors. Money politics in Thailand, the "flow of money within the political scene", stems from the high number of interconnects between the business and political sectors. Despite anti-corruption laws, the government bureaucracy is ineffective in enforcing them.

In a survey conducted by the University of the Thai Chamber of Commerce among businessmen who deal with bureaucrats who determine contract awards, 25 percent plus is the average for under-the-table fees paid in order to secure a contract from government agencies. The survey showed that 78 percent of the businessmen polled admitted that they had to pay "fees", which they said appeared to have been increasing in recent years. Some businessmen claimed that the rate charged by the greedier gatekeepers for contracts runs as high as 40 percent.

Police corruption is widespread. There were numerous cases in 2016 of police charged with abduction, sexual harassment, theft, and malfeasance. Authorities arrested police officers and convicted them of corruption, drug trafficking, smuggling, and intellectual property rights violations.

So ubiquitous is corruption in Thailand that in 2015 the Thai group, Anti-Corruption Organization of Thailand (ACT), created a "Museum of Thai Corruption" at the Bangkok Art and Culture Centre. According to Mr Mana Nimitmongkol of ACT, "Thailand is a country with a culture of patronage...many generations have seen corruption and got used to it,...We wanted to create the museum in order to tell the cheaters that the things they have done are evil—they will be recorded in the history of Thailand, and Thai people will never forget, nor forgive them." Some critics charge that the museum does not go far enough. The 10 featured "...notorious acts of graft involve government. None touch the military or business."

Global Corruption Barometer 2020 reported that 24% of the respondents paid a bribe for public services, 27% used personal connections for public services, and 28% were offered a bribe for their votes in the past 12 months.

=== Cost to society ===
Sungsidh Piriyarangsan, Dean of the College of Social Innovation at Rangsit University, known for his corruption research, calculates that corruption will rob Thai society of between 50–100 billion baht in 2018. His estimate—described by him as "cautious"— draws from 14 corruption studies funded by the Public Sector Anti-Corruption Commission (PACC). In September 2019, a representative of the United Nations Development Programme observed that the Thai state could have lost 100 billion baht to corruption related to public procurement.

== 2014 military junta's war on corruption ==
On 2 June 2014, Prime Minister Prayut Chan-o-cha declared "war on corruption" after seizing power in the 2014 coup d'état and setting up a military junta, the National Council for Peace and Order (NCPO) to govern Thailand. Prayut has made the issue one of the focus areas of his premiership. The first time he spoke on his weekly TV program "Returning Happiness to the People" in August 2014, he described corruption as "deeply rooted in Thai society,..." and made promises to fight it.

However, the NCPO has engaged in high-profile corruption practices itself, including a nepotism scandal involving Prayut's brother and a questionable submarine deal with China that was widely criticized. Many critics argued that the junta's vague "tough on corruption" stance was abused to get rid of those seen as a threat to the ruling junta.

=== Thai anti-corruption agencies ===
Thailand has no lack of governmental agencies charged with combating corruption. It has seven: the Election Commission; the Office of the Auditor-General of Thailand; the Public Sector Anti-Corruption Commission; the National Anti-Corruption Commission (NACC); the Royal Thai Police (RTP); the Department of Special Investigation; and the Office of the Attorney-General. Prayut has said he would like to see more integration and cooperation among the agencies.

The junta has often spoken of the need to clean up corruption, not only among the nation's politicians, but society at large. While there have been a handful of high-profile arrests of those accused of corruption or human trafficking, officials have focused largely on small-scale public-order issues, such as banning sunbed rentals on public beaches or clearing vendors from some Bangkok sidewalks.

The Office of the Public Sector's Anti-Corruption Commission (PACC) announced plans in November 2015 to publish a handbook on corruption investigation procedures in a bid to shorten the investigation process. Director of PACC Sector 4 Police Lieutenant Colonel Wannop Somjintanakul, announced that Mahidol University, Rangsit University and other anti-corruption agencies are co-authoring the handbook. Mr. Sanyapong Limprasert, a law professor from Rangsit University, said the handbook is expected to set the same standards for all corruption cases and reduce the time involved in investigations. It is also intended to serve as a guideline for the authorities whenever they consider taking legal action against any individual suspected of corruption. The handbook was scheduled to be published in May 2016.

=== 2016 crackdown on corruption ===
In December 2015 the Thai government announced a crackdown on "...corrupt 'people of influence'". At the behest of Prime Minister Prayut, the police, intelligence agencies, and the Interior Ministry have compiled a list of persons to be targeted. Deputy Prime Minister Prawit Wongsuwan says the names will be "verified" and in February–March 2016 the crackdown will commence.

=== Criticism of the junta ===
Prayut has taken credit for stamping out corruption and blames the poor economy on his handling of corruption in Thailand: "Today the economy is slowing down because previously everybody had money to spend," Prayut said on 5 June 2015 in a nationally televised speech. "But now we have a problem,... It's because some people spend money from illegal businesses and money from fraud. Now the government has come to set things right, causing that money to disappear."

Many critics asserted that the junta's rhetoric on corruption was little more than an excuse to hold on to power. "What the army has done...is ramp up on anti-corruption rhetoric, and part of that is to explain away why the economy has been performing below potential...There is little evidence on the policy front that the army government has made much progress in making state enterprises or the civil service more accountable to the public," said Ambika Ahuja, a London-based analyst at Eurasia Group, a political-risk adviser. Blaming corruption is standard practice for Thailand's military takeovers, Ambika said. "Every army government uses it as one of the reasons, if not the main reason, for launching a coup. It justifies a takeover." Ahuja's views were borne out in November 2015, when a media storm erupted over alleged corruption in the Rajabhakti Park project in Hua Hin.

Critics also argued that the junta's stance on corruption was used to get rid of political dissent. The most notable case was an alleged corruption charge for the mishandling of a rice subsidy policy brought up against former Prime Minister Yingluck Shinawatra, whose democratically elected government was overthrown by the Junta in 2014. Other members of Yingluck's government were also charged with corruption for the rice policy, with two of Yingluck's ministers receiving a staggering 42 and 36-year prison sentence for the corruption charges respectively. The legitimacy of the charges has been questioned since their inception, critics pointed to the unusually severe sentences as an indication they were politically motivated.

In January 2017, Thailand's University of the Thai Chamber of Commerce's (UTCC) "Corruption Situation Index" (CSI) claimed that national corruption was on the decline, reaching the lowest level in six years. The UTCC claimed that corruption began to ease in the latter half of 2014 after the military seized power and set up a junta-controlled government. Since then, the UTCC stated that annual losses attributed to corruption have averaged 120 billion baht, down from about 300–400 billion baht in previous years.

However, the international corruption index from Transparency International showed no change in their corruption index for Thailand between 2014 and 2015, and that corruption actually worsened from 2015 to 2016. Other corruption agencies also noted a decline in transparency since the 2014 coup d'état, especially in the judicial system and in civil society where the media is restricted and influenced by the military government and criticism of the current regime is heavily suppressed.

At a more grassroots level, citizens disgruntled with the seemingly entrenched nature of Thai corruption have pursued other means of expressing their displeasure with the corrupt status quo, including the use of graffiti.

== Notable cases ==
=== Rolls-Royce and Thai Airways ===
In January 2017 a four-year investigation by the UK's Serious Fraud Office (SFO) came to light. It determined that aircraft engine maker Rolls-Royce had paid bribes to "...agents of the Thai state and employees of Thai Airways..." in order to secure orders for the Rolls-Royce T800 engine for its Boeing 777-200s. Rolls-Royce admitted to the charge and agreed to pay penalties. The illicit payments of US$36.38 million took place between 1991 and 2005. Bribes were paid in three tranches:

1. 1 June 1991 – 30 June 1992: Rolls-Royce paid 660 million baht (US$18.8 million)
2. 1 March 1992 – 31 March 1997: Rolls-Royce paid US$10.38 million
3. 1 April 2004 – 28 February 2005: Rolls-Royce paid US$7.2 million

The government rejected calls for Prime Minister Prayut Chan-o-cha to use his Section 44 powers to cut through red tape in the investigation of the Rolls-Royce bribery scandal. Response from the Thai government's National Anti-Corruption Commission to information provided by the SFO, is said to be "tepid" and "...could be more embarrassing than the scandal itself." Auditor-General Pisit Leelavachiropas said his agency suspected that between 20 and 30 people were involved. "It's likely they accepted bribes," he said.

In an action by the US Department of Justice (DOJ) against aircraft engine-maker Rolls-Royce, the DOJ claimed that Rolls-Royce had paid more than US$11 million in commissions to win a deal with Thai Airways, aware that some of the funds would be used to bribe officials at PTT and its subsidiary, PTT Exploration and Production (PTTEP). The payments were made from 2003-2013 and related to contracts for equipment and after-market products and services. PTT vowed to investigate. Admitting its guilt, Rolls-Royce paid US$170 million to settle the case. Subsequently, PTT Chairman and CEO Tevin Vongvanich said that the company was unable to find anyone who "allegedly took bribes".

=== Vorayudh Yoovidhya, Red Bull heir ===
In 2012, Vorayudh Yoovidhya, a grandson of Red Bull co-founder Chaleo Yoovidhya, was driving a Ferrari in the early morning of 3 September when he hit and killed Police Senior Sgt Maj Wichean Glanprasert, the patrol unit chief of the police station in the Thong Lo area of Bangkok. Vorayudh's car hit the officer and dragged his body some distance. Vorayudh fled the scene, returning home. He subsequently attempted to have an employee at his home take the blame for the crime. Vorayudh was charged with reckless driving causing death, failing to help a crash victim, and speeding. Vorayudh then disappeared. Police failed to indict him for speeding and its statute of limitations expired in 2013. The reckless driving charge expired in September 2017. Vorayudh has been repeatedly summoned to meet authorities. He has avoided each meeting, his lawyer claiming that he was sick or out of the country on business. Police have failed to capture him and claim to have no clue as to his whereabouts. Bangkok's press maintains that the cases of "Bangkok's deadly rich kids" are handled differently from most deadly car crashes, in which common Thais are arrested, prosecuted, and jailed. Vorayudh failed to show up for his latest, 30 March 2017, summons. A spokesman for the Office of the Attorney-General said the defendant was in Britain on personal business and had asked for another postponement. The spokesman declared that Vorayudh's five-year refusal to appear was acceptable because he had filed a complaint of unfair treatment. He went on to say that the fact that Vorayuth was from one of Thailand's richest families was not a factor in his excused absence.

=== Sanit Mahathavorn, Bangkok police chief ===
When the National Anti-Corruption Commission (NACC) revealed the asset declarations of new NLA members, it was disclosed that Bangkok police chief Police Lieutenant General Sanit Mahathavorn had received monthly payments of 50,000 baht since 2015 from alcohol conglomerate Thai Beverage PLC as an adviser to the firm. Sanit also serves as a member of the city's alcohol control committee, raising conflict of interest issues. Calls for him to step down from his police post were immediate. In January 2017 a Royal Thai Police investigation confirmed that Sanit is not violating police rules by holding an advisory role with a major alcohol conglomerate. On 1 March 2017, more than two months after the original allegations were made, both Sanit and ThaiBev denied that he was ever employed by ThaiBev and that the report was due to clerical error. Just two weeks after Sanit's denial that he was on ThaiBev's payroll, Thailand's Office of the Ombudsman said that it had obtained his original financial disclosure document and found it certified with his signature. It now appears that there were two versions of Sanit's financial disclosure form, one listing ThaiBev payments and one with no mention of ThaiBev. Unexplained is how the ThaiBev salary did not appear on the version of Sanit's financial disclosure statement posted online by the NACC. In mid-March, the Office of the Ombudsman, which had accepted a petition to investigate the case, announced that there was not enough evidence for it to consider and the matter was closed.

=== Theft of funds for the poor ===
- A 2017 governmental initiative to distribute funds to poor people, low-income earners, and HIV/AIDS patients in Thailand's 76 provinces was looted by officials in 49 provinces. As of March 2018, 104 million baht allocated to help the poor in those provinces had been misappropriated, amounting to 85 percent of the amount distributed. An investigator from the Public Sector Anti-Corruption Commission stated that fraud came in various forms: there were aid applications with fake documents, applications accompanied by both genuine and fake documents, and aid applications from unqualified applicants. The destitute purported to be recipients either received no money or only partial payment. In some cases, culpable officials told the destitute recipients to lie to investigators, claiming that they had received the full amount due them. The crimes came to light in January. They were exposed by a group of Maha Sarakham University students, one of whom was later castigated by a professor for whistleblowing. They were told to complete forms and forge signatures on receipts for 2,000 villagers involving nearly seven million baht while they were working as interns at the Khon Kaen Protection for the Destitute Centre last year. They were ordered to do so by the departmental chief and some senior officials.
- An illiterate 66-year-old grandmother who cares for her 15-year-old granddaughter with cerebral palsy is entitled to a caregiver's allowance of 9,125 baht per month under the Empowerment of Persons with Disabilities Act 2007. As she was unaware of this, she never collected her allowance. She was invited to join the Network of Parents Club of Children with Disabilities in Kalasin Province. She was to take her granddaughter to the club three times per week in exchange for 1,000 baht per week. The club retained her ATM card and bank books. The president of the club induced her to sign an agreement to receive the 4,000 baht monthly stipend. The club allegedly collected the government disbursement of 9,125 baht, paid the stipend, and pocketed the 5,125 baht monthly difference. Thanida Anu-an, a whistleblower who uncovered the scheme, also helped to uncover several other similar cases.

=== Ghost students ===
Thai schools receive government subsidies for each enrolled student. Those in grades seven to nine are subsidized at 4,800 baht each per year. Students in grades 10 to 12 are worth 6,250 baht each to their schools. This has allegedly led to schools inflating their enrollments with "ghost" students. One school was reported to have 196 ghost students. It is unclear in this case where the ghost student subsidies of 940,000 to 1,225,000 baht ended up. Directors may be motivated by the possibility of transfer to a bigger school: when a school is in the range of 500-1,499 students, the school director is permitted to transfer to a larger school, albeit at no increase in salary. Police suspect that postings to larger schools are attractive as they widen the scope for "tea money" kickbacks to directors from parents seeking to place their children in the school.

=== Temple renovation scam ===
A former head of the National Office of Buddhism (NOB), Panom Sornsilp, was sentenced to 20 years in prison on 27 December 2019 after being found guilty by the Criminal Court of corruption in connection with temple funds. Sentenced with him, on similar charges, was Wasawat Kittithirasith, the former director of the Office of Temple Renovation and Development and Religious Welfare. Two others, who served as brokers, approached temples and offered to help them secure funding from the Office of Buddhism for temple renovation in return for a 75% under-the-table commission. They were sentenced to six years and eight months and one year and eight months. The temple fund scam dates from 2017, when the abbot of Wat Takaela in Phetchaburi Province filed a complaint with the Anti-Corruption Police Command seeking an investigation. His temple was allocated 10 million baht by the NOB for renovation, but he was told to return the bulk of the money to the officials who helped to secure the funding. The scam worked by having unofficial brokers, with connections to NOB officials, tell the abbots that they could arrange funding for renovations, but only on the condition that they return three-quarters of the money to the officials and use what remained for renovation. Several temple abbots joined in the scam and pocketed temple funds without spending any on temple renovation.

=== Futsal fields inaction ===
In August 2019, the National Anti-Corruption Commission (NACC) voted 9–0 to indict three Palang Pracharath Party (PPRP) MPs and 21 accomplices to divert 4.4bn baht from a project to construct futsal fields at schools in 19 northeast provinces. The alleged graft took place in 2012. The NACC was required to forward the case to the Office of the Attorney-General (OAG) within 30 days. The OAG then had 180 days to determine whether to bring the case before the Supreme Court's Criminal Division for Holders of Political Positions. As of 27 May 2020, no action has been taken. In the Thai legal system, one organization investigates, and another prosecutes. The failings of such an arrangement have been pointed out, but not rectified.

=== Human trafficking ===
Manas Kongpan was a Thai convicted human trafficker and military commander. From 2008 to 2015, he led the Thai army's policies towards Rohingya refugees, before being arrested on multiple charges, including ordering refugees to be marooned at sea without any means of survival and extorting ransoms from families of refugees.

=== Major Embezzlement, Scandals, and Corruptions by Phuket Mayors ===
In 2024 it was revealed that in Phuket, Thailand, several mayors are facing charges in a major corruption scandal, including Aroon Solos of Rawai, Panya Samphaorat of Pa Khlok, and Juta Dumlak from Kamala Tambon Administrative Organization. The investigation, led by the National Anti-Corruption Commission (NACC), involves allegations of embezzlement and misuse of public funds. The scandal centers around the misappropriation of funds intended for local development projects, with the mayors accused of diverting these funds for personal gain. The NACC has gathered evidence suggesting widespread corruption among local government officials. Multiple mayors from different districts in Phuket are implicated, highlighting a systemic issue within the local administration. The charges include corruption, malfeasance, and abuse of power. The investigation has been ongoing for several months, with the NACC working to uncover the full extent of the corruption. The case has sparked public outrage and calls for greater transparency and accountability in local governance. The accused mayors are expected to face trial, with potential penalties including imprisonment and fines. The Phuket Provincial Administration is cooperating with the NACC to ensure that all those involved are held accountable. This case is part of a broader effort to combat corruption in Thailand's public sector. The investigation and subsequent charges have already led to increased scrutiny of local government practices in Phuket.

The former Mayor of Kathu Subdistrict Municipality in Phuket, Thailand, has been indicted on corruption charges by the National Anti-Corruption Commission (NACC) Region 8. The allegations involve the premature payment of funds to a road contractor before the completion of the work. This case is part of a broader expose of widespread corruption across southern Thailand, revealed at a press conference in Krabi on September 25, 2024. The NACC has indicted the former mayor and his associates, with total damages exceeding 7 million baht across several southern provinces. Notably, Nakhon Si Thammarat had the highest number of complaints, including a case where the mayor of Krungyan subdistrict and five others allegedly embezzled over 3.4 million baht through 39 cheques. Other significant cases include improper fund disbursement by 10 executives at Chumphon Vocational College, resulting in a loss of over 3.3 million baht, and the misuse of more than 1.2 million baht in overtime payments by Krabi Hospital officers. Several former mayors and officials were implicated in various corrupt practices, such as awarding contracts to friends and skimming housing fees. The NACC is currently handling 734 cases, including 376 preliminary investigations, with complaints spanning public utilities, construction, natural resources, and procurement issues. Nakhon Si Thammarat, Surat Thani, and Phuket are among the provinces with the most significant number of complaints. This corruption scandal follows the dismissal of former Kathu Mayor Chai-anan Suthikul, who was removed last year due to a separate investigation involving a lagoon at the Tin Mine Museum. Additionally, Thailand’s Anti-Money Laundering Office (AMLO) has seized over 5 billion baht in assets this year, targeting fraud, online gambling, and corruption.

== See also ==
- Corruption in the Suvarnabhumi Airport project
- Crime in Thailand
- Network monarchy
- Rajabhakti Park
