= Mateschitz =

Mateschitz (Croatian: Matešić) is an Austrian surname of South Slavic origin. Notable people with the surname include:

- Dietrich Mateschitz (1944–2022), Austrian businessman
- Mark Mateschitz (1992), Austrian entrepreneur
