= Chalerm Yoovidhya =

Thai businessman

- Born: Bangkok, Thailand
- Occupation: Businessman
- Known for: 51% stake in Red Bull GmbH
- Spouse: Daranee Yoovidhya
- Children: 3, including Vorayuth Yoovidhya
- Father: Chaleo Yoovidhya

Chalerm Yoovidhya is a Thai billionaire businessman and co-owner of Red Bull GmbH. As of 2024, Forbes estimates his family's net worth at US$36 billion, making them the wealthiest in Thailand.

== Early life ==
Chalerm Yoovidhya is the eldest son of Chaleo Yoovidhya, the originator of Krating Daeng and co-creator of the Red Bull brands of energy drinks. His brother Saravoot Yoovidhya runs Red Bull in Thailand, and is a main board director of Kasikorn Bank.

== Personal life ==
Chalerm is married to Daranee Yoovidhya, with three children, and lives in Bangkok, Thailand. Their children are Varangkana Yoovidhya Kritakara Yoovidhya, Varit Yoovidhya, and Vorayuth Yoovidhya.

Chalerm and his wife have both been mentioned in connection with the Panama Papers, owning five multi-million-dollar properties in London, via Karnforth Investments which is incorporated in the British Virgin Islands. Their holdings in Red Bull are owned through a complex web of British Virgin Islands companies including Karnforth, Jerrard Company Ltd., and JK Fly. Mossack Fonseca's auditors raised concerns about the arrangements in 2010 and 2013.

== See also ==
- Death of Wichian Klanprasert, a case in which Chalerm's fugitive son Vorayuth was sought by Interpol
