= Eastroc Super Drink =

Chinese energy drink

- Type: Energy drink
- Distributor: Eastroc Beverage
- Origin: China
- Introduced: 1987; 39 years ago
- Ingredients: Caffeine, taurine, sucrose and glucose, B-group vitamins, and alpine spring water
- Website: en.szeastroc.com/product/

Eastroc Super Drink (Chinese: 东鹏特饮/东鹏特饮维生素功能饮料) is an energy drink originating and conceived from China in 1987. Eastroc Super Drink is one of China's best selling local energy drink brands after Hi-Tiger and has the third largest market share in China after Red Bull and Hi-Tiger. Of the top three brands, Eastroc Super Drink experienced the most growth in retail sales from 2011 to 2015 with a 255.5% increase. The brand is the first Chinese brand to introduce functional beverages into its line of products. Eastroc Super Drink has been approved by the National Health and Family Planning Commission of China.

== Ingredients ==
Ingredients for the Eastroc Super Drink includes the following but not limited to water, sugar, food additives for example, citric acid, sodium citrate, flavors, taurine, caffeine, lysine, inositol, malic acid, vitamin PP, vitamin B6, vitamin B12 and yellow lemon. The Eastroc Super Drink also includes 125mg of taurine, 50mg of lysine, 50mg of inositol, 50mg of caffeine, 10mg of vitamin PP, 1mg of vitamin B6 and 3ug of vitamin B12.

== Health effects ==
Energy drinks have been associated with numerous health risks, for instance masking the effects of intoxication when consumed with alcohol and excessive or repeated consumption can lead to psychiatric and cardiac conditions. Eastroc Super Drink is still considered safe for consumption by the National Health and Family Planning Commission of the People's Republic of China.

== Promotion ==
Eastroc Super Drink is a strong advocate on sports as seen through advertisements. The brand is the sponsor for the 2017 International Champions Cup (ICC) China in Guangzhou. The brand also sponsored the Portugal national football team during the 2018 FIFA World Cup. In September 2012, Eastroc Super Drink contracted with Nicholes Tze who is the brand's spokesman. The brand has also sponsored multiple Chinese variety shows. Among those are Amazing Race China and top variety show, Go Fighting!. Eastroc Super Drink sponsored the third season of Go Fighting!.
