= Man-new =

Energy drink brand of Taiwan

- Type: Energy drink
- Manufacturer: Paolyta
- Origin: Taiwan
- Introduced: 1997
- Ingredients: Inositol, Lysine, Nicotinamide, Vitamin B1, B12, Vitamin C, β-Carotene, Citric acid, Tartaric acid, Apple juice, Sugar, Fructose
- Website: Company website

Man-new (Chinese: 蠻牛; pinyin: Mán Níu) is a Taiwanese energy drink which was first distributed in 1997. It is manufactured by Paolyta Co., Inc. and is mainly sold in Taiwan, Hong Kong and Macau. Man-new is marketed to alleviate physical and mental fatigue. The drink became popular due to its successful television advertising campaign. The slogan "Are you tired?" became a widely recognized catchphrase in Taiwan.

== See also ==
- Krating Daeng
- Lipovitan
