= Krating Daeng =

Thai energy drink related to Red Bull

- Type: Energy drink
- Manufacturer: T.C. Pharmaceutical Industries Co. Ltd.
- Origin: Thailand
- Introduced: 1976; 50 years ago
- Color: Yellow
- Related products: Red Bull, Red Bull Simply Cola, Organics by Red Bull, Carabao Energy Drink
- Website: www.tcp.com/en/product/energy-drink/kratingdaeng/

Krating Daeng (Thai: กระทิงแดง, RTGS: krathing daeng, pronounced [krà.tʰīŋ dɛ̄ːŋ]; lit. 'red bull' or 'red gaur') is a Thai non-carbonated energy drink brand created by Chaleo Yoovidhya. The drink is marketed and sold primarily in Southeast and East Asia; its derivative, Red Bull, is available in 165 countries.

Chaleo took the name from the gaur (Thai: กระทิง krathing), a large wild bovine of Southeast Asia. The logo of the drink underlies its branding, with two red gaurs charging at each other backdropped by a sun.

== History ==
Krating Daeng was first devised in 1975. It contains water, cane sugar, caffeine, taurine, inositol and B-vitamins. It was introduced in Thailand in 1976 as a refreshment for rural Thai labourers, in the same year that the similarly-named Red Gaurs paramilitary organization carried out attacks on students. "At first it was not very popular...", says current CEO Saravoot Yoovidhya. "It was quite different from others in the market, and Chaleo focused first on upcountry markets rather than in the cities where other competitors concentrated."

The working class image was boosted by sponsorship of Thai boxing matches, where the logo of two red bulls charging each other was often on display.

Krating Daeng has lost its leadership position in its home market of Thailand to M-150 and is now third in the country's energy drinks market, down to possibly only 7 percent market share in 2014.

=== Relation to Red Bull ===
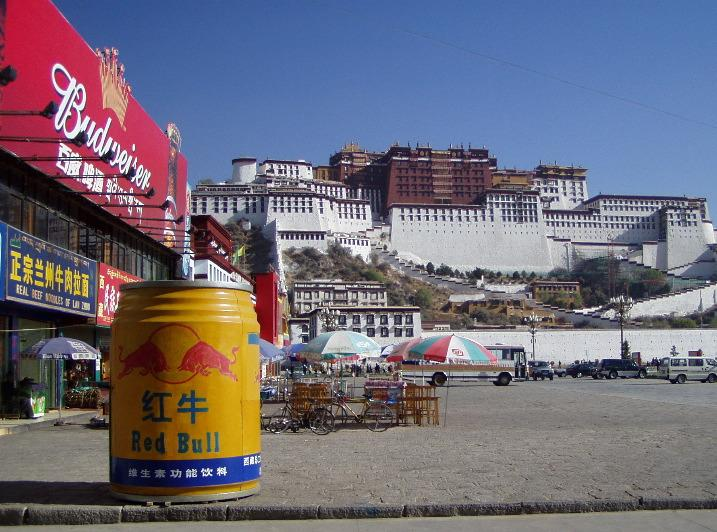
In front of the Potala Palace, Tibet: a Red Bull-branded can of Krating Daeng is displayed (Chinese Reignwood version).

The Thai product is from a different company than the global brand Red Bull as co-founded by Dietrich Mateschitz, an Austrian entrepreneur. Mateschitz was the international marketing director for Blendax, a German toothpaste company, when he visited Thailand in 1982 and discovered that Krating Daeng helped to cure his jet lag. He worked in partnership with Chaleo's T.C. Pharmaceuticals to adapt the formula and composition to Western tastes. Red Bull was launched in 1987.

The two companies are often mistaken for each other, but they are separate entities focusing on different target markets running in conjunction with one another. At the time of founding and as of today, Red Bull GmbH, who owns the trademark for the drink in Europe and the United States of America, is 51 percent controlled by the Yoovidhya family.

Confusingly, the Thai company and its partners do use the name "Red Bull" on some of their products.

- The classic 250 mL can features both "Red Bull" and "KRATINGDAENG" (without space).
- The Thai 170 mL "Extra" and 250 mL "Soda" products feature "Red Bull" and not "Krating Daeng".
- All TCP-licensed products made in China features "Red Bull" and not "Krating Daeng".
- The speciality products for the Malaysian, Filipino, Mongolian, Hong Kongese, Vietnamese, Singaporean markets feature "Red Bull" and not "Krating Daeng".

As a result, the mere presence of the wordmark "Red Bull" does not imply that the product is made by Red Bull GmbH of Austria or one of its subsidiaries.

=== In China ===
Two separate companies use the golden-can Krating Daeng design in China under the wordmark "红牛 Red Bull". This was the result of two separate agreements made by the T.C. Pharmaceutical Industries Co. Ltd. (later the "TCP Group") with Chinese companies. The first company was founded in 1995 a licensed production by Reignwood Group, with the trademark authorization lasting until 2016. The second was founded solely by TCP in 2019, buying up a Chinese drinks company in whole.

Since the end of the license terms in 2016, the TCP and Reignwood have been embroiled in legal fights trying to become the sole legal party allowed to use the trademark 红牛. Different Chinese local courts have made conflicting judgements favoring either side.

== Sponsorship ==
Musician

- (Indonesia) Noah

E-sports

- Kratingdaeng Indonesia E-Sports Championship

Football

- (Indonesia) Persita Tangerang
- (Indonesia) PSIM Yogyakarta

Racing

- (Indonesia) Kratingdaeng Swallow Cleosa Series Championship

Volleyball

- (Indonesia) Kratingdaeng Proliga

== Ingredients ==
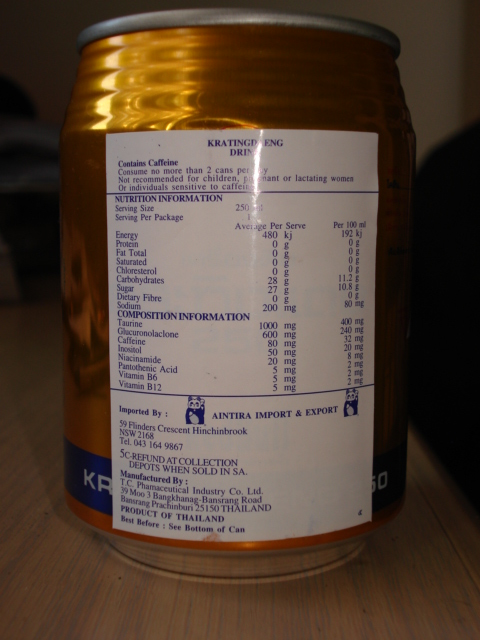
Nutritional info on a 250 mL can of Krating Daeng imported to Australia

By volume, Krating Daeng contains the same amount of caffeine as Red Bull sold in the US. Both contain 32 mg caffeine per 100 mL, or 80 mg caffeine per 250 mL can.

Krating Daeng also contains taurine, glucose, and B vitamins. It is not carbonated.

A 250 mL can of Krating Daeng imported to Australia contains: taurine 1000 mg, glucoronolactone 600 mg, caffeine 80 mg, inositol 50 mg, vitamin B3 20 mg; pantothenic acid 5 mg, vitamin B6 5 mg, vitamin B12 5 mg.

== See also ==
- Kratingdaeng Racing Team
