= Dietrich Mateschitz =

Austrian entrepreneur (1944–2022)

- Mateschitz in 2005
- Born: Dietrich Markwart Eberhart Mateschitz; 20 May 1944; Sankt Marein im Mürztal, Steiermark, German Reich
- Died: 22 October 2022 (aged 78); St. Wolfgang im Salzkammergut, Austria
- Education: Vienna University of Economics and Business
- Occupation: Entrepreneur
- Years active: 1987–2022
- Known for: Co-founding Red Bull GmbH
- Partner: Anita Gerhardter
- Children: Mark Mateschitz

Dietrich Markwart Eberhart Mateschitz (German: [ˈdiːtʁɪç ˈmaːtəʃɪts]; 20 May 1944 – 22 October 2022) was an Austrian entrepreneur. He was the co-founder and 49% owner of Red Bull GmbH. In April 2022, Mateschitz's net worth was estimated at US$27.4 billion.

Mateschitz worked in marketing for Unilever and Blendax. While travelling in Thailand, he discovered the drink Krating Daeng, which he adapted into Red Bull. He founded Red Bull GmbH in 1984 and launched it in Austria in 1987. His company acquired or founded several sports teams around the world, including six-time Constructors' Champions Red Bull Racing and sister team Racing Bulls in Formula One, and association football teams including FC Red Bull Salzburg and RB Leipzig.

== Early life and education ==
Mateschitz was born on 20 May 1944, in Sankt Marein im Mürztal, Styria, Austria, to a family of Slovene-Styrian or Croatian ancestry. His mother's side was from present-day Styria, his father's side was from Maribor (then still part of Styria, but now in Slovenia). He declared himself a "Styrian cosmopolitan". Both his parents were school teachers. He attended the Hochschule für Welthandel (now Vienna University of Economics and Business), where after ten years, he graduated with a marketing degree in 1972. He was keen and passionate about extreme sports at an early age.

== Career ==
Mateschitz's first employer was Unilever, where he worked marketing detergents. He subsequently moved to Blendax, the German cosmetics company (since bought by Procter & Gamble), where he worked on, among other things, the marketing of Blendax toothpaste. It was as part of his travels for Blendax, on the way from Bangkok airport to the city centre, that Mateschitz bought a bottle of Krating Daeng, the drink that would later become Red Bull. "One glass [of Krating Daeng] and the jet lag was gone", he recalled. Sensing the commercial opportunities of this drink in Europe, Mateschitz struck a partnership deal with the Thai businessman Chaleo Yoovidhya, who had already been successfully selling Krating Daeng to lorry drivers and factory workers.

In 1984, he founded Red Bull GmbH with Yoovidhya, launching the brand in Austria in 1987. Subsequently, he turned the Red Bull drink into a world market leader among energy drinks. It was revealed that he worked on the formula for around three years before the modified drink was launched under the new name Red Bull in 1987.

Mateschitz also owned Seitenblicke, Austria's top society magazine, but avoided the celebrity circuit and watched most Formula One races on TV despite owning two teams. He also founded Media House in Austria in 2007 by providing various digital entertainment and thousands of hours of images to interested broadcasters.

Mateschitz owned ServusTV, a television channel based in Salzburg. The channel was criticised for allegedly downplaying the seriousness of the COVID-19 pandemic. The channel is considered to have a right-wing position, and was one of three media outlets given a press pass to the "Defenders of Europe" conference of right-wing and far-right activists in October 2016. In May 2016, Mateschitz announced he would shut down the channel as his employees had requested to form a works council; he changed his mind when no such council was formed.

=== Sports ===
Mateschitz's brands are consistently marketed as associated with the physical and mental attributes needed for various types of extreme sports such as surfing, skydiving, cliff diving, winter sports and mountain biking through commercial sponsorship. Under his tenure, Red Bull was widely acclaimed for its creative and intensive marketing of extreme sports. The successful high altitude skydiving exploration from the edge of space which was carried out by Red Bull Stratos in collaboration with Felix Baumgartner in October 2012 is considered as one of the turning points in Red Bull's history in terms of its intensive marketing strategies in the context of extreme sports.

==== Motorsport ====
Red Bull formerly owned more than 60 percent of the Sauber Formula One motor racing team, and was the team's main sponsor. However, Red Bull ended its relationship with Sauber at the end of 2001 after the team opted to sign Kimi Räikkönen as one of their drivers for the 2001 season instead of Red Bull protege Enrique Bernoldi. In November 2004, Mateschitz bought the failing Jaguar Racing Formula One team from its previous owners, Ford, for $1. Mateschitz renamed Jaguar as Red Bull Racing in the following season in 2005, and recruited former Formula-2 driver Christian Horner as team principal while also bringing one of the sport's leading design engineer Adrian Newey on board as the technical director for a salary of $10m.

In September 2005, Mateschitz joined forces with his close friend and former Formula One driver, Gerhard Berger, to purchase the Italian-registered Minardi team from its Australian owner Paul Stoddart. This team was meant to serve as a junior team to Red Bull Racing and was renamed as Scuderia Toro Rosso (Italian: Red Bull Stable) in 2006, Scuderia AlphaTauri in 2020, and Racing Bulls in 2024.

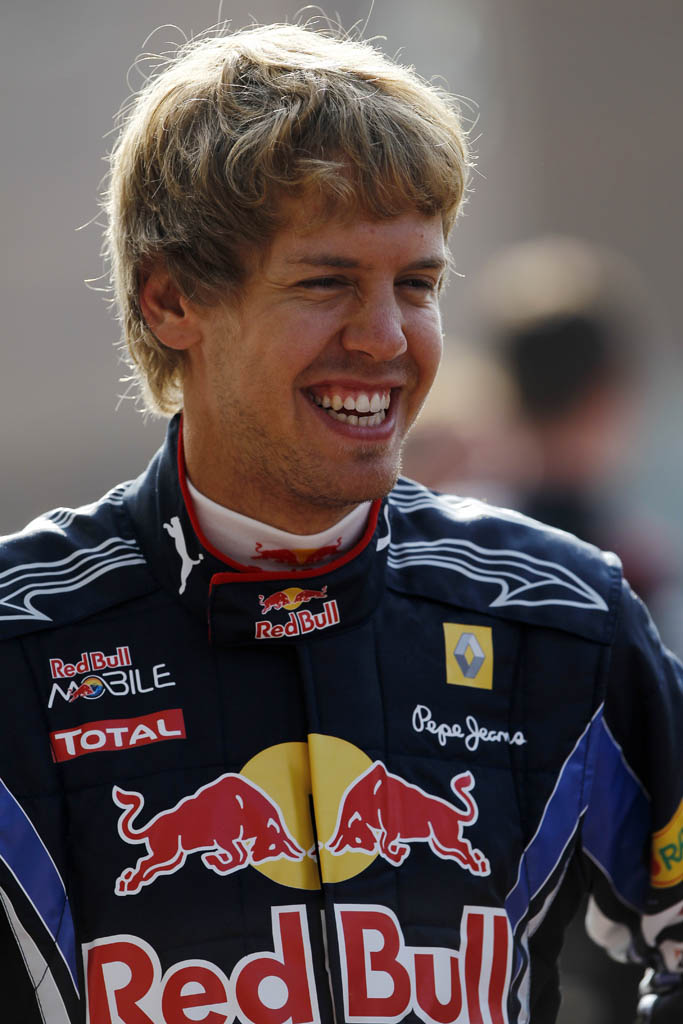
Sebastian Vettel won four consecutive Formula One championships while driving for Red Bull Racing.

Sebastian Vettel won the 2008 Italian Grand Prix for Toro Rosso. His victory at the 2009 Chinese Grand Prix was the first for Red Bull Racing. In 2010, Red Bull Racing won the Formula One World Constructors' Championship and Vettel won the Drivers' Championship. They then went on to win both titles for the next three years running in 2011, 2012, and 2013. Red Bull retained their Renault power amidst the arrival of turbo-hybrid engines in 2014. Mercedes had a much more powerful engine, leading to sustained dominance from 2014 to 2020. Red Bull's unreliable and slow Renault engine led to a rough patch and lean phase; while Red Bull was able to win races, the most notable being Max Verstappen on his Red Bull debut at the 2016 Spanish Grand Prix, the team ultimately went winless in both the Drivers' and Constructors' Championships for over eight years. Red Bull's partnership with Renault broke down after 2015, but the team was unable to find another engine supplier, opting to run Renault engines rebadged as TAG Heuer in 2016 to 2018. Taking Honda power in 2019 proved beneficial for Red Bull, leading up to their first Drivers' Championship victory since Vettel in 2013 with Verstappen in 2021, while finishing runners-up in the Formula One World Constructors' Championship which was won by Mercedes. In the 2022 season, Red Bull's last Formula One season that was overseen by Mateschitz, Verstappen retained his title, the sixth by a Red Bull driver. In the same year, Mateschitz was heavily involved in setting up Red Bull Powertrains (RBPT) following Honda's withdrawal from the sport and will supply power units to Red Bull Racing and Racing Bulls from 2026 onwards. The power units were named in Mateschitz's honour.

From 2006 to 2011, Mateschitz also owned Team Red Bull who competed in the NASCAR Sprint Cup Series and the K&N Pro Series East.

In late 2004, he bought the A1-Ring racing circuit, which had formerly hosted the Formula One Austrian Grand Prix, and renamed it the Red Bull Ring. The circuit re-opened in May 2011 and hosted a round of the 2011 Deutsche Tourenwagen Masters season. Although Mateschitz had stated that there were no plans for it to return to the Formula One calendar, in December 2012 Red Bull notified the Fédération Internationale de l'Automobile they would be open to hosting a Grand Prix. In July 2013, Red Bull announced the return of the Austrian Grand Prix to the Formula One World Championship in 2014. The race took place on 22 June 2014 and was won by Nico Rosberg, driving for Mercedes.

==== Football and ice hockey ====
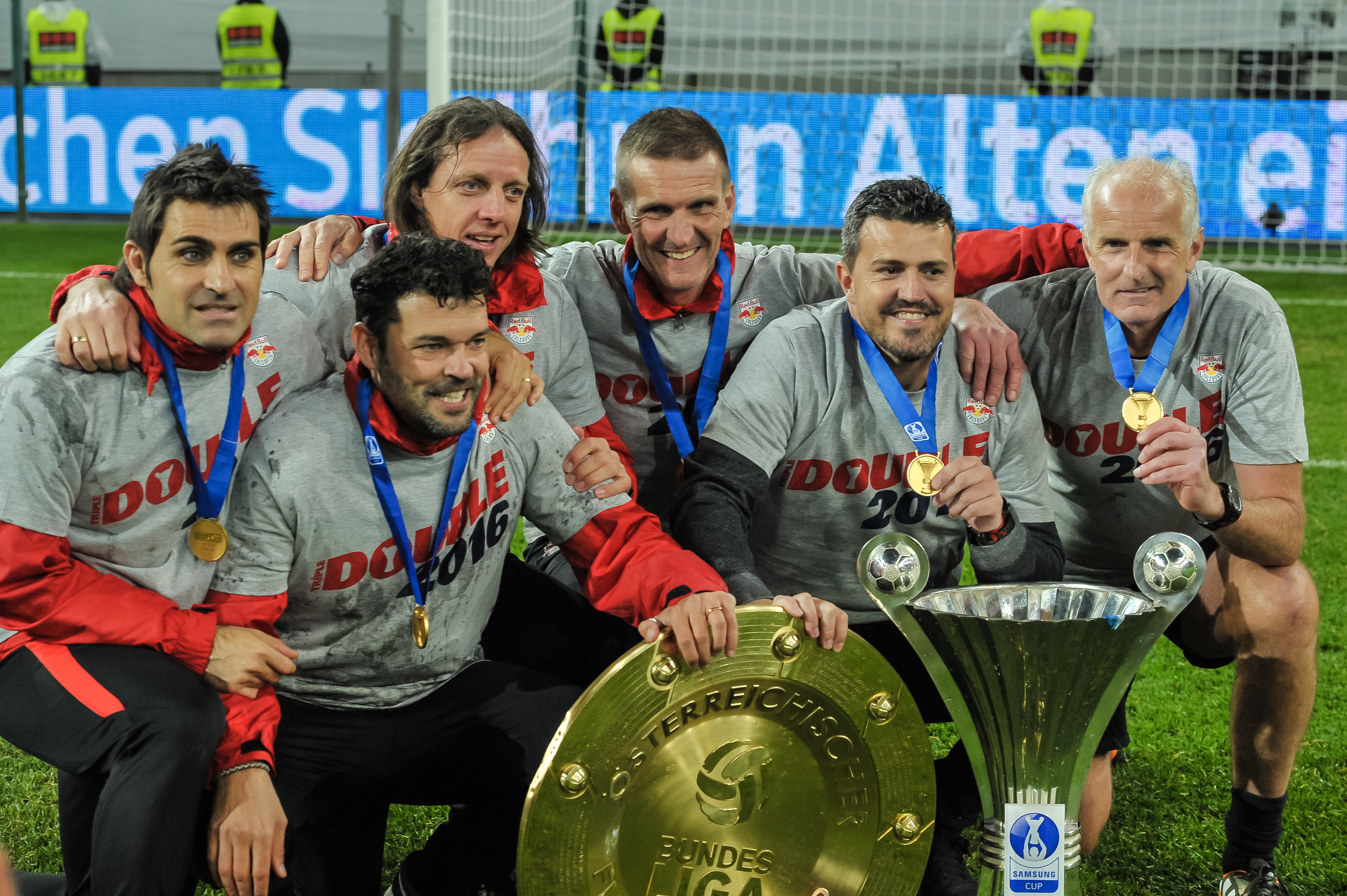
FC Red Bull Salzburg celebrating the Austrian Bundesliga and Austrian Cup titles in 2016

In April 2005 he bought the Austrian football club SV Austria Salzburg, and in March 2006 he bought the American soccer team MetroStars; both clubs were subsequently renamed after his famous drink, as the Red Bull Salzburg and the New York Red Bulls, respectively. In 2007, Red Bull founded Red Bull Brasil, a football team based in Campinas, São Paulo, and in 2019 the company acquired Clube Atlético Bragantino, also in the state of São Paulo. In 2008, Red Bull founded Red Bull Ghana, a football academy in Sogakope which was sold to Dutch club Feyenoord in 2014.

In May 2009, he founded the German football club RB Leipzig, after buying the license from SSV Markranstädt. They debuted in the Oberliga, the fifth tier of the German football league system. The team rose to the top-tier Bundesliga in 2016, made the UEFA Champions League semi-finals in 2020 and won the DFB-Pokal in 2022 and 2023 and the DFL-Supercup in 2023.

He also owned the ice hockey clubs EC Red Bull Salzburg and EHC Red Bull München, which were acquired and rebranded in 2000 and 2012, respectively.

=== Philanthropy ===
Mateschitz was co-founder of the Wings for Life foundation that supports spinal cord research together with Heinz Kinigadner. Since 2014, the foundation has organised the Wings for Life World Run to raise funds.

Mateschitz personally donated 70 million euros to Paracelsus Medical University for a research center on spinal cord injuries.

He also initiated the World Stunt Awards, an annual fundraiser to benefit his Taurus Foundation, which, according to its website, helps injured stunt professionals.

== Personal life and death ==
Mateschitz never married; he had a son named Mark, born in May 1992. As of the time of Mateschitz's death, his son was the managing director of one of his investment companies. Mateschitz rarely gave interviews, and refused to answer questions about his son. He remained a reclusive figure maintaining low profile despite his heavy involvement with Formula One. He was also known for his simplicity of dress, often being seen wearing casual clothing, including denim pants and sunglasses. Mateschitz was in a relationship with the mother of his son, Anita Gerhardter, for nine years, and later had a long-term partner named Marion Feichtner. He was known as a recluse, stating "I don't believe in 50 friends. I believe in a smaller number. Nor do I care about society events. It's the most senseless use of time. When I do go out, from time to time, it's just to convince myself again that I'm not missing a lot".

One of Mateschitz's favourite songs was the 1981 song "Start Me Up" by The Rolling Stones, according to former Red Bull Racing CEO and Team Principal Christian Horner and was played in the Red Bull garage after every race win involving the team.

He held a pilot's licence and enjoyed flying a Falcon 900 and a Piper Super Cub. He had his own hangar with a collection of old planes, including the last Douglas DC-6B ever produced, which once belonged to Yugoslav Marshal Josip Broz Tito.

Mateschitz and his Bundesliga club RB Leipzig faced backlash in 2017 over comments he made in a Kleine Zeitung interview in which he suggested that Austria should close its borders to refugees and expressed his support for Donald Trump and other populist positions. He went on to strongly criticize both the Government of Germany and the Government of Austria for their policies during the 2015 European migrant crisis.

Mateschitz lived in Fuschl am See, Austria and also owned the island of Laucala in Fiji, which he bought from the Forbes family for £7 million. He spent millions to acquire and conserve houses and castles in the Austrian Alps, saying "I want to enjoy these places myself, but I also want to take care of them".

Mateschitz once said that he drank 10 to 12 cans of Red Bull every day. Mateschitz died following a long period of treatment for pancreatic cancer, at his home in St. Wolfgang im Salzkammergut on 22 October 2022, at age 78.

== See also ==
- The World's Billionaires
