= Ingelheimer Aue =

Coordinates: 50°1′31.89171″N 8°14′32.97363″E

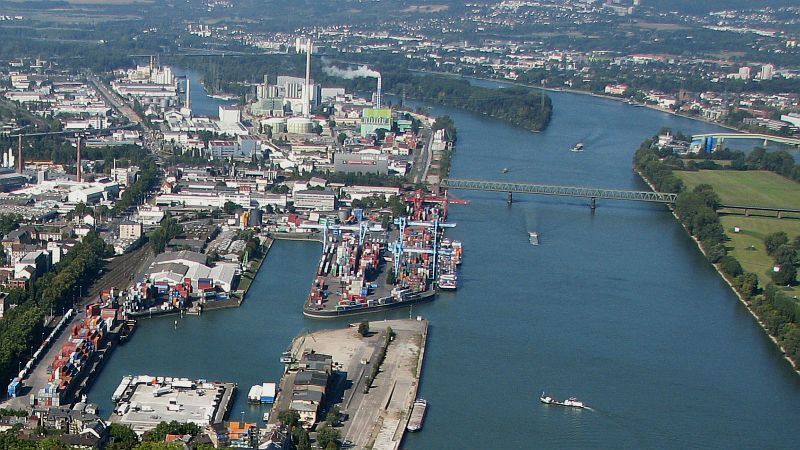
Blick auf die Ingelheimer Aue über den Zollhafen

Thee Ingelheimer Aue is a previous Rhine island, located on the left bank of the river by the city of Mainz, between 500 and 503,5 km from the river mouth. It forms the northernmost point of the city division Mainz-Neustadt and is used for commercial purposes.

== Development ==
=== Start of the 20th century ===
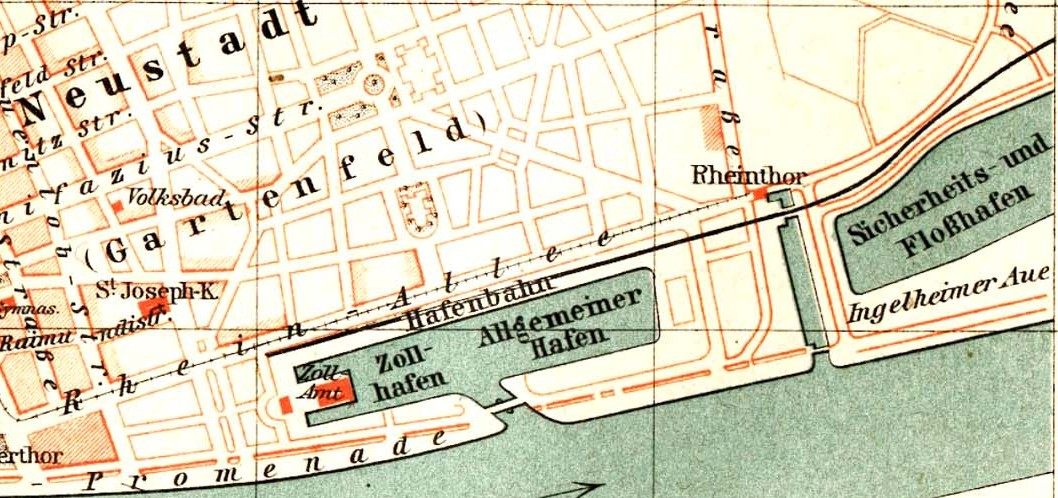
Port of Mainz

The Ingelheimer Aue was originally an island. The construction of the port of Mainz starting in 1880 included the construction of a dam that connected the island with the mainland, creating the river harbour north of the tax port (see illustration). This new harbour was inaugurated on 6 June 1887.

Starting at the end of the 19th century, an industrial area developed on the previous island. The first development was a gas and electric works, from 1899, as well as certain factories, for example the metal works of Wilhelm Hannss. In the subsequent years, a number of larger factories were built, for example Blendax (1931), Werner & Mertz (1908), and Römheld & Moelle (1906). Between 1906 and 1997 the Aue was connected to the Mainz tram network (Terminus: Ingelheimer Aue).

The piers of the Kaiserbrücke bridge, which is part of the railway ring around Mainz, the Mainz bypass, stand on the embankment. The bridge was inaugurated in 1904 by Kaiser Wilhelm II and the Hessian Grand Duke Ernst Ludwig in the presence of Reich Chancellor Bernhard von Bülow.

=== During National Socialism ===
In 1944, a camp for forced laborers was set up on the site of the Dr. Ing. Eugen Pfleiderer concrete slab plant. Up to 292 people were interned there; the camp was evacuated in March 1945.

In addition, there was a residential ship which anchored in the raft harbour and served as accommodation for female "Ostarbeiter" (forced labourers from Eastern Europe) of the Erdal company and other smaller companies in the industrial area.

=== Post-war years ===
Between 1956 and 1974, the largest gas container in Europe was located on the island. The "Gasometer" was 123 m high, occupied an area of 3550 m^{2} and had a capacity of 350,000 m^{3}.

=== Current ===
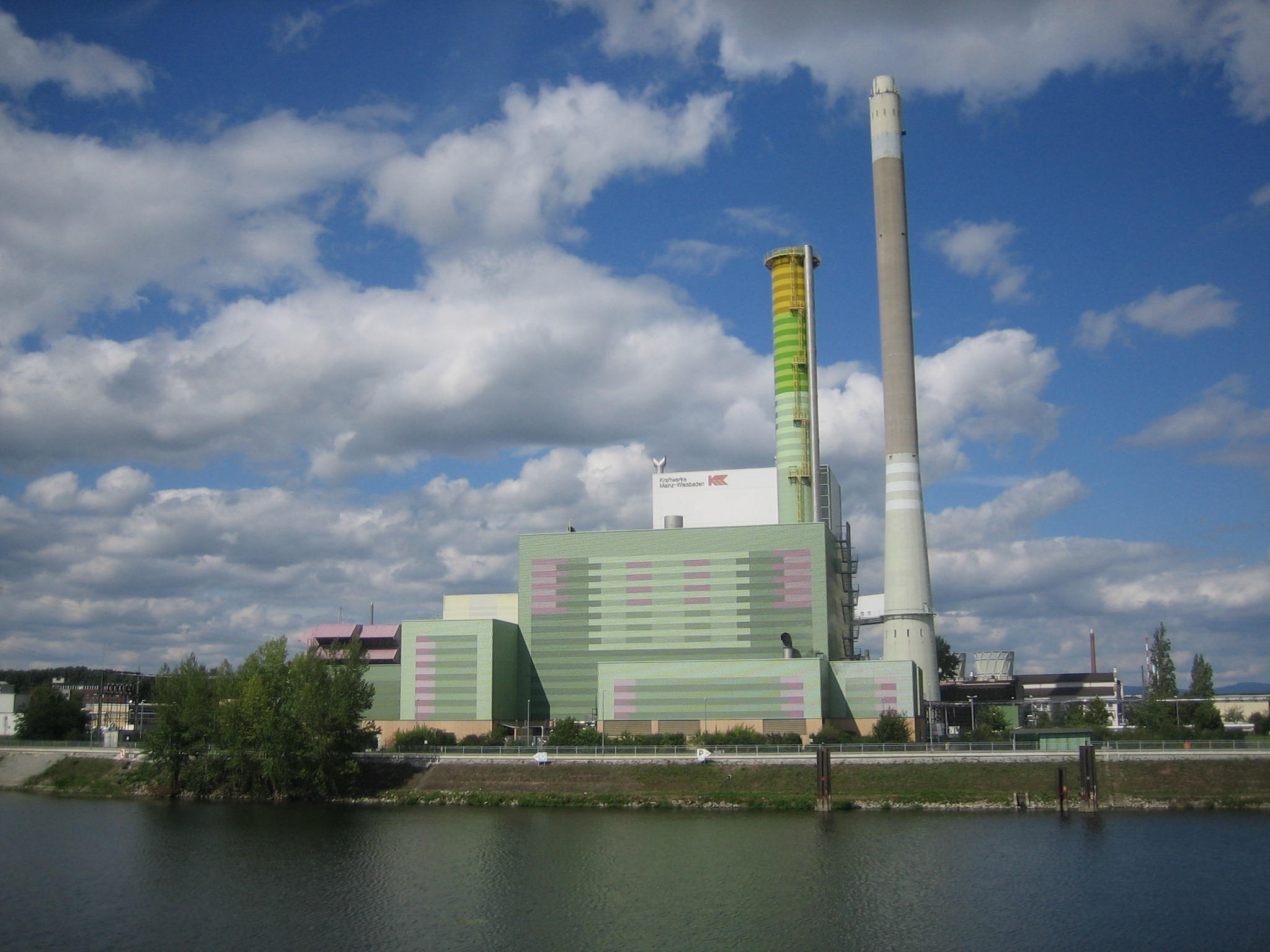
Mainz-Wiesbaden power plants

In recent years there have been several major construction projects on the Ingelheimer Aue, which have led to considerable changes in the infrastructure. Due to the conversion of the neighbouring customs port into a residential area, the container port there had to be relocated to the Ingelheimer Aue. For this purpose an area of approx. 30 ha was converted into a modern container port, which started operations in 2011.

Due to the location of the container port, it became necessary to close off Gaßnerallee, which until then had been the access road to the northern part of the peninsula. For this reason, a three-lane port bridge 170 metres long was built across the basin of the industrial port. It was inaugurated on 24 April 2009.

Stadtwerke Mainz and its subsidiary Kraftwerke Mainz-Wiesbaden AG (KMW) operate a gas power plant and a waste incineration plant on a large site on the Ingelheimer Aue. A coal-fired power plant with three 100 MW units, dating from 1958, 1963 and 1966, was shut down in 2000.

The current plant consists of two gas and steam combined cycle power plants, an older non-active unit from 1977 with a capacity of around 350 MW, and a newer power plant (2001) with a capacity of about 400 MW. At the end of 2018 a further block was completed with a total capacity of 100 MW for district heating, supplementing and expanding the existing district heating production of over 200 MW.

The waste incineration plant coupled to the gas-fired power plant was inaugurated on 12 November 2003. More than 350,000 tons of waste were incinerated there in 2014.

Plans for a coal-fired power plant with an electrical output of 800 MW and up to 300 MW of district heating were abandoned due to massive protests in 2012.

The paper mill WEPA Mainz GmbH, which produces toilet paper, is adjacent to the power plants. It employs 200 people on Ingelheimer Aue.

The Polycasa factory on the Aue manufactures extruded plastic sheets, and employs 125 people. In the history of the Mainz site, many materials have been used, from shellac, phenolic resins and phenolic moulding compounds to acrylic moulding compounds.

In addition, some water sports clubs have their buildings on the Ingelheimer Aue, e.g. the water sports department of the Mainz Police Sports Club.
