= Red Bull Simply Cola =

Cola sold by Red Bull GmbH

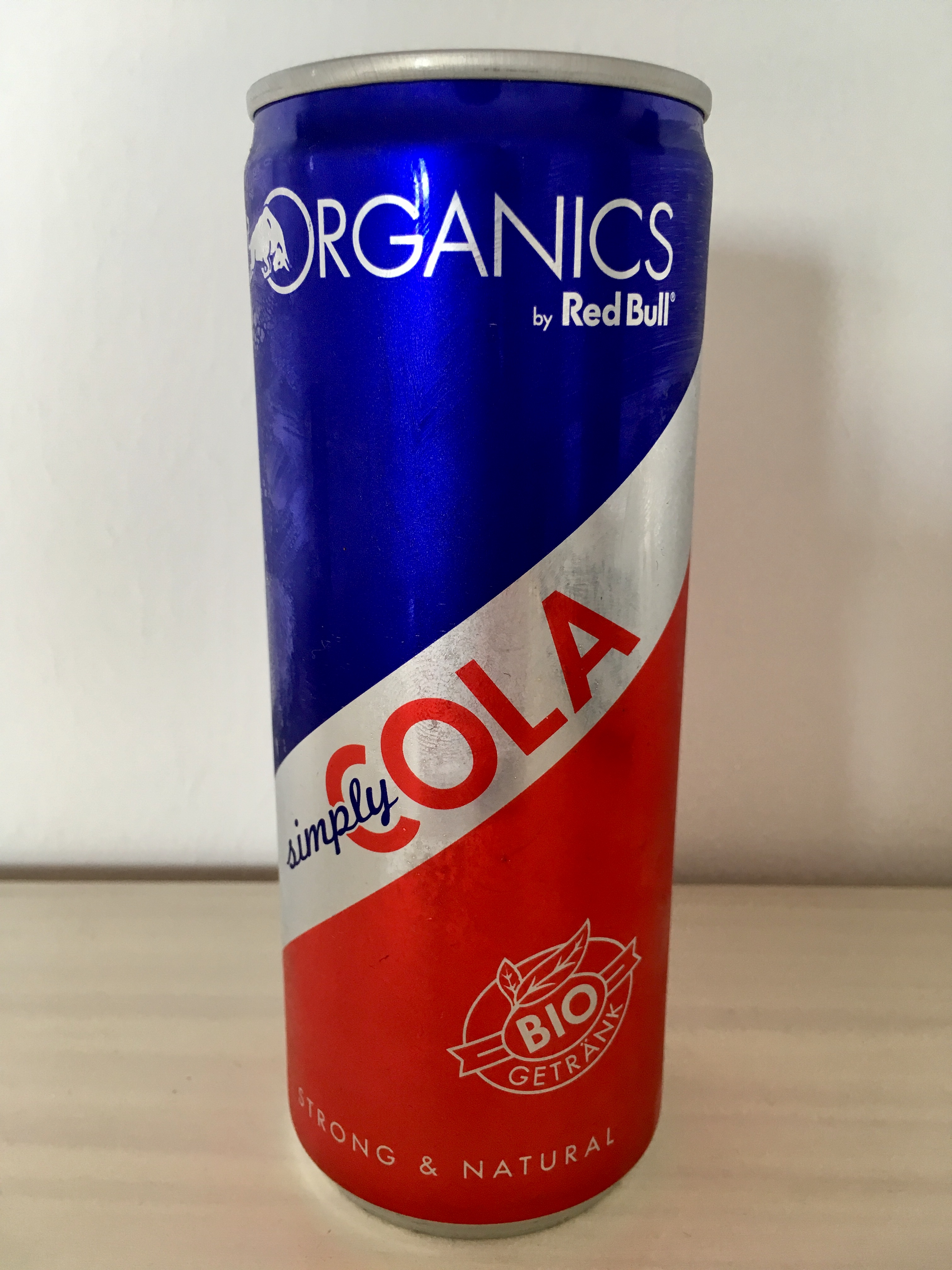
- 250 ml can as sold in Germany (old design)
- Type: Cola
- Manufacturer: Red Bull GmbH
- Origin: Austria
- Introduced: 2008; 18 years ago
- Website: www.redbull.com/int-en/theorganics/organics-simply-cola

Red Bull Simply Cola (branded as ORGANICS Simply Cola in its organic line) is a cola soft drink produced by Red Bull GmbH. It is made from ingredients of 100% natural origin, including cane sugar, plant extracts (such as kola nut, coca leaf, cinnamon, and vanilla), lemon juice concentrate, and caffeine derived from coffee beans. The drink is carbonated. According to Red Bull, its flavour is a balanced mixture of citrus, spice, and herbal notes.

== Ingredients and caffeine profile ==
Red Bull Simply Cola contains caffeine from coffee beans; At 45 milligrams per 355ml (12-ounce) can, the caffeine level is regulated by the FDA. It contains more than Coca-Cola (34 mg) or Pepsi-Cola (37.5 mg), but less than Diet Coke (47 mg) or Mountain Dew (54 mg). The cola contains significantly less caffeine than Red Bull's eponymous energy drink (80 mg per 250 ml). It contains sugar and caramel colour and lacks the phosphoric acid and high-fructose corn syrup used in some other colas.

== Availability and promotions ==
In 2008, the year of its release, Red Bull Simply Cola was available in Austria, Azerbaijan, the Czech Republic, Croatia, Egypt, Switzerland, the Netherlands, Spain, Poland, Germany, Bulgaria, Belgium, Ireland, Italy, India, Thailand, Romania, Hungary, Russia, Slovakia, New Zealand, Mexico, the United Kingdom and the United States.

Red Bull Simply Cola is packaged in 250 and 355 ml (8.8 and 12.5 imp fl oz) cans. The larger cans are sold both individually and in 4-packs.

Red Bull Simply Cola was promoted by Red Bull GmbH's two Formula 1 teams, Red Bull Racing and Scuderia Toro Rosso, and was featured on the sides of their car's rear wings from 2008 to 2011. Simply Cola sponsorship returned to Toro Rosso in 2016 and remained with the team until they reformed as AlphaTauri in 2020. Simply Cola returned to Red Bull Racing in 2018, though the logo was then displayed on the inside of the rear wing's side, where it remained up to the RB21.

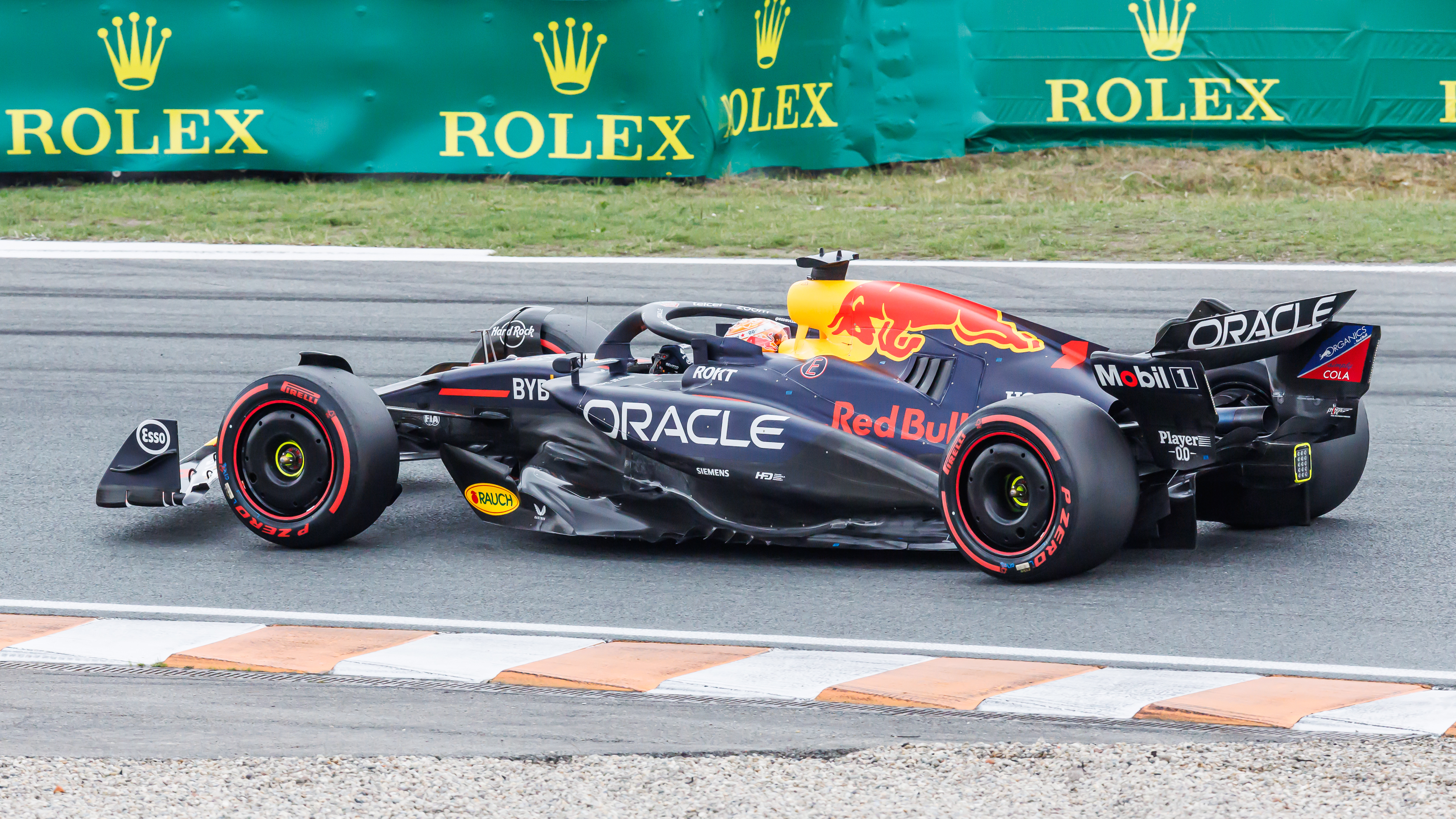
Red Bull Simply Cola sponsorship on Red Bull Racing's RB20 F1 car in 2024

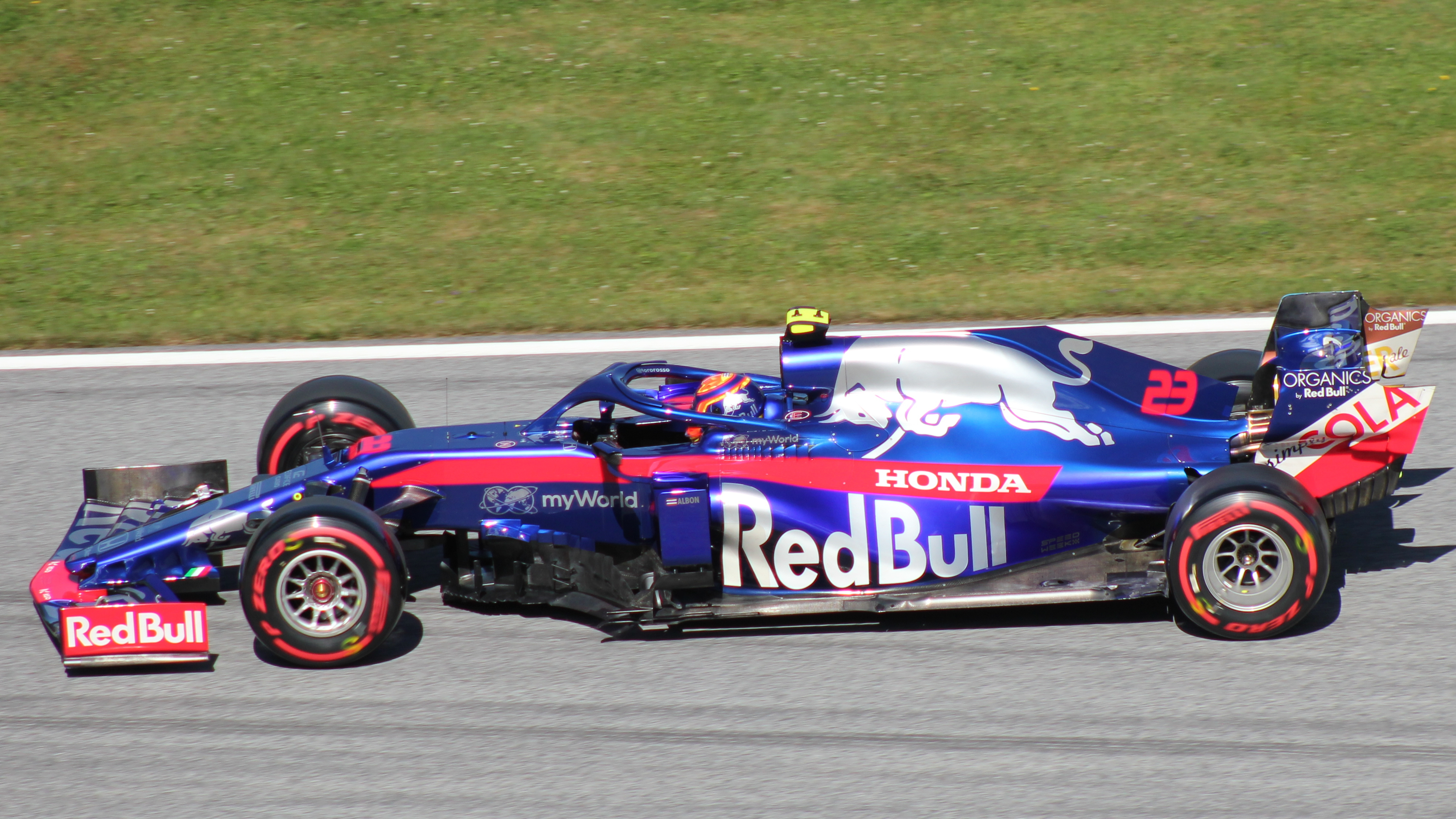
Red Bull Simply Cola sponsorship on Scuderia Toro Rosso's STR14 F1 car in 2019

Red Bull discontinued distribution of Red Bull Simply Cola in the US in late July 2011 to focus on its core markets, Austria and Germany.

In 2019, Red Bull released its Organics line, which includes a new version of Red Bull Simply Cola.

In June 2021, Red Bull Simply Cola made its debut in Turkey.

== Cocaine claim ==
In May 2009, food regulators from Germany discovered trace amounts of cocaine derived from coca leaf extracts in Red Bull Simply Cola, Pepsi One, and Diet Coke. Red Bull GmbH responded by insisting that only coca leaf extracts with cocaine removed are used in the production of Red Bull Cola. The amounts in question were considered minimal with around 0.13 micrograms of cocaine in a can of Red Bull Cola. Bernhard Hoffman, a food scientist for North Rhine-Westphalia who conducted the Red Bull study, posited that about 100,000 litres of the cola would need to be consumed for the cocaine to be harmful. Despite this, the drink was ordered off the shelves in the German states of Hesse, North Rhine-Westphalia, Thuringia and Rhineland-Palatinate. After the German Institute for Risk Assessment declared the product safe in a study, the drink was put back on sale 24 August 2009.

After the news of the German ban, Taiwan confiscated 18,000 cans of Red Bull products; however, the country later acknowledged the mistake.

== See also ==
- List of soft drinks by country
