= Mark Mateschitz =

Austrian heir (born 1992)

- Born: Mark Dietrich Mateschitz; 7 May 1992 (age 34); Salzburg, Austria
- Education: Salzburg University of Applied Sciences
- Occupation: Businessman
- Known for: 49% stake in Red Bull GmbH
- Board member of: Red Bull Wings for Life Foundation
- Parents: Dietrich Mateschitz (father); Anita Gerhardter (mother)

Mark Dietrich Mateschitz (German: [ˈmatεˌʃɪt͡s]; born 7 May 1992) is an Austrian billionaire businessman, who owns 49% of Red Bull GmbH, the energy drink company co-founded by his father, Dietrich Mateschitz.

In 2026, Forbes estimated Mateschitz' net worth at $45.8 billion, the 43rd-richest person in the world. In 2025, Mateschitz acquired a collection of grand prix and Formula One racing cars established by Bernie Ecclestone for £500 million.

== Early life and education ==
Mateschitz was born in May 1992, the only child of Dietrich Mateschitz and Anita Gerhardter. He went to high school in Salzburg, Austria and then studied business administration at Salzburg University of Applied Sciences. During his early life, he kept a low profile and went by his mother's surname; only his middle name, Dietrich, suggested a link to his father.

== Professional life ==
In 2018, Mateschitz launched his own drinks company, Thalheimer Heilwasser GmbH, which produces beer and lemonade with water from one of Austria's oldest springs. When his father died in October 2022, he inherited his father's 49% stake in Red Bull GmbH. He subsequently stepped down as an employee of the company in order to concentrate on his role as a shareholder. He sits on the board of the Red Bull Wings for Life Foundation, which is run chiefly by his mother Anita Gerhardter.
