= Reignwood Group =

Chinese investment company

- Native name: 华彬集团
- Founded: 1984
- Founder: Chanchai Ruayrungruang

Reignwood Group (Chinese: 华彬集团) is a Chinese investment company owning brands and companies in China, the rest of Asia, the UK and the US. It was founded in 1984 by Chanchai Ruayrungruang (a.k.a. Yan Bin), a Thai-Chinese businessman. Reignwood's businesses include consumer products, hotels and residential property, golf courses, wellness centres, travel agencies, aviation, offshore engineering and financing.

Ruayrungruang got the China licence of Red Bull from the TCP Group, but in 2014 this licence was given to Red Bull GmbH after TCP Group found that Reignwood was claiming 1-1.5bn cans but suspected that the real number was more than 3bn. Additionally the TCP Group also started selling Red Bull in China. A lawsuit from Reignwood was rejected in the courts.

In July 2014, Reignwood purchased a 25% stake in All Market, producer of Vita Coco, and in 2016 acquired a majority control of Voss.

Purchases in the UK include Ten Trinity Square - a mixed-use scheme including the Four Seasons Hotel London, Residences and Ten Trinity Square Private Club and Wentworth Club.

Birthplace of the Ryder Cup, home of the European Tour and host of the BMW PGA Championship, Reignwood purchased Wentworth Club in 2014 and has since committed over £20 million worth of investment to upgrade all the facilities including the courses and the clubhouse.

Reignwood purchased Ten Trinity Square in 2010 and spent 7 years restoring the Grade-II* listed heritage building. Originally designed by renowned architect Sir Edwin Cooper, it was built in 1922 as the headquarters of the Port of London Authority. On 19 July 2019, the development was announced as the winner of the annual City Heritage Award. Nominated by the City Heritage Society and the Worshipful Company of Painter-Stainers, the award is given to the best conservation or refurbishment project in the City of London. It was awarded AA Hotel of the Year London 2018-19, and a second Michelin star for LA Dame de Pic London, one of the three dining options within the hotel.

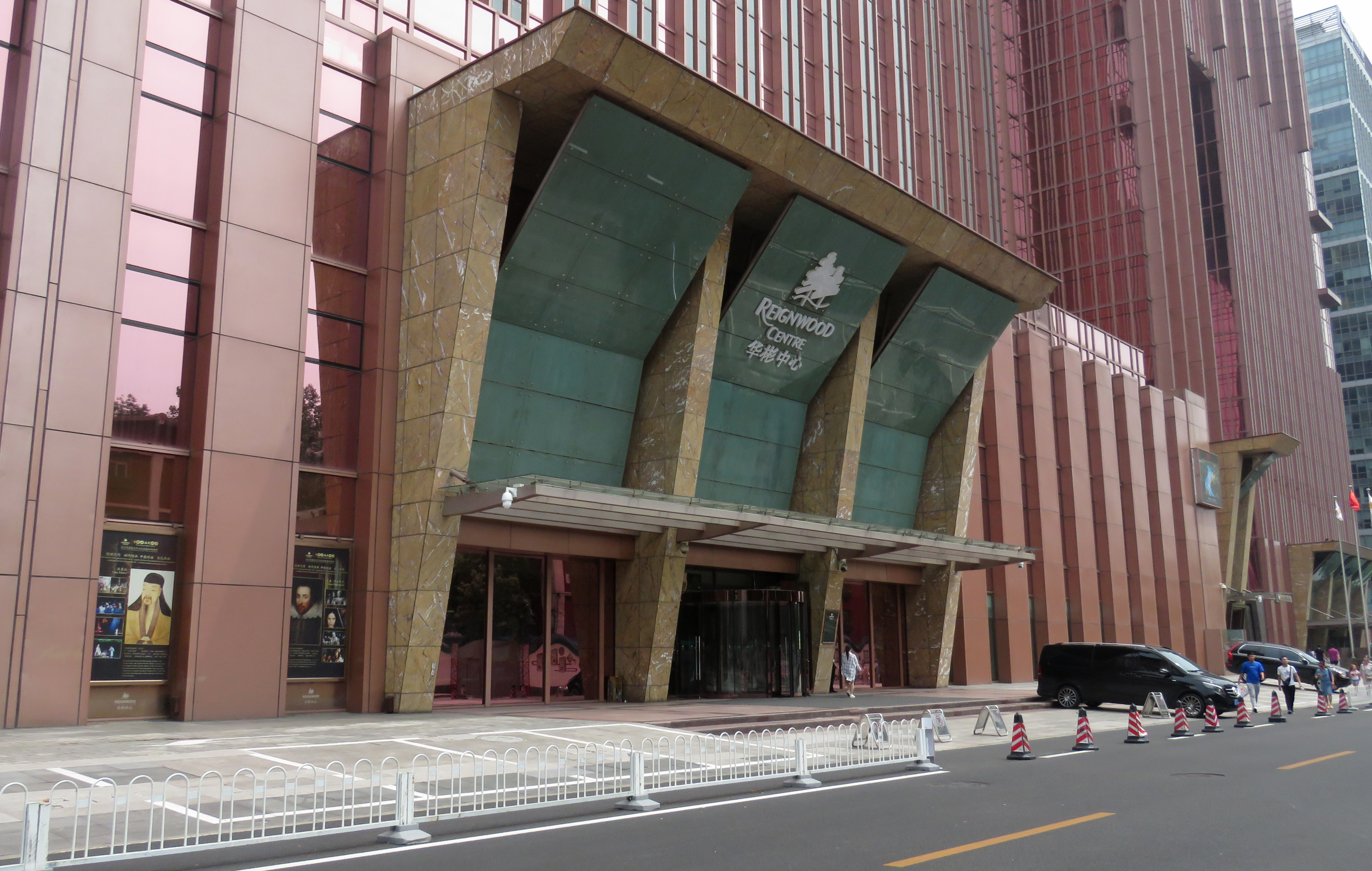
Reignwood Centre in Jianwai Subdistrict, Chaoyang District, Beijing

The Reignwood Culture Foundation was created to promote cultural exchange between the UK and China. It was the principal sponsor for the London Symphony Orchestra for three years.
