= Death of Wichian Klanprasert =

2012 crime in Thailand

Wichian Klanprasert (Thai: วิเชียร กลั่นประเสริฐ), a Thai police officer, was killed by Vorayuth Yoovidhya (Thai: วรยุทธ อยู่วิทยา), grandson of billionaire Red Bull co-founder Chaleo Yoovidhya, in a hit-and-run incident in Bangkok, Thailand, on 3 September 2012.

Vorayuth, then 27, was charged with speeding, fleeing the scene of an accident, and reckless driving causing death, but has never been arrested. Vorayuth fled by private jet in 2017, shortly before prosecutors secured an arrest warrant. His trail ended in Singapore after luxury travel across Europe, Asia and the Middle East. No later sighting has been independently confirmed.

The statute of limitations on the speeding charge expired in September 2013, and on the fleeing the scene of an accident charge in September 2017. His last charge, reckless driving causing death, expires on September 3, 2027 - potentially clearing his return after years beyond police reach. Thailand has now entered its final one-year hunt for fugitive Red Bull heir Vorayuth “Boss” Yoovidhya over a Wichian Klanprasert's death. Vorayuth Yoovidhya remains wanted under a Thai arrest warrant. Police Lieutenant General Trairong Phiwphan (current Deputy Inspector General and Royal Thai Police spokesperson) also confirmed that an Interpol Red Notice for Vorayuth remains valid and active within Interpol's restricted police system.

The case is widely seen as an example of how the affluent in Thai society are able to escape the criminal justice system.

== 2012 hit-and-run ==
Wichian, a Thai police senior sergeant-major, was riding a motorcycle when he was hit by a speeding Ferrari, which dragged his body along the road for over 100 m (330 ft) before it fled the scene. Based on analysis of CCTV footage, two independent teams of specialists, including a physics lecturer at Chulalongkorn University estimated that the Ferrari was travelling at a speed of 177 or 174 km/h (110 or 108 mph) at the time.

The Ferrari was later found to have been driven by Vorayuth, a grandson of billionaire Red Bull co-founder Chaleo Yoovidhya. Vorayuth was found to have illegal drugs (cocaine) and alcohol in his system. Vorayuth's lawyer later claimed that Vorayuth's high blood alcohol levels were due to his drinking at home, due to stress following the accident and that he had left the scene to inform his family of what had happened. Although the police reportedly have no official record of this, Vorayuth asserted that the cocaine was found in his system due to medicine administered during dental work. Vorayuth initially claimed that Suwet Hom-ubol, Vorayuth's aide and chauffeur, had been behind the wheel during the incident, but later admitted to driving the car himself. Suwet would later be charged with making false statements to the police. An investigating police officer, Police Lieutenant Colonel Pannaphol Nammueng, allegedly urged Suwet to pretend to be the Ferrari driver in the fatal hit-and-run. The case has caused continuing outrage in Thailand.

== Subsequent investigation ==
Despite assurances by then-Police Commissioner Comronwit Toopgrajank that the case would be taken seriously, as of April 2017 Vorayuth had yet to be indicted, as his lawyers had repeatedly postponed summons by the Attorney-General, claiming illness, overseas business and unfair treatment, and the statute of limitations expired for several charges.

In April 2017, Vorayuth failed for the eighth time to appear in court to answer the charges against him, citing work commitments.

On 28 April 2017 the criminal court approved an arrest warrant for Vorayuth, however he had already fled to Singapore, where he abandoned his private jet. Interpol confirmed that Vorayuth left Singapore on 27 April. Thai police requested that his Thai passport be cancelled and this was done in early May 2017.

On 28 August 2017 Interpol, at the request of the Thai police, issued a red notice for the arrest of Vorayuth.

== Dismissal of charges ==
On 24 July 2020, Thai police confirmed that all charges against Vorayuth had been dropped on instructions from the Thai Attorney General, but indicated that case could be reopened if new evidence was discovered. The Attorney General did not elaborate or provide any explanation for dropping the case. Deputy police spokesman Kissana Phathanacharoen denied that the Yoovidhya family's wealth had played any part in the decision to drop the charges. News of this development led to significant public outcry and criticism from Thai academics, and a movement to boycott Red Bull products, including trending Twitter hashtags like #BossYoovidhya.

A leaked copy of the prosecutor's report revealed that a new review conducted in 2017 concluded that the Ferrari's speed was only 76.17 km/h (47.33 mph), under the road's 80 km/h (50 mph) speed limit, and two eyewitnesses testified that Wichian had been driving erratically. The report stated that, since Vorayuth's actions were not negligent and Wichian's driving had been a contributory factor in his own death, there was no basis for a Section 291 criminal charge for negligence leading to death.

On 27 July 2020, Thai police announced that Police General Jakthip Chaijinda had launched an internal investigation into irregularities with this case. Wichian's surviving brother expressed his dismay at the outcome, indicating frustration with the sense of impunity in Thailand's criminal justice system for wealthy and well-connected Thais.

On 29 August 2024, Somyot Poompanmoung, the former commander of the Royal Thai Police, was indicted along with former Deputy Attorney General Nate Naksuk and six others for conspiring to alter the recorded speed of Vorayuth's Ferrari at the time of the incident.

On 22 April 2025, the Associated Press reported former Deputy Attorney General Nate Naksuk was convicted and sentenced to three years in prison. Former prosecutor Chainarong Sangthongaram was convicted and sentenced to two years in prison. Both were convicted for abuse of power to help Vorayuth Yoovidhya avoid prosecution. The rest, including former Police Chief Gen. Somyot Poompanmoung, were acquitted due to a lack of evidence.

== See also ==
- Corruption in Thailand
