= Fuschl am See =

- Municipality
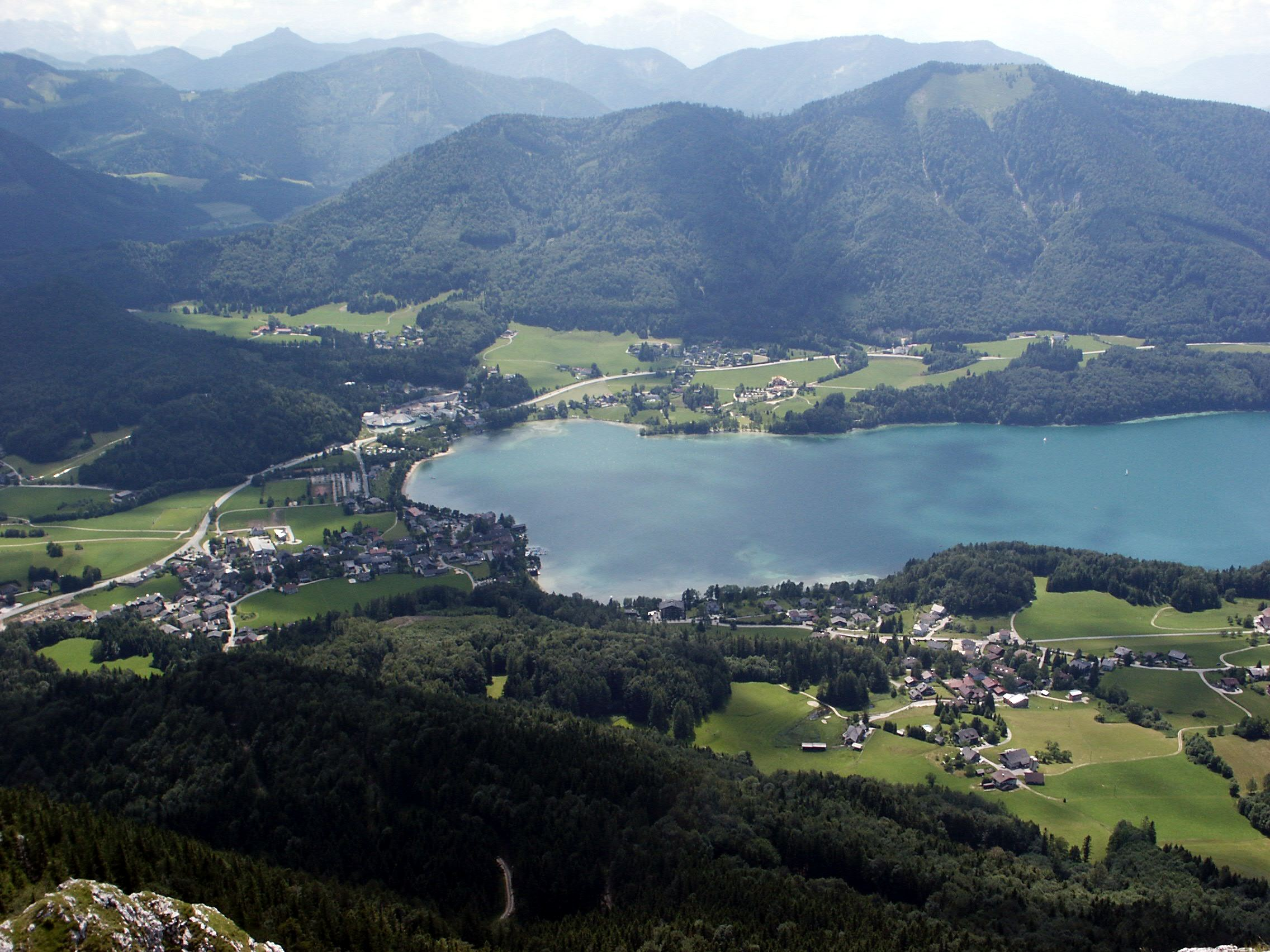
- Aerial view

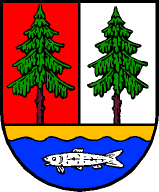
- Coat of arms

- Location within Austria
- Coordinates: 47°47′46″N 13°18′10″E
- Country: Austria
- State: Salzburg
- District: Salzburg-Umgebung

Government
  - Mayor: Franz Josef Vogl (ÖVP)

Area
  - Total: 21.4 km^{2} (8.3 sq mi)
- Elevation: 669 m (2,195 ft)

Population (2018-01-01)
  - Total: 1,520
  - Density: 71.0/km^{2} (184/sq mi)
- Time zone: UTC+1 (CET)
  - Summer (DST): UTC+2 (CEST)
- Postal code: 5330
- Area code: 06226
- Vehicle registration: SL
- Website: www.fuschl.salzburg.at

Fuschl am See is an Austrian municipality in the district of Salzburg-Umgebung, in the state of Salzburg. It is located at the east end of the Fuschlsee, between the city of Salzburg and Bad Ischl. As of 2018, the community has approximately 1,500 inhabitants.

== Geography ==
Fuschl am See covers an area of 21.4 km^{2}. The city lies in the mid-northern part of Austria near the German state of Bavaria.

== History ==
The Fuschl region is mentioned for the first time in the "Congestum Arnonis" (as a record of it forming part of the estates belonging to the diocese of Salzburg, from the time of Bishop Arno in 790). From the 8th century onwards the whole area of Thalgau-Fuschl am See-Abersee was owned by archbishops who were the lords of the area. For a long time Fuschl am See had no name but in the 12th century the area was known as “Fuschilsee”. Documented by archbishop Konrad I in the year 1141 chronicling the lake fishermen "ad Fuschilsee" which belongs to the monastery of St. Peters.

== Schloss Fuschl Castle Hotel ==
Following a major renovation the Rosewood Hotel Schloss Fuschl now hosts a spa of 1,500 square meters and a new infinity pool above lake Fuschl. Built in 1461, Schloss Fusch became a hotel in 1958. In the mid-1950s it was the filming location for the iconic Sissi Austrian film franchise.

== Economy ==
Red Bull GmbH has its headquarters in Fuschl.

== Transport ==
Highway B158 from Bad Ischl to Salzburg passes through Fuschl.

== Notable residents ==
- Former F1 driver Scott Speed
- Dietrich Mateschitz, Red Bull co-founder

== See also ==
- Salzburg
- Salzburgerland
