= Chaleo Yoovidhya =

Thai businessman (1923–2012)

- เฉลียว อยู่วิทยา
- Born: 17 August 1923; Phichit, Siam
- Died: 17 March 2012 (aged 88); Bangkok, Thailand
- Occupations: Businessman; investor
- Known for: Creating Krating Daeng; Co-founding Red Bull GmbH
- Spouse(s): Noklek Sodsri (divorced); Bhavana Langdhara
- Children: 11, including Chalerm

Chaleo Yoovidhya (Thai: เฉลียว อยู่วิทยา, RTGS: Chaliao Yuwitthaya, pronounced [t͡ɕʰā.lǐa̯w jùː.wít.tʰā.jāː]; Chinese: 許書標; pinyin: Xǔ Shūbiāo; 17 August 1923 – 17 March 2012) was a Thai businessman and entrepreneur. He was the originator of Krating Daeng and co-creator of the Red Bull brand of energy drinks. At the time of his death in 2012 at the age of 88, he was listed as the third-richest person in Thailand, with an estimated net worth of US$5 billion.

== Background ==
Various news sources suggest Chaleo was born in central Thailand at some point between 1922 and 1932. The New York Times notes that three birthdates have been put forward by different sources: The Nation, a Thai newspaper, reported that he was 90, while several other news media outlets in Thailand said he was 88. Forbes recently put his age at 80." BBC News states, "Mr Chaleo was born of poor Chinese immigrant parents in the northern province of Phichit, reportedly in 1932, local media say." The Australian and Time say he was 89. The Telegraph and The Independent say he was born in 1923 to a poor Thai Chinese family that raised ducks and traded fruit in Phichit. His father was a Chinese immigrant from Wenchang, Hainan.

With little formal education, he worked for his parents, then moved to Bangkok. He became an antibiotics salesman, before quitting to set up his own small pharmaceutical company, TC Pharmaceuticals, in the early-1960s. Later, after a claimed stroke of "divine inspiration", he developed an energy-boosting beverage that was first introduced in 1976. The logo depicts two large red bulls charging each other. The bulls are not cattle, but wild gaur, a bovine species native to Southeast Asia and called krathing (กระทิง) in Thai.

Dietrich Mateschitz, an Austrian salesman for a German company, found the drink cured his jet lag, and entered into partnership with Chaleo in 1984. In 1987, the two launched an export version labelled "Red Bull", for which Chaleo provided the original formula (adapted for Western tastes under Mateschitz's guidance), and Mateschitz the marketing. Each put up US$500,000 for 49 per cent of the Red Bull energy drink franchise, with Chaleo's son, Chalerm, owning the remaining two per cent. Chaleo continued to own TC Pharmaceuticals, which manufactured other energy drinks in Thailand, and was also part-owner of Piyavate Hospital, a private hospital in Thailand, and co-owner of the sole authorized importer of Ferrari sports cars into Thailand.

== Death ==
Chaleo died in Bangkok on 17 March 2012.

== See also ==
- Death of Wichian Klanprasert, a case in which Chaleo's grandson Vorayuth Yoovidhya was involved
