= Blendax =

1932–2002 German personal hygiene product manufacturer

- Industry: Hygiene products
- Founded: 1932; 94 years ago in Mainz
- Parent: Procter & Gamble

Blendax GmbH, founded in 1932 in Mainz, was a German manufacturer of personal hygiene products and toothpaste between 1936 and 2002. With an annual production of 43 million tubes of toothpaste, it was at one time Europe's largest toothpaste producer.

The company's best known brand, introduced in 1951, was called blend-a-med. Since 1987, the company has belonged to Procter & Gamble.

== Founding ==
The wordmark "Blendax" for toothpaste was registered in Germany on 4 January 1910, and the Blendax factory was founded in 1932 by the brothers Rudolf und Hermann Schneider in Mainz; production started in 1936. The goal was to produce a brand of toothpaste that would be affordable by everyone. By the end of the 1930s, Blendax had become Europe's largest producer of toothpaste with 43 million tubes per year. The product portfolio was expanded to include other personal hygiene products like shampoo, soap, skin cream and Mouthwash.

== Destruction and rebuilding ==
The main and original factory in Mainz on the Ingelheimer Aue (an island in the Rhine) was almost completely destroyed during World War II. The undamaged branch in Gera was appropriated after the war. At first it was known as VEB Blendax, later as VEB Gerana and after German reunification, as Gerana Cosmetic GmbH, before finally being closed in 2007 as a result of bankruptcy. The original buildings in Gera by the city moat are still extant.

The Mainz work was rebuilt in 1946, with toothpaste production resuming in 1949. In 1956, the production was expanded to include shampoo and bath foam. A special toothpaste for milk teeth was introduced in 1956 under the name Blendi, and in 1957 the production of toothbrushes was started. In the 1970s, the toothpaste Strahler 70 was introduced.

== Blend-a-med ==
In 1949 the Mainz pharmacist Hertha Hafer offered Blendax her original toothpaste recipe, and In 1951 they started production of blend-a-med, Germany's first medicated toothpaste, at first only available from pharmacies and dentists.

As a result of this new product, a research and development division was founded in the same year under the name blend-a-med Forschung, with the goal to develop products for the prevention of dental and oral diseases.

== Well-known products ==
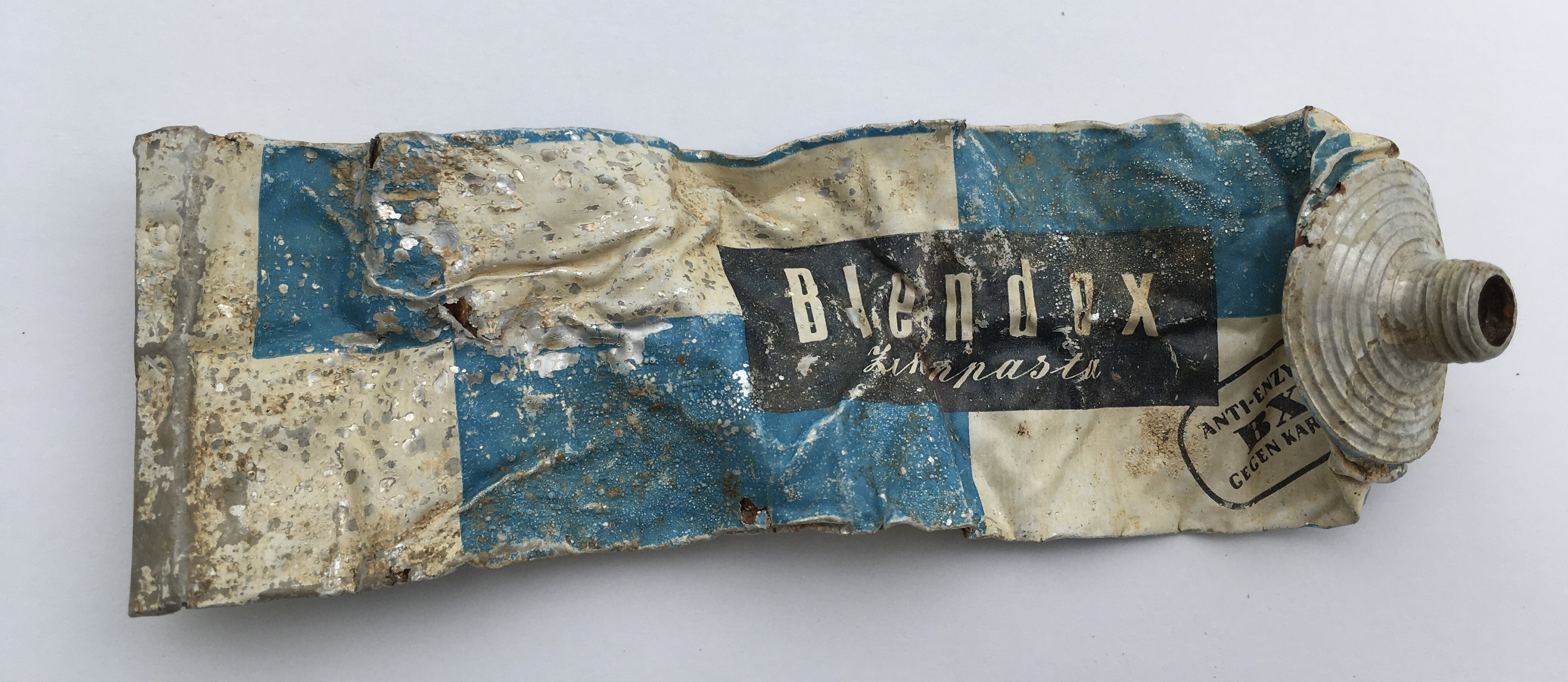
Blendax toothpaste with anti-enzyme BX against dental caries from the 1950/60s

Dental care

- blend-a-med
- blend-a-med Formel Z
- Blendax Antibelag
- Blendi
- Formel M
- Strahler 70, Strahler 75 and Strahler 80
- Blendax Fluor Super

Haircare

- Shamtu
- Tosan

Skincare

- Kamill
- Credo
- Cliff
- Do7

== Takeover ==
In 1987 the family business was taken over by the American company Procter & Gamble. At first the takeover led to a strengthening of the site, as P&G moved their British toothpaste production to Mainz in 1989, making the site their main European dental hygiene centre. In 1993, however, the production of skincare products in Mainz was stopped. The production of toothpaste and toothbrushes was continued until 2002, when it was moved to the previous Richardson Wicks site in nearby Groß-Gerau.
