= Red Bull =

Brand of energy drinks

Red Bull Energy Drink
- Type: Energy drink
- Manufacturer: Rauch Fruchtsäfte
- Distributor: Red Bull GmbH
- Origin: Fuschl am See, Salzburg, Austria
- Introduced: 1 April 1987; 39 years ago
- Colour: Yellow
- Ingredients: Caffeine, taurine, glucuronolactone, sucrose and glucose, B-group vitamins, and water
- Variants: Red Bull Sugarfree; Red Bull Total Zero; Red Bull Zero; Red Bull Energy Shot; Red Bull Editions
- Related products: Krating Daeng; Red Bull Simply Cola; Organics by Red Bull
- Website: www.redbull.com/int-en/energydrink/red-bull-energy-drink

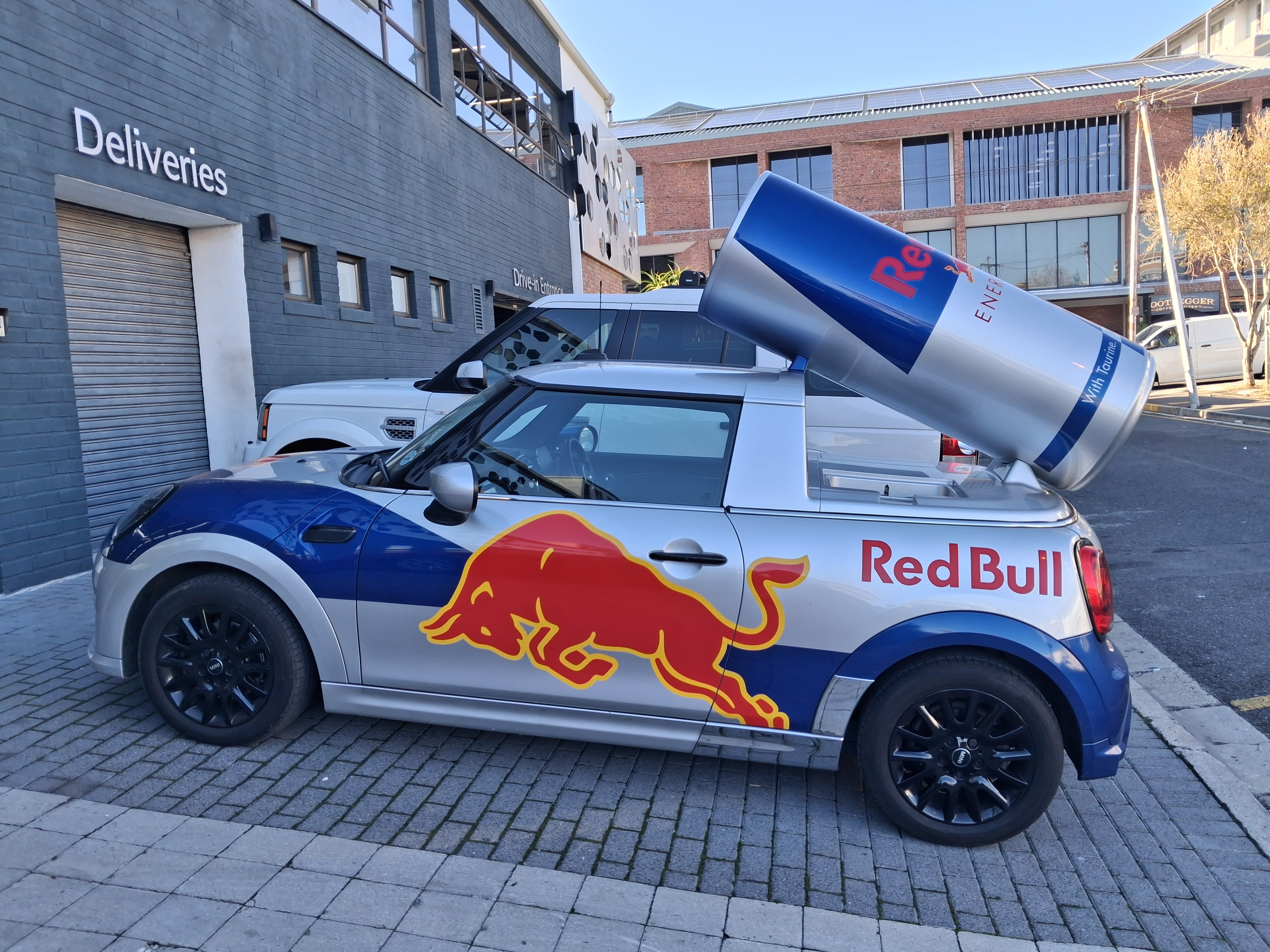
Red Bull Mini in Cape Town, South Africa

Red Bull is a brand of energy drinks created and owned by the Austrian company Red Bull GmbH. It had a global market share of 13% in the energy drink market in 2023 and was the third most valuable soft drink brand in 2021, behind Coca-Cola and Pepsi. Since its launch in 1987, more than 100 billion cans of Red Bull have been sold worldwide, including over 13.9 billion in 2025.

Originally available only in a single undistinguished flavour called Red Bull Energy Drink, the drink added numerous variants over time. Rather than following a traditional marketing approach, Red Bull has generated awareness and created a "brand myth" through extreme sport events.

Red Bull was derived from a similar drink called Krating Daeng which originated in Thailand and was introduced by Chaleo Yoovidhya. While doing business in Thailand, Austrian entrepreneur Dietrich Mateschitz purchased a can of Krating Daeng and claimed it cured his jet lag. Mateschitz sought to create a partnership with Chaleo and formulated a product that would suit the tastes of Westerners, such as by carbonating the drink. In 1984, the two founded Red Bull GmbH in Fuschl am See, Salzburg, Austria.

== History ==
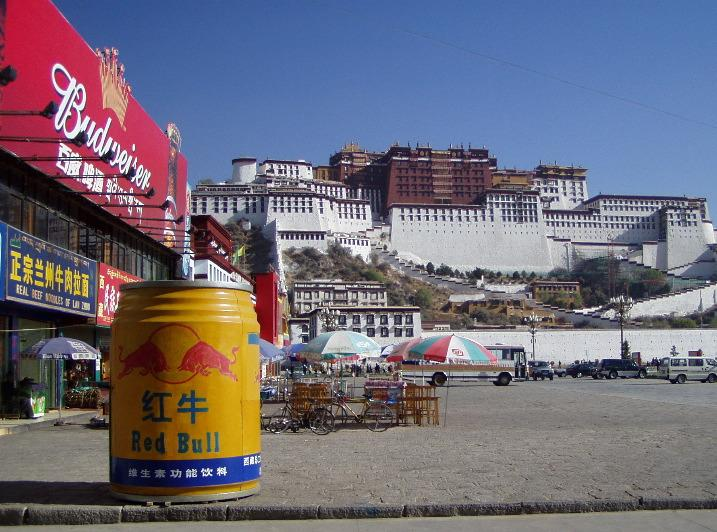
A large can of the Chinese version of Red Bull stands in front of the Potala Palace in Tibet.

In 1976, Thai entrepreneur Chaleo Yoovidhya introduced a drink called Krating Daeng in Thailand, which means "red gaur" in English. It was popular among Thai truck drivers and labourers. While working for German manufacturer Blendax (later acquired by Procter & Gamble) in 1982, Dietrich Mateschitz travelled to Thailand and met Chaleo, owner of T.C. Pharmaceutical. During his visit, Mateschitz discovered that Krating Daeng helped cure his jet lag. In 1984, Mateschitz co-founded Red Bull GmbH with Chaleo and turned it into an international brand. Each partner invested US$500,000 of savings to fund the company. Chaleo and Mateschitz each held a 49 percent share of the new company. They gave the remaining two percent to Chaleo's son, Chalerm, but it was agreed that Mateschitz would run the company. The product was first launched in Austria on 1 April 1987.

In Thailand, energy drinks are most popular with blue-collar workers. Red Bull re-positioned the drink as a trendy, upscale drink, first introducing it at Austrian ski resorts. Pricing was a key differentiator, with Red Bull positioned as a premium drink and Krating Daeng as a lower cost item. In many countries, both drinks are available, dominating each end of the price spectrum. The flavouring used for Red Bull is still produced in Bangkok and exported worldwide.

During the 1990s, the product expanded into Hungary, Slovenia, Germany, the Czech Republic, Croatia, the United Kingdom, Australia, and the United States. It entered Germany and the UK in 1994, the United States (via California) in 1996, the Middle East in 2000 and the Philippines in 2012. In 2008, Forbes magazine listed both Chaleo and Mateschitz as the 250th richest people in the world with an estimated net worth of US$4 billion.

Red Bull GmbH is headquartered in Fuschl am See, an Austrian village of about 1,500 inhabitants near Salzburg. The company is 51 percent controlled by the Yoovidhya family who, for "technical reasons", own the trademark in Europe and the US. Claims about the drink's effects and performance have been challenged on various occasions, with the UK's Advertising Standards Authority imposing advertising restrictions in 2001 in response to complaints recorded as early as 1997.

== Ingredients ==
Nutritional value per 250 ml (8.4 fl oz)
- Energy: 460 kJ (110 kcal)
- Carbohydrates: 29
- Sugars: 27
- Dietary fibre: 0
- Fat: 0
- Saturated: 0
- Protein: 0
Vitamins and minerals
Minerals	Quantity %DV^{†}
Sodium	5% 105 mg
- ^{†}Percentages estimated using US recommendations for adults.

Depending on the country, Red Bull contains different amounts of caffeine, taurine, B vitamins (B2, B3, B5, B6, and B12), glucuronolactone and simple sugars (sucrose and glucose) in a buffer solution of carbonated water, sodium bicarbonate and magnesium carbonate (substituted in some flavours with a trisodium citrate/citric acid buffer, each solution providing electrolytes). To produce Red Bull Sugarfree, sucrose and glucose have been replaced by artificial sweeteners acesulfame K and aspartame or sucralose.

=== Caffeine content ===
The caffeine content of a single 250 ml can of Red Bull is approximately 40–80 mg / 250 ml (15–32 mg / 100 ml). The caffeine level in Red Bull varies depending on the country, as some countries have legal restrictions on how much caffeine is allowed in drinks. As is the case with other caffeinated beverages, Red Bull drinkers may experience adverse effects as a result of overuse. Excessive consumption may induce mild to moderate euphoria primarily caused by stimulant properties of caffeine and may also induce agitation, anxiety, irritability, and insomnia.

== Variants ==
Over the years, Red Bull has offered many variations of its drink, all based on the same formula, but differing in taste and colour. Red Bull began offering variations of its drinks in 2003. A sugar-free version of the drink was introduced with a different flavour from the original, called Red Bull Sugarfree. In 2012, Red Bull released Red Bull Total Zero, a variant with zero calories. In 2018, the company released Red Bull Zero, a different sugar-free formulation designed to taste more like the original flavour.

In 2009, Red Bull unveiled a highly concentrated variant of its drink called Red Bull Energy Shot, supplied in 2 oz (60 ml) cans. The company began expanding its flavour offerings in 2013 with the launch of Red Bull Editions. Initially available in cranberry, blueberry, and lime, the Editions line has expanded to include a variety of flavours. Some of these flavours are only available during specific seasons or in certain regions. Currently, sea blue (juneberry), peach (white peach), apple (fuji apple-ginger), iced (iced vanilla berry), pink (wild berries), yellow (tropical), coconut (coconut-berry), amber (strawberry-apricot) and red (watermelon) flavors are offered.

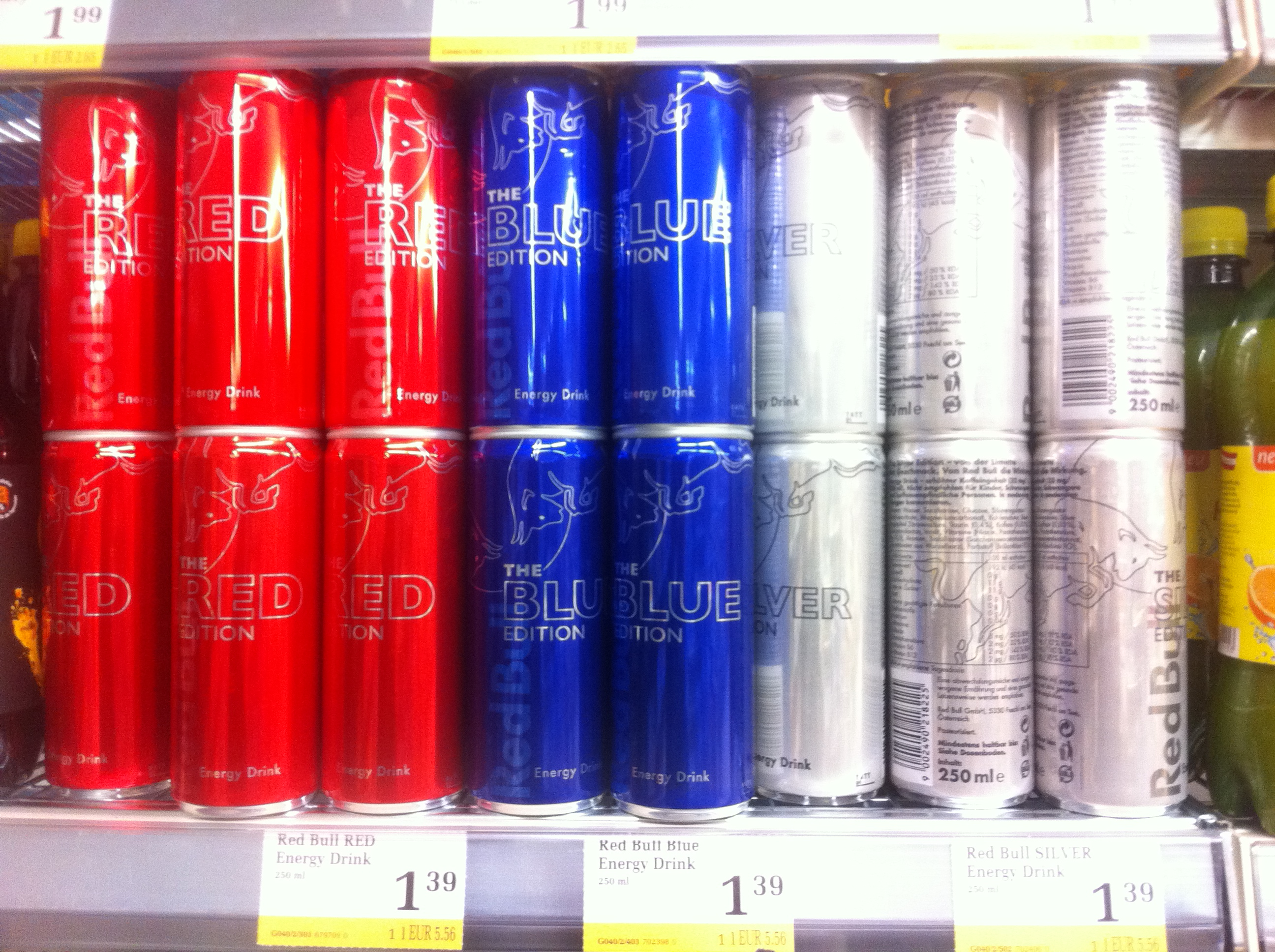
The original three flavoured Editions: red (cranberry), blue (blueberry) and silver (dry lime). Silver and blue have since been discontinued, and red reformulated to a watermelon flavour.

=== Other products ===
Red Bull released a cola drink, called Simply Cola, in 2008. A new version of the cola was released in 2019, as part of Red Bull's Organics line. In 2018, the company launched Organics by Red Bull, a line of organic sodas with four flavours; bitter lemon, ginger ale, tonic water, and a new version of Red Bull Simply Cola.

== Legal affairs ==
=== Regulatory approval ===
Authorities in France, Denmark, and Norway initially did not permit the sale of Red Bull. As of 2021, it is on sale in all 27 member states of the European Union and 171 countries worldwide. The French food safety agency was concerned about taurine; a Red Bull drink that did not contain taurine was introduced. The French refusal of market approval was challenged by the European Commission, and partially upheld by the European Court of Justice in 2004. The French food safety agency relented in 2008 because it was unable to prove a definite health risk.

=== Litigation ===
In 2013, Red Bull told the Redwell Brewery, a Norfolk-based micro brewery, to change its name or face legal action, because it sounded too similar to Red Bull. The eight-man brewery in Norwich was told its name could "confuse" customers and "tarnish" its trademark. The two companies reached a settlement permitting Redwell to continue using its name.

In 2014, Red Bull entered into a US$13 million settlement to resolve two consumer class action lawsuits in the United States District Court for the Southern District of New York. Named as plaintiffs were Benjamin Careathers, David Wolf, and Miguel Almarez, who had sued the company claiming breach of express warranty and unjust enrichment, saying that Red Bull falsely asserted performance-enhancing benefits from the drink's ingredients which were unsubstantiated by scientific studies. On 1 May 2015, the Court approved the settlement, giving customers who had submitted claims the opportunity to receive a US$10 cash reimbursement, or US$15 in Red Bull products, within 150 days of affirmance on any appeal.
